= List of shipwrecks in 1944 =

The list of shipwrecks in 1944 includes ships sunk, foundered, grounded, or otherwise lost during 1944.

table of contents
1944
| Jan | Feb | Mar | Apr |
| May | Jun | Jul | Aug |
| Sep | Oct | Nov | Dec |
Unknown date

== Unknown date ==
List of shipwrecks: Unknown date 1944
| Ship | State | Description |
|---|---|---|
| AF 57 | Kriegsmarine | The Type A Artilleriefährprahm was sunk sometime in 1944. |
| Alice L. Pendleton | United States | The 228-foot (69 m), 1,349-gross register ton four-masted lumber schooner was abandoned at the Palmer Shipyard on the west side of the Mystic River in Noank, Connecticut, sometime during the 1940s, gradually rotted away, and settled on the river bottom in 10 feet (3.0 m) of water. |
| V 607 Düsseldorf | Kriegsmarine | The vorpostenboot was sunk in French waters. Salvaged post-war, repaired and entered French service as the fishing vessel Turbot. |
| F 241 | Kriegsmarine | The Type A Marinefahrprahm was sunk sometime in the Winter of 1944/1945. |
| F 459 | Kriegsmarine | The Type C Marinefahrprahm was sunk sometime in 1944. |
| F 615 | Kriegsmarine | The Type C2 Marinefahrprahm was sunk sometime in 1944. |
| F 626 | Kriegsmarine | The Type C2 Marinefahrprahm was sunk sometime in 1944. |
| F 855 | Kriegsmarine | The Type D Marinefahrprahm was sunk sometime in 1944. |
| F 923 | Kriegsmarine | The Type DM minelayer Marinefahrprahm was sunk sometime in 1944 or 1945. |
| F 949 | Kriegsmarine | The Type DM minelayer Marinefahrprahm was sunk sometime in 1944 or 1945. |
| F 964 | Kriegsmarine | The Type D Marinefahrprahm was sunk sometime in 1944 or 1945. |
| F 1165 | Kriegsmarine | The Type D Marinefahrprahm was sunk sometime in 1944 or 1945. |
| G 310 Triglav | Kriegsmarine | The coaster was wrecked near Trieste. Raised, either by the Germans, repaired and returned to service, or by her Yugoslav owners post war. |
| Gyoraitei No. 114 | Imperial Japanese Navy | The Q/No. 114-class motor torpedo boat was lost in 1944 or 1945. |
| Gyoraitei No. 116, and Gyoraitei No. 117 | Imperial Japanese Navy | The TM 4/No. 102-class motor torpedo boats were lost in 1944 at or near Rabaul. |
| Gyoraitei No. 233 | Imperial Japanese Navy | The Gyoraitei No. 31-class motor torpedo boat was lost in 1944 or 1945. |
| Gyoraitei No. 428 | Imperial Japanese Navy | The Gyoraitei No. 36-class motor torpedo boat was lost in 1944. |
| H-1 | Imperial Japanese Navy | The H-1-class motor gun boat was lost in 1944. |
| H-3, H-5, H-7, and H-8 | Imperial Japanese Navy | The H-2-class motor gun boats were lost in 1944 or 1945. |
| Hai Kan No. 10 | Imperial Japanese Navy | The training hulk, formerly the cruiser Tsushima, was sunk as a torpedo target in the Pacific Ocean off Miura, Kanagawa, Japan. |
| Herold | Norway | World War II: The cargo ship was bombed and sunk at Bergen, Norway in December 1944 or January 1945. |
| KFK 90 | Kriegsmarine | The training ship, a KFK-2-class naval drifter, was sunk sometime in 1944. |
| KFK 307 | Kriegsmarine | The KFK-2-class naval drifter was sunk sometime in 1944. |
| HMS LCP(L) 540 | Royal Navy | The landing craft personnel (large) was lost sometime in 1944. |
| HMS LCP(L) 760 | Royal Navy | The landing craft personnel (large) was lost sometime in 1944. |
| HMS LCP(R) 640 | Royal Navy | The landing craft personnel (ramped) were lost sometime in 1944. |
| HMS LCP(R) 652\ | Royal Navy | The landing craft personnel (ramped) were lost sometime in 1944. |
| HMS LCP(R) 669 | Royal Navy | The landing craft personnel (ramped) were lost sometime in 1944. |
| HMS LCP(R) 735 | Royal Navy | The landing craft personnel (ramped) were lost sometime in 1944. |
| HMS LCP(R) 978 | Royal Navy | The landing craft personnel (ramped) were lost sometime in 1944. |
| HMS LCP(R) 982 | Royal Navy | The landing craft personnel (ramped) were lost sometime in 1944. |
| HMS LCP(R) 987 | Royal Navy | The landing craft personnel (ramped) were lost sometime in 1944. |
| HMS LCP(R) 989 | Royal Navy | The landing craft personnel (ramped) were lost sometime in 1944. |
| HMS LCP(R) 991 | Royal Navy | The landing craft personnel (ramped) were lost sometime in 1944. |
| HMS LCP(R) 993 | Royal Navy | The landing craft personnel (ramped) were lost sometime in 1944. |
| HMS LCP(R) 1023 | Royal Navy | The landing craft personnel (ramped) were lost sometime in 1944. |
| Libby, McNeill & Libby V No. 6 | United States | The 79-gross register ton, 71-foot (21.6 m) scow sank in the waters of the Territory of Alaska sometime in 1944. |
| M 4255 | Kriegsmarine | The minesweeper, a KFK-2-class naval drifter, was sunk sometime in 1944. |
| Nichiyu Maru | Imperial Japanese Navy | World War II: The Nichiyu Maru-class auxiliary transport ship was torpedoed and damaged by USS Halibut (United States Navy) about 200 nautical miles (370 km; 230 mi) south west of Guam (10°25′N 145°25′E) on 2 March 1943. She was towed to Guam and declared unrepairable. The ship was further damaged on 12 June and 25 June 1944. The transport was apparently sunk during the Battle of Guam between 25 June and 10 August 1944 when she was removed from the IJN List. |
| Ouessant | Kriegsmarine | The floating power station, formerly the submarine Ouessant (French Navy), was scuttled at Pauillac, France. |
| S 14 | Kriegsmarine | The S 14-class E-boat sunk in the English Channel. |
| SS-4 | Imperial Japanese Navy | The SS-class landing ship was lost in August 1944 in the Philippines. |
| SS-8 | Imperial Japanese Navy | The SS-class landing ship was lost in 1944 or 1945. |
| SS-10 | Imperial Japanese Navy | The SS-class landing ship was lost in 1944 or 1945. |
| Shoei Maru | Japan | World War II: The cargo ship was torpedoed and sunk in the South China Sea west of Luzon, Philippines by USS Paddle and USS Hammerhead (both United States Navy) sometime between 25 November and 18 January 1945. |
| Strasbourg II | Kriegsmarine | Strasbourg II World War II: The barracks ship was scuttled at Lorient, France. |
| T-134 | Imperial Japanese Navy | The No. 103-class landing ship ran aground and was abandoned on the east coast of Iwo Jima, Kazan Retto (24°47′N 141°20′E) sometime on or after 2 August. The wreck was destroyed by a storm on 4 October. |
| Tempo 7 | Kriegsmarine | World War II: The tanker was scuttled. She was refloated in December 1944. Subsequently repaired and returned to French service as Vendémiaire. |
| U-743 | Kriegsmarine | World War II: The Type VIIC submarine sank in the Atlantic Ocean north of Ireland (55°38′N 7°26′W) in September or October 1944 whilst on patrol with the loss of all 50 crew. Cause unknown. |
| UJ-2306 | Kriegsmarine | The submarine chaser, a KFK-2-class naval drifter, was sunk sometime in 1944. |
| V 5509 | Kriegsmarine | The Vorpostenboot, a former S 14-class motor torpedo boat, was sunk in La Manch sometime in 1944. |
| Victoria | Germany | World War II: The cargo ship was bombed and severely damaged at Hamburg whilst fitting out. She was subsequently laid up. She was completed in 1947–49 and entered Yugoslav service as Makedonija. |
| Viking 1 | Nazi Germany | World War II: The ferry was scuttled end of 1944 in the Repparfjord, Finnmark, Norway. |
| Wilma G | United States | The 8-gross register ton, 29.6-foot (9.0 m) fishing vessel sank at the entrance to Prince William Sound off Montague Island, Territory of Alaska. |
| Unknown shipwreck | | An unknown wreck was recorded at (30°12′N 87°13′W) south of Pensacola, Florida in 1944 in 80 feet (24 m) of water with a stack and masts above water. |
| Unknown shipwreck | | An unknown wreck was recorded east of Marathon, Florida at (24°42′N 80°52′W) on 31 March 1944. |
