= Play date =

A play date is an arranged appointment for children to get together and play.

Play date or playdate or variation, may also refer to:

== Music ==
- Play Date (album), a 2002 album by Euge Groove, or the title track
- "Play Date" (song), a 2015 song by Melanie Martinez
- "Playdate", a 2018 song by Exo-CBX song, from Blooming Days
- Play Date, a children's music project by Shanti Wintergate

== Television ==
- Playdate (British TV series), a 2006 British television series
- Playdate (Canadian TV series), a 1961–64 Canadian TV series
- "Play Date" (Adventure Time), a 2013 episode of Adventure Time
- "Playdates" (Modern Family), a 2016 episode of Modern Family
- "Playdate" (Superstore), a 2020 episode of Superstore

== Other uses ==
- Playdate (film), a 2025 American action-comedy film
- Playdate (console), a handheld video game console developed by Panic

== See also ==
- The Stolen Girl, 2025 TV series based on Alex Dahl novel Playdate
