= Shanto (disambiguation) =

Shanto is a form of Guyanese music.

Shanto may also refer to:

- Shanto, Wolaita, a town in Wolaita, Ethiopia
- Shanto Iyengar, American political scientist and academic
- Najmul Hossain Shanto (born 1998), Bangladeshi cricketer
- Vasil Shanto (1913–1944), Albanian politician

== See also ==
- Shantou (disambiguation)
- Shanta, a character in the ancient Indian epic Ramayana
- Shanta (given name), an Indian feminine given name
