= Sant =

Sant may refer to:

== People ==
- Sant (surname)

== Places ==
- Sant State, a former princely salute state in Rewa Kantha, Gujarat, India
- Sant, Övörkhangai, a district in Mongolia
- Sant, Selenge, a district in Mongolia
- Șanț, a commune in Bistriţa-Năsăud County, Romania
- Șanț River, a tributary of the Trotuş River in Romania

== Religion ==
- Sant (religion), in Hinduism, Jainism, and Buddhism, an enlightened human being, commonly translated as "Saint"
- Sant Joan (disambiguation)

== Other ==
- Sant (card game), an early name for the game of Piquet
- Sant tree (Acacia nilotica), a tree species found in Africa
- Teniente General Benjamín Matienzo International Airport, Argentina (ICAO code: SANT)

== See also ==
- Sants (disambiguation)
- Dewi Sant (disambiguation)
- Van Sant (disambiguation)
- Santa (disambiguation)
- Shant (disambiguation)
- Shantha (disambiguation)
- Shanti (disambiguation)
