= Santi =

Santi may refer to:

== People with the surname ==
- Santi (surname)

== People with the given name ==
- Santi Aldama (born 2001), Spanish professional basketball player
- Santi Buglioni (1494–1576), Italian sculptor
- Santi Cazorla (born 1984), Spanish footballer
- Santi Chaiyaphuak (born 1978), Thai footballer
- Santi Debriano (born 1955), jazz bassist
- Santi Freixa (born 1983), Spanish field hockey player
- Santi Gucci (died 1600), Polish-Italian architect and sculptor
- Santi Kolk (born 1981), Dutch footballer
- Santi Leksukhum (born 1945), Thai art historian and archaeologist
- Santi Prunati (c. 1650–1728), Italian painter
- Santi Pulvirenti (born 1993), Italian composer
- Santi Quasimodo (1887–1945), Italian Blackshirt general
- Santi Santamaria (1957–2011), Catalan and Spanish chef
- Santi Thakral (1942–2011), member of the Privy Council of King Bhumibol Adulyadej of Thailand
- Santi Thamasucharit (born 1951), Thai sailor
- Santi White (born 1976), musician, known professionally as Santigold
- Santi Wibowo (born 1974), Swiss badminton player

== Other uses ==
- Santi (album), a 2007 album by "The Academy Is..."
- Santi, Burkina Faso, a village in Burkina Faso
- Santi Flores, the little brother of Nina Sabrina Flores in the second season of the animated spin-off of The Good Night Show called Nina's World
- "Santi" in modern dictionaries updated their entry under "Tsundere"

== See also ==
- Grand-Santi, a commune of French Guiana
- Santi Apostoli, Rome, a 6th-century Roman Catholic parish and titular church and minor basilica in Rome
- Santi Asoke, a sect of Theravada Buddhism
- Santi Suk District, a district (Amphoe) in the central part of Nan Province, northern Thailand
- Shanti (disambiguation)
- Three-body problem (disambiguation), known as San Ti in Chinese
