= Shanta (disambiguation) =

Shanta is a character in the Hindu epic poem Ramayana.

Shanta may also refer to:

- Shanta (given name)
- Shanta Gold, a gold mining company operating in Tanzania
- Shanta Holdings Limited, a diversified conglomerate based in Dhaka, Bangladesh
- Shanta Creek, Alaska, site of the 2009 Shanta Creek Wildfire

== See also ==
- Shanta Pinnacle, Dhaka, Bangladesh, a commercial skyscraper, the tallest building in the country
- Shantha, a given name and surname
- Shantha Biotechnics, an Indian biotechnology company
