= List of ship decommissionings in 1945 =

The list of ship decommissionings in 1945 is a chronological list of ships decommissioned in 1945. In cases where no official decommissioning ceremony was held, the date of withdrawal from service may be used instead. For ships lost at sea, see list of shipwrecks in 1945 instead.

Date	Operator	Ship	Class and type	Fate and other notes	Ref
15 January	Royal Navy	Charlestown	Town-class destroyer	in reserve at Grangemouth and scrapped	
13 March	Royal Navy	Castleton	Town-class destroyer	reserve at Grangemouth; scrapped in 1947	
9 April	Royal Navy	Biter	Avenger-class escort carrier	transferred to the United States Navy, then to the French Navy as Dixmude	
23 April	United States Navy	Montgomery	Wickes-class destroyer	sold for scrap	
7 May	Kriegsmarine	Prinz Eugen	cruiser	surrendered to the United States at Copenhagen	
1 June	United States Navy	Gamble	Wickes-class destroyer	sunk for disposal	
20 July	United States Navy	Lea	Wickes-class destroyer	scrapped	
July (unknown date)	Royal Navy	Lancaster	Town-class destroyer	reduced to reserve	
August (unknown date)	Royal Navy	Clare	Town-class destroyer	reduced to reserve at Greenock, Scotland	
28 September	United States Navy	Aaron Ward	Robert H. Smith-class destroyer minelayer	sold for scrap in 1946	
9 October	Royal Navy	Invicta	Landing Ship, Infantry	returned to merchant service as SS Invicta	
9 October	United States Navy	Talbot	Wickes-class destroyer	scrapped	
10 October	United States Navy	Chew	Wickes-class destroyer	scrapped	
12 October	United States Navy	Waters	Wickes-class destroyer	scrapped	
19 October	United States Navy	Ramsay	Wickes-class destroyer	sold for scrap	
24 October	United States Navy	Sangamon	Sangamon-class escort carrier	scrapped	
26 October	United States Navy	Sapelo	Patoka-class oiler	sold for scrap	
2 November	United States Navy	Rathburne	Wickes-class destroyer	scrapped	
9 November	United States Navy	Schley	Wickes-class destroyer	scrapped	
9 November	United States Navy	Stringham	Wickes-class destroyer	scrapped	
14 November	United States Navy	Crane	Wickes-class destroyer	scrapped	
29 November	Royal Navy	Tracker	Attacker-class escort carrier	returned to the United States and sold as merchant Corrientes	
29 November	Royal Navy	Searcher	Attacker-class escort carrier	returned to the United States and sold as merchant Captain Theo	
4 December	United States Navy	Dent	Wickes-class destroyer	scrapped	
6 December	Royal Navy	Shah	Attacker-class escort carrier	returned to the United States and sold as merchant Salta	
8 December	United States Navy	Dorsey	Wickes-class destroyer	destroyed	
22 December	Allied-occupied Germany	Greif	seaplane tender	surrendered to the United States and transferred to the French Navy as Marcel Le Bihan	
29 December	Royal Navy	Hunter	Attacker-class escort carrier	returned to the United States and sold as merchant Almdijk	
29 December	Royal Navy	Stalker	Attacker-class escort carrier	returned to the United States and sold as merchant Riouw	
unknown date	Royal Navy	Thane	Attacker-class escort carrier	returned to the United States and scrapped in 1946	
