= Asante =

Asante may refer to:

- Asante people, an ethnic group in Ghana
- Asante Empire
- Asante (name)
- Asante dialect, a dialect of the Akan languages
- Asante Kotoko S.C., a Ghanaian professional association football club
- Asante (album), 1974 jazz album by McCoy Tyner
- Asanté Technologies, a defunct networking equipment vendor

== See also ==
- Anglican Diocese of Asante Mampong
- R v Asante-Mensah, a leading Supreme Court of Canada decision
- Ashanti (disambiguation)
