= List of shipwrecks in 1945 =

The list of shipwrecks in 1945 includes ships sunk, foundered, grounded, or otherwise lost during 1945.

table of contents
1945
Jan	Feb	Mar	Apr
May	Jun	Jul	Aug
Sep	Oct	Nov	Dec
Unknown date

== Unknown date ==
List of shipwrecks: Unknown date 1945
Ship	State	Description
Akagi Maru	Japan	The merchant ship sank in a typhoon. She was raised, repaired, and returned to service.
Alice L. Pendleton	United States	The 228-foot (69 m), 1,349-gross-register-ton four-masted lumber schooner was abandoned at the Palmer Shipyard on the west side of the Mystic River in Noank, Connecticut, sometime during the 1940s, gradually rotted away, and settled on the river bottom in 10 feet (3.0 m) of water.
Arare Maru	Imperial Japanese Army or Imperial Japanese Navy	World War II: The tanker (possibly renamed Nanjo Maru) was found sunk at Singapore by British forces. Returned to her Dutch owners at time of capture.
Bourgas	Bulgaria	World War II: The cargo ship was sunk at Thessaloniki, Greece. The wreck was scrapped in situ in March 1948.
Ceram Maru	Japan	World War II: The hulk of the Standard Type 2TM tanker was raised in late 1945 in Manila harbor during harbor clearance, taken to deep water and scuttled.
Dinteldyk	Netherlands	World War II: The burnt out cargo ship was scuttled as a blockship at Rotterdam, South Holland.
Dockenhuben	Germany	World War II: The transport ship was bombed and sunk in Allied air raids at Hamburg between 30 March and 8 April. She was refloated in 1948, repaired and entered West German service in 1950 as Clare Grammerstorf.
Duchess	Australia	The lighter was deliberately scuttled near Rottnest Island. Wreck remains undiscovered.
Elbing	Germany	World War II: The cargo ship was damaged by artillery shelling and beached at Schweinesand. She was later repaired and returned to service.
F 113	Kriegsmarine	The Type A Marinefahrprahm was sunk sometime in 1945.
F 212	Kriegsmarine	The Type B Marinefahrprahm was sunk sometime in 1945.
F 823	Kriegsmarine	The Type D Marinefahrprahm was sunk sometime in 1945.
F 923	Kriegsmarine	The Type DM minelayer Marinefahrprahm was sunk sometime in 1944 or 1945.
F 949	Kriegsmarine	The Type DM minelayer Marinefahrprahm was sunk sometime in 1944 or 1945.
F 964	Kriegsmarine	The Type D Marinefahrprahm was sunk sometime in 1944 or 1945.
F 1157	Kriegsmarine	The Type D Marinefahrprahm was sunk sometime in early 1945.
F 1158	Kriegsmarine	The Type D Marinefahrprahm was sunk sometime in early 1945.
F 1165	Kriegsmarine	The Type D Marinefahrprahm was sunk sometime in 1944 or 1945.
F 1179	Kriegsmarine	The Type D Marinefahrprahm was sunk sometime in 1945.
F 1180	Kriegsmarine	The Type D Marinefahrprahm was sunk sometime in 1945.
F 1192	Kriegsmarine	The Type D Marinefahrprahm was sunk sometime in 1945.
Futagami	Imperial Japanese Navy	The Hashima-class salvage tugboat sank off Dublon Island, Truk during or after September. The wreck appeared to have been scuttled.
Gemlock	United Kingdom	World War II: The cargo ship was damaged in the Mediterranean Sea.
Gyoraitei No. 11	Imperial Japanese Navy	The Gyoraitei T51-class motor torpedo boat was lost in 1945.
Gyoraitei No. 14	Imperial Japanese Navy	The Gyoraitei T51-class motor torpedo boats were lost in 1945.
Gyoraitei No. 15	Imperial Japanese Navy	The Gyoraitei T51-class motor torpedo boats were lost in 1945.
Gyoraitei No. 16	Imperial Japanese Navy	The Gyoraitei T51-class motor torpedo boats were lost in 1945.
Gyoraitei No. 17	Imperial Japanese Navy	The Gyoraitei T51-class motor torpedo boats were lost in 1945.
Gyoraitei No. 114	Imperial Japanese Navy	The Q/Gyoraitei No. 114-class motor torpedo boat was lost in 1944 or 1945.
Gyoraitei No. 233	Imperial Japanese Navy	The Gyoraitei No. 31-class motor torpedo boat was lost in 1944 or 1945.
Gyoraitei No. 245	Imperial Japanese Navy	The Gyoraitei No. 38-class motor torpedo boat was lost in 1945.
Gyoraitei No. 254	Imperial Japanese Navy	The Gyoraitei No. 38-class motor torpedo boat was lost in 1945.
Gyoraitei No. 258	Imperial Japanese Navy	The Gyoraitei No. 38-class motor torpedo boat was lost in 1945.
Gyoraitei No. 549	Imperial Japanese Navy	The Gyoraitei No. 14-class motor torpedo boat was lost in 1945.
Gyoraitei No. 869	Imperial Japanese Navy	The Gyoraitei No. 14-class motor torpedo boat was lost in 1945.
Gyoraitei No. 870	Imperial Japanese Navy	The Gyoraitei No. 14-class motor torpedo boat was lost in 1945.
Gyoraitei No. 871	Imperial Japanese Navy	The Gyoraitei No. 14-class motor torpedo boat was lost in 1945.
Gyoraitei No. 872	Imperial Japanese Navy	The Gyoraitei No. 14-class motor torpedo boat was lost in 1945.
Gyoraitei No. 873	Imperial Japanese Navy	The Gyoraitei No. 14-class motor torpedo boat was lost in 1945.
Gyoraitei No. 874	Imperial Japanese Navy	The Gyoraitei No. 14-class motor torpedo boat was lost in 1945.
Gyoraitei No. 875	Imperial Japanese Navy	The Gyoraitei No. 14-class motor torpedo boat was lost in 1945.
Gyoraitei No. 876	Imperial Japanese Navy	The Gyoraitei No. 14-class motor torpedo boat was lost in 1945.
Gyoraitei No. 877	Imperial Japanese Navy	The Gyoraitei No. 14-class motor torpedo boat was lost in 1945.
Gyoraitei No. 879	Imperial Japanese Navy	The Gyoraitei No. 14-class motor torpedo boat was lost in 1945.
Gyoraitei No. 883	Imperial Japanese Navy	The Gyoraitei No. 14-class motor torpedo boat was lost in 1945.
Gyoraitei No. 1113	Imperial Japanese Navy	The Gyoraitei No. 15-class motor torpedo boat was lost in 1945.
Gutzon Borglum	United States	The Liberty ship was damaged in a typhoon. She was refloated but collided with a United States Navy tug and was declared a constructive total loss.
H-3	Imperial Japanese Navy	The H-2-class motor gunboat was lost in 1944 or 1945.
H-5	Imperial Japanese Navy	The H-2-class motor gunboat was lost in 1944 or 1945.
H-7	Imperial Japanese Navy	The H-2-class motor gunboat was lost in 1944 or 1945.
H-8	Imperial Japanese Navy	The H-2-class motor gunboat was lost in 1944 or 1945.
H-46	Imperial Japanese Navy	The H-61-class motor gunboat was lost in 1945.
H-113	Imperial Japanese Navy	The H-61-class motor gunboat was lost in 1945.
Ignace Paderewski	United States	The Liberty ship was stranded in a typhoon and was severely damaged. She was declared a constructive total loss.
V 625 Johann Schulte	Kriegsmarine	The vorpostenboot was sunk in French waters sometime in 1945.
Horch I	Kriegsmarine	The training ship, a KFK-2-class naval drifter, was sunk sometime in 1945.
Horch II	Kriegsmarine	The training ship, a KFK-2-class naval drifter, was sunk sometime in 1945.
KFK 203	Kriegsmarine	The KFK-2-class naval drifter, finished as a sailing vessel, was sunk sometime in early 1945.
KFK 204	Kriegsmarine	The KFK-2-class naval drifter, finished as a sailing vessel, was sunk sometime in early 1945.
King Edwin	United Kingdom	The cargo ship was scuttled off Malta.
NO 42	Kriegsmarine	The KFK-2-class naval drifter was sunk sometime in 1945.
Ossag III	United Kingdom	The tanker was wrecked at Hamburg in or before May 1945.
Otto Leonhardt	Germany	The cargo ship was sunk at Venice, Italy in or before March 1945. She was refloated in December, repaired, and entered Italian service in 1947 as Albatros.
Prince George	Canada	The steamer was destroyed by fire at Ketchikan, Territory of Alaska. She later was towed away and scrapped. (Look 22/09/1945)
SS-8	Imperial Japanese Navy	The SS-class landing ship was lost in 1944 or 1945.
SS-10	Imperial Japanese Navy	The SS-class landing ship was lost in 1944 or 1945.
SS-11	Imperial Japanese Navy	The SS-class landing ship was lost in the spring of 1945.
SS-14	Imperial Japanese Navy	The SS-class landing ship was lost in 1945.
SS-15	Imperial Japanese Navy	The SS-class landing ship was lost in 1945.
SS-24	Imperial Japanese Navy	World War II: The incomplete SS-class landing ship was sunk at Osaka in 1945.
Saginaw II	United States	The 92-gross-register-ton, 70.2-foot (21.4 m) scow sank off the coast of Southeast Alaska at 57°35′N 136°05′W, between Slocum Arm (57.5094°N 135.9288°W) and Khaz Bay (57.5651°N 136.1091°W).
Samuel L. Jeffery	United States	The Liberty ship was damaged. She was declared a constructive total loss.
San Marco	Regia Marina	End of World War II: The target ship, a former San Giorgio-class armored cruiser captured by the Germans in September 1943, was found sunk in the harbor at La Spezia, Italy, at the end of World War II.
Sperrbrecher 123 Sparta	Kriegsmarine	World War II: The Sperrbrecher was sunk at Oneglia, Italy in or before May 1945.She was refloated on 20 May 1946, repaired and entered Italian service in 1947 as Sparta.
UF-2	Kriegsmarine	End of World War II: The Aurore-class submarine was scuttled at Gotenhafen, Pomerania sometime after 5 July.
U-3502	Kriegsmarine	World War II: The Type XXI submarine was bombed and damaged at Hamburg. She was consequently withdrawn from service on 3 May and scrapped post-war.
Vs 248	Kriegsmarine	The vorpostenboot, a KFK-2-class naval drifter, was sunk sometime in 1945.
W. P. Few	United States	The Liberty ship became stranded and was declared a constructive total loss.
Yu 10	Imperial Japanese Army	The Type 3 submergence transport vehicle sank in a storm at Kuchinotsu, Japan. She subsequently was scrapped.
Yu 11	Imperial Japanese Army	The Type 3 submergence transport vehicle sank in a storm at Mikuriya, Japan. She subsequently was scrapped.
Yu 12	Imperial Japanese Army	The Type 3 submergence transport vehicle sank in a storm at Kuchinotsu, Japan. She subsequently was scrapped.
Yu 13	Imperial Japanese Army	The Type 3 submergence transport vehicle sank in a storm at Mikuriya, Japan. She subsequently was scrapped.
Yu 14	Imperial Japanese Army	The Type 3 submergence transport vehicle sank in a storm at Mikuriya, Japan. She subsequently was scrapped.
Yu 24	Imperial Japanese Army	The Type 3 submergence transport vehicle was lost in an accident.
Yu 1007	Imperial Japanese Army	The surrendered Type 3 submergence transport vehicle sank in a storm at Mikuriya, Japan, in either 1945 or 1946. She later was salvaged, and was scrapped in January 1948.
Yu 3002	Imperial Japanese Army	The Type 3 submergence transport vehicle sank in a storm.
