= Shanti =

Shanti or Shanthi may refer to:

== In Sanskrit ==
- Inner peace, a state of being mentally and spiritually at peace, with enough knowledge and understanding to keep oneself strong in the face of discord or stress
- Kshanti, one of the paramitas of Buddhism
- Shanti Mantras or "Peace Mantras", Hindu prayers or sacred utterances believed by practitioners to have religious, magical or spiritual powers
- Shanti Parva, a book of the Mahabharata

== People ==
- Shanthi (actress), Indian actress
- Shanthi (choreographer), Indian choreographer and actress
- Shanti Devi (1926–1987), Indian woman at the center of a case of supposed reincarnation
- Shanti Devi (Uttar Pradesh politician) (born 1937), Indian politician
- Shanti Roney (born 1970), Swedish actor
- Shanti Snyder (born 1981), Japanese/English lyricist, singer, songwriter, and music TV host
- Oliver Shanti (born 1948), New Age musician
- Shanti Wintergate, musician/writer
- Shanthi Krishna (born 1960), Tamil and Malayalam movie actress
- Shanthi Lekha or Rita Irene Quyn (1929–2009), Sri Lankan actress
- Santhi Soundarajan or Santhi Soundararajan (born 1981), Indian athlete
- Princess Shanti Singh of Nepal (1940–2001), princess of Nepal and queen of Bajhang
- Chaikra Shanti Maximus, Belgian fashion model
- Shanti Pereira, Singaporean sprinter
- Shantipriya, Indian actress

== Characters ==
- A protagonist of Bankim Chandra Chatterjee's 1882 novel Anandamath
- A character in the 2003 Disney cartoon The Jungle Book 2
- A character in the 1990 film Agneepath
- Shanti Priya, a character in the 2007 Indian film Om Shanti Om

== Film and television ==
- Shanti (TV series), a 1994 Indian television series
- Shanti Shanti Shanti, a 1998 Indian Kannada-language film
- Shanti (film), a 2004 Indian film starring Bhavana
- Santhi (1965 film), a 1965 Indian film
- An important term in the 2006 film Children of Men

== Music ==
- Shanti (band), an Indian-American group of the early 1970s
- Shanti (Hitomi Shimatani album), 2002
- Shanti (Aiko Kitahara album), 2007
- ”Shanti” a song by Don Cherry from the 1977 album Hear & Now
- "Om Shanti" a song by Alice Coltrane from the 1987 album Divine Songs
- "Shanti", a song by Banco de Gaia from the 1994 album Maya
- "Shanti", a song by Béla Fleck and the Flecktones from the 1998 album Left of Cool
- "Shanti / Ashtangi", a 1998 song by Madonna from the album Ray of Light
- "Shanti" (song), a 2002 single by Hitomi Shimatani
- "Shanti", a song by Ferry Corsten from the 2008 album Twice in a Blue Moon
- "Shanti Shanti Shanti", a song by Babymetal from the 2019 album Metal Galaxy
- "Shanti", a song by Lexie Liu from the 2022 album The Happy Star
- A recording alias for the artist best known as "Yves Tumor"

== Other uses ==
- Shanthi (elephant) (1975-2020), Asian elephant gifted to the United States by Sri Lanka in 1976
- Shantinatha, 16th Jain Tirthankara
- Shanti Project, a group providing support and guidance for people with life-threatening illnesses
- Shanthi Nagar or Shanthi Nagar Colony, a colony of Nalgonda, Andhra Pradesh
- Shanti Stupa, Ladakh, Jammu and Kashmir, India
- Shanti Theatre, a movie theatre in Chennai, Tamil Nadu

== See also ==
- "Shantih shantih shantih", a well-known phrase in the final line of T.S. Eliot's poem "The Waste Land"
- Santi (disambiguation)
- Shanty (disambiguation)
- Shantha (disambiguation)
- Sant (disambiguation)
- Shant (disambiguation)
- Ashanti (disambiguation)
