= Battaglioni M =

Italian special forces unit under the then-ruling National Fascist Party

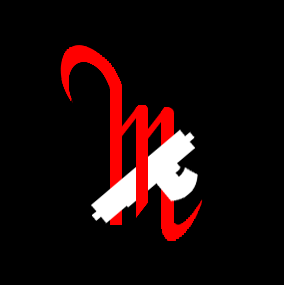
Banner of the M Battalions

The M Battalions (M standing for Mussolini) were an elite special forces unit of Italian Blackshirts during World War II.

== History ==
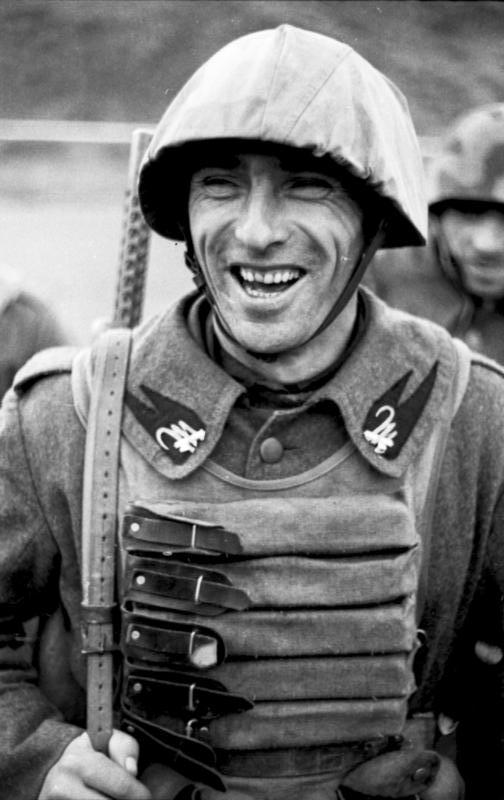
Soldier of an "M" battalion. On the collar we can see the gorget patches drawn with M for Mussolini that incorporates a fasces, a privilege granted by the Duce to voluntary departments by the legislative decree of 22 November 1941.

They were created during World War II, in October 1941 as a transformation and strengthening of the assault and mountain battalions of the Milizia Volontaria per la Sicurezza Nazionale (Blackshirts) which had particularly distinguished themselves in combat.

The first "M" battalions were those coming from the Galbiati Group (VIII of Varese, the XVI of Como and the XXIX of Arona), veterans of the Battle of Marizai, and the battalions of the 15th Assault Legion CC.NN. "Lioness" (XIV of Bergamo and XV of Brescia), mentioned in the war bulletin №248 of 10 February 1941, followed by other assault battalions always distinguished in war actions.

To further improve their war efficiency, the "M" battalions were subjected to special training courses at the "Campo Battaglioni M" in Rome-Trastevere, and were classified in the "M" Battalion Inspectorate of MVSN, who supervised the training and managed the replacement flow.

For operational use the "M" battalions were usually assigned directly to the dependencies of the Corps of the Army, with general reserve functions and from these reassigned in support of units engaged in particularly demanding actions. They were employed mainly in the Russian campaign, in the Greco-Italian war and for the planned invasion of Malta.

With the fall of the Fascist regime, on 25 July 1943, the XVI Battaglione "M" of Como, marching on Rome was stopped not far from the capital following an order given by the head of S.M. of the Militia, general Enzo Emilio Galbiati. The same "M" Division received the order between 25 and 26 July to continue the training activity. On September 8, the departments deployed north of the peninsula, in France and the Balkans largely adhered to the newborn Italian Social Republic, like those landed in Corsica they partly cooperated with the fascists and the Germans.

The departments passed to the RSI were absorbed by the National Republican Guard excluding the 1st Battalion "IX Settembre" which, established in September 1943 in Toulon, fought in Italy in various locations, also participating in the conflict of the landing of Anzio and on the eastern front.

== Structure and organization ==
"M" battalions could be structured as assault battalions or battalions of accompanying weapons.

=== Assault battalions ===
The assault battalions were organized as follows:

- HQ and hq platoon
- Scout platoon
- 3 company of assault troops.

Each company was in turn organized into:

- Command and command platoon
- 2 assault platoons
- machine gun platoon

=== Support weapon battalion ===
The accompanying weapons battalions were organized as follows:

- HQ and command platoon
- Company of 81mm mortars.
- Company of infantry support guns and anti-tank guns equipped with 47/32 gun.
- Machine-gun company

== Battalions ==
- V assault battalion "M" (from 5ª Legione "Valle Scrivia" of Tortona)
- VI assault battalion "M" (from Legione "Sforzesca" of Vigevano)
- VIII assault battalion "M" (from Legione "Cacciatori delle Alpi" of Varese)
- X assault battalion "M" (from Legione "Montebello" of Voghera)
- XII assault battalion "M" (from Legione "Monte Bianco" di Aosta)
- XIV assault battalion "M" (from Legione "Garibaldina" of Bergamo)
- XV assault battalion "M" (from Legione "Leonessa" of Brescia)
- XVI assault battalion "M" (from Legione "Alpina" of Como)
- XXIX assault battalion "M" (from Legione "Antonio Chinotto" of Arona)
- XXX assault battalion "M" (from Legione "Roberto Forni" of Novara)
- XXXIV assault battalion "M" (from Legione "Premuda" of Savona)
- XXXVIII assault battalion "M" (from Legione "Vittorio Alfieri" of Asti)
- XLI assault battalion "M" (from Legione "Cesare Battisti" of Trento)
- XLII assault battalion "M" (from Legione "Berica" of Vicenza)
- XLIII assault battalion "M" (from Legione "Piave" of Belluno)
- L assault battalion "M" (from Legione "Trevigiana" of Treviso)
- LX assault battalion "M" (from Legione "Istria" of Pola)
- LXIII assault battalion "M" (from Legione "Tagliamento" of Udine)
- LXXI assault battalion "M" (from Legione "Manfreda" of Faenza)
- LXXIX assault battalion "M" (from Legione "Cispadana" of Reggio Emilia)
- LXXXI assault battalion "M" (from Legione "Alberico da Barbiano" of Ravenna)
- LXXXV assault battalion "M" (from Legione "Apuana" of Massa)

== Deployment ==
=== The "M" battalions in the Balkans ===
The assault battalions "M" X (until February 1943), LXXI, LXXXI and LXXXV operated in the Balkans in garrison duties and counter-insurgency operations.

=== The "M" battalions on the Russian front ===
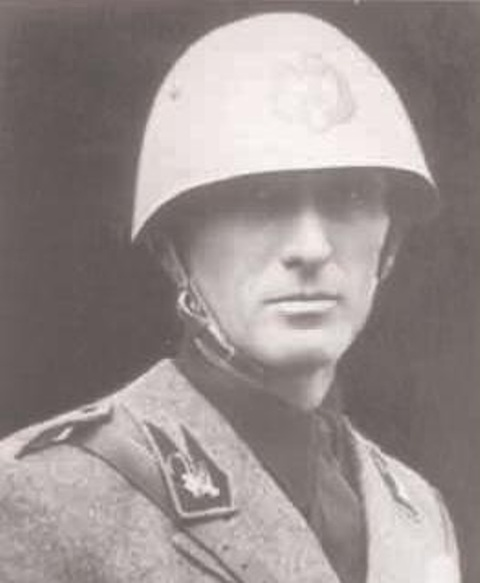
The "seniore"(colonel) Giacomo Comincioli of 15ª Blackshirt assault legion "Leonessa". On the collar we can observe the gorget patches with the red "M"

The "M" Battalions used on the eastern front they were framed in Groups, each consisting of two Battalion Groups "M", each consisting of two assault battalions and an accompanying weapons battalion, as follows:

Raggruppamento Camicie Nere "III Gennaio"

Group of "M" battalions "Tagliamento"

LXIII assault battalion "M"
LXXIX assault battalion "M"
LXIII support weapons battalion "Sassari" (of Royal Italian Army)

Group of "M" battalions "Montebello"

VI assault battalion"M"
XXX assault battalion "M"
XII support weapons battalion "M"

Raggruppamento Camicie Nere "XXIII Marzo"

Group of Battalion "M" "Leonessa"

XIV assault battalion "M"
XV assault battalion "M"
XXXVIII support weapons battalion "M"

Group of "M" battalions "Valle Scrivia"

V assault battalion "M"
XXXIV assault battalion "M"
XLI support weapons battalion "M"

The Black Shirts of the "Tagliamento" Group were not originally an "M" unit but were promoted to this qualification in the field as recognition of the value demonstrated during the operations of the CSIR (Italian Expeditionary Corps in Russia). As such, they were the only "M" battalions not to have been trained in the Battalions "M" Camp of Rome-Trastevere. The "M" Battalions repeatedly proved to be among the best units of the ARMIR (Italian Army in Russia), operating mainly in support of the XXXV Army Corps.

=== The "M" landing battalions for the invasion of Malta ===
Given the planned invasion of Malta (Operazione C3), the MVSN constituted a special landing group, the Battalions Group "M" of Black Landing Shirts, structured as follows:

HQ and command company
XLII landing battalion "M" "Vicenza"
XLIII landing battalion "M" "Belluno"
L landing battalion "M" "Treviso"
LX landing battalion "M" "Pola"
2 infantry support guns company with 47/32 guns
1 company 81mm mortar
1 company of guastatori (sappers)

With the cancellation of Operation C.3, the Black Landing Shirts were reorganized as two Battalion Groups, as follows:

I landing Blackshirt Battalion group "M"

XLIII landing battalion "M"
LX landing battalion "M"
V support weapons battalion (of Royal Italian Army)

The I Battaglioni Group participated in the occupation of Corsica, and remained a garrison until 8 September 1943, when it participated in the fighting against the Germans.

II landing Blackshirt Battalion group "M"

XLII landing battalion "M"
L landing battalion "M"
V support weapons battalion (of Royal Italian Army)

The II Battalion Group participated in the occupation of Corsica and then moved to France where it remained garrison in the area of Toulon until 8 September 1943, when it broke up with the other units of the 4th Army.

=== The "M" battalions in Tunisia ===
The X Assault Battalion "M" was transferred to Tunisia in February 1943 and initially assigned in support of the 136ª Armored division "Giovani Fascisti" on the Mareth line and then to the 101ª motorized division "Trieste" until the surrender of the Axis forces in Africa.

=== The Armored Black Shirts Division "M" ===
It was formed in May 1943 starting from the few survivors of the "M" Battalions returned from Russia and supplemented by volunteers. The unit, equipped with armoured vehicles supplied by the Germans, was still being trained at the time of the fall of fascism (25 July 1943), renamed the 136th Armored Division "Centaur II" and purged of its most markedly fascist elements, to then be dissolved after the armistice of 8 September 1943.

== Uniform ==
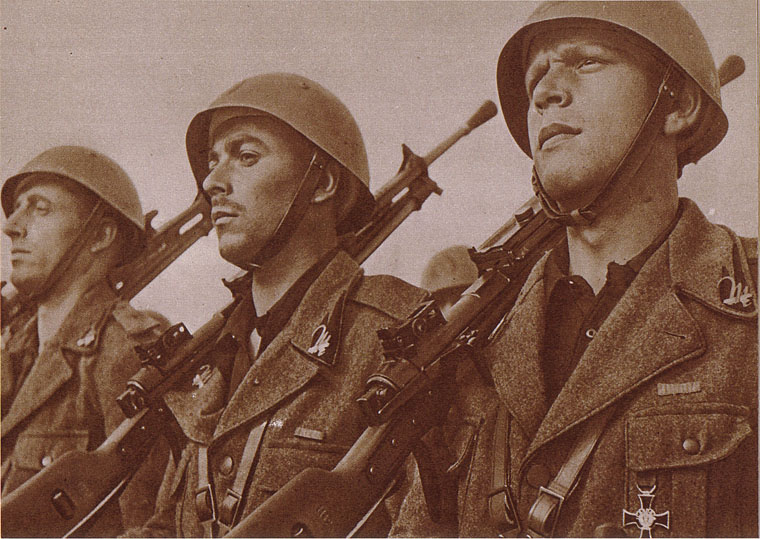
Italian soldiers of M Battalion of MVSN

The components of the Battalions "M" wore the normal uniforms of the MVSN, with the only difference of the black insignia on which the silver fasces used by the MVSN units instead of the stars of the Royal Italian Army was replaced by a fasces twisted with a letter "M "capitalized in red, reproducing the spelling of Mussolini.

Even the pennants of the various battalions used the same symbology: on them, made in the shape of a tail of swallow, the same red "M" embroidered with a littorium appeared, embroidered "Seguitemi" (which expressed loyalty to the Fatherland and to Fascism) with the same calligraphy as the "M" and the department number.
