= Sants (disambiguation) =

Sants is a neighborhood in Barcelona, Catalonia, Spain.

Sants may also refer to:

- Hector Sants, a British investment banker

== See also ==
- Sant (disambiguation)
