= Ashanti =

Ashanti may refer to:

- Ashanti people, an ethnic group in West Africa
  - Ashanti Empire, a pre-colonial West African state in what is now southern Ghana
  - Ashanti dialect or Asante, a literary dialect of the Akan language of southern Ghana
  - Ashanti Region, a region within Ghana
  - Ashanti (Crown Colony), a United Kingdom colony 1901–1957 in what is now Ghana
- Ashanti (singer) (born 1980), American singer-songwriter and actress
  - Ashanti (album), a 2002 album by Ashanti
- Ashanti (1979 film), a British-American film
- Ashanti (1982 film), an Indian film
- "Ashanti", a song by Zoheb Hassan from the 1983 album Young Tarang
- HMS Ashanti (F51), a Tribal-class destroyer launched in 1937
- HMS Ashanti (F117), a Tribal-class frigate launched in 1959

== People with the given name ==
- Ashanti Alston (born 1954), former Black Panther Party member
- Ashanti Johnson, American geochemist and chemical oceanographer
- Ashanti Obi (born 1952), Nigerian sprinter
- Backxwash (born 1991) Ashanti Mutinta, Zambian-Canadian rapper-singer

== See also ==
- Asante (disambiguation)
- Shanti (disambiguation)
- Ashanti Gold SC, a football club in Obuasi, Ashanti, Ghana
- Ashanti Goldfields Corporation, a gold mining company
- Bobo Ashanti, one of the Mansions of Rastafari
- Kahlil Ashanti (born 1973), American actor and writer
