= Shantha =

Shantha is a given name and surname which may refer to:

- Shantha Abeysekara, Sri Lankan politician
- Shantha Bandara, Sri Lankan politician
- Shantha Dange, Sri Lankan cricketer
- Shantha Francis, Anglican Bishop of Kurunegala, Sri Lanka
- Shantha Rangaswamy, Indian cricketer
- Shantha Roberts, TV presenter
- Shantha Sinha, anti-child labour activist
- K. W. Shantha Bandara, Sri Lankan politician
- Shantha Kalavitigoda, Sri Lankan cricketer
- Shantha Kottegoda, Sri Lankan cricketer
- J. Shantha, Indian politician
- K. G. Shantha, Sri Lanka navy officer
- Waruna Shantha, Sri Lankan cricketer

== See also ==
- Shanta (disambiguation)
- Shantaram (disambiguation)
- Shanti (disambiguation)
- Shant (disambiguation)
- Sant (disambiguation)
