= Santi Quasimodo =

- Born: 20 February 1887; Aragona, Kingdom of Italy
- Died: 1 May 1945 (aged 58) (disappeared); Brescia, Italy
- Military career
- Allegiance: Kingdom of Italy; Italian Social Republic
- Branch: Royal Italian Army; MVSN; Guardia Nazionale Repubblicana
- Rank: Major General
- Commands: 171st Blackshirt Legion; 167th Blackshirt Legion; 31st CCNN Legions Group "Sassari"; Blackshirt Group "Barca"; 13th Blackshirt Group; 9th Blackshirt Group; M Battalions Landing Group; 2nd "M" Battalion Landing Group
- Conflicts: Italo-Turkish War; World War I; Second Italo-Ethiopian War; World War II; Greco-Italian War; Italian occupation of France
- Awards: Silver Medal of Military Valor; Bronze Medal of Military Valor (twice)

Santi Quasimodo, also known as Sante Quasimodo (Aragona, 20 February 1887 – disappeared in Brescia, 1 May 1945) was an Italian Blackshirt general during World War II. He was the uncle of poet Salvatore Quasimodo.

== Biography ==
The son of Vincenzo Quasimodo and Rosa Papandrea, he was a career soldier. In 1912 he took part in the Italo-Turkish War as a Lieutenant in the Royal Italian Army, fighting in Libya and receiving a Bronze Medal of Military Valor. During the First World War he rose to the rank of Major and was awarded another bronze medal for military valor in November 1918. In 1921 he married Oliva Barbiera, who gave him four children.

After the war he joined the National Fascist Party (PNF), and in the second half of the 1920s he was transferred at his request from the Army to the Voluntary Militia for National Security (MVSN), with the rank of console (colonel) of the 171st Blackshirt Legion in Palermo. He was later transferred to Catania, at the command of the 167th Blackshirt Legion. In 1930 he became federal secretary of the PNF of Catania, where among other things he was the first president of Società Sportiva Catania.

In 1934 he was promoted to console generale (Brigadier General) and given command of the 31st CCNN Legions Group "Sassari". He participated in the Second Italo-Ethiopian War and was assigned to the Governorate of Addis Ababa in 1936; in 1937 he received a Silver Medal of Military Valor for a successful operation against Ethiopian armed bands in Southern Dankalia, at the command of the Blackshirt Group "Barca". In 1938 he was in command of the 13th Blackshirt Group in Verna and in 1940 he commanded the 9th Blackshirt Group in Bologna.

== Final years and disappearance ==
After Italy's entry into the Second World War in 1940, he fought on the Albanian front. He was then promoted to luogotenente generale (Major General) and given command of the M Battalions landing groups, stationed in Sardinia in 1942 for training in preparation for the planned invasion of Malta, which was not carried out. After the Axis occupation of southern France, he was stationed in Toulon, at the command of the 2nd "M" Battalion Landing Group.

After the Armistice of Cassibile he was arrested by the Germans, but was released thanks to the intervention of Marshal Rodolfo Graziani, of whom he was an old friend. He then joined the Italian Social Republic and was appointed general of the Republican National Guard (GNR), assigned to the GNR headquarters.

As the Italian Social Republic collapsed in late April 1945, he was hosted for a few days in Milan by his nephew Salvatore Quasimodo, then left. He disappeared in the Brescia area around 1 May 1945, and his body was never found.

== See also ==
- List of people who disappeared
