= Shanty =

Shanty may refer to:

== Buildings and developments ==
- Ice shanty, a portable shed placed on a frozen lake
- Shack or shanty, improvised housing, a type of primitive dwelling
- Shanty town, a settlement of shacks or shanties
- Logging camp, or shanty, a camp where lumberjacks live

== Geography ==
- Shanty Bay, in the Oro-Medonte township in south-central Ontario, Canada
- Shanty Hollow Lake, a reservoir located in Warren County and Edmonson County, Kentucky

== Music ==
- Sea shanty, a type of shipboard work-song
- "Shanty", a 1971 song by Jonathan Edwards from Jonathan Edwards
- "Shanty", a 1964 song by the Quests

== Other uses ==
- Shanty Hogan (1906–1967), Major League Baseball catcher
- Shanty (singer) (born 1978), Indonesian actress and singer
- Shanty Irish, 19th and 20th century term to categorize poor Irish people, particularly Irish Americans
- Sly-grog shop or shanty, an Australian term for an unlicensed hotel or liquor-store
- Shanty, a character in the video game Them's Fightin' Herds.

== See also ==
- Shandy, beer mixed with a soft drink
- Shanti (disambiguation)
