= Shant =

Shant may refer to:

== People ==
- Shant Harutyunyan, Armenian politician and activist
- Shant Kenderian, Iraqi-born United States citizen who became an American prisoner-of-war
- Shant Sargsyan (born 2002), Armenian chess grandmaster
- Levon Shant otherwise Լեւոն Շանթ, Levon Nahashbedian, Levon Seghposian (1869–1951), Armenian playwright

== Other uses ==
- Shant TV, a private television broadcasting company in Armenia
- Shant Alliance Nationalist Party, Armenian political party

== See also ==
- Sant (disambiguation)
- Shantha (disambiguation)
- Shanti (disambiguation)
