= Shantaram =

Shantaram may refer to any of the following:

- Shantaram Athavale (1910–1975), Indian film director and author
- Shantaram Balwant Mujumdar, Indian academic
- Shantaram More, Indian politician
- Shantaram Naik (1946–2018), Indian politician
- Shantaram Potdukhe (1933–2018), Indian politician
- Shantaram Siddi, Indian politician
- V. Shantaram (1901–1990), Indian filmmaker, film producer and actor
- Shantaram (novel), a novel written by Gregory David Roberts
  - Shantaram (TV series), a 2022 TV series based on the novel

== See also ==
- Shantha (disambiguation)
- Rama (disambiguation)
