= Operation Herkules =

German code-name for plan for invasion of Malta during the Second World War

Coordinates: 35°53′N 14°30′E

- Part of Mediterranean and Middle East Theatre: of the Second World War
- Type: Invasion
- Location: Malta, 80 km (50 mi) south of Sicily
- Planned by: Generalmajor Kurt Student
- Objective: Eliminate Malta as a British air and naval base; Secure an uninterrupted flow of supplies across the Mediterranean
- Date: Planned for mid-July 1942
- Outcome: Cancelled in November 1942

Operation Herkules (German: Unternehmen Herkules; Italian: Operazione C3) was the German code-name given to an abortive plan for the invasion of Malta during the Second World War. Through air and sea landings, the Italians and Germans hoped to eliminate Malta as a British air and naval base and secure an uninterrupted flow of supplies across the Mediterranean Sea to Axis forces in Libya and Egypt.

Extensive preparations were made for the invasion but the success of other Axis operations – including the Battle of Gazala (26 May to 21 June 1942), the Axis capture of Tobruk on 21 June and Operation Aïda, the pursuit of the Allies into Egypt – led to Herkules being postponed and then cancelled in November 1942.

== Origins ==
The Axis plan to invade Malta had its origin in Italian military studies conducted during the Second Italo-Abyssinian War in the mid-1930s. By 1938, Comando Supremo, the Italian army general staff, had estimated the amount of sea transport it would require to move military forces into North Africa, and identified the seizure of Malta as a prerequisite. An outline plan for a seaborne assault was drawn up and periodically revised; the Regia Marina initially showed little interest in it. The concept of an invasion was approved at a meeting between Adolf Hitler and Benito Mussolini from 29 to 30 April 1942.

== Axis plans and preparations ==
=== Airborne forces ===
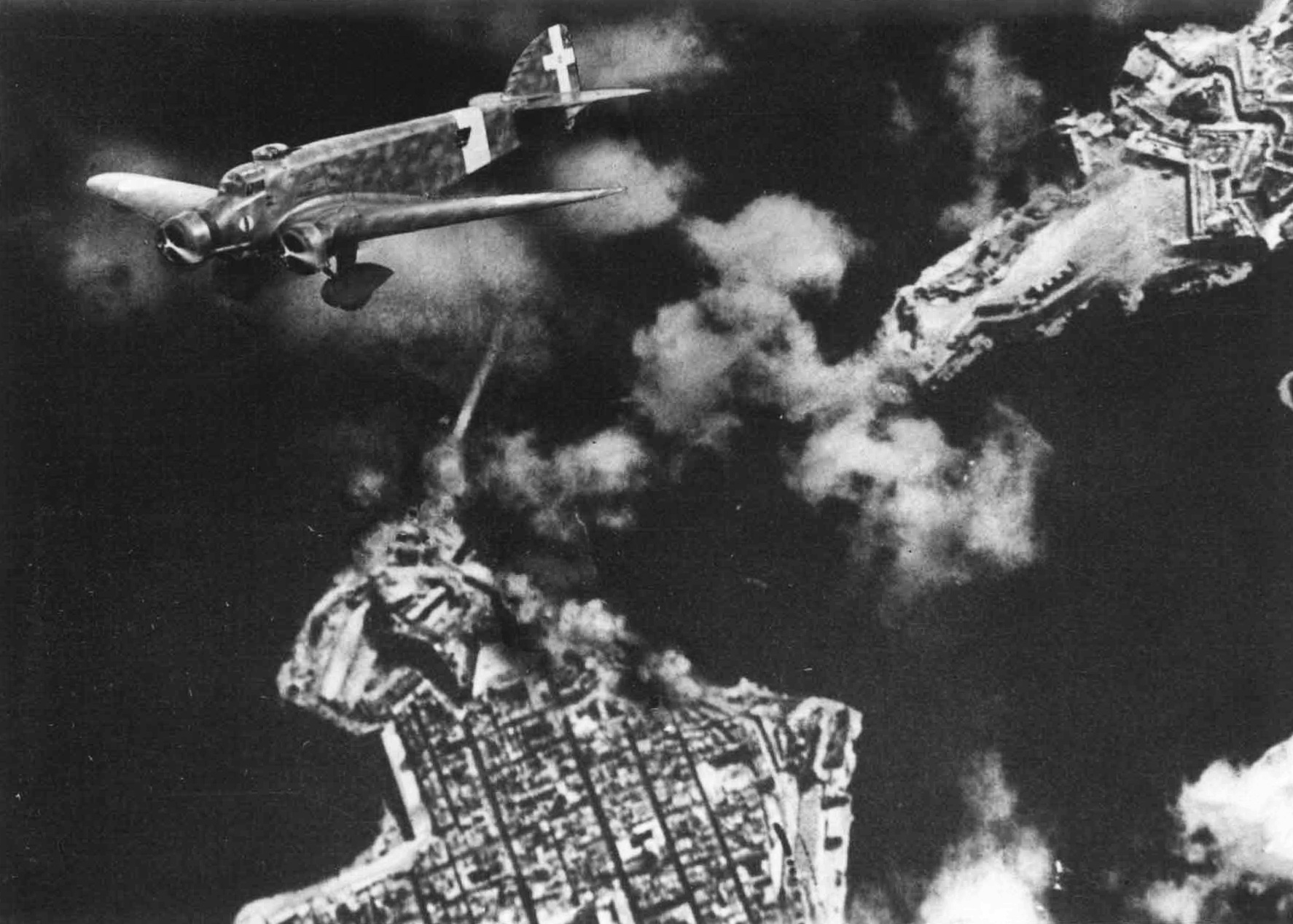
Italian bombing of the Grand Harbour, Malta

Command of the airborne component of Herkules was given to Generalmajor Kurt Student and Fliegerkorps XI. Student had commanded the German airborne assault in the Battle of Crete in May 1941. This time, Student had months to prepare and learn from the mistakes made on Crete. Knowledge of British defensive positions on Malta was extensive, thanks to meticulous aerial mapping by the Italians. Every fortification, artillery emplacement and AA battery was carefully scrutinised. Student claimed later that "We even knew the calibre of the coastal guns, and how many degrees they could be turned inland". Ten Gruppen of Junkers Ju 52 transports, with 500 aircraft, were allocated for the air landings, along with 300 DFS 230 gliders (carrying ten men each) and 200 larger Go 242 gliders (each carrying twenty-three men or a light vehicle/gun). Also to be included were two dozen Messerschmitt Me 321 Gigant gliders capable of carrying up to 200 fully equipped paratroopers or a 25 long tons (25 t) tank. These were to be towed by new He 111Z (Zwilling) five-engined versions of the He 111 medium bomber.

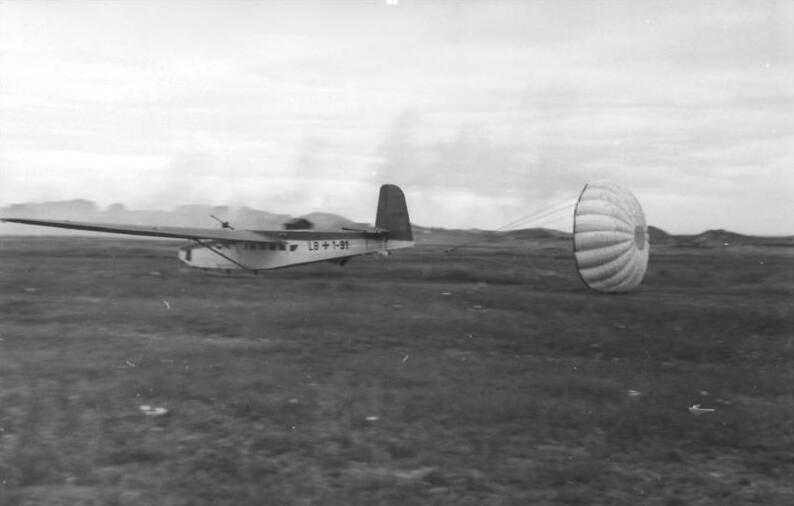
German DFS 230 assault gliders slated for Herkules were equipped with braking (or "crane") parachutes. These shortened the aircraft's landing run and allowed for more precise placement near an objective.

The Regia Aeronautica would contribute 180 to 220 transport aircraft, mostly three-engined SM.75s (carrying 24–28 men each), SM.81s (12–14 men each) and SM.82s (30–34 men each). Given the 90 mi (140 km) distance between Axis airfields on Sicily and the dropping zones over Malta, it was possible for the transport aircraft to make four round trips per day. The aircraft were to drop an Italian and a German airborne division onto the southern side of the island. The paratroopers had to secure the high ground behind the invasion beaches and seize a nearby airfield for Axis transport aircraft to land another division and supplies. Airborne units for the invasion comprised the German Fliegerdivision 7 (11,000 men), the Italian Paratroopers Division (7,500 men) and the airlanding 80th Infantry Division "La Spezia" (10,500 men), about 29,000 airborne troops. Preparations for the airborne assault included construction of three glider strips 25 mi (40 km) south of Mount Etna on Sicily.

=== Amphibious forces ===
The seaborne assault force comprised 70,000 Italian troops who were to make amphibious landings at two points on the south-eastern side of the island, in Marsaxlokk bay, the main effort falling upon a site named "Famagosta beach" and a smaller secondary landing at "Larnaca beach". Also to be seized were the lesser islands of Gozo and Comino. Amphibious feints would be directed at St. Paul's Bay, Mellieħa Bay and north-west of Valletta near the old Victoria Lines, to draw British attention away from the real landing sites. The main assault convoy was scheduled to begin landing on Malta just before midnight on the first day, after the airborne forces had landed in the afternoon and secured the heights above the beaches. The bulk of the first-wave assault troops would come from the 20th Infantry Division "Friuli" (10,000 men) and the 4th Infantry Division "Livorno" (9,850 men) of the Italian XXX Corps. Also included were 1,200 men from the 1st Assault Battalion and Loreto Battalion (both drawn from the Regia Aeronautica), two battalions of San Marco Marines (2,000 men), three battalions of Blackshirts (1,900 men General Santi Quasimodo) and 300 Nuotatori (a commando unit of San Marco Marines trained in ocean swimming and beach assault).

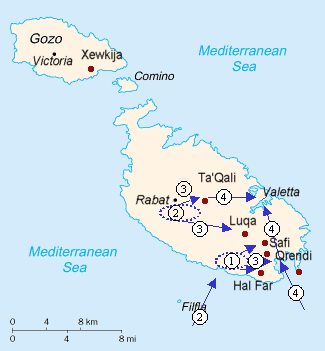
Operation Herkules Plan 1 – First airborne landings 2 – Second airborne landing and seaborne landings 3 – Breakout 4 – Capture of Valletta and landing of additional troops

A follow-up convoy would be mainly made up of troops from the Italian XVI Corps: the 26th Infantry Division "Assietta" (9,000 men), the 54th Infantry Division "Napoli" (8,900 men), artillery units (3,200 men) and the remainder of the 10th Armoured Grouping (3,800 men). The 1st Infantry Division "Superga" (9,200 men) plus a battalion of Blackshirts and 1,000 San Marco Marines were to be in position to land on the smaller island of Gozo in the early hours of the second day.

Armoured support for the invasion comprised sixty-four Italian Semovente 47/32 and eight heavier Semovente 75/18 self-propelled guns plus thirty L3 tankettes (comparable in size and armament to the British Bren Gun Carrier). Additional armour intended for Herkules included 2.Kompanie/Panzerabteilung z.b.V.66 (zur besonderen Verwendung [for special use]), a German unit commanded by Hans Bethke and partly equipped with captured Russian tanks. Ten assorted KV-1 [46 long tons (47 t)] and KV-2 [53 long tons (54 t)] heavy tanks were available. At least ten Italian motozattere (landing craft) were modified with reinforced flooring and internal ramps to carry these vehicles. Other tanks in the unit included captured Russian T-34 medium tanks, up-armoured German light tanks (five VK 1601s and five VK 1801s) plus twelve German Panzer IVGs armed with 75 mm guns.

Twenty German Panzer III tanks were also offered for use in the invasion but it is not known what unit these were to be drawn from. Plans to use the captured Russian tanks were at some point abandoned and all armour transported to Malta was to be Italian only. Two days were allowed for the amphibious assault and landing of the follow-up convoy, though this was dependent on quickly securing Marsaxlokk Bay to land heavier artillery pieces and a much higher tonnage of supplies.

=== Landing craft ===
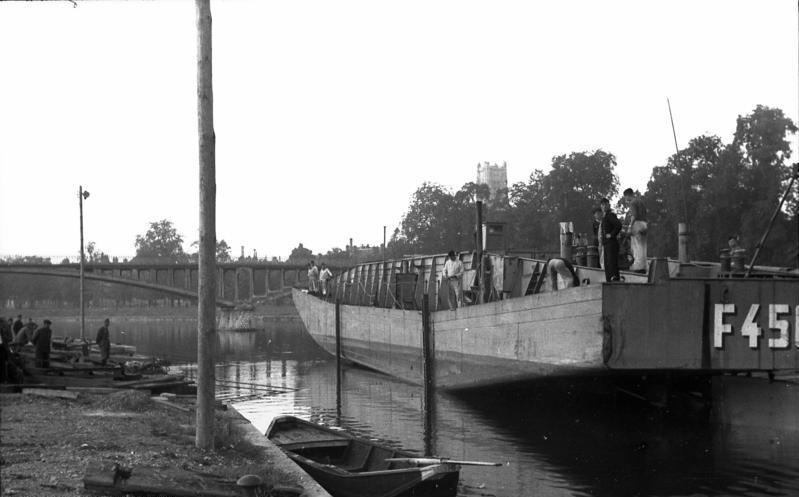
German MFPs like this one were transferred to the Mediterranean to supplement Italian-built landing craft intended for the invasion of Malta

Lacking enough landing craft for an amphibious assault, the Regia Marina secured plans from the German Kriegsmarine to build copies of the Marinefährprahm Type A (MFP) in Italian shipyards. These 220-long-ton (220 t) shallow-draught vessels, were capable of transporting up to 200 equipped infantry, 2–3 medium tanks or an equivalent weight in cargo and could unload onto an open beach via a drop-down bow ramp. Sixty-five of these motozattere (MZs) were completed by July 1942 and about fifty were available for the invasion. Twenty German MFPs were transferred to the Mediterranean via the river Rhone to make up for an expected shortfall of Italian-built landing craft.

German-operated landing craft were sent to Italy via rail for the invasion, including twelve Siebel ferries (catamaran rafts powered by automobile engines driving water screws and armed with 88 mm and 20 mm flak guns), six Type 39 Pionierlandungsboote (carrying 20 long tons (20 t) of cargo, two light vehicles or 45 infantry, unloaded via clamshell doors at the bow), six Type 40 Pionierlandungsboote (a larger version of the Type 39, carrying 40 long tons (41 t) of cargo, three or four light vehicles or 80–90 fully equipped infantry), a company of eighty-one Sturmboote (Type 39 Stormboats, small plywood boats carrying up to six infantrymen and powered by 30 outboard motors) plus an assortment of large inflatable rafts (carrying 25 troops each). Some rafts were powered by outboard motors and others had to be rowed.

The Italians assembled a collection of other naval craft to transport the amphibious forces. These included two former Strait of Messina railway ferries (converted to carry four to eight tanks each); ten passenger ships (800–1,400 men each), six former passenger ferries (400 men each), six cargo ships (3,000 long tons (3,000 t) of supplies each), 30 ex-trawlers (300 men each); five converted minelayers (500 men each) and 74 assorted motorboats (30–75 men each). The Italians also requested the use of 200 additional German Sturmboote to quickly transfer men from ship to shore. The Italian landing flotilla and the supporting ships formed the Special Naval Force (Forza Navale Speciale Admiral Vittorio Tur).

Specialised landing equipment for Herkules included the Seeschlange (Sea Snake), a floating ship-to-shore bridge originally developed by the German Army for Operation Sea Lion. It was formed from a series of joined modules that could be towed into place and act as a temporary jetty. Moored ships could then unload their cargo either directly onto the "roadway" or lower it down onto the Seeschlange via their cranes. The Seeschlange had been tested by the Army Training Unit at Le Havre in the fall of 1941 and was easily transportable by rail.

=== Naval escort ===
The Regia Marina had to protect the invasion convoys from attacks by the British Mediterranean Fleet and provide gunfire support during the landings. The force assigned to accomplish this included four battleships (Littorio, Vittorio Veneto, Duilio, and Andrea Doria), four heavy cruisers, eight light cruisers and 21 destroyers. These ships would assemble and sortie from the ports of Messina, Reggio Calabria, Augusta and Cagliari. The two older Andrea Doria-class battleships would carry approximately 200 rounds each for shore bombardment. Italian and German submarines were to scout for and intercept British naval forces attempting to interfere with the seaborne landings. One submarine was to be stationed midway between Sicily and Malta, to act as a guide beacon for the transport aircraft on their way to and from the drop zones.

The Italians were confident they could defeat any daylight incursions by the Mediterranean Fleet, especially given the Luftwaffe's ability to dominate the daytime skies, but there were concerns the Italian fleet would face serious difficulties if the British attacked at night. Lacking ship-borne radar and having neglected night-fighting training and equipment, the Regia Marina had been defeated at the Battle of Cape Matapan in March 1941. A similar encounter off Malta might wreak havoc on the slow-moving Axis invasion convoys, leaving the airborne forces cut off and imperilling Axis chances of taking the island.

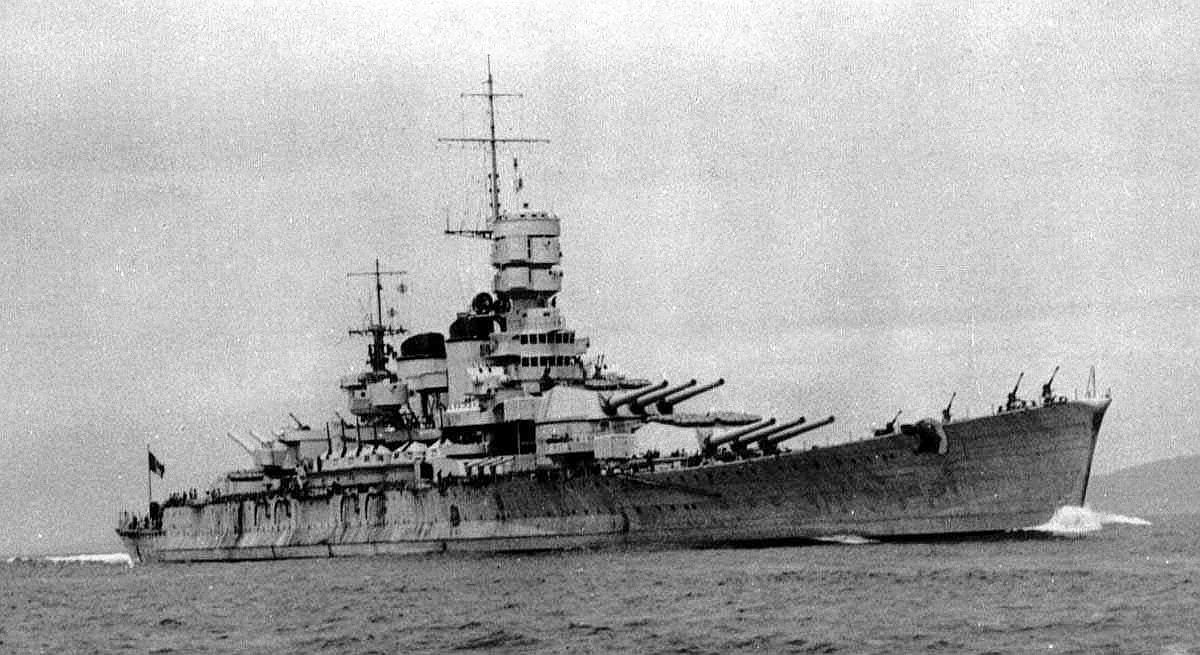
Italian Littorio-class battleship Roma (Regia Marina, 1940)

The Regia Marina had made some efforts to rectify this situation by equipping the battleship Littorio with an experimental E.C.-3/bis Gufo (Owl) radar apparatus in August 1941, but the unit was considered unreliable (not until September 1942 did Littorio receive a standardised production-version Gufo with better performance; this set could detect surface ships at a range of 17 nmi (20 mi; 31 km) and aircraft out to a range of 45 nmi (83 km; 52 mi)). In September 1941, while awaiting production of Italian-made radar units in quantity, the Regia Marina requested from the Kriegsmarine a FuMO 24/40 G DeTe unit for the new destroyer, Legionario (under construction). DeTe units could detect surface ships up to 14 nmi (16 mi; 26 km) away. By March 1942, the set had been delivered and installed and a small group of Italian ratings had been trained in Germany on its use. Operational testing began that spring and by May, the fleet commander Vice-Admiral Angelo Iachino had submitted a report praising its performance.

== Maltese defences ==
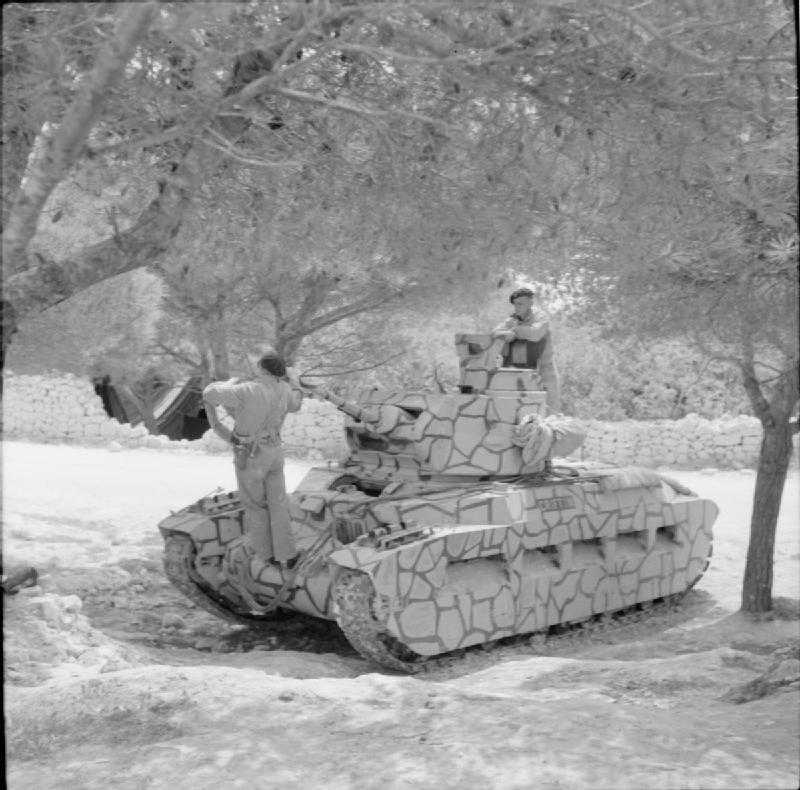
A British Matilda II Infantry Tank on Malta in May 1942.

In 1942 the garrison of Malta consisted of 15 infantry battalions (11 Commonwealth, 4 Maltese) organised into four brigades totalling 26,000 men. Tank support was provided by the 1st Independent Troop of the Royal Tank Regiment, disembarked in November 1940, which was initially equipped with four Matilda II Infantry Tanks, armed with 2-pounder (40 mm) guns, and two Vickers Mk.VIC light tanks, armed with two machine guns (part of detachments from the 7th Royal Tank Regiment and the 3rd The King's Own Hussars). These were reinforced in January 1942 by four Cruiser Mk I and three Cruiser Mk IV tanks and a Vickers Mk.VIC light tank, with the cruisers armed with 2-pounder (40 mm) guns (part of a detachment from the 6th Royal Tank Regiment).

Artillery support came from the 12th Field Regiment, Royal Artillery with twenty-four 25-pounder [3.45 in (88 mm)] field guns, capable of providing fire support out to a range of 6.8 mi (11 km) and covering most of the island while remaining in protected static positions. Malta's fixed defences included nineteen heavy coastal guns (varying in size from 12-inch to 16-inch, although these Victorian era weapons were all decommissioned), 130 smaller coastal guns (6-pounder to 9.2-inch) and 112 heavy and 144 light anti-aircraft guns.

The smaller coastal guns comprised
[Data in this section taken from Hogg (2002)]

- 10 × BL 6 in (150 mm) Mk XXIV, on Mounting, 6 in (150 mm) Mk 5 or 6
- 7 × BL 9.2 in (230 mm) gun Mk X, on Mounting Mk 7
- QF 4.5 in (110 mm) gun Mk II, on Mounting Mk I
- 18 × QF 6 pounder 10 cwt gun (9 × 2)
- ~30 × Ordnance QF 18 pounder

== Aftermath ==
A date near mid-July 1942 was set for the invasion, partly to allow time to bring troops from other front line positions. Field Marshal Erwin Rommel supported the Malta plan and asked Hitler for command of the invasion forces. His reasons for supporting an invasion were to hinder the Allied troops fighting in Africa, as well as to remove the threat to the convoys heading to Italian-German forces with supplies, oil and men, all of which they lacked. He prioritised the attack to such an extent that he was willing to move units from his front for the attack. The head of the Luftwaffe, Hermann Göring, opposed the invasion, fearing it would turn into another near-disaster for his paratroops, as had happened in the airborne assault on Crete. Generalfeldmarschall Albert Kesselring tirelessly promoted Unternehmen Herkules but even he was eventually dissuaded when it became apparent that too many air and ground units had been siphoned off to support the Axis drive into Egypt, diminishing any chance of success. With Hitler lacking faith in the parachute divisions after Crete and in the ability of the Italian navy to protect the invasion fleet from British naval attacks, the plan was cancelled.

== Bibliography ==
- Bekker, Cajus (1975). The Luftwaffe War Diaries. Ballantine Books. ISBN 978-0-306-80604-9.
- Boog, H.; Rahn, W.; Stumpf, R.; Wegner, B. (2001). Osers, E. (ed.). The Global War: Widening of the Conflict into a World War and the Shift of the Initiative 1941–1943. Germany and the Second World War. Vol. VI. Translated by Osers, E.; Brownjohn, J.; Crampton, P.; Willmott, L. (Eng. trans. Clarendon Press, Oxford ed.). Potsdam: Militärgeschichtliches Forschungsamt (Research Institute for Military History). ISBN 0-19-822888-0.
  - Stumpf, R. "Part V, The War in the Mediterranean Area 1942–1943: Operations in North Africa and the Central Mediterranean. 2. The Battle of Malta (December 1941–21 May 1942)". In Boog et al. (2001).
- Burtt, John (2023). Operation C3: Hitler's Plan to Invade Malta 1942. Yorkshire, UK: Pen & Sword Books Ltd. ISBN 978-1-39906-576-4.
- Green, William (1979). Warplanes of the Third Reich. New York: Doubleday. ISBN 978-0-356-02382-3.
- Greene, Jack; Massignani, Alessandro (1998). The Naval War in the Mediterranean 1940–1943. Chatham Publishing. ISBN 978-1-86176-057-9.
- Hogg, Ian (2002). British & American Artillery of World War Two (rev. ed.). Greenhill Books. ISBN 978-1-85367-478-5.
- Marcon, Tullio (1998). I Muli del Mare [The Sea Mules]. Storia militare. Parma: Albertelli. ISBN 978-88-87372-02-1.
- Ritgen, Helmut (1995). The Western Front 1944: Memoirs of a Panzer Lehr Officer. J.J. Fedorowicz Publishing. ISBN 978-0-921991-28-1.
- Schenk, Peter (1990). Invasion of England 1940: The Planning of Operation Sealion. Conway Maritime Press. ISBN 0-85177-548-9.
