= Playdate =

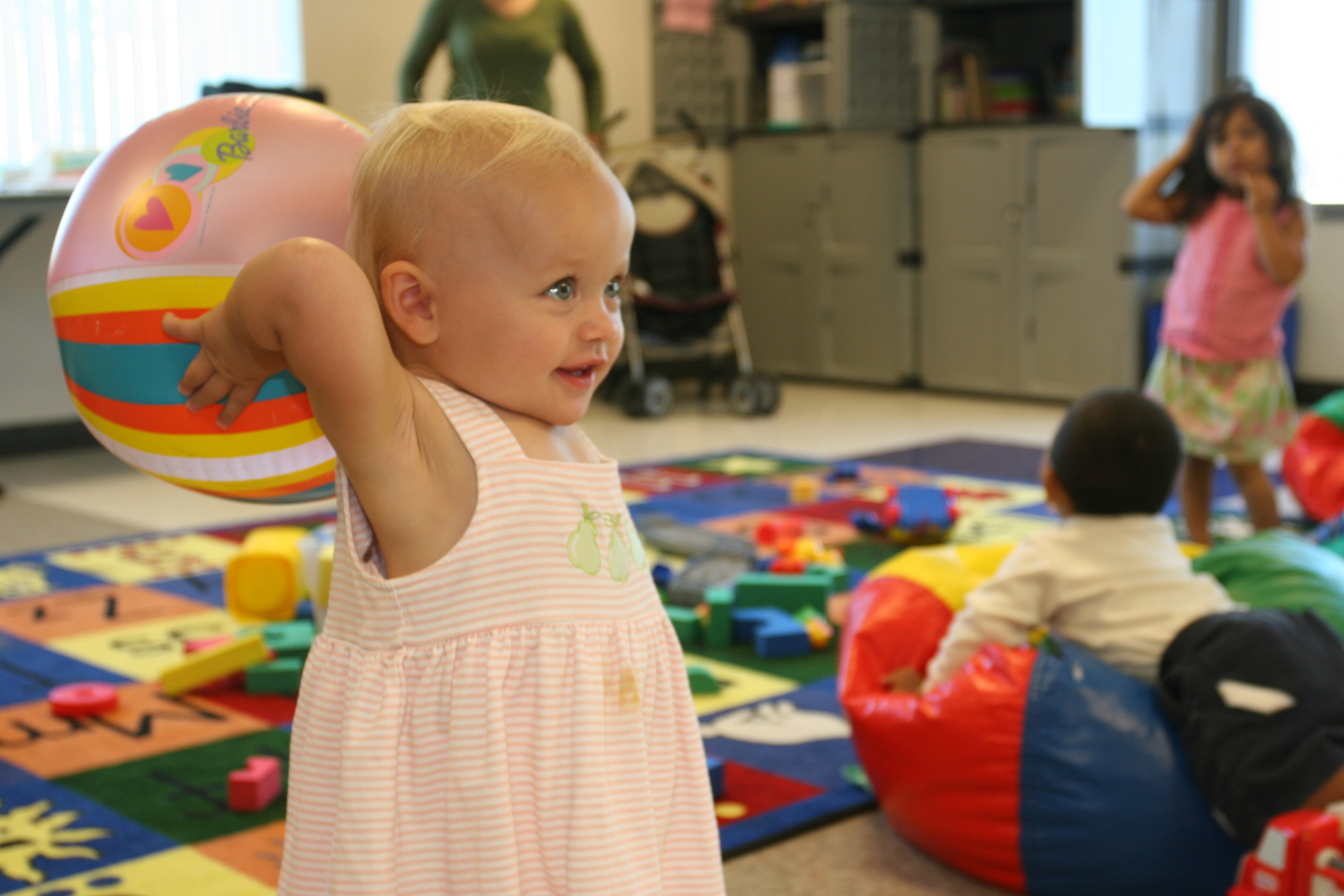
Children playing while adults watch from behind

A play date or playdate is an arranged appointment for children to get together to play in a period of time, like for instance for a few hours.

Play dates have become more common after the 2000s as parents’ work hours have become longer, and public media have recommended that children of the same age should play together. Play dates have also been associated with child-friendly events offered by museums, parks and playgrounds.

The goal of a play date is to give children the opportunity of free movement and collaboration in a less structured environment than other planned activities can offer. Play dates differ from organized activities such as sports, school trips, et cetera, exactly because they are not structured after habitual patterns.

Play dates have increasingly become part of traditional and pop-cultural lifestyle in USA, and represents a kind of "break" in childrens everyday life. Most parents prefer their children to play with friends of similar age during these hours, either in pairs or in small groups. When the children are very small it is common that a parent is present at the play date, and uses the time to get to know the other parents.
