= Shantou (disambiguation) =

Shantou (汕头) is a Prefecture-level city in Guangdong Province, China.

Shantou may also refer to:

- Shantou, Si County (山头镇), a township-level division in Anhui Province.
- Shantou (horse), a racehorse
