= Asante (name) =

Asante is both an Ashanti surname and a masculine Ashanti given name. Notable people with the Ashanti name include:

== As a surname ==
- Akwasi Asante (born 1992), Dutch footballer
- Amma Asante (born 1969), British film director and producer
- Amma Asante (politician) (born 1972), Dutch politician
- Anita Asante (born 1985), English footballer
- David Asante (1834–1892), Akan Basel missionary, linguist, and educator
- Ernest Asante (born 1988), Ghanaian footballer
- Eugene Asante (born 2001), American football player
- Gyearbuor Asante (1941–2000), Ghanaian actor
- K. B. Asante (1924–2018), Ghanaian diplomat
- Kofi Asante Ofori-Atta (1912–1978), Ghanaian politician
- Kyle Asante (born 1991), English footballer
- Larry Asante (born 1988), American football player
- Molefi Kete Asante (born 1942), American writer, scholar, historian, and philosopher
- M. K. Asante Jr. (born 1982), American writer, filmmaker, and professor
- Okyerema Asante, Ghanaian drummer
- Raymond Asante (born 2004), Ghanaian footballer
- Sarah Asante (born 1975), Ghanaian commissioner and executive producer, BBC and UKTV
- Shaheera Asante (born 1966), British radio and television presenter
- Solomon Asante (born 1990), Ghanaian footballer
- Uriah Asante (1992–2016), Ghanaian footballer
- Yaw Asante (born 1991), Ghanaian footballer

== As a given name ==
- Asante Blackk (born 2001), American actor
- Asante Cleveland (born 1992), American football player
- Asante Gullit Okyere (born 1988), Italian football player
- Asante Samuel (born 1981), American football player
- Asante Samuel Jr. (born 1999), American football player
