= Shantha Dange =

Sri Lankan cricketer (born 1974)

Shantha Dange (born 27 October 1974) was a Sri Lankan cricketer. He was a right-handed batsman and right-arm off-break bowler who played for Kandy. He was born in Kandy.

Dange made a single first-class appearance for the side, during the 2001–02 season, against Sebastianites. He failed to score a run in either innings in which he batted.

In 23 overs of bowling, he conceded 55 runs without taking a wicket.
