= No.101-class landing ship =

Imperial Japanese Navy ship class (1944–1955)

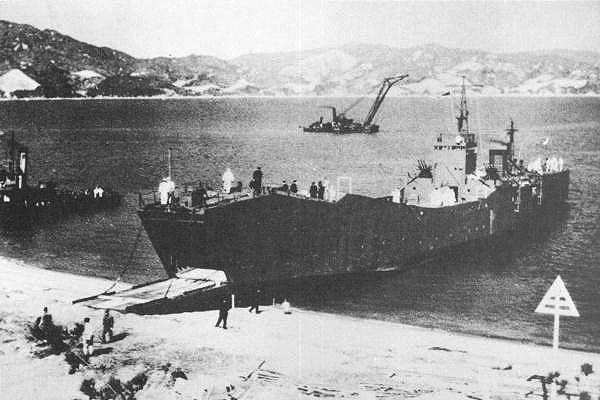
- No.149 on 2 March 1944 at Kurahashijima Island.

Class overview
- Name: No.101-class landing ship; No.103-class landing ship
- Builders: Sasebo Naval Arsenal; Hitachi Zōsen Corporation; Kawanami Kōgyō Corporation; Ōsaka Zōsen Corporation
- Operators: Imperial Japanese Navy; Imperial Japanese Army; Republic of China Navy; Soviet Navy
- Preceded by: SS-class
- Built: 1943–1945
- In commission: 1944–1955
- Planned: 103
- Completed: 69 (Navy: 49, Army: 20)
- Cancelled: 32
- Lost: 41 (Navy: 40, Army: 1)
- Retired: 30 (Navy: 9, Army: 19)

General characteristics No.101 class
- Type: Landing Ship, Tank
- Displacement: 950 long tons (965 t) standard; 1,010 long tons (1,026 t) trial
- Length: 80.50 m (264 ft 1 in) overall; 75.50 m (247 ft 8 in) waterline
- Beam: 9.10 m (29 ft 10 in)
- Draught: 2.89 m (9 ft 6 in)
- Draft: 5.65 m (18 ft 6 in)
- Propulsion: 3 × intermediate diesels; 3 shafts, 1,200 bhp
- Speed: 13.4 knots (15.4 mph; 24.8 km/h)
- Range: 3,000 nmi (5,600 km) at 13.4 kn (15.4 mph; 24.8 km/h)
- Capacity: 320 troops, 26 tons freight and; Example 1: 13 × Type 95 Ha-Go; Example 2: 9 × Type 97 Chi-Ha; Example 3: 7 × Type 2 Ka-Mi; Example 4: 5 × Type 3 Ka-Chi; Example 5: 250 tons freight
- Complement: 90
- Armament: No.101, March 1944; 1 × 76.2 mm (3.00 in) L/40 AA gun; 6 × Type 96 25 mm AA guns; 6 × depth charges

General characteristics No.103 class
- Type: Landing Ship, Tank
- Displacement: 870 long tons (884 t) standard; 1,020 long tons (1,036 t) trial
- Length: 80.50 m (264 ft 1 in) overall; 75.00 m (246 ft 1 in) waterline
- Beam: 9.10 m (29 ft 10 in)
- Draught: 2.94 m (9 ft 8 in)
- Draft: 5.65 m (18 ft 6 in)
- Propulsion: 1 × Kampon geared turbine; 2 × Kampon water tube boilers; single shaft, 2,500 shp
- Speed: 16.0 knots (18.4 mph; 29.6 km/h)
- Range: Going: 1,000 nmi (1,900 km) at 16 kn (30 km/h; 18 mph); Returning: 1,000 nmi (1,900 km; 1,200 mi) at 14 kn (26 km/h; 16 mph)
- Capacity: 120 troops, 22 tons freight and; Example 1: 13 × Type 95 Ha-Go; Example 2: 9 × Type 97 Chi-Ha; Example 3: 7 × Type 2 Ka-Mi; Example 4: 5 × Type 3 Ka-Chi; Example 5: 220 tons freight; Example 6: approx. 280 troops
- Complement: 100
- Armament: No.104, 20 August 1944; 1 × 76.2 mm (3.00 in) L/40 AA gun; 16 × Type 96 25 mm AA guns; 4 × 13 mm AA guns; 12 × depth charges

The No.101-class landing ships (第百一号型輸送艦, Dai 101 Gō-gata Yusōkan) were a class of amphibious assault ships of the Imperial Japanese Navy (IJN) and Imperial Japanese Army (IJA), serving during and after World War II, similar in principle to the Allies' "Landing Ship, Tanks". The No.101 class ships were powered by diesel engines, while the similar No.103-class landing ships (第百三号型輸送艦, Dai 103 Gō-gata Yusōkan) were powered by a steam turbine engine. The IJN called them 2nd class transporter (二等輸送艦, 2-Tō Yusōkan). The No.103 class included the IJA's SB craft (SB艇, SB-tei) variant. This article handles them collectively.

== Background ==
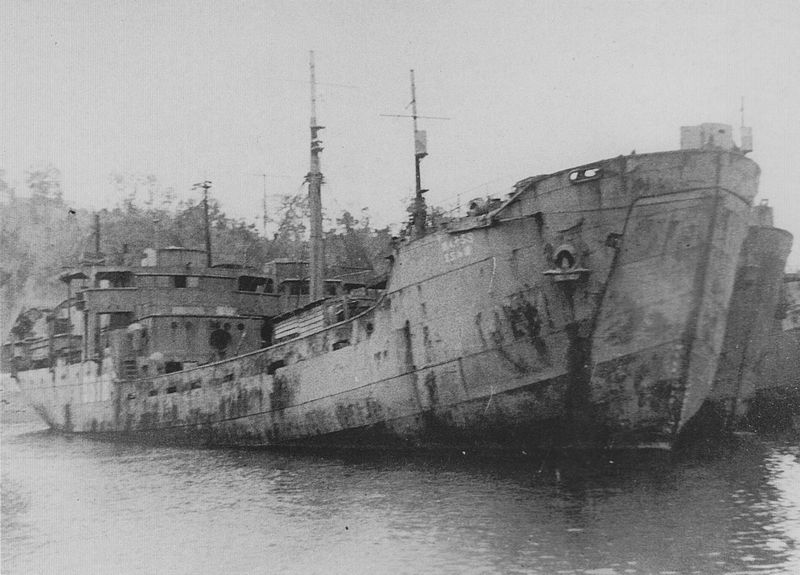
IJA SS craft No.19

- In June 1943, after its defeat in the Guadalcanal Campaign, the IJN realized it needed high-speed military transport vessels, and designed two classes of ship in response. One (the No.1 class) was to be the 1,500-ton mothership of the Daihatsu-class landing craft and Kō-hyōteki-class submarines, the other was to be a 900-ton amphibious assault ship, the No.101 class.
- The IJA already had an amphibious assault ship, the SS-class landing ship. However, the SS craft were not suitable for mass-production, leading to IJA support for the new amphibious assault ships.
- The IJN and IJA therefore cooperated on the production of the new amphibious assault ships with the IJN providing design and shipyards while the IJA offered mineral resources.

== Design ==
- The IJN had obtained information regarding Operation Torch from Germany, including some photographs and sketches of the LCT Mk.V.
- In August 1943, the Navy Technical Department (Kampon) studied these and finished a basic design. It was a scaled-up model of the LCT.
- In September 1943, the Kampon entrusted the detailed design to the Kure Naval Arsenal. The Kure Naval Arsenal completed this within two months, and the No.101 was laid down in November 1943.

== Construction ==
- The Kampon designed a new turbine engine for this class. However, it was not ready in time for the first 6 vessels. The Kampon therefore installed the wartime standard diesel engine in the first 6 vessels. The IJN called them No.101 class or SB (D). Turbine engines were available in time for the remaining production, which the IJN designated the No.103 class or SB (T). Completed vessels were split between the IJN and IJA.
- The IJA received 32 vessels from the No.103 class, however the IJA had difficulties with the steam turbines engine and returned 10 vessels to the IJN.
- Several No.103 and SB class vessels were converted to use coal-fired boilers in January 1945. Detailed construction records do not exist, but photographic evidence confirms the conversion of No.147, SB No.101 and SB No.108 with the presence of a tall funnel.

== Navy service ==
- Most of the Navy vessels took part in the Battle of Leyte, where 18 of them were lost. Most, however, succeeded in landing their tanks and troops.
- Only 9 vessels survived the war.

== Army service ==
- As of 2009 a detailed record of the vessels in the Army service is not known to exist in Japan.
- The armaments were not standardized.
- The IJA let ten SB craft participate in the Philippines Campaign. Their actions were limited to the Luzon northern coast, Taiwan and Ryukyu Islands. The IJA lost only one SB craft.
- After the Philippines Campaign, the SB craft were used only in the Japanese mainland peripheral sea area.

== Ships in classes ==
=== No.101 class ===
Ship	Builder	Laid down	Launched	Completed	Fate
No.101	Ōsaka Zōsen	01-12-1943	25-01-1944	08-03-1944	Sunk by aircraft at Ormoc Bay, 28-10-1944.
No.102	Ōsaka Zōsen	15-12-1943	08-02-1944	15-03-1944	Sunk by aircraft at west of Negros, 26-10-1944.
No.127	Kawanami Kōgyō	21-10-1943	13-01-1944	28-02-1944	Sunk by aircraft off Ticao Island, 25-09-1944.
No.128	Kawanami Kōgyō	10-11-1943	10-02-1944	18-03-1944	Sunk by aircraft off Morotai, 04-06-1944.
No.149	Hitachi Zōsen	01-11-1943	25-12-1943	20-02-1944	Converted to miscellaneous service ship (traffic boat) and renamed Kuroshio No. 2 (第二黒潮,, Dai 2 Kuroshio) on 10-02-1945. Sunk by USN submarine off Sumatra on 01-06-1945.
No.150	Hitachi Zōsen	28-12-1943	27-01-1944	10-03-1944	Sunk by aircraft off Palau, 27-07-1944.

=== No.103 class ===
Ship	Builder	Laid down	Launched	Completed	Fate
No.103	Ōsaka Zōsen	28-01-1944	09-03-1944	01-05-1944	Sunk by aircraft off Iwo Jima, 04-07-1944.
No.104	Ōsaka Zōsen	12-02-1944	25-03-1944	25-05-1944	Sunk by aircraft west of Luzon, 15-12-1944.
No.105	Ōsaka Zōsen	12-03-1944	12-04-1944	15-06-1944	Sunk by USS Trepang south of Omaezaki, 11-10-1944
No.106	Ōsaka Zōsen	28-03-1944	25-04-1944	30-06-1944	Completed as Army SB No.120 at first. Sunk by aircraft at Lingayen Gulf, 15-12-1944.
No.107	Ōsaka Zōsen	15-04-1944	21-05-1944	20-07-1944	Completed as Army SB No.123 at first. Sunk by USN destroyer west of Haha-jima, 05-01-1945.
No.108	Ōsaka Zōsen	28-04-1944	25-05-1944	31-07-1944	Completed as Army SB No.125 at first. Decommissioned 03-05-1947. Surrendered to United Kingdom at Singapore, 17-10-1947.
No.109	Ōsaka Zōsen			15-08-1944	Transferred to the Army, SB craft.
No.110	Ōsaka Zōsen	28-05-1944	23-06-1944	05-09-1944	Completed as Army SB craft at first. Decommissioned 15-09-1945. Surrendered to United Kingdom at Singapore, 17-10-1947.
No.111	Ōsaka Zōsen	13-06-1944	10-07-1944	15-09-1944	Completed as Army SB craft at first. Sunk by aircraft at Masbate, 24-11-1944.
No.112	Ōsaka Zōsen	26-06-1944	22-07-1944	05-10-1944	Completed as Army SB craft at first. Sunk by aircraft west of Luzon, 07-01-1945.
No.113	Ōsaka Zōsen	13-07-1944	08-08-1944	15-10-1944	Completed as Army SB craft at first. Sunk by aircraft west of Luzon, 25-11-1944.
No.114	Ōsaka Zōsen	25-07-1944	20-08-1944	30-10-1944	Completed as Army SB craft at first. Sunk by aircraft off Taiwan, 17-02-1945.
No.115	Ōsaka Zōsen	12-08-1944	07-09-1944	13-11-1944	Completed as Army SB craft at first. Sunk by aircraft north of Luzon, 02-02-1945.
No.116	Ōsaka Zōsen			24-11-1944	Transferred to the Army, and renamed SB No.103.
No.117	Ōsaka Zōsen			22-12-1944	Transferred to the Army, SB craft.
No.118	Ōsaka Zōsen			30-12-1944	Transferred to the Army, SB craft.
No.119	Ōsaka Zōsen			16-01-1945	Transferred to the Army, SB craft.
No.120	Ōsaka Zōsen			05-02-1945	Transferred to the Army, SB craft.
No.121	Ōsaka Zōsen			20-02-1945	Transferred to the Army, SB craft.
No.122	Ōsaka Zōsen			22-03-1945	Transferred to the Army, SB craft.
No.123	Ōsaka Zōsen			22-03-1945	Transferred to the Army, SB craft.
No.124	Ōsaka Zōsen			08-05-1945	Transferred to the Army, SB craft.
No.125	Ōsaka Zōsen				Transferred to the Army, and renamed SB No.127. Not completed until the end of war.
No.126	Ōsaka Zōsen				Transferred to the Army, and renamed SB No.128. Not completed until the end of war.
No.129	Kawanami Kōgyō	10-12-1943	25-02-1944	12-05-1944	Sunk by USS Cod in the Banda Sea, 14-08-1944.
No.130	Kawanami Kōgyō	20-01-1944	05-04-1944	03-06-1944	Sunk by aircraft off Iwo Jima, 04-07-1944.
No.131	Kawanami Kōgyō	05-02-1944	23-04-1944	24-06-1944	Converted to miscellaneous service ship (traffic boat) and renamed Kuroshio No. 1 (第一黒潮,, Dai 1 Kuroshio) on 10-02-1945. Sunk by USN submarine in the Strait of Malacca on 27-07-1945.
No.132	Kawanami Kōgyō	25-02-1944	05-05-1944	28-06-1944	Sunk by USN destroyer at Iwo Jima, 27-12-1944.
No.133	Sasebo Naval Arsenal	10-04-1944	07-06-1944	04-07-1944	Sunk by aircraft off Iwo Jima, 04-08-1944.
No.134	Kawanami Kōgyō	10-04-1944	15-06-1944	15-07-1945	Scuttled by stormy weather at Iwo Jima, 04-10-1944.
No.135	Kawanami Kōgyō	28-04-1944	26-06-1944	25-07-1944	Sunk by aircraft at west coast of Luzon, 18-10-1944.
No.136	Kawanami Kōgyō	10-05-1944	15-07-1944	20-08-1944	Sunk by aircraft at west coast of Luzon, 18-10-1944.
No.137	Kawanami Kōgyō	01-06-1944	20-07-1944	28-08-1944	Decommissioned 05-10-1945. Surrendered to Soviet Union at Nakhodka, 03-10-1947.
No.138	Kawanami Kōgyō	18-06-1944	03-08-1944	04-09-1944	Sunk by USS Kingfish off Iwo Jima, 26-10-1944.
No.139	Kawanami Kōgyō	05-07-1944	18-08-1944	25-09-1944	Sunk by aircraft at west coast of Luzon, 12-11-1944.
No.140	Sasebo Naval Arsenal	26-07-1944	16-09-1944	14-10-1944	Sunk by aircraft at Saigon, 13-01-1945.
No.141	Sasebo Naval Arsenal	29-07-1944	16-09-1944	19-10-1944	Sunk by aircraft at Masbate, 24-11-1944.
No.142	Kawanami Kōgyō	01-08-1944	20-09-1944	02-11-1944	Sunk by aircraft at west coast of Luzon, 25-11-1944.
No.143	Kawanami Kōgyō	14-08-1944	03-10-1944	25-11-1944	Sunk by aircraft at Penghu, 26-03-1945.
No.144	Kawanami Kōgyō	20-08-1944	20-10-1944	01-12-1944	Decommissioned 05-10-1945, later scrapped.
No.145	Kawanami Kōgyō	05-09-1944	15-11-1944	16-12-1944	Sunk by USN aircraft at Amami Ōshima, 02-04-1945.
No.146	Kawanami Kōgyō	24-09-1944	30-11-1944	30-12-1944	Sunk by USS Trepang south of Gotō Islands, 28-04-1945.
No.147	Kawanami Kōgyō	06-10-1944	15-12-1944	25-01-1945	Decommissioned 15-09-1945. Surrendered to United States at Yokosuka, 13-11-1947. Scrapped 31-03-1948.
No.148	Kawanami Kōgyō			31-01-1945	Transferred to the Army, and renamed SB No.113.
No.151	Hitachi Zōsen	29-01-1944	27-02-1944	23-04-1944	Sunk by USS Besugo north of Palawan, 23-11-1944.
No.152	Hitachi Zōsen	29-02-1944	24-03-1944	25-05-1944	Sunk by aircraft at Iwo Jima, 04-08-1944.
No.153	Hitachi Zōsen	15-02-1944	08-04-1944	15-06-1944	Decommissioned 30-11-1945. Scrapped 1948.
No.154	Hitachi Zōsen	26-03-1944	23-04-1944	05-07-1944	Completed as Army SB craft at first. Sunk by USN destroyer at Iwo Jima, 05-01-1945.
No.155	Hitachi Zōsen			19-07-1944	Transferred to the Army, SB craft.
No.156	Hitachi Zōsen			05-08-1944	Transferred to the Army, SB craft.
No.157	Hitachi Zōsen	12-05-1944	06-09-1944	19-08-1944	Sunk by USN destroyer at Iwo Jima, 24-12-1944.
No.158	Hitachi Zōsen	24-05-1944	23-06-1944	04-09-1944	Sunk by aircraft at Naha, 10-10-1944.
No.159	Hitachi Zōsen	10-06-1944	08-07-1944	16-09-1944	Sunk by a bombardment of US Army tanks and artillery at Ormoc Bay, 12-12-1944.
No.160	Hitachi Zōsen	01-07-1944	08-08-1944	30-09-1944	Sunk by aircraft at Masbate, 24-11-1944.
No.161	Hitachi Zōsen	09-07-1944	22-08-1944	14-10-1944	Sunk by aircraft at west coast of Luzon, 25-11-1944.
No.162	Hitachi Zōsen			23-10-1944	Transferred to the Army, and renamed SB No.101. Scrapped April 1948.
No.163	Hitachi Zōsen			31-10-1944	Transferred to the Army, and renamed SB No.102.
No.164	Ōsaka Zōsen	11-04-1945			Construction stopped; later scrapped.
No.165	Ōsaka Zōsen	28-04-1945			Construction stopped; later scrapped.
6 vessels					They were cancelled before being named.
No.172	Kawanami Kōgyō	24-11-1944	27-01-1945	10-03-1945	Decommissioned 15-09-1945. Surrendered to Republic of China at Qingdao, 03-10-1947. Renamed Lui Shan (AP-308). Decommissioned 1955.
No.173	Kawanami Kōgyō	08-12-1944	15-02-1945	01-04-1945	Sunk by aircraft at Ryukyu Islands, 22-05-1945.
No.174	Kawanami Kōgyō	03-01-1945	15-03-1945	14-07-1945	Decommissioned 20-11-1945; scrapped in 1948.
No.175	Kawanami Kōgyō	02-02-1945	11-04-1945		Construction stopped 11-04-1945. Sunk by typhoon 15-09-1945; scrapped on 01-10-1948.
No.176	Kawanami Kōgyō	22-02-1945	25-06-1945		Construction stopped 25-06-1945; later scrapped.
7 vessels					They were cancelled before being named.
No.184	Hitachi Zōsen			30-11-1944	Transferred to the Army, SB craft.
No.185	Hitachi Zōsen			10-12-1944	Transferred to the Army, SB craft.
No.186	Hitachi Zōsen			24-12-1944	Transferred to the Army, SB craft.
No.187	Hitachi Zōsen			13-01-1945	Transferred to the Army, and renamed SB No.114. Scrapped May 1948.
No.188	Hitachi Zōsen			29-01-1945	Transferred to the Army, SB craft.
15 vessels					Cancelled before being named.

== Photos ==
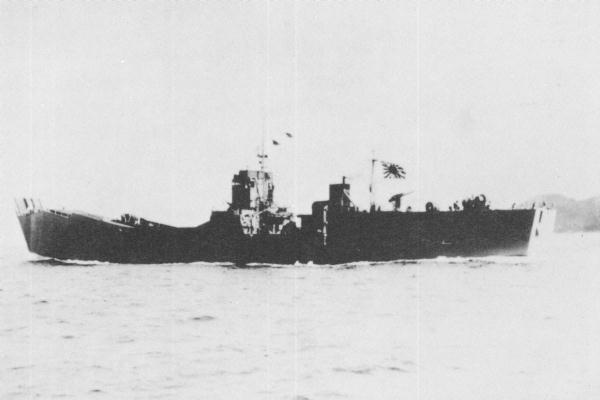
No.149 on 16 February 1944 at Yugeshima Island.

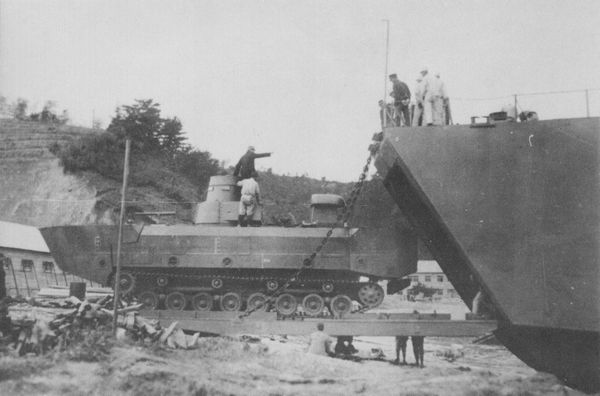
Type 3 Ka-Chi departure from No.149 on 29 February 1944 at Nasakejima Island.

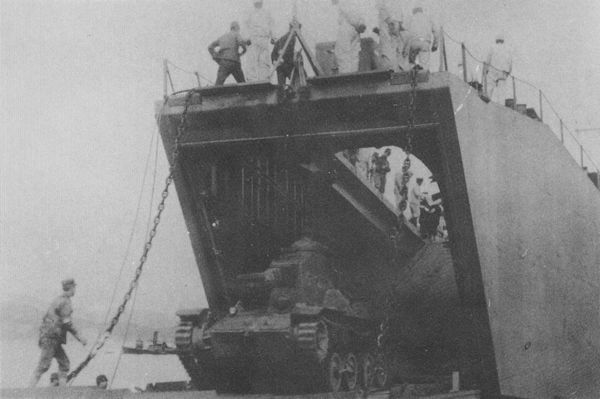
Type 95 Ha-Gō departure from No.149 on 27 February 1944 at Nasakejima Island.

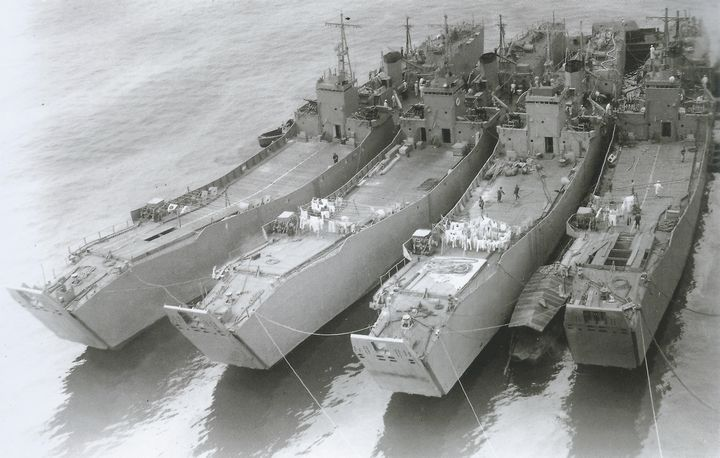
(left to right) No.150, No.101, No.127 and No.149 on 13 March 1944 at Kure Naval Arsenal.

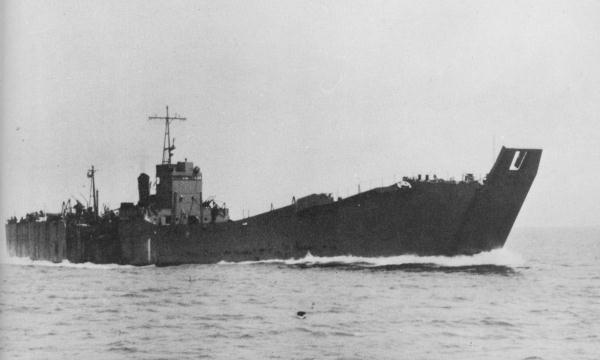
No.151 on 20 April 1944 at Yugeshima Island.

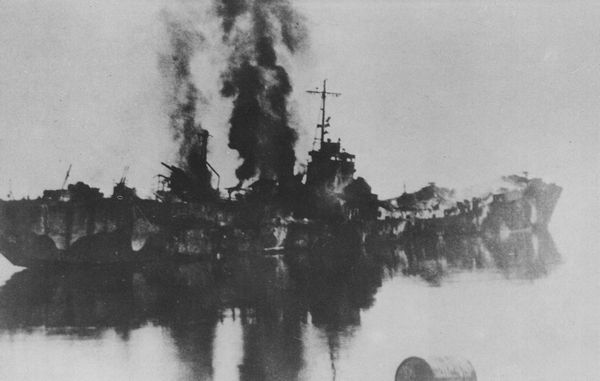
No.159 on 12 December 1944 at Ormoc Bay.

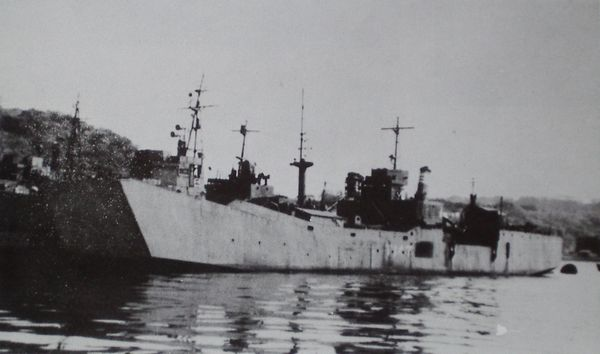
No.147 w/ coal-fired boilers on 16 December 1946 at Yokosuka Naval Base.

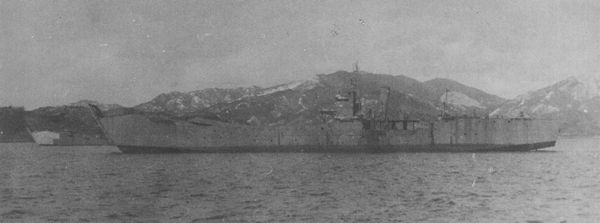
IJA SB No. 101 on 17 February 1947 at Hiroshima Bay.

== See also ==
- Landing Ship, Tank
- Landing Ship Medium
- Landing craft tank
- Landing Craft Utility
- SS-class landing ship
- Daihatsu-class landing craft

== Bibliography ==
- "Rekishi Gunzō"., History of the Pacific War Vol. 51, "The truth histories of the Imperial Japanese Vessels Part.2", Gakken (Japan), 2005, ISBN 4-05-604083-4.
- Rekishi Gunzō, History of the Pacific War Vol. 62, "Ships of the Imperial Japanese Forces", Gakken (Japan), January 2008, ISBN 978-4-05-605008-0
- The Maru Special, Japanese Naval Vessels No. 50, "Japanese minesweepers and landing ships", Ushio Shobō (Japan), 1981.
- Ships of the World, Special issue Vol. 47, "Auxiliary Vessels of the Imperial Japanese Navy", "Kaijinsha"., (Japan), 1997.
- Shizuo Fukui, Japanese Naval Vessels Survived, "Their post-war activities and final disposition", Shuppan Kyodosha (Japan), 1961.
- Shizuo Fukui, FUKUI SHIZUO COLLECTION "Japanese Naval Vessels 1869–1945", KK Bestsellers (Japan), 1994.
