= Dewi Sant =

Dewi Sant (Welsh) may refer to:

- Saint David
  - Saint David (disambiguation) for other Saint Davids and things named therefore
- Dewi Sant, an oratorio by Arwel Hughes
- Dewi Sant, a work for SATB chorus and orchestra by Karl Jenkins (1999, 30 minutes)
- Dewi Sant Hospital in Pontypridd, Wales
