= Shanta (given name) =

Shanta is a unisex given name. Notable people with the name include:

== Women ==
- Shanta Apte (1916–1964), Indian singer and actress
- Shanta Chaudhary, Nepalese social reformer and politician
- Shanta Chhetri (born 1956), Indian politician
- Shanta Dutta, Indian medical researcher
- Shanta Dhananjayan (born 1943), Indian dancer, half of the Indian dance duo the Dhananjayans
- Shanta Gandhi (1917–2002), Indian theatre director
- Shanta Ghosh (born 1975), German retired sprinter
- Shanta Gokhale (born 1939), Indian writer
- Shanta Hublikar (1914–1992), Indian actress and singer
- Shanta Islam, Bangladeshi actress, anchor, and director Najma Haque (1985–present)
- Shanta Meena, Indian politician elected in 2024
- Shanta Pathak (1927–2010), British businesswoman
- Shanta Jean Persaud, British diabetes researcher and academic
- Shanta Rao (1930–2007), Indian dancer
- Shanta S. Rao (1923–1979), Indian medical researcher
- Shanta Shelke (1922–2002), Indian poet
- V. Shanta (1927–2021), Indian oncologist
- Shanta Vasisht (born c. 1926), Indian politician

== Men ==
- Shanta Devarajan, Indian economist and academic
- Shanta Kumar (born 1934), Indian politician
- Shanta Das Manandhar (1934–2023), Nepalese pioneering children's literature writer

== See also ==
- Shantha, a given name and surname
