= Shanti Wintergate =

Canadian-American singer

- Origin: Hollywood, California
- Genres: Rock, kindie rock, etc.
- Occupations: Singer, songwriter, musician, actor and author
- Instruments: Guitar, vocals
- Years active: 2000s–present
- Label: Fun Fun Records
- Member of: Play Date
- Website: ShantiWintergate.com

Shanti Wintergate is a Canadian/American singer, songwriter, musician, actor and author. She has released two solo albums, and performed nationally at venues such as the Vans Warped Tour. In 2007, Wintergate co-authored a children's book titled I Went for a Walk. She continues to collaborate with other artists and is a founding member of the children's music project Play Date. In 2014 her book I Went for a Walk won the Creative Child's 2014 Preferred Choice Award.

== Early life ==
Wintergate was born in Hollywood, California to artist/musician parents from Victoria, B.C., and was raised in the mountains of Idaho. She attended the University of Victoria, and studied acting. Wintergate started writing music and playing guitar as a teenager, performing at local folk festivals and other venues. As a teenager, she traveled through India with a guitar, performing her own material at small venues. Further influenced by genres such as punk rock and rock during her travels, she later moved to Los Angeles.

== Career ==
=== Early music and acting ===
Wintergate's debut solo album This Moment was self-released on her own imprint Allone Records in 2003. This led to performances at the Vans Warped Tour from 2006 to 2008, and in 2007 memorabilia related to Wintergate was included in the Warped: 12 Years of Music, Mayhem and More exhibit at the Rock and Roll Hall of Fame. She also embarked on a number of US and European tours such the Caballeros Akustika tour and the Vroom Vroom Vespa acoustic tour in 2010 with Kevin Seconds, Kepi Ghouli, and Attonito.

After a couple of years of hiatus and traveling on tour with her husband Greg Attonito, Shanti partnered with Canadian producer Chris Wardman (Blue Peter) and engineer Brad Haehnel to create what would become Stranger Days (2007) and the acoustic version Stranger Days Stripped (2008).

She has appeared as an actress in shows such as CSI:NY, where she played a roller derby girl and suspected killer.

=== I Went for a Walk and collaborations ===
I Went for a Walk is a children's book authored by Wintergate and illustrated by her husband Greg Attonito in 2007. The book was positively reviewed by Brian McConville of Blogcritics, as well as Jackson Ellis for Verbicide Magazine. In 2007 Wintergate and Atonnito toured in locales such as San Francisco doing book readings, also singing the words with guitar. In 2011, Wintergate and Attonito jointly exhibited their art at a month-long show in Seattle, Washington, celebrating their first opening with a mix of acoustic covers and originals from each of their catalogs.

Since her solo albums Wintergate has been involved with a number of collaborations, and she appeared on Attonito's solo debut Natural Disaster in 2011. She has been involved with the "Magic Monday" recording sessions at Noise Alchemy studios in Los Angeles, for example playing guitar on a 2012 session with Billy Manzik.

In 2014, I Went for a Walk won the Creative Child's 2014 Preferred Choice Award. Wintergate is in the lineup "punk rock authors" to be featured in book signings at the It's Not Dead Festival in late 2015, which is put on in California by Kevin Lyman of the Warped tour.

=== Play Date ===
Wintergate and Attonito toured the United States doing readings and singings of their book I Went on a Walk, and upon returning home, began working the book into an album of kindie rock. She is a founding member of the children's music project Play Date with partner and husband, Greg Attonito. Play Date released debut album Imagination on Fun Fun Records in 2012 receiving positive acclaim from NPR's All things Considered The album won a 2014 Parents' Choice Award. In 2013 they played ACL Fest at the kids' stage, and in 2014 they played Lollapalooza.

==== Awards and nominations ====
Year	Award	Nominated work	Category	Result
2014	Creative Child Awards	I Went for a Walk written by Wintergate	Preferred Choice Award	Won
2014	Creative Child Awards	Imagination by Play Date	Seal of Excellence Award	Won
2014	Parent's Choice Awards	Imagination by Play Date	Parents' Choice Award	Won

== Personal life ==
She is married to and often collaborates with Greg Attonito, lead singer of the New Jersey punk-rock band, The Bouncing Souls. Wintergate as of 2010 has a home in Idaho.

== Publishing history ==
- Wintergate, Shanti; Gregory Attonito (2007-09-27). I Went for a Walk. Hollywood Jersey. ISBN 0-9795426-0-X.

== Discography ==
=== Solo credits ===
Albums by Shanti Wintergate
Year	Album title	Release details
2003	This Moment	Released: 2003; Label: Allone Records / Hollywood Jersey; Format: CD, digital
2007	Stranger Days	Released: 2007 / 2008; Label: Hollywood Jersey ('07) / Allone Records ('08); Format: CD, digital, vinyl
2008	Stranger Days Stripped	Released: Oct 1, 2008 / 2009; Label: Allone Records ('08) / Hollywood Jersey ('09); Format: Digital (Oct. 1, '08), CD

EPs by Shanti Wintergate
Year	Title	Label	Release details
2009	Santa Baby EP	Hollywood Jersey	
2010	Blue & Gold EP	Asian Man Records	

Incomplete list of songs by Shanti Wintergate
Year	Title	Album	Release details
2008	"Michel Gondry, I Want To Do Your Laundry"		Hollywood Jersey
2008	"Blizzard" (acoustic)		XO/Shanti
2011	"Love Today"		Noise Alchemy / Hollywood Jersey
2012	"Jeepster" (as Greg and Shanti)	T.Rex Trax	LawLess Records (7" Vinyl)

=== Production credits ===
Incomplete list of production credits for Shanti Wintergate
Yr	Release title	Artist(s)	Role
2011	Natural Disaster EP	Greg Attonito	Songwriter/producer
2011	Volcano EP	Chunksaah Records	Co-producer credit
2012	"Back to Hell Again"	Billy Manzik	Guitar

=== With Play Date ===
- 2012: Imagination (Fun Fun Records)
- 2015: We All Shine (Fun Fun Records)

== Filmography ==
=== Music videos ===
Film and television appearances by Shanti Wintergate
Year	Video title	Primary artist(s)	Director
2003	"The Beauty"	Shanti Wintergate	Shanti Wintergate
201	"Michel Gondry, I Want To Do Your Laundry"	Shanti Wintergate	Shanti Wintergate
201	"I Went for a Walk" (Animation)	Wintergate and Attonito	Jesse Cordtz
201	"Dance Like a Monster"	Play Date	The Slack Pack

=== Film and television ===
Film and television appearances by Shanti Wintergate
Year	Release title	Format	Role
2003	Charmed (ep. "Little Monsters")	TV series	"The Beauty" (featured song)
	Joan of Arcadia	TV series	"The Beauty" (featured song)
2005	CSI:NY (ep. "Jamalot")	TV series	Co-starring role "Hallie on Wheels," a roller derby girl and suspected killer
