= SS-class landing ship =

Japanese World War II ship

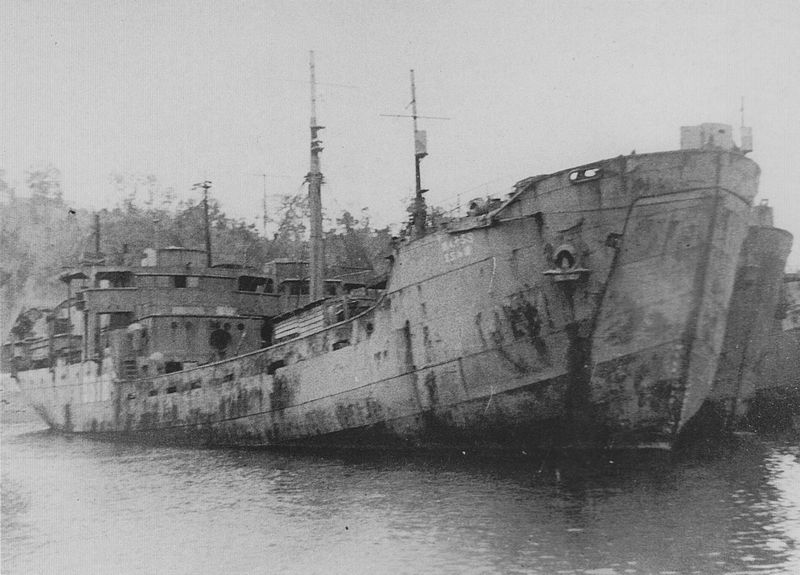
- SS No.19

Class overview
- Name: SS-class landing ship
- Builders: Harima Zōsen Corporation; Fujinagata Shipyards; Ōsaka Iron Works; Naniwa Dock Company; Kawanami Kōgyō Corporation
- Operators: Imperial Japanese Army
- Succeeded by: SB-class
- Subclasses: SS No.1 (Prototype); SS No.2 (Supplementary Prototype); SS No.3 (General production type)
- Built: 1939–1945
- In service: 1939–1947
- In commission: 1944–?
- Planned: over 30
- Completed: 18 or 21 or 22
- Lost: ?
- Retired: ?

General characteristics SS No.3 class
- Displacement: 730 long tons (742 t) gross
- Length: 65.00 m (213 ft 3 in) overall
- Beam: 9.50 m (31 ft 2 in)
- Draught: 2.89 m (9 ft 6 in)
- Draft: 5.65 m (18 ft 6 in)
- Propulsion: 2 × intermediate diesels, 2 shafts, 1,100 bhp or 1,200 bhp
- Speed: 14.0 knots (16.1 mph; 25.9 km/h); or 14.5 knots (16.7 mph; 26.9 km/h); or 13.7 knots (15.8 mph; 25.4 km/h)
- Range: 3,000 nmi (5,600 km) at 13.4 kn (15.4 mph; 24.8 km/h)
- Capacity: 5 tanks and 170 troops
- Complement: 40
- Armament: 1 × Type 4 75 mm shipboard gun; 1 × Type 96 150 mm Infantry Mortar; 3 × Type 98 20 mm AA guns

The SS-class landing ship (SS艇 or 機動艇, SS-tei or Kidōtei) was a class of amphibious assault ships of the Imperial Japanese Army which served during World War II. The SS meaning are Sensha-Small.

== Background ==
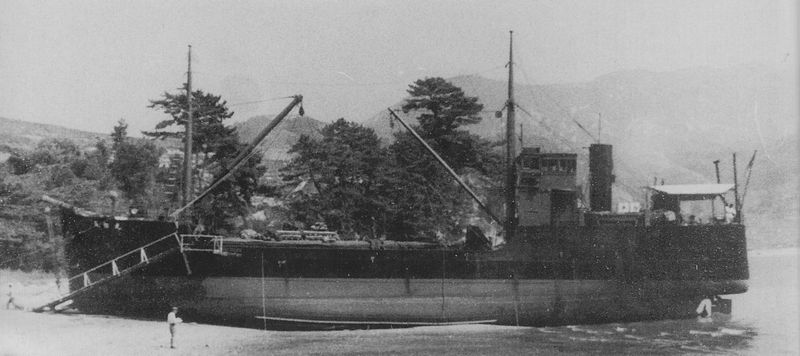
Gorō Maru in 1939

October 1938, the IJA employed the Shinshū Maru during their successful amphibious operations at Bias Bay. However, a considerable amount of time was needed to complete the operation owing to the low speed of the landing craft, which resulted in considerable damage to the vessels involved.

The IJA employed the principles of speed and minimum damage to their amphibious warfare operations.

In 1939-1940, the IJA repeated an experiment with Gorō Maru (300 tons gross) and Yorihime Maru (526 tons gross) and after analysing the experiment data placed an order for the prototype Kōryū (later SS No.1).

- The IJN was interested in the second prototype Banryū (later SS No.2). The IJN placed an order for 16 ships. However, thereafter they adopted the No.101-class and the order was cancelled.

== Ships in classes ==
=== SS No.1 ===
- Kōryū / SS No. 1 (蛟龍, 機動第一号艇)

Builder	Harima Zōsen Corporation
Laid down	18 July 1941
Launched	26 January 1942
Completed	7 April 1942
Displacement	641 long tons (651 t) gross
Length	53.9 m (176 ft 10 in) overall
Beam	9.00 m (29 ft 6 in)
Draught	3.20 m (10 ft 6 in)
Propulsion	2 × intermediate diesels, 2 shafts, 1,246 bhp
Speed	14.56 knots (16.76 mph; 26.97 km/h)

=== SS No.2 ===
- Banryū / SS No. 2 (蟠龍, 機動第二号艇)

Builder	Harima Zōsen Corporation
Laid down	8 August 1942
Launched	17 May 1943
Completed	30 July 1943
Displacement	730 long tons (742 t) gross
Length	63.02 m (206 ft 9 in) overall
Beam	9.60 m (31 ft 6 in)
Draught	4.00 m (13 ft 1 in)
Propulsion	2 × intermediate diesels, 2 shafts, 1,284 bhp
Speed	13.96 knots (16.06 mph; 25.85 km/h)
Fate	Sunk in action on 24 September 1944

=== SS No.3 class ===
- Kairyū / SS No.3 (海龍, 機動第三号艇)
- SS No.4, Sunk in action on 12 October 1944
- SS No.5, Sunk in action on 30 November 1944
- SS No.6, Sunk in action on 7 December 1944
- SS No.7
- SS No.8, Sunk in action on 19 November 1944
- SS No.9, Sunk in action on 6 December 1944
- SS No.10, went missing on the night of December 1-2, and lost with all hands after departing Palompon, Leyte. USS Conway, USS Cony, USS Eaton, and USS Sigourney, all (United States Navy) did report sinking an enemy vessel in the area the convoy would have been in.
- SS No.11
- SS No.12, Sunk in action on 21 January 1945
- SS No.13
- SS No.14, Sunk in action on 22 May 1945
- SS No.15
- SS No.16
- SS No.17
- SS No.18
- SS No.19
- SS No.20
- SS No.21
- SS No.22, Sunk in action on 10 August 1945

== See also ==
- No.101-class landing ship
- Landing craft tank

== Bibliography ==
- Monthly Armor Modelling special issue, Navy Yard Vol.9 Tora! Tora! Tora! part-2, Dainippon Kaiga (Japan), November 2008
- Rekishi Gunzō, History of Pacific War Vol.37, Support Vessels of the Imperial Japanese Forces, Gakken (Japan), June 2002, ISBN 4-05-602780-3
- Ships of the World No.506, "Kaijinsha"., (Japan), February 1996
- 50 year History of Harima Zōsen, Harima Zōsen Corporation, November 1960
