= Marinefährprahm =

Class of German landing craft

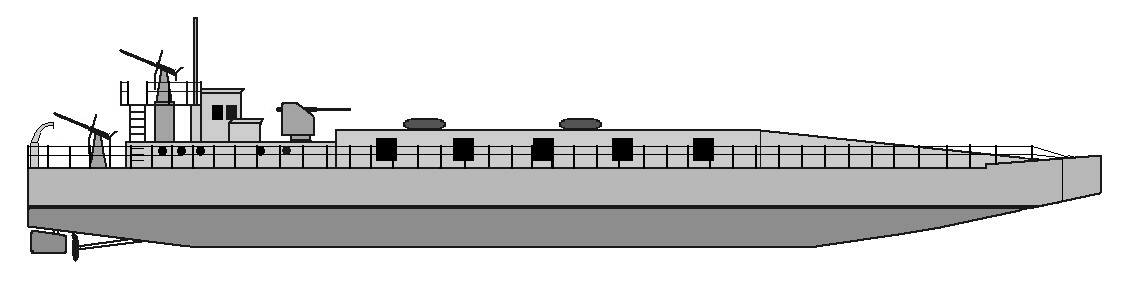
- MFP-D drawing

Class overview
- Builders: Various
- Operators: Kriegsmarine; Royal Romanian Navy; Regia Marina
- Preceded by: None
- Succeeded by: Einheitslandungsboot
- Subclasses: MFP (types A, A1, B, C, C2, D) landing craft; MFP (types AM, C2M, DM) minelayer; AFP (types A–D, DM) gunboat; MZ (1st and 2nd series) landing craft
- Built: 521 MFP-A–Cs; 289 MFP-Ds; c. 140 AFPs (converted from MFPs); c. 100 MZs
- In commission: 1941–1945

General characteristics
- Type: Landing Craft
- Displacement: 220–239 t (217–235 long tons; 243–263 short tons)
- Length: 47.04–49.84 m (154 ft 4 in – 163 ft 6 in)
- Beam: 6.53–6.59 m (21 ft 5 in – 21 ft 7 in)
- Draught: 1.7 m (5 ft 7 in)
- Installed power: 3 × 130 PS (128 hp) (MFP-A–C); 3 × 125 PS (123 hp) (MFP-D)
- Propulsion: 3 × Deutz diesel engines
- Speed: 10.5 kn (19.4 km/h; 12.1 mph) empty
- Range: Max 1,340 nmi (2,480 km; 1,540 mi) at 7 kn (13 km/h; 8.1 mph)
- Capacity: 85–140 t (84–138 long tons; 94–154 short tons)
- Complement: 17–25
- Armament: Max 1 × 7.5 cm (3.0 in) or 3.7 cm gun plus 1 or 2 × 2 cm AA guns (MFP-A–C); Max 1 × 7.5 cm or 8.8 cm (3.5 in) gun plus 1 or 2 × 3.7 cm and 1–6 × 2 cm AA guns (MFP-D); 36 mines (MFP-A–D); 50–54 mines (MFP-AM, C2M, DM)
- Armour: 20 mm (0.79 in)

The Marinefährprahm (MFP, naval ferry barge) was the largest landing craft operated by the German Kriegsmarine during World War II. The MFP was used for transport, mine laying, as an escort and a gunboat in the Mediterranean, Baltic and Black Seas as well as the English Channel and Norwegian coastal waters. Originally developed for Operation Sea Lion the proposed invasion of England, the first of these ships was commissioned on 16 April 1941, with approximately 700 being completed by the end of war. Allied sources sometimes refer to this class of vessel as a "Flak Lighter" or "F-lighter".

== Design and development ==
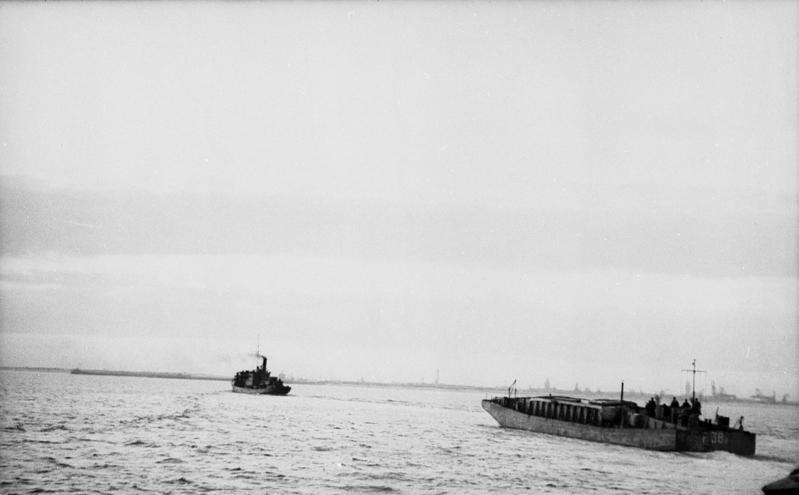
An MFP-A (right) in the Netherlands, 1942 (second half-year) or 1943

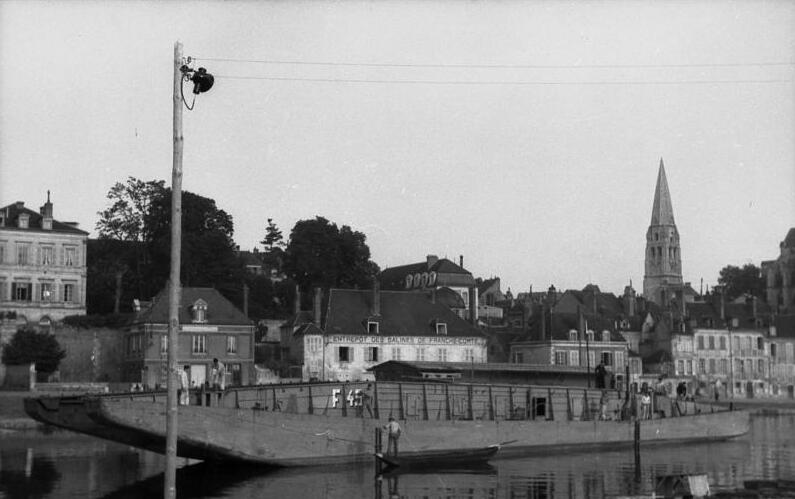
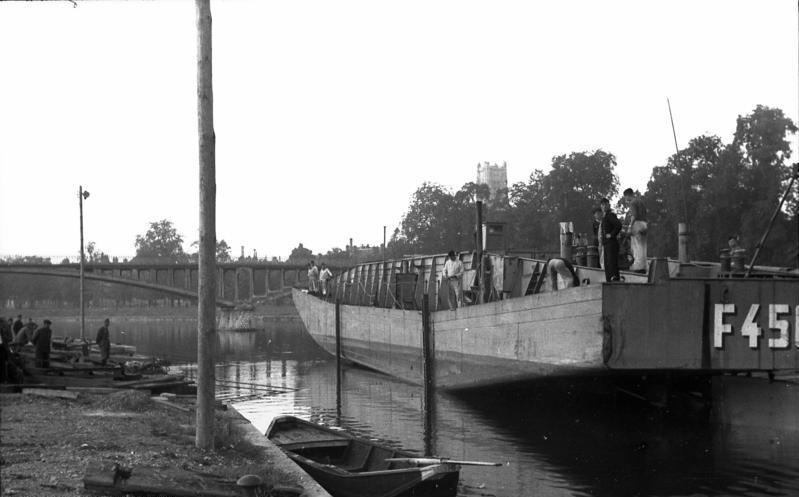
An MFP-C in Auxerre, 1943 (MFPs were transferred to the Mediterranean to supplement Italian-built craft intended for the invasion of Malta)

Four types, A–D, were developed, whose size and armament grew from type to type. Some specialised derivatives such as artillery vessels and mine laying vessels were also built on the basis of these craft. They were not mainly used for their initial invasion role but for transport and supply, escort and harbour protection. The MFPs were protected by 20 mm-thick (0.79 in) steel armour plating.

=== Type A ===
This first version of the MFP was intended to be of all-welded construction to save weight. A shortage of skilled welders meant that only the original prototype, F 100, was built that way and all following examples had extensive riveting. The original power plant of the MFP-A was to be two 600 PS (590 hp) BMW 6U engines and one 100 PS (99 hp) six-cylinder Deutz diesel truck engine. At full power, the MFP-A could make 13 kn (24 km/h; 15 mph). The BMW engines proved unreliable and used excessive amounts of fuel so it was decided to use a set of three Deutz diesel truck engines. Though this reduced the vessel's maximum speed to 10.5 kn (19.4 km/h; 12.1 mph), the loss of speed was more than offset by the greater reliability of the Deutz engines and more economical cruising range.

=== Type A1 ===
The A1s were intended for use in Operation Herkules, the planned Italo–German invasion of Malta. Ten were modified to carry captured Soviet KV-1 heavy tanks. This required strengthening and widening of the well decks and internal ramps and outward repositioning of the bow ramp counterbalance weights to make room.

=== Artilleriefährprahm ===
General characteristics Artilleriefährprahm
- Type: Gunboat
- Displacement: 300 t (300 long tons; 330 short tons)
- Length: 47.04 m (154 ft 4 in)
- Beam: 6.55 m (21 ft 6 in)
- Draught: 1.7 m (5 ft 7 in)
- Installed power: 3 × 130 PS (128 hp) (AFP-A–C); 3 × 125 PS (123 hp) (AFP-D, DM)
- Propulsion: 3 × Deutz diesel engines
- Speed: 8 kn (9.2 mph; 15 km/h)
- Range: Max 412 nmi (763 km; 474 mi)
- Complement: 48
- Armament: Max 2 × 88 mm (3.5 in) or 105 mm (4.1 in) guns; 1 × 37 mm AA gun; 2 × quadruple 20 mm AA guns (2 × 2 cm Flakvierling 38s); 1 × 15 mm machine gun
- Armour: 20 mm steel plus 100 mm concrete

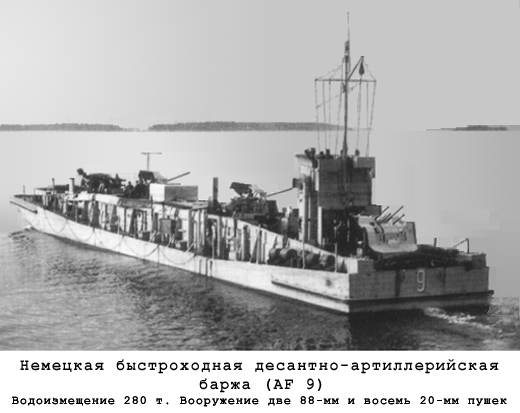
The AFP-A AF 9, 1944

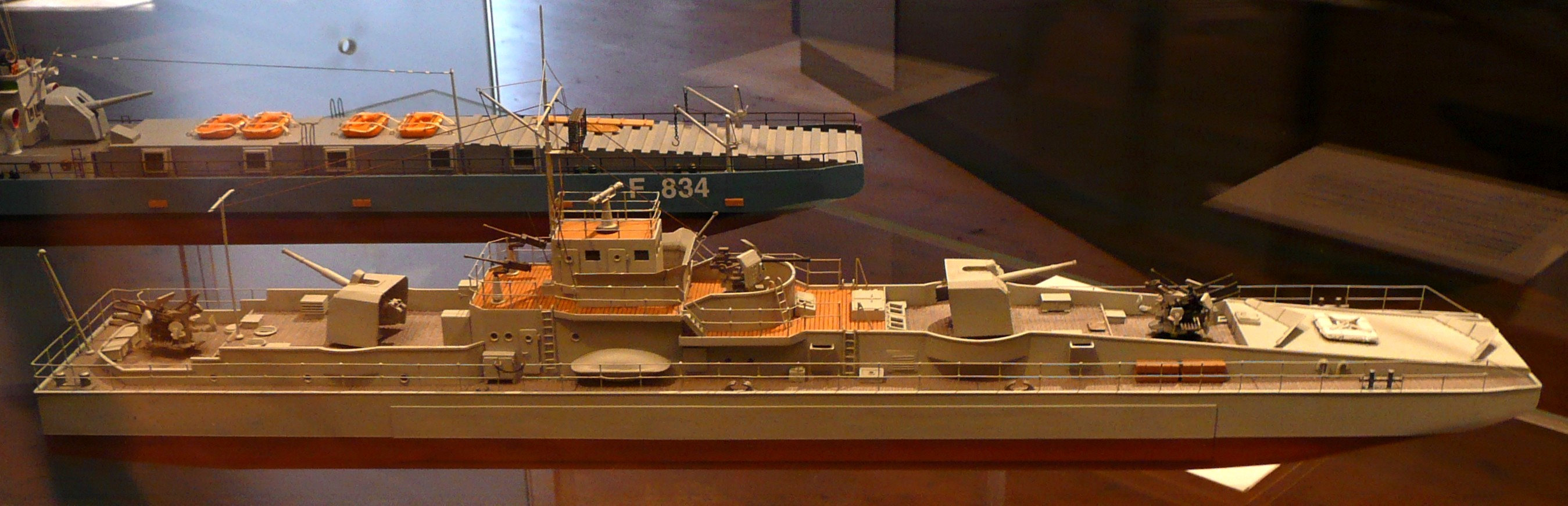
An AFP-D ship model in the Internationales Maritimes Museum Hamburg

The Artilleriefährprahm (AFP, 'artillery ferry') was a gunboat derivative of the MFP. These ships were used for escorting convoys, shore bombardment and minelaying. They were fitted with two 88 mm guns and light AA guns.

=== Motozattera ===
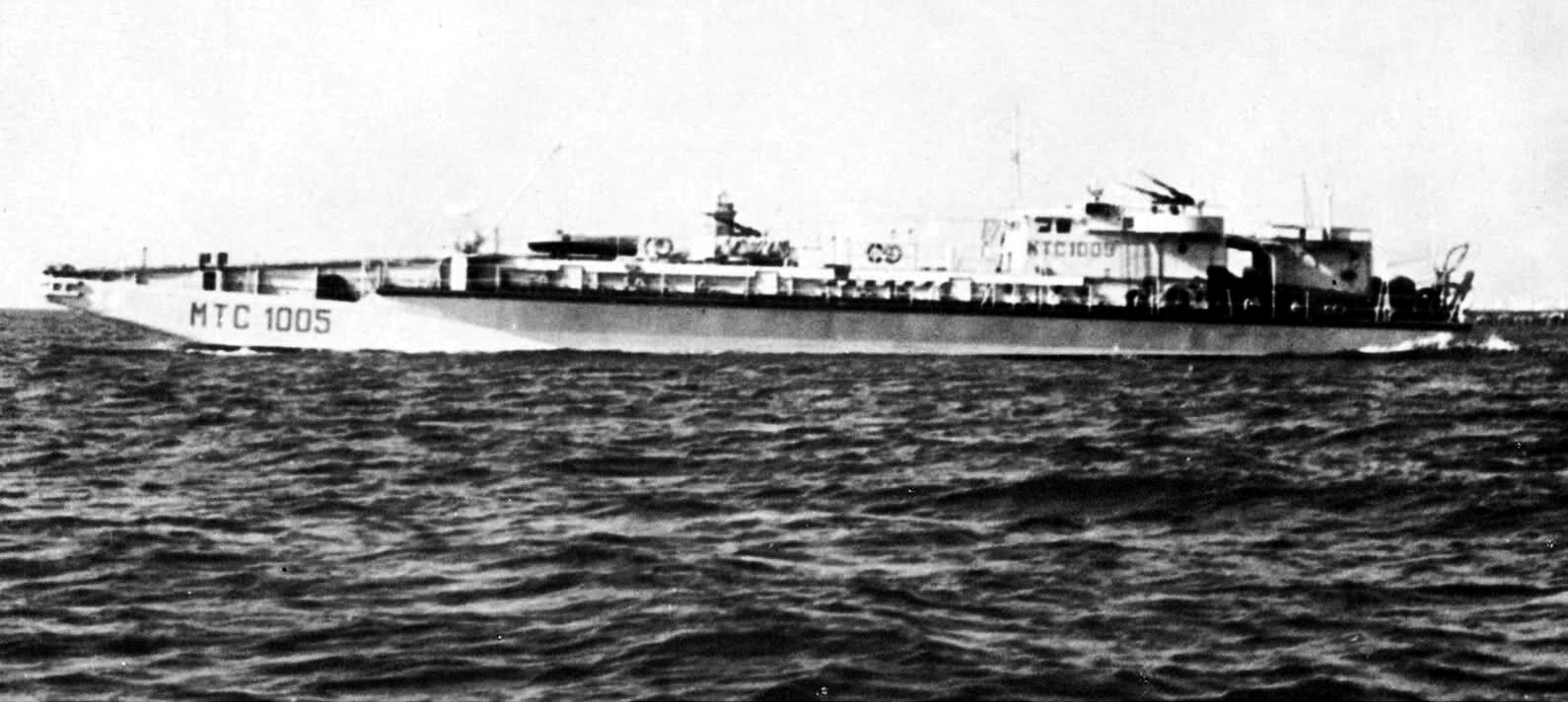
Italian Navy's MTC 1005 (ex-Italian Royal Navy's MZ 737, 1st series), 1950s

In late 1941, for Operazione C3, the invasion of Malta, the Regia Marina (Italian Royal Navy) secured the drawings of the MFP-A from the Kriegsmarine and placed an initial order for 65 vessels, numbered 701 to 765. These Bette MZ (colloquially "motozattere") were built in Italian shipyards, primarily in and around Palermo and gave the Regia Marina the amphibious capability to land infantry, armoured vehicles and supplies on beaches. Up to three M13/40 medium tanks and 100 infantry could be carried or an equivalent weight in cargo. The only major design changes were to substitute Italian diesel engines (OM BXD 150 CV (148 hp) six-cylinder types as used in the Littorina diesel trains) for the three German Deutz truck engines and to replace the German 7.5 cm deck gun with a 76 mm/40 gun. The anti-aircraft armament was usually protected with sandbags or concrete blocks.

The first motozattera was laid down in March 1942. By July of that year, the month slated for the Malta invasion, all 65 MZs were ready for deployment but on 27 July the invasion was indefinitely postponed. Many of the Italian MZs were diverted to the task of ferrying supplies from Italy to Libya and between ports along the Libyan coast to support the advance of Panzerarmee Afrika into Egypt. In September 1942, another forty MZs (761–800) were ordered. This modified version featured a raised bow to improve sea-keeping, a strengthened keel, larger fuel tanks for increased range, a lining of 100 mm (3.9 in) thick concrete armour for anti-splinter protection and a second 20 mm AA gun mounted amidships. The Italian MZs played a key role in defeating Operation Agreement, an attempted Allied landing in Tobruk on 14 September 1942, when they drove off an MTB flotilla in the port of Tobruk. The MZs captured an amphibious motor barge and two lighters attempting to reach Alexandria with stragglers, among them Captain John Micklethwait, the commander of HMS Sikh.

A third series of forty MZs was ordered in June 1943 but none were ever completed. A further 20 examples (MZ 801–820) were planned, copies of the MFP-D (including the same engines and armament) but were never built as by then the war situation for Italy had worsened considerably and her armed forces had been expelled from North Africa. Ninety-five motozattere were built in Italian shipyards prior to the Armistice of Cassibile with the Allies on 8 September 1943.

== Operations ==
The first use of the Marinefährprahm was during Operation Barbarossa, the German invasion of the Soviet Union. Twelve Marinefährprähme were used during Operation Beowulf II as part of the German invasion of Saaremaa, Hiiumaa and Muhu on 14 September 1941. The Marinefährprahm provided logistical support during the Siege of Sevastopol in June 1942. Twenty-four Marinefährprähme from 1. Landungs-Flotille transported a Kampfgruppe from the 46th Infantry Division across the Kerch Strait to the Taman Peninsula as part of Operation Blücher II on the night of 2 September 1942.

Between January and October 1943, Marinefährprähme were used to evacuate the 17th Army from the Kuban bridgehead on the Taman Peninsula in southern Russia, despite Soviet attacks during the Battle of the Caucasus. The sea evacuation brought out 239,669 soldiers, 16,311 wounded, 27,456 civilians and 115,477 tons of military equipment (primarily ammunition), 21,230 vehicles, 74 tanks, 1,815 guns and 74,657 horses to the Crimea. In February 1944, three MFPs were purchased by the Romanian Navy and renamed PTA-404, PTA-405 and PTA-406.

== See also ==
- Landing craft tank, an equivalent Allied naval class

== Bibliography ==
- "Deutsche Landungsfahrzeuge des 2. Weltkrieges" [German landing craft of the Second World War]. Historisches Marinearchiv (in German). Archived from the original on December 19, 2024.
- Forczyk, Robert (2016). We March against England: Operation Sea Lion 1940–41. London: Bloomsbury. ISBN 978-1-4728-1486-9.
- Gröner, Erich; Jung, Dieter; Maass, Martin (1990). Die deutschen Kriegsschiffe, 1815–1945 [German Warships, 1815–1945] (in German). Vol. VII. Koblenz, DE: Bernard & Graefe Verlag. ISBN 3-7637-4807-5.
- Heckmann, Wolf (1981). Rommel's War in Africa. Garden City, NY: Doubleday & Company. ISBN 0-385-14420-2.
- Koslinski, Nicolae; Stănescu, Raymond (1996). Marina română in al doilea război mondial 1939–1945: 1942–1944 [Rumanian Navy in World War II: 1942–1944] (in Romanian). Vol. II. București: Făt-Frumos. ISBN 978-9-73-552033-5.
- Landsborough, Gordon (2015). Tobruk Commando: The Raid to Destroy Rommel's Base. Frontline Books. ISBN 978-1-84832-245-5.
- Marcon, Tullio (1998). I Mule del Mare [Mule of the Sea]. Parma: Albertelli. ISBN 978-88-87372-02-1.
- Pickert, Wolfgang (1955). Vom Kuban-Brückenkopf bis Sewastopol. Flakartillerie im Verband der 17. Armee [From Kuban bridgehead to Sevastopol. Anti-aircraft artillery in the 17th Army]. Die Wehrmacht im Kampf. Vol. VII. Heidelberg: Vowinckel. OCLC 966399452. ZDB-ID 521615-1.
- Reynolds, Leonard C. (2002) [1955]. Motor Gunboat 658: The Small Boat War in the Mediterranean (Cassell Military Paperbacks ed.). London: William Kimber. ISBN 0-304-36183-6. (Originally published as Gunboat 658: The story of the Operations of a Motor Gunboat in the Mediterranean from the Fall of Tunisia until the German Surrender)
- Riccio, Almerico. "Le Motozattere della Regia Marina all' 8 Settembre 1943". Controstoria Futura [Future Counter-History] (in Italian). Istituto di Studi Storici Economici e Sociali.
- Sadler, John (2016). Operation Agreement: Jewish Commandos and the Raid on Tobruk. London: Bloomsbury. ISBN 978-1-4728-1489-0.
- Zhukov, Denis (25 June 2003). "Marinefährprahm". German Naval History (in German).
