= Imperial Japanese Navy ship classifications =

Imperial Japanese Navy ship classifications went through various changes between 1871 and 1945, as technology changed and new ship classes were added while those that became obsolete were discontinued. There were efforts to translate some ships' classes that were imported or in use by other navies, while incorporating any classification system into Japanese language conventions and maintaining an internal consistency.

== Classification terminology ==
These were legal classifications of the naval vessels of the Imperial Japanese Navy. Therefore, those names are different from universal classifications and class names.

In laws, ordinances, regulations, and policies pertaining to the Imperial Japanese Navy, there were no classifications related to the light aircraft carrier, escort carrier, heavy cruiser or light cruiser. Even if it is assumed that these translation were different in the Japanese language, there could be the same phrase and class in English language, and vice versa.

- Example 1: Kōsakukan (工作艦) and Kōsakusen (工作船) = Repair ship.
- Example 2: Fusetukan (敷設艦), Fusetsusen (敷設船), and Fusetsutei (敷設艇) = Minelayer.

The suffix of ship classes could also relate the type or structure of the vessel, which may carry a slightly different connotation than the translated English term. SOme examples:

- -kan (艦) = Vessel or Ship, example: Kōsakukan is Repair vessel; Senkan is a Battleship.
- -sen (船) = Ship, example: Kōsakusen is Repair ship.
- -tei (艇) = Boat, example: Fusetsutei is Mine boat.

== Representative classification tables ==
=== 28 October 1871 (Initial) ===
- 28 October 1871, Rules of the Navy, and officer's salary schedules, Article 3 and 4, Ministry of War (明治4年10月28日 兵部省 海軍規則並諸官俸給表 第3條および第4條, 1871 Kaigun kisoku narabini shokan hōkyūhyō)

Warship (軍艦, Gunkan)	Large vessel (大艦, Daikan)	1st class warship (一等軍艦, Ittō Gunkan)	Ironclad warship: And over 450 horsepower steamship Others: And over 600 horsepower steamship, or, and over 500 crewmen
Warship (軍艦, Gunkan)	Large vessel (大艦, Daikan)	2nd class warship (二等軍艦, Nitō Gunkan)	Ironclad warship: And over 150 hp steamship Others: And over 450 hp steamship, or, and over 300 crewmen
Warship (軍艦, Gunkan)	Medium vessel (中艦, Chūkan)	3rd class warship (三等軍艦, Santō Gunkan)	Ironclad warship: Less than 150 hp steamship Others: And over 250 hp steamship, or, and over 200 crewmen
Warship (軍艦, Gunkan)	Medium vessel (中艦, Chūkan)	4th class warship (四等軍艦, Yontō Gunkan)	And over 150 hp steamship, or, and over 120 crewmen
Warship (軍艦, Gunkan)	Small vessel (小艦, Shōkan)	5th class warship (五等軍艦, Gotō Gunkan)	And over 80 hp steamship, or, and over 50 crewmen
Warship (軍艦, Gunkan)	Small vessel (小艦, Shōkan)	6th class warship (六等軍艦, Rokutō Gunkan)	And over 50 hp steamship, or, and over 30 crewmen
Warship (軍艦, Gunkan)	Small vessel (小艦, Shōkan)	7th class warship (七等軍艦, Nanatō Gunkan)	Less than 50 hp steamship, or, and less than 30 crewmen

=== 5 October 1872 ===
- 5 October 1872, Revision of the Naval ship classes (明治5年10月4日 海軍省軍務局 艦船等級更正ノ件, 1872 Kansen tōkyū kōsei-no ken)

Warship	Large vessel	1st class warship	Ironclad warship: And over 170 crewmen Others: And over 455 crewmen
Warship	Large vessel	2nd class warship	Ironclad warship: And over 65 crewmen Others: And over 315 crewmen
Warship	Large vessel	3rd class warship	Ironclad warship: Less than 65 crewmen Others: And over 170 crewmen
Warship	Medium vessel	4th class warship	And over 100 crewmen
Warship	Medium vessel	5th class warship	And over 65 crewmen
Warship	Small vessel	6th class warship	And over 40 crewmen
Warship	Small vessel	7th class warship	Less than 39 crewmen
Transport vessel (運送艦, Unsōkan)		4th class transport vessel (四等運送艦, Yontō Unsōkan)	And over 800 tons displacement
Transport vessel (運送艦, Unsōkan)		5th class transport vessel (五等運送艦, Gotō Unsōkan)	And over 500 tons displacement
Transport vessel (運送艦, Unsōkan)		6th class transport vessel (六等運送艦, Rokutō Unsōkan)	And over 200 tons displacement
Transport vessel (運送艦, Unsōkan)		7th class transport vessel (七等運送艦, Nanatō Unsōkan)	And under 200 tons displacement

=== 13 August 1890 ===
- 13 August 1890, Notice No. 291, "Naval ships ordinance, Article 2", Minister's Secretariat (明治23年8月13日 海軍大臣官房 達第291号 海軍艦船籍條例 第2條, 1890 Kaigun kansenseki jōrei)

Naval ships (海軍艦船, Kaigun Kansen)	Category 'A' ship (第一種艦船, Daiisshu Kansen)	Warship as fighting ship (戦闘航海ノ役務ニ堪フル軍艦, Sentōkōkai-no ekimu-ni tauru gunkan)
Naval ships (海軍艦船, Kaigun Kansen)	Category 'B' ship (第二種艦船, Dainishu Kansen)	Torpedo boat (水雷艇, Suiraitei)
Naval ships (海軍艦船, Kaigun Kansen)	Category 'C' ship (第三種艦船, Daisanshu Kansen)	Warship as noncombatant ship (戦闘航海ノ役務ニ堪ヘサル軍艦, Sentōkōkai-no ekimu-ni taezaru gunkan)
Naval ships (海軍艦船, Kaigun Kansen)	Category 'D' ship (第四種艦船, Daiyonshu Kansen)	Transport ship (運送船, Unsōsen), Tugboat (曳船, Eisen) and Small sized steamer (小蒸気船, Shō jōkisen)
Naval ships (海軍艦船, Kaigun Kansen)	Category 'E' ship (第五種艦船, Daigoshu Kansen)	Storage ship (倉庫船, Sōkosen), Loading ship (荷船, Nisen) and Miscellaneous ship (雑船, Zatsusen)

=== 1 April 1896 ===
- 1896 Imperial edict No. 71, "Naval ships ordinance, Article 3" (明治29年 勅令第71号 海軍艦船條例 第3條, 1896 Chokurei Dai-71-gō, Kaigun kansen jōrei)

Naval ships	Category 'A' warship (第一種軍艦, Daiisshu Gunkan)	Warship as fighting ship
Naval ships	Category 'B' warship (第二種軍艦, Dainishu Gunkan)	Warship as noncombatant ship
Naval ships	Torpedo boat	1st class torpedo boat (一等水雷艇, Ittō Suiraitei)
Naval ships	Torpedo boat	2nd class torpedo boat (二等水雷艇, Nitō Suiraitei)
Naval ships	Torpedo boat	3rd class torpedo boat (三等水雷艇, Santō Suiraitei)
Naval ships	Miscellaneous ships (雑役船舟, Zatsuekisenshū)	

=== 21 March 1898 ===
- Standard classifications of the naval warships and torpedo boats (海軍軍艦及水雷艇類別標準, Kaigun gunkan oyobi suiraitei ruibetsu-hyōjun)

Warships	Battleship (戦艦, Senkan)	1st class battleship (一等戦艦, Ittō Senkan)
Warships	Battleship (戦艦, Senkan)	2nd class battleship (二等戦艦, Nitō Senkan)
Warships	Cruiser (巡洋艦, Jun'yōkan)	1st class cruiser (一等巡洋艦, Ittō Jun'yōkan)
Warships	Cruiser (巡洋艦, Jun'yōkan)	2nd class cruiser (二等巡洋艦, Nitō Jun'yōkan)
Warships	Cruiser (巡洋艦, Jun'yōkan)	3rd class cruiser (三等巡洋艦, Santō Jun'yōkan)
Warships	Coast defence ship (海防艦, Kaibōkan)	1st class coast defence ship (一等海防艦, Ittō Kaibōkan)
Warships	Coast defence ship (海防艦, Kaibōkan)	2nd class coast defence ship (二等海防艦, Nitō Kaibōkan)
Warships	Coast defence ship (海防艦, Kaibōkan)	3rd class coast defence ship (三等海防艦, Santō Kaibōkan)
Warships	Gunboat (砲艦, Hōkan)	1st class gunboat (一等砲艦, Ittō Hōkan)
Warships	Gunboat (砲艦, Hōkan)	2nd class gunboat (二等砲艦, Nitō Hōkan)
Warships	Dispatch vessel (通報艦, Tsūhōkan)	
Warships	Torpedo boat tender (水雷母艦, Suiraibokan)	
Torpedo boat		Torpedo boat destroyer (水雷艇駆逐艇, Suiraiteikuchikutei)
Torpedo boat		1st class torpedo boat
Torpedo boat		2nd class torpedo boat
Torpedo boat		3rd class torpedo boat
Torpedo boat		4th class torpedo boat (四等水雷艇, Yontō Suiraitei)

=== 22 June 1900 ===
- Standard classifications of the naval vessels (海軍艦艇類別標準, Kaigun kantei ruibetsu-hyōjun)

Naval vessels (艦艇, Kantei)	Warships	Battleship	1st class battleship
Naval vessels (艦艇, Kantei)	Warships	Battleship	2nd class battleship
Naval vessels (艦艇, Kantei)	Warships	Cruiser	1st class cruiser
Naval vessels (艦艇, Kantei)	Warships	Cruiser	2nd class cruiser
Naval vessels (艦艇, Kantei)	Warships	Cruiser	3rd class cruiser
Naval vessels (艦艇, Kantei)	Warships	Coast defence ship	1st class coast defence ship
Naval vessels (艦艇, Kantei)	Warships	Coast defence ship	2nd class coast defence ship
Naval vessels (艦艇, Kantei)	Warships	Coast defence ship	3rd class coast defence ship
Naval vessels (艦艇, Kantei)	Warships	Gunboat	1st class gunboat
Naval vessels (艦艇, Kantei)	Warships	Gunboat	2nd class gunboat
Naval vessels (艦艇, Kantei)	Warships	Dispatch vessel	
Naval vessels (艦艇, Kantei)	Warships	Torpedo boat tender	
Naval vessels (艦艇, Kantei)	Warships	Destroyer (駆逐艦, Kuchikukan)	
Naval vessels (艦艇, Kantei)	Torpedo boat		1st class torpedo boat
Naval vessels (艦艇, Kantei)	Torpedo boat		2nd class torpedo boat
Naval vessels (艦艇, Kantei)	Torpedo boat		3rd class torpedo boat
Naval vessels (艦艇, Kantei)	Torpedo boat		4th class torpedo boat

=== 28 August 1912 ===
- Standard classifications of the naval vessels

Naval vessels	Warships	Battleship	
Naval vessels	Warships	Battlecruiser (巡洋戦艦, Jun'yōsenkan)	
Naval vessels	Warships	Cruiser	1st class cruiser
Naval vessels	Warships	Cruiser	2nd class cruiser
Naval vessels	Warships	Coast defence ship	1st class coast defence ship
Naval vessels	Warships	Coast defence ship	2nd class coast defence ship
Naval vessels	Warships	Gunboat	1st class gunboat
Naval vessels	Warships	Gunboat	2nd class gunboat
Naval vessels	Destroyer		
Naval vessels	Torpedo boat		1st class torpedo boat
Naval vessels	Torpedo boat		2nd class torpedo boat
Naval vessels	Submersible (潜水艇, Sensuitei)		
Repair ship (工作船, Kōsakusen)			
Transport ship			
Hospital ship (病院船, Byōinsen)			

=== 17 May 1916 ===
- Standard classifications of the naval vessels

Naval vessels	Warships	Battleship	
Naval vessels	Warships	Battlecruiser	
Naval vessels	Warships	Cruiser	1st class cruiser
Naval vessels	Warships	Cruiser	2nd class cruiser
Naval vessels	Warships	Coast defence ship	1st class coast defence ship
Naval vessels	Warships	Coast defence ship	2nd class coast defence ship
Naval vessels	Warships	Gunboat	1st class gunboat
Naval vessels	Warships	Gunboat	2nd class gunboat
Naval vessels	Destroyer		1st class destroyer (一等駆逐艦, Ittō Kuchikukan)
Naval vessels	Destroyer		2nd class destroyer (二等駆逐艦, Nitō Kuchikukan)
Naval vessels	Destroyer		3rd class destroyer (三等駆逐艦, Santō Kuchikukan)
Naval vessels	Torpedo boat		1st class torpedo boat
Naval vessels	Torpedo boat		2nd class torpedo boat
Naval vessels	Submersible		
Auxiliary ships (特務船, Tokumusen)	Repair ship		
Auxiliary ships (特務船, Tokumusen)	Transport ship		
Auxiliary ships (特務船, Tokumusen)	Minelaying ship (敷設船, Fusetsusen)		

=== 1 April 1920 ===
- Standard classifications of the naval vessels

Naval vessels	Warships	Battleship	
Naval vessels	Warships	Battlecruiser	
Naval vessels	Warships	Cruiser	1st class cruiser
Naval vessels	Warships	Cruiser	2nd class cruiser
Naval vessels	Warships	Aircraft carrier (航空母艦, Kōkūbokan)	
Naval vessels	Warships	Torpedo boat tender	
Naval vessels	Warships	Minelayer (敷設艦, Fusetsukan)	
Naval vessels	Warships	Coast defence ship	1st class coast defence ship
Naval vessels	Warships	Coast defence ship	2nd class coast defence ship
Naval vessels	Warships	Gunboat	1st class gunboat
Naval vessels	Warships	Gunboat	2nd class gunboat
Naval vessels	Destroyer		1st class destroyer
Naval vessels	Destroyer		2nd class destroyer
Naval vessels	Destroyer		3rd class destroyer
Naval vessels	Torpedo boat		1st class torpedo boat
Naval vessels	Torpedo boat		2nd class torpedo boat
Naval vessels	Submarine (潜水艦, Sensuikan)		1st class submarine (一等潜水艦, Ittō Sensuikan)
Naval vessels	Submarine (潜水艦, Sensuikan)		2nd class submarine (二等潜水艦, Nitō Sensuikan)
Naval vessels	Submarine (潜水艦, Sensuikan)		3rd class submarine (三等潜水艦, Santō Sensuikan)

- Standard classifications of the naval auxiliary vessels (海軍特務艦艇類別標準, Kaigun tokumu-kantei ruibetsu-hyōjun)

Auxiliary vessels (特務艦艇, Tokumu-kantei)	Auxiliary vessel (特務艦, Tokumukan)	Repair vessel (工作艦, Kōsakukan)	
Auxiliary vessels (特務艦艇, Tokumu-kantei)	Auxiliary vessel (特務艦, Tokumukan)	Transport vessel	
Auxiliary vessels (特務艦艇, Tokumu-kantei)	Auxiliary boat (特務艇, Tokumutei)	Minesweeper (掃海艇, Sōkaitei)	1st class minesweeper (一等掃海艇, Ittō Sōkaitei)
Auxiliary vessels (特務艦艇, Tokumu-kantei)	Auxiliary boat (特務艇, Tokumutei)	Minesweeper (掃海艇, Sōkaitei)	2nd class minesweeper (二等掃海艇, Nitō Sōkaitei)
Auxiliary vessels (特務艦艇, Tokumu-kantei)	Auxiliary boat (特務艇, Tokumutei)	Submarine depot boat (潜水艦母艇, Sensuikanbotei)	

=== 1 December 1924 ===
- Standard classifications of the naval vessels

Naval vessels	Warships	Battleship	
Naval vessels	Warships	Battlecruiser	
Naval vessels	Warships	Cruiser	1st class cruiser
Naval vessels	Warships	Cruiser	2nd class cruiser
Naval vessels	Warships	Aircraft carrier	
Naval vessels	Warships	Submarine tender (潜水母艦, Sensuibokan)	
Naval vessels	Warships	Minelayer	
Naval vessels	Warships	Coast defence ship	1st class coast defence ship
Naval vessels	Warships	Coast defence ship	2nd class coast defence ship
Naval vessels	Warships	Gunboat	1st class gunboat
Naval vessels	Warships	Gunboat	2nd class gunboat
Naval vessels	Destroyer		1st class destroyer
Naval vessels	Destroyer		2nd class destroyer
Naval vessels	Destroyer		3rd class destroyer
Naval vessels	Submarine		1st class submarine
Naval vessels	Submarine		2nd class submarine
Naval vessels	Submarine		3rd class submarine
Naval vessels	Minesweeper		

- Standard classifications of the naval auxiliary vessels

Auxiliary vessels	Auxiliary vessel	Repair vessel	
Auxiliary vessels	Auxiliary vessel	Transport vessel	
Auxiliary vessels	Auxiliary vessel	Icebreaker (砕氷艦, Saihyōkan)	
Auxiliary vessels	Auxiliary vessel	Survey ship (測量艦, Sokuryōkan)	
Auxiliary vessels	Auxiliary vessel	Target ship (標的艦, Hyōtekikan)	
Auxiliary vessels	Auxiliary vessel	Auxiliary training ship (練習特務艦, Renshūtokumukan)	
Auxiliary vessels	Auxiliary boat	Mine boat (敷設艇, Fusetsutei)	1st class mine boat (一等敷設艇, Ittō Fusetsutei)
Auxiliary vessels	Auxiliary boat	Mine boat (敷設艇, Fusetsutei)	2nd class mine boat (二等敷設艇, Nitō Fusetsutei)
Auxiliary vessels	Auxiliary boat	Mine boat (敷設艇, Fusetsutei)	3rd class mine boat (三等敷設艇, Santō Fusetsutei)
Auxiliary vessels	Auxiliary boat	Auxiliary minesweeper (掃海特務艇, Sōkaitokumutei)	1st class auxiliary minesweeper (一等掃海特務艇, Ittō Sōkaitokumutei)
Auxiliary vessels	Auxiliary boat	Auxiliary minesweeper (掃海特務艇, Sōkaitokumutei)	2nd class auxiliary minesweeper (二等掃海特務艇, Nitō Sōkaitokumutei)
Auxiliary vessels	Auxiliary boat	Submarine depot boat	

=== 2 March 1927 ===
- Standard classifications of the naval vessels

Naval vessels	Warships	Battleship	
Naval vessels	Warships	Battlecruiser	
Naval vessels	Warships	Cruiser	1st class cruiser
Naval vessels	Warships	Cruiser	2nd class cruiser
Naval vessels	Warships	Aircraft carrier	
Naval vessels	Warships	Submarine tender	
Naval vessels	Warships	Minelayer	
Naval vessels	Warships	Rapid extension netlayer (急設網艦, Kyūsetsumōkan)	
Naval vessels	Warships	Coast defence ship	1st class coast defence ship
Naval vessels	Warships	Coast defence ship	2nd class coast defence ship
Naval vessels	Warships	Gunboat	1st class gunboat
Naval vessels	Warships	Gunboat	2nd class gunboat
Naval vessels	Destroyer		1st class destroyer
Naval vessels	Destroyer		2nd class destroyer
Naval vessels	Destroyer		3rd class destroyer
Naval vessels	Submarine		1st class submarine
Naval vessels	Submarine		2nd class submarine
Naval vessels	Submarine		3rd class submarine
Naval vessels	Minesweeper		

- Standard classifications of the naval auxiliary vessels

Auxiliary vessels	Auxiliary vessel	Repair vessel	
Auxiliary vessels	Auxiliary vessel	Transport vessel	
Auxiliary vessels	Auxiliary vessel	Icebreaker	
Auxiliary vessels	Auxiliary vessel	Survey ship	
Auxiliary vessels	Auxiliary vessel	Target ship	
Auxiliary vessels	Auxiliary vessel	Auxiliary training ship	
Auxiliary vessels	Auxiliary boat	Mine boat	1st class mine boat
Auxiliary vessels	Auxiliary boat	Mine boat	2nd class mine boat
Auxiliary vessels	Auxiliary boat	Mine boat	3rd class mine boat
Auxiliary vessels	Auxiliary boat	Capture-net layer (捕獲網艇, Hokakumōtei)	
Auxiliary vessels	Auxiliary boat	Auxiliary minesweeper	1st class auxiliary minesweeper
Auxiliary vessels	Auxiliary boat	Auxiliary minesweeper	2nd class auxiliary minesweeper
Auxiliary vessels	Auxiliary boat	Submarine depot boat	

=== 30 May 1931 ===
- Standard classifications of the naval vessels

Naval vessels	Warships	Battleship	
Naval vessels	Warships	Cruiser	1st class cruiser
Naval vessels	Warships	Cruiser	2nd class cruiser
Naval vessels	Warships	Aircraft carrier	
Naval vessels	Warships	Submarine tender	
Naval vessels	Warships	Minelayer	
Naval vessels	Warships	Coast defence ship	
Naval vessels	Warships	Gunboat	
Naval vessels	Warships	Training battleship (練習戦艦, Renshū senkan)	
Naval vessels	Warships	Training cruiser (練習巡洋艦, Renshū jun'yōkan)	
Naval vessels	Destroyer		1st class destroyer
Naval vessels	Destroyer		2nd class destroyer
Naval vessels	Submarine		1st class submarine
Naval vessels	Submarine		2nd class submarine
Naval vessels	Torpedo boat		
Naval vessels	Minesweeper		

- Standard classifications of the naval auxiliary vessels

Auxiliary vessels	Auxiliary vessel	Repair vessel
Auxiliary vessels	Auxiliary vessel	Transport vessel
Auxiliary vessels	Auxiliary vessel	Icebreaker
Auxiliary vessels	Auxiliary vessel	Survey ship
Auxiliary vessels	Auxiliary vessel	Target ship
Auxiliary vessels	Auxiliary vessel	Auxiliary training ship
Auxiliary vessels	Auxiliary boat	Mine boat
Auxiliary vessels	Auxiliary boat	Auxiliary minesweeper
Auxiliary vessels	Auxiliary boat	Submarine depot boat

=== 26 June 1941 ===
- Standard classifications of the naval vessels

Naval vessels	Warships	Battleship	
Naval vessels	Warships	Cruiser	1st class cruiser
Naval vessels	Warships	Cruiser	2nd class cruiser
Naval vessels	Warships	Aircraft carrier	
Naval vessels	Warships	Seaplane tender (水上機母艦, Suijōkibokan)	
Naval vessels	Warships	Submarine tender	
Naval vessels	Warships	Minelayer	
Naval vessels	Warships	Coast defence ship	
Naval vessels	Warships	Gunboat	
Naval vessels	Warships	Training battleship	
Naval vessels	Warships	Training cruiser	
Naval vessels	Destroyer		1st class destroyer
Naval vessels	Destroyer		2nd class destroyer
Naval vessels	Submarine		1st class submarine
Naval vessels	Submarine		2nd class submarine
Naval vessels	Torpedo boat		
Naval vessels	Minesweeper		
Naval vessels	Submarine chaser (駆潜艇, Kusentei)		

- Standard classifications of the naval auxiliary vessels

Auxiliary vessels	Auxiliary vessel	Repair vessel
Auxiliary vessels	Auxiliary vessel	Transport vessel
Auxiliary vessels	Auxiliary vessel	Icebreaker
Auxiliary vessels	Auxiliary vessel	Survey ship
Auxiliary vessels	Auxiliary vessel	Target ship
Auxiliary vessels	Auxiliary vessel	Auxiliary training ship
Auxiliary vessels	Auxiliary boat	Mine boat
Auxiliary vessels	Auxiliary boat	Auxiliary submarine chaser (駆潜特務艇, Kusentokumutei)
Auxiliary vessels	Auxiliary boat	Auxiliary minesweeper
Auxiliary vessels	Auxiliary boat	Patrol boat (哨戒艇, Shōkaitei)
Auxiliary vessels	Auxiliary boat	Cable layer (電纜敷設艇, Denranfusetsutei)
Auxiliary vessels	Auxiliary boat	Motor torpedo boat (魚雷艇, Gyoraitei)
Auxiliary vessels	Auxiliary boat	Submarine depot boat

=== 30 June 1945 (Final) ===
- Standard classifications of the naval vessels

Naval vessels	Warships	Battleship	
Naval vessels	Warships	Cruiser	1st class cruiser
Naval vessels	Warships	Cruiser	2nd class cruiser
Naval vessels	Warships	Aircraft carrier	
Naval vessels	Warships	Seaplane tender	
Naval vessels	Warships	Submarine tender	
Naval vessels	Warships	Minelayer	
Naval vessels	Warships	Training battleship	
Naval vessels	Warships	Training cruiser	
Naval vessels	Destroyer		1st class destroyer
Naval vessels	Destroyer		2nd class destroyer
Naval vessels	Submarine		1st class submarine
Naval vessels	Submarine		2nd class submarine
Naval vessels	Coast defence ship		
Naval vessels	Gunboat		
Naval vessels	Torpedo boat		
Naval vessels	Minesweeper		
Naval vessels	Submarine chaser		
Naval vessels	Patrol boat		
Naval vessels	Landing ship (輸送艦, Yusōkan)		1st class landing ship (一等輸送艦, Ittō Yusōkan)
Naval vessels	Landing ship (輸送艦, Yusōkan)		2nd class landing ship (二等輸送艦, Nitō Yusōkan)
Naval vessels	Mine boat		

- Standard classifications of the naval auxiliary vessels

Auxiliary vessels	Auxiliary vessel	Repair vessel
Auxiliary vessels	Auxiliary vessel	Transport vessel
Auxiliary vessels	Auxiliary vessel	Icebreaker
Auxiliary vessels	Auxiliary vessel	Survey ship
Auxiliary vessels	Auxiliary vessel	Target ship
Auxiliary vessels	Auxiliary vessel	Auxiliary training ship
Auxiliary vessels	Auxiliary boat	Auxiliary mine boat (敷設特務艇, Fusetsutokumutei)
Auxiliary vessels	Auxiliary boat	Auxiliary submarine chaser
Auxiliary vessels	Auxiliary boat	Auxiliary patrol boat (哨戒特務艇, Shōkaitokumutei)
Auxiliary vessels	Auxiliary boat	Auxiliary minesweeper
Auxiliary vessels	Auxiliary boat	Cable layer
Auxiliary vessels	Auxiliary boat	Motor torpedo boat
Auxiliary vessels	Auxiliary boat	Coast defence boat (海防艇, Kaibōtei)

== Detailed classification tables ==
=== Battleship ===
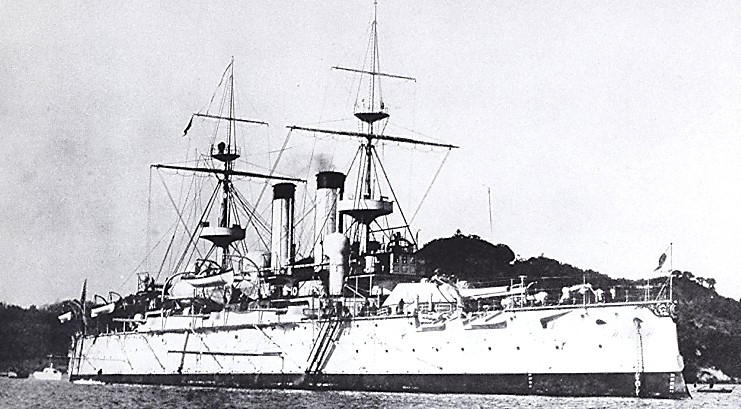
1st class battleship Yashima

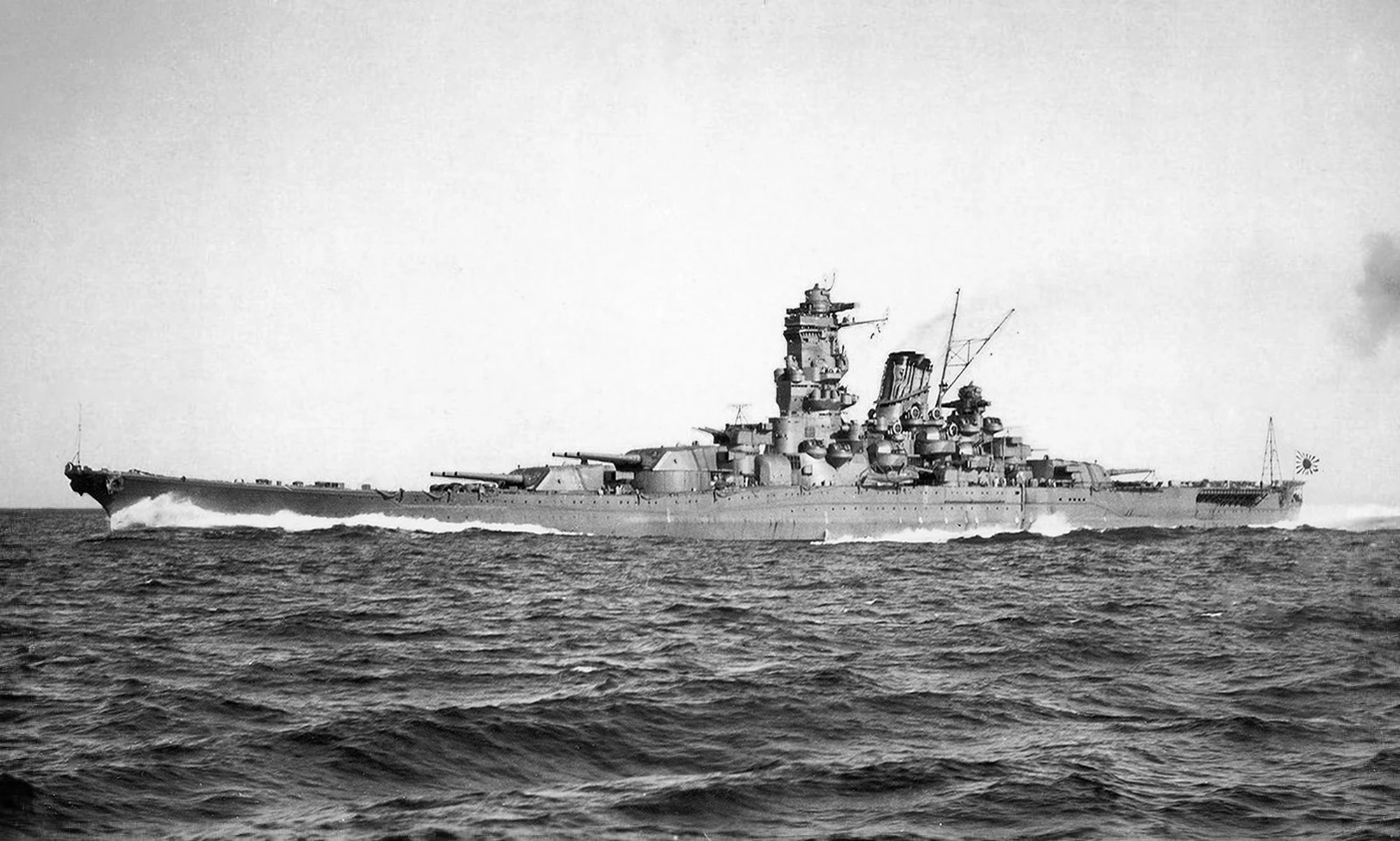
Battleship Yamato

Date	Top classification	Higher classification	Classification	Lower classification	Note, classification boundary
21 March 1898	Warships		Battleship	1st class battleship	And over 10,000 tons designated displacement
21 March 1898	Warships		Battleship	2nd class battleship	Less than 10,000 tons designated displacement
22 June 1900	Naval Vessels	Warships	Battleship	1st class battleship	Same as on 21 March 1898
22 June 1900	Naval Vessels	Warships	Battleship	2nd class battleship	Same as on 21 March 1898
12 December 1905	Naval vessels	Warships	Battleship		'Class' was abolished

=== Battlecruiser ===
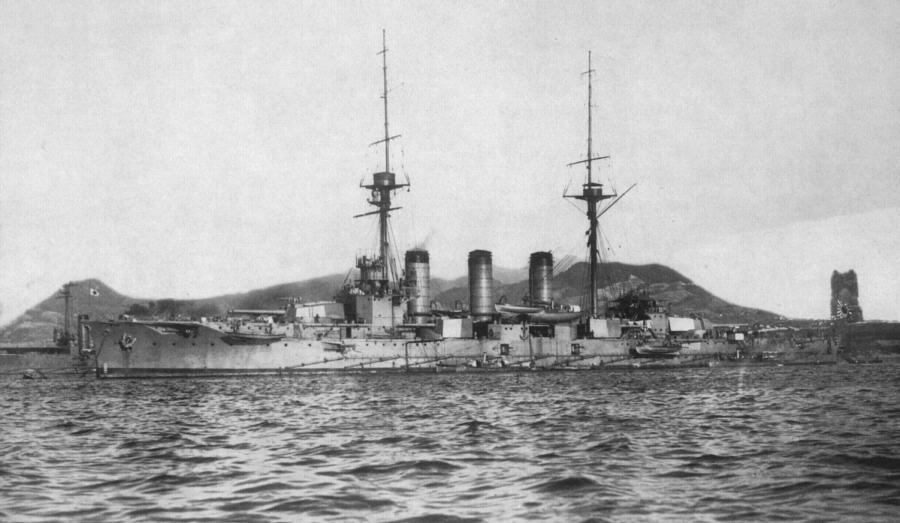
Battlecruiser Ibuki

Date	Top classification	Higher classification	Classification	Lower classification	Note, classification boundary
28 August 1912	Naval Vessels	Warships	Battlecruiser		
30 May 1931					Abolished and unified to battleship

=== Cruiser ===
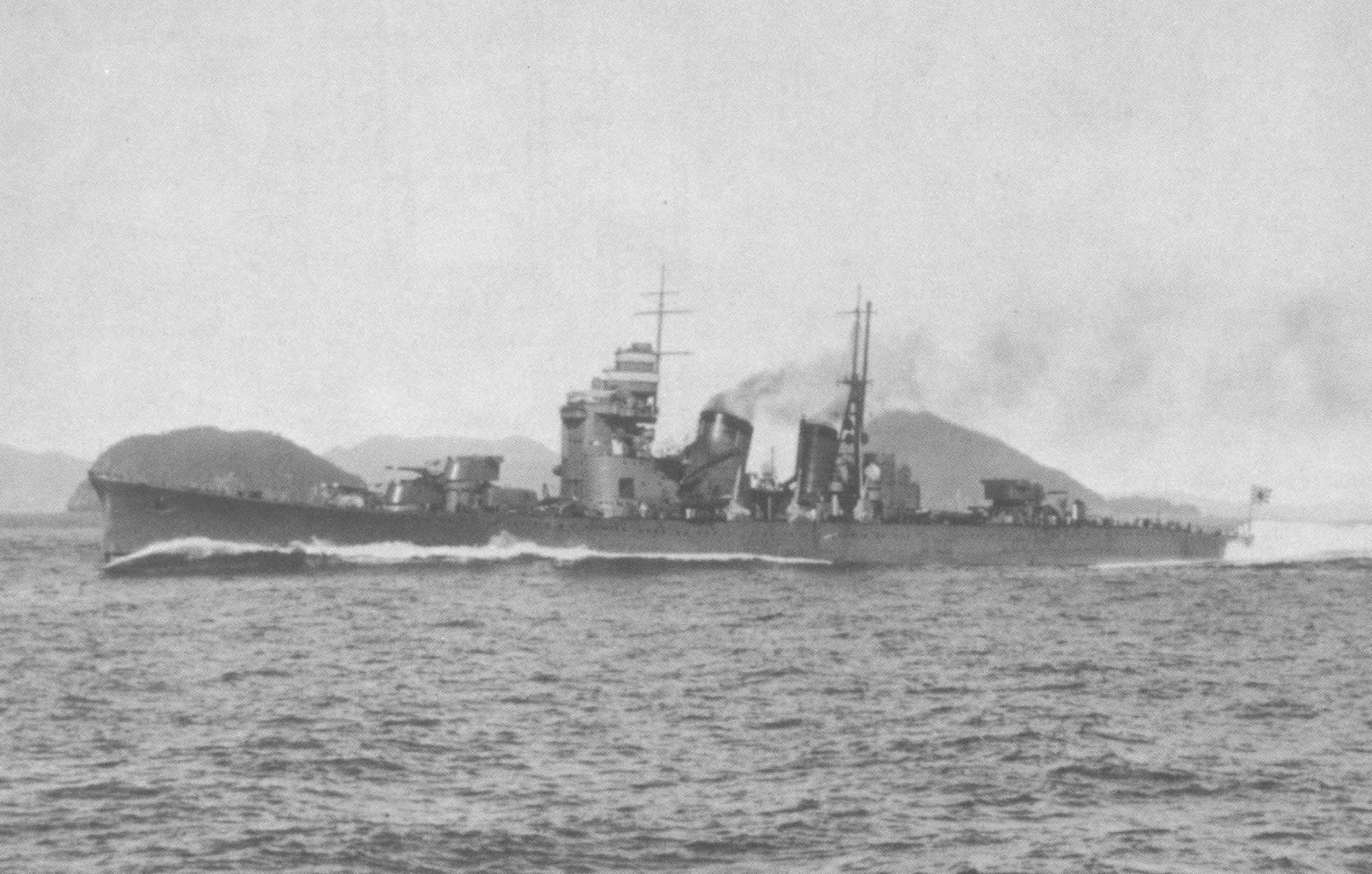
1st class cruiser Nachi

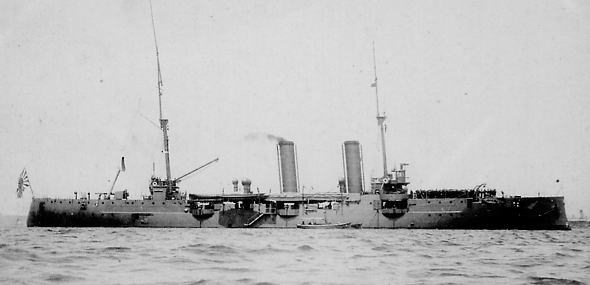
3rd class cruiser Suma

Date	Top classification	Higher classification	Classification	Lower classification	Note, classification boundary
21 March 1898	Warships		Cruiser	1st class cruiser	And over 7,000 tons designated displacement
21 March 1898	Warships		Cruiser	2nd class cruiser	And over 3,500 tons designated displacement, less than 7,000 tons designated displacement
21 March 1898	Warships		Cruiser	3rd class cruiser	Less than 3,500 tons designated displacement
22 June 1900	Naval Vessels	Warships	Cruiser	1st class cruiser	Same as on 21 March 1898
22 June 1900	Naval Vessels	Warships	Cruiser	2nd class cruiser	Same as on 21 March 1898
22 June 1900	Naval Vessels	Warships	Cruiser	3rd class cruiser	Same as on 21 March 1898
28 August 1912	Naval vessels	Warships	Cruiser	1st class cruiser	And over 7,000 tons designated displacement
28 August 1912	Naval vessels	Warships	Cruiser	2nd class cruiser	Less than 7,000 tons designated displacement, '3rd class' was abolished.
31 May 1934	Naval vessels	Warships	Cruiser	1st class cruiser	Equipped over 155 mm (6.1 in) gun
31 May 1934	Naval vessels	Warships	Cruiser	2nd class cruiser	Equipped and under 155 mm (6.1 in) gun

=== Aircraft carrier ===
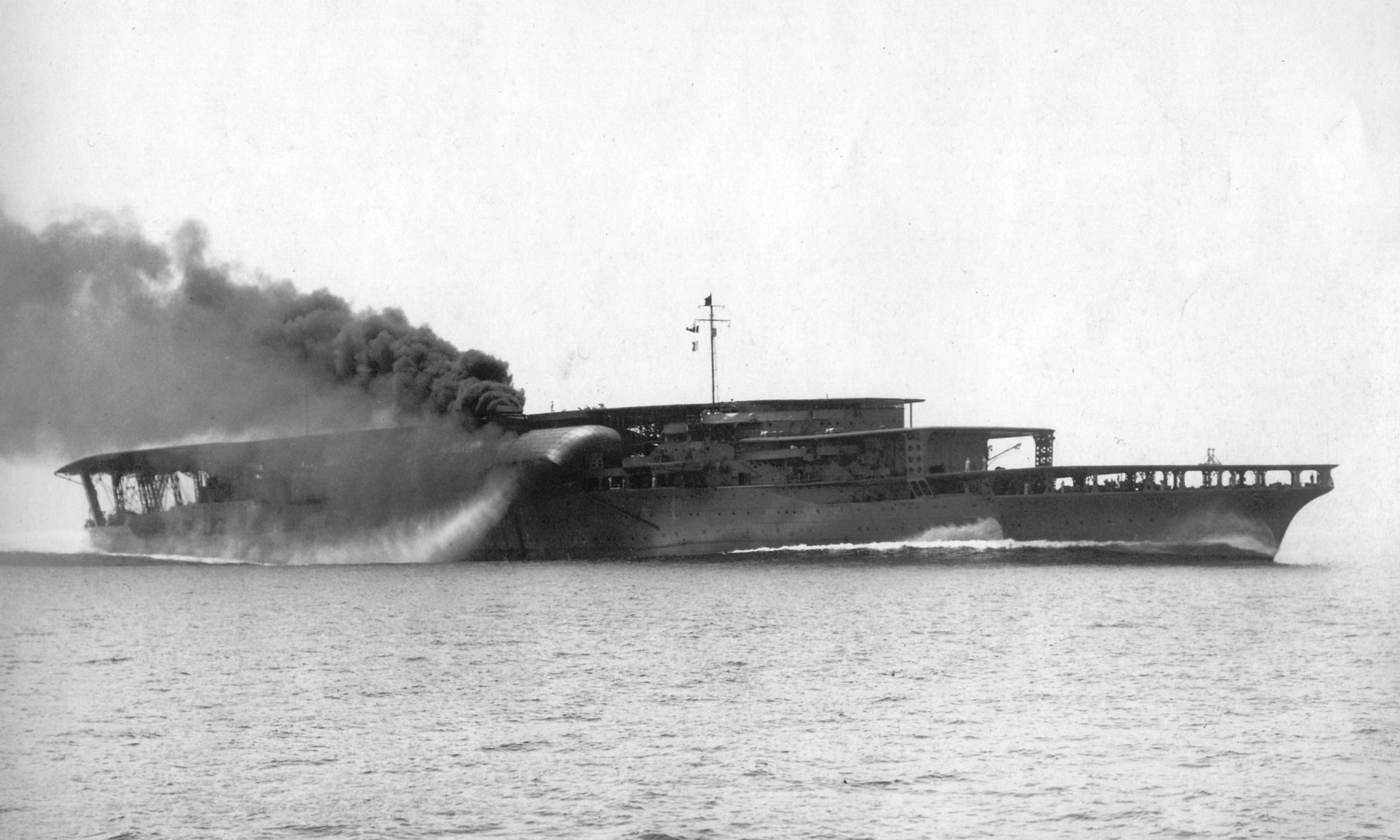
Aircraft carrier Akagi

Date	Top classification	Higher classification	Classification	Lower classification	Note, classification boundary
1 April 1920	Naval Vessels	Warships	Aircraft carrier		

=== Seaplane tender ===
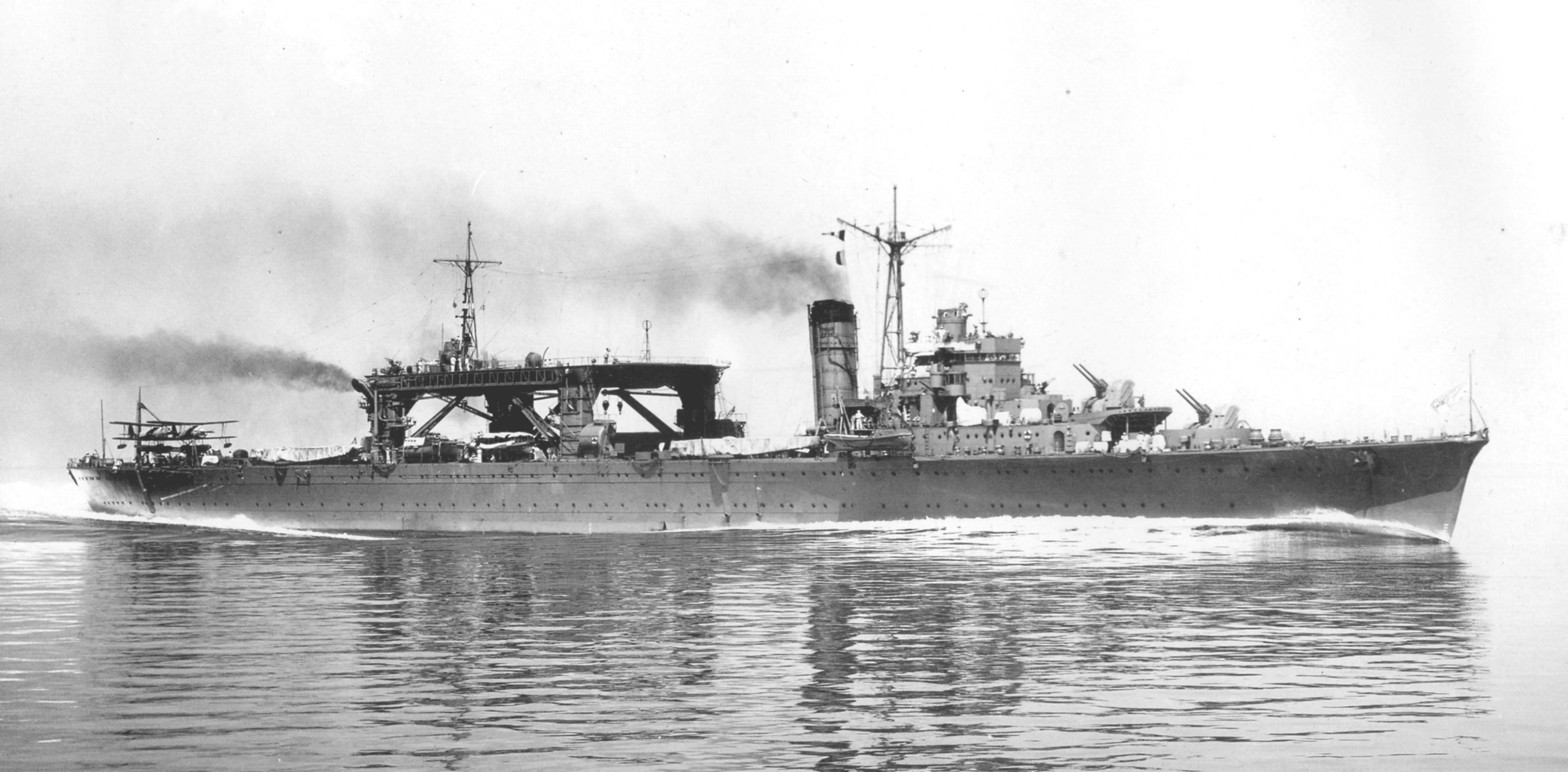
Seaplane tender Chitose

Date	Top classification	Higher classification	Classification	Lower classification	Note, classification boundary
31 May 1934	Naval Vessels	Warships	Seaplane tender		Independent from aircraft carrier

=== Dispatch vessel ===
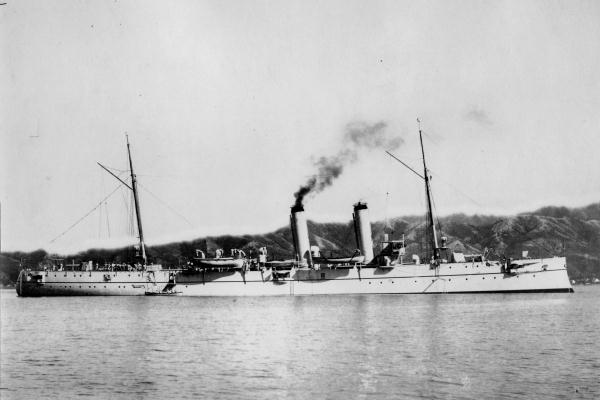
Dispatch vessel Miyako

Date	Top classification	Higher classification	Classification	Lower classification	Note, classification boundary
21 March 1898	Warships		Dispatch vessel		Torpedo gunboat was classified to dispatch boat
22 June 1900	Naval vessels	Warships	Dispatch vessel		
28 August 1912					Abolished and unified to gunboat

=== Torpedo boat tender/Submarine tender ===
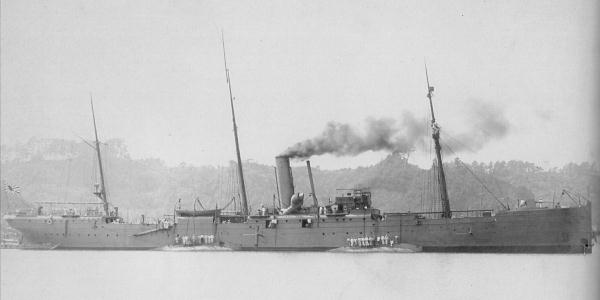
Torpedo boat tender Toyohashi

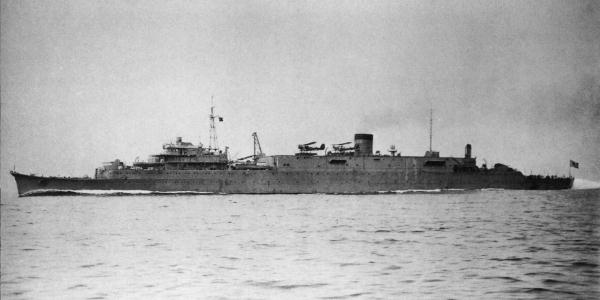
Submarine tender Tsurugizaki

Date	Top classification	Higher classification	Classification	Lower classification	Note, classification boundary
21 March 1898	Warships		Torpedo boat tender		
22 June 1900	Naval vessels	Warships	Torpedo boat tender		
28 August 1912					Abolished and unified to coast defence ship
1 April 1920	Naval vessels	Warships	Torpedo boat tender		Revived
1 December 1924	Naval vessels	Warships	Submarine tender		Renamed

=== Minelaying ship/Minelayer/Rapid extension netlayer ===
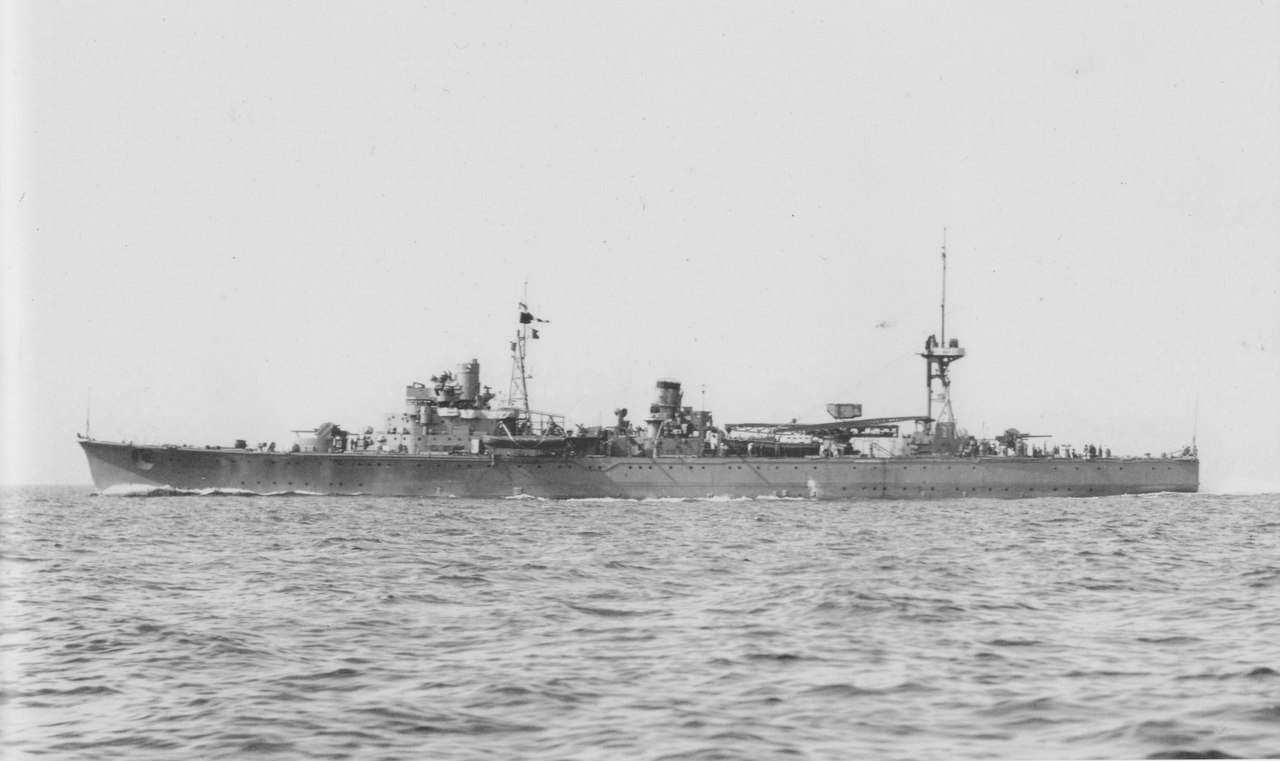
Minelayer Tsugaru

- Note; pertinence of rapid extension netlayer was only Shirataka.

Date	Top classification	Higher classification	Classification	Lower classification	Note, classification boundary
17 May 1916	Auxiliary ships		Minelaying ship		
1 April 1920	Naval vessels	Warships	Minelayer		Renamed
2 March 1927	Naval vessels	Warships	Minelayer		
2 March 1927	Naval vessels	Warships	Rapid extension netlayer		
22 March 1929	Naval vessels	Warships	Minelayer		Rapid extension netlayer was abolished, and unified to minelayer

=== Training battleship ===
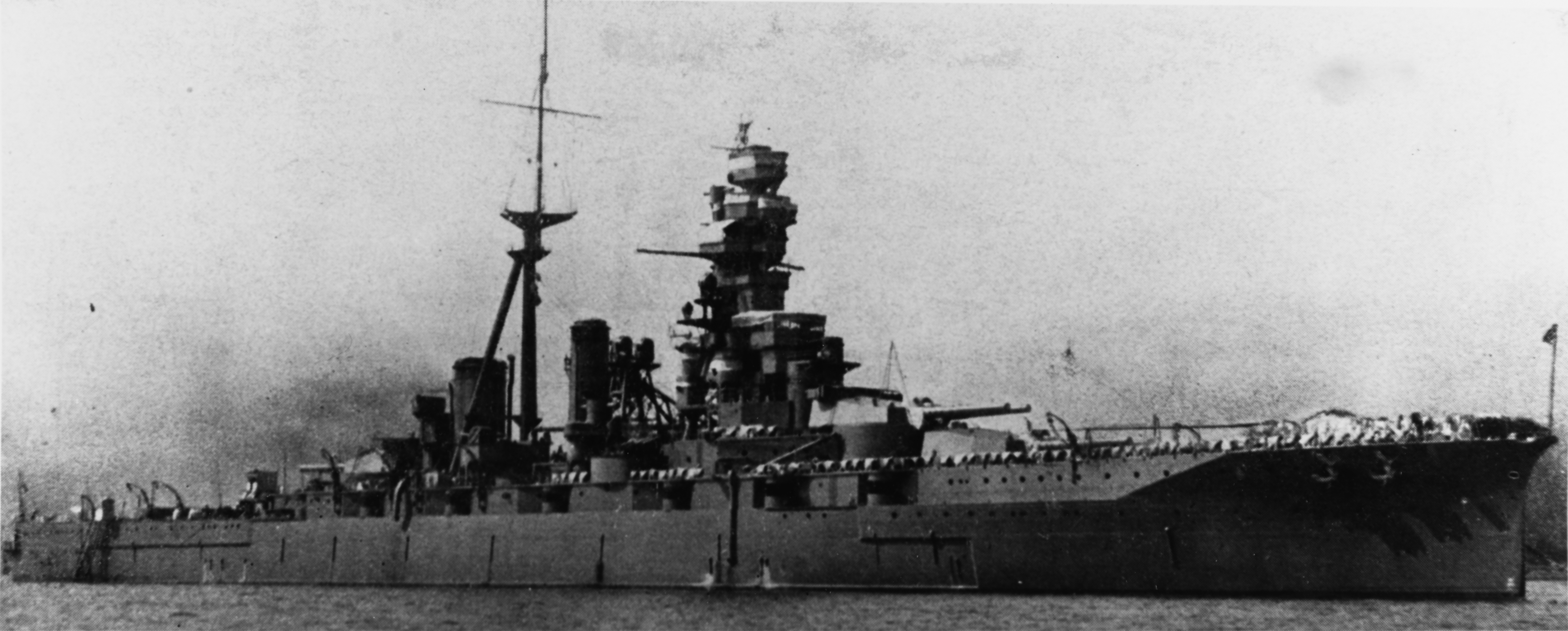
Training battleship Hiei

- Note; pertinence of training battleship was only Hiei. She does not return to battleship in the Imperial Japanese Navy's official documents.

Date	Top classification	Higher classification	Classification	Lower classification	Note, classification boundary
30 May 1931	Naval vessels	Warships	Training battleship		

=== Training cruiser ===
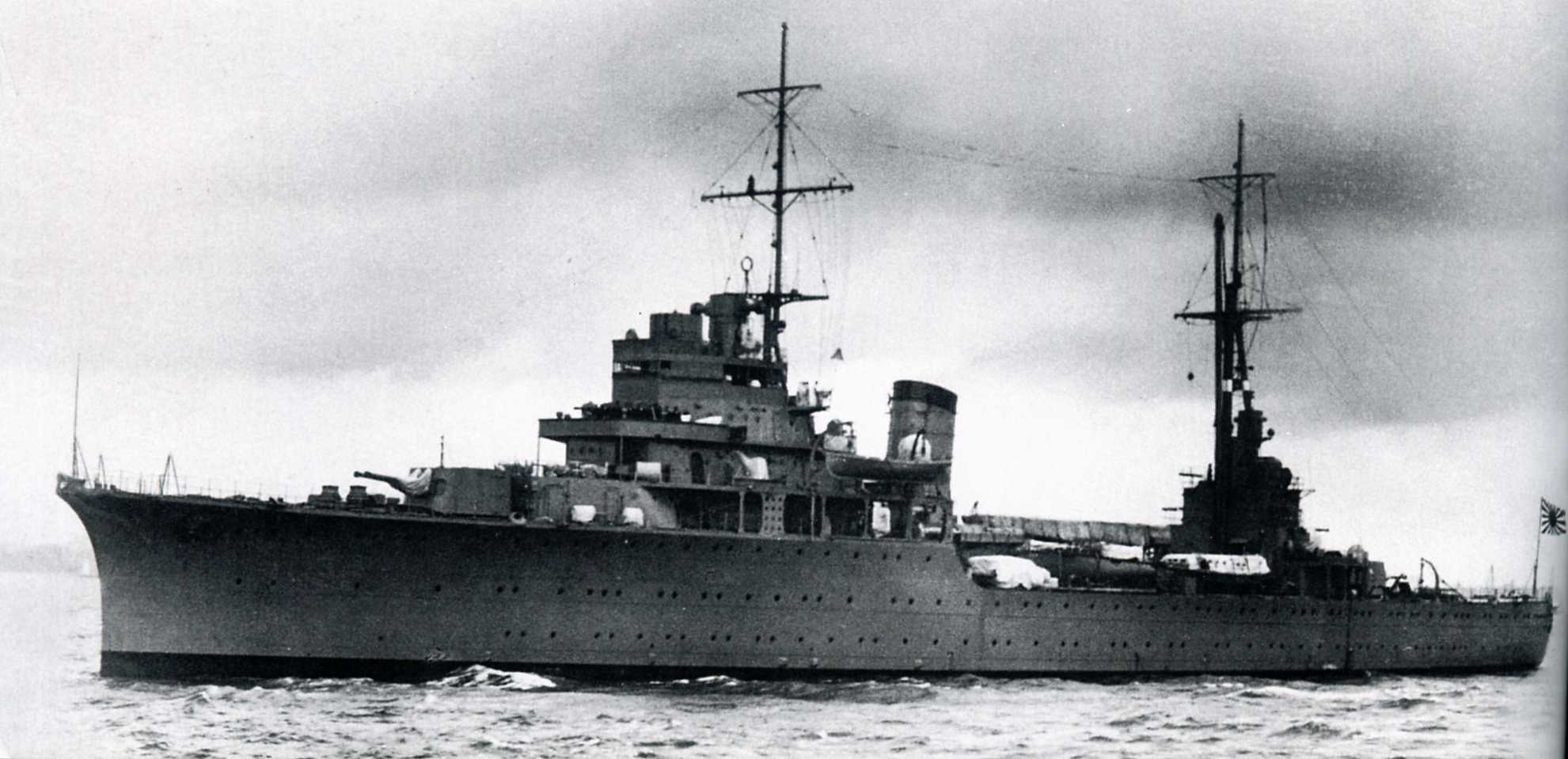
Training cruiser Katori

- Note; pertinence of training cruiser was only Katori class.

Date	Top classification	Higher classification	Classification	Lower classification	Note, classification boundary
30 May 1931	Naval vessels	Warships	Training cruiser		

=== Coast defence ship ===
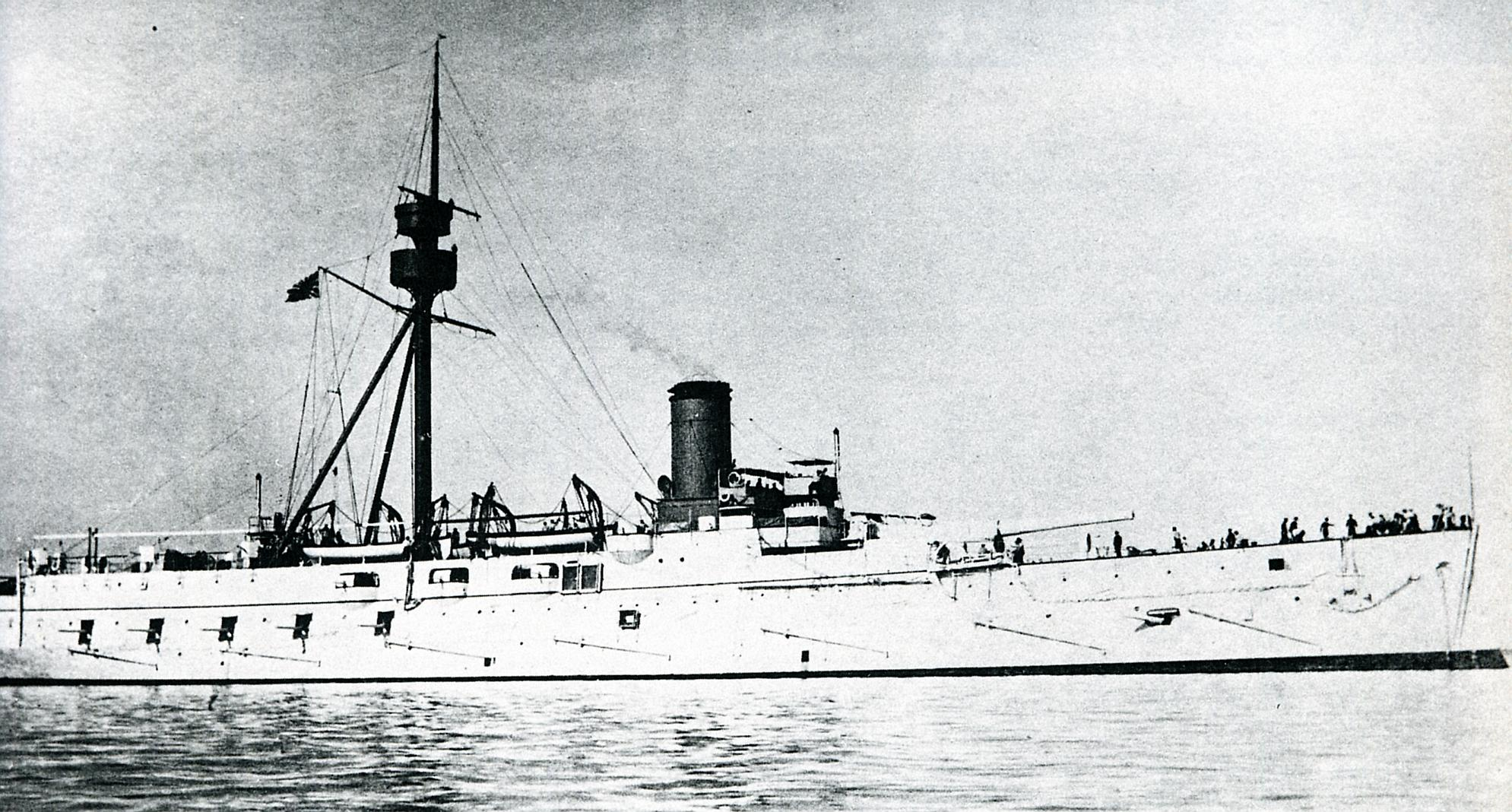
2nd class coast defence ship Itsukushima

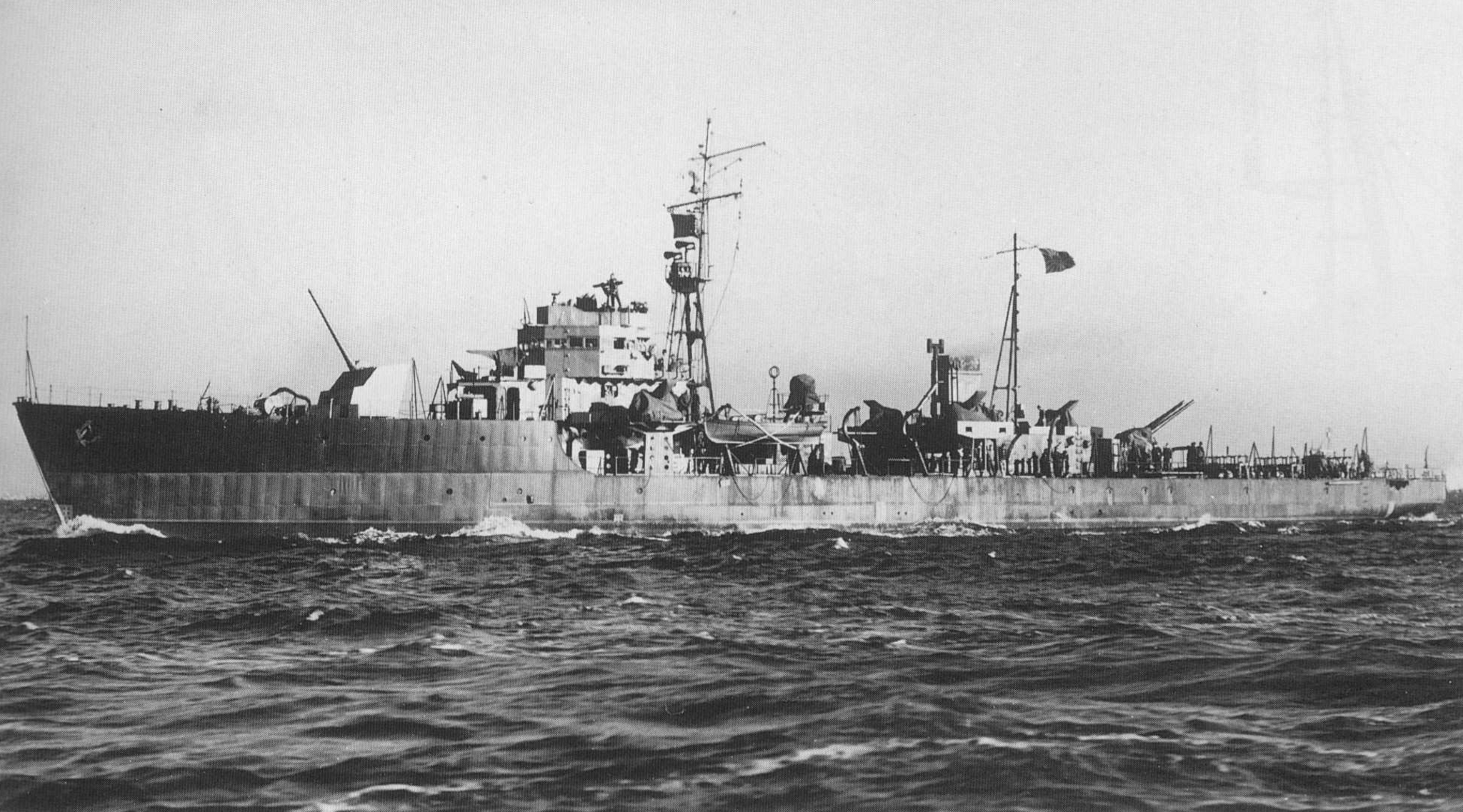
Coast defence ship Shisaka

Date	Top classification	Higher classification	Classification	Lower classification	Note, classification boundary
21 March 1898	Warships		Coast defence ship	1st class coast defence ship	And over 7,000 tons designated displacement
21 March 1898	Warships		Coast defence ship	2nd class coast defence ship	And over 3,500 tons designated displacement, less than 7,000 tons designated displacement
21 March 1898	Warships		Coast defence ship	3rd class coast defence ship	Less than 3,500 tons displacement
22 June 1900	Naval vessels	Warships	Coast defence ship	1st class coast defence ship	Same as on 21 March 1898
22 June 1900	Naval vessels	Warships	Coast defence ship	2nd class coast defence ship	Same as on 21 March 1898
22 June 1900	Naval vessels	Warships	Coast defence ship	3rd class coast defence ship	Same as on 21 March 1898
28 August 1912	Naval vessels	Warships	Coast defence ship	1st class coast defence ship	And over 7,000 tons designated displacement
28 August 1912	Naval vessels	Warships	Coast defence ship	2nd class coast defence ship	Less than 7,000 tons designated displacement
30 May 1931	Naval vessels	Warships	Coast defence ship		'Class' was abolished
1 July 1942	Naval vessels		Coast defence ship (as Escort ship)		Armored cruisers were moved to 1st class cruiser or auxiliary training ship

=== Gunboat ===
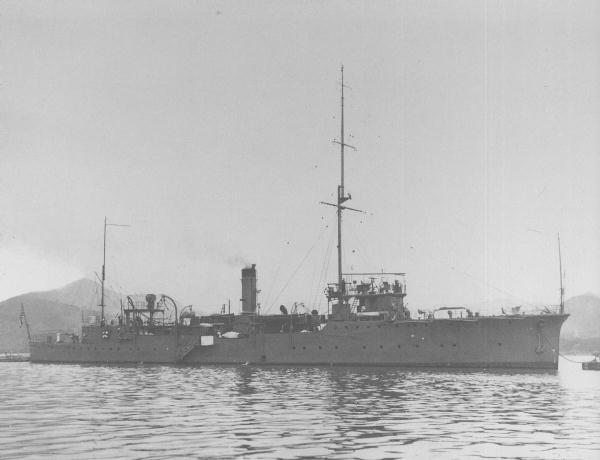
1st class gunboat Saga

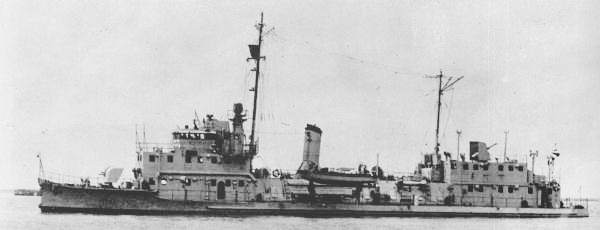
Gunboat Sumida

Date	Top classification	Higher classification	Classification	Lower classification	Note, classification boundary
21 March 1898	Warships		Gunboat	1st class gunboat	And over 1,000 tons designated displacement
21 March 1898	Warships		Gunboat	2nd class gunboat	Less than 1,000 tons designated displacement
22 June 1900	Naval vessels	Warships	Gunboat	1st class gunboat	Same as on 21 March 1898
22 June 1900	Naval vessels	Warships	Gunboat	2nd class gunboat	Same as on 21 March 1898
28 August 1912	Naval vessels	Warships	Gunboat	1st class gunboat	And over 800 tons displacement
28 August 1912	Naval vessels	Warships	Gunboat	2nd class gunboat	Less than 800 tons displacement
30 May 1931	Naval vessels	Warships	Gunboat		'Class' was abolished
1 October 1944	Naval vessels		Gunboat		

=== Torpedo boat destroyer/Destroyer ===
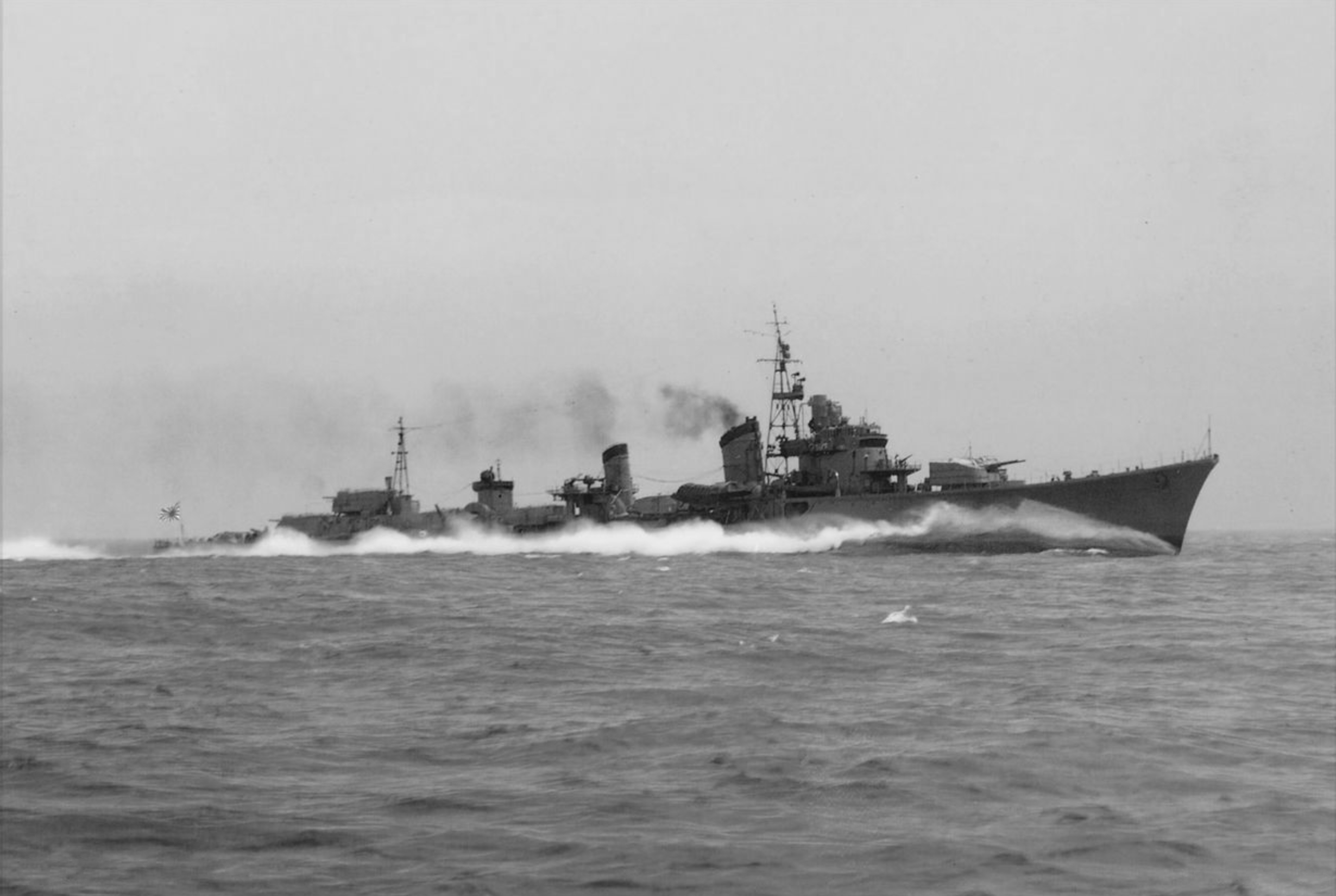
1st class destroyer Shimakaze

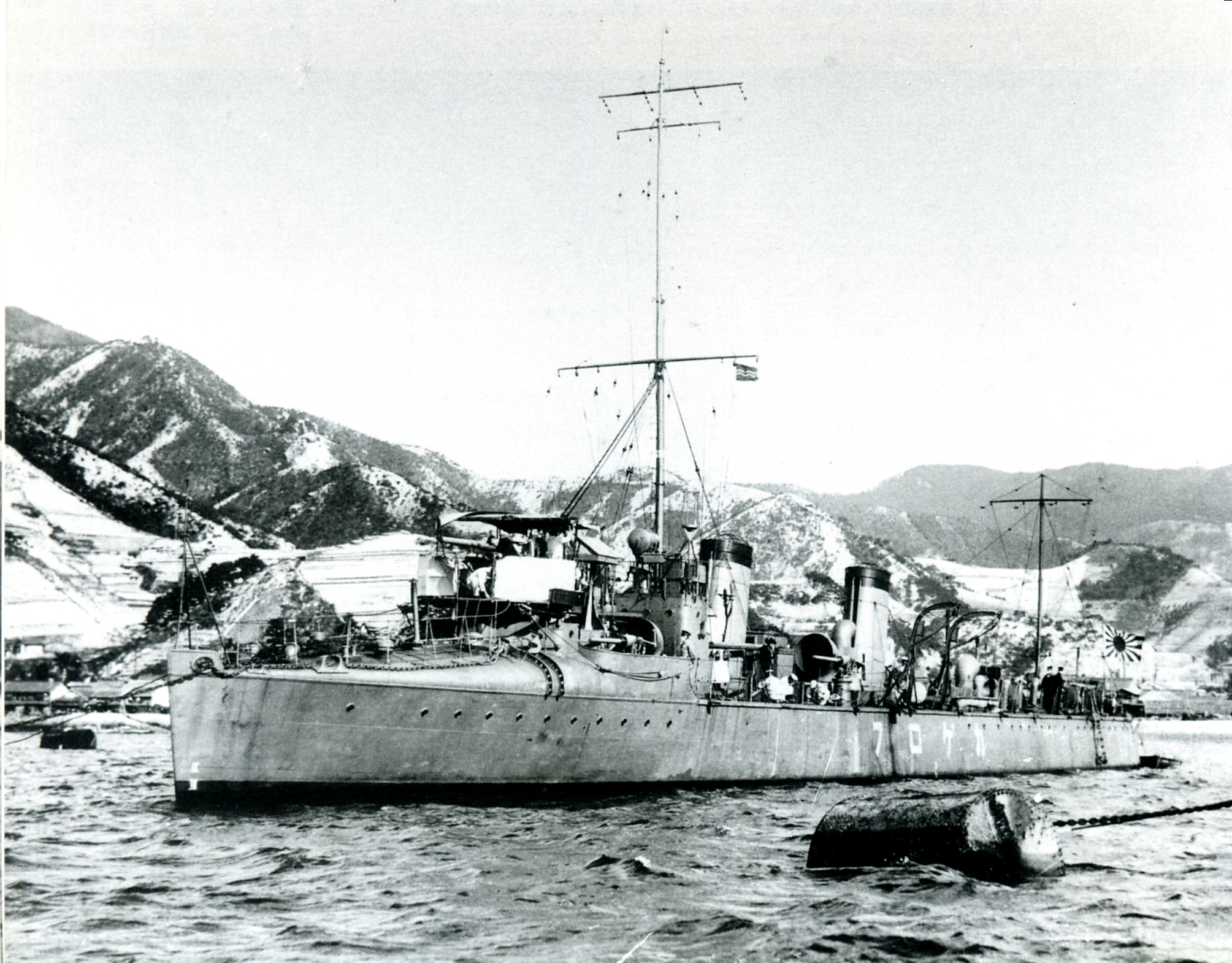
3rd class destroyer Kagerō

Date	Top classification	Higher classification	Classification	Lower classification	Note, classification boundary
21 March 1898	Torpedo boat		Torpedo boat destroyer		
22 June 1900	Naval vessels	Warships	Destroyer		Independent from torpedo boat and renamed
12 December 1905	Naval vessels		Destroyer		
28 August 1912	Naval vessels		Destroyer	1st class destroyer	And over 1,000 tons designated displacement
28 August 1912	Naval vessels		Destroyer	2nd class destroyer	And over 600 tons designated displacement, less than 1,000 tons designated displacement
28 August 1912	Naval vessels		Destroyer	3rd class destroyer	Less than 600 tons designated displacement
30 May 1931	Naval vessels		Destroyer	1st class destroyer	And over 1,000 tons designated displacement
30 May 1931	Naval vessels		Destroyer	2nd class destroyer	Less than 1,000 tons designated displacement, '3rd class' was abolished
31 May 1934	Naval vessels		Destroyer	1st class destroyer	And over 1,000 tons standard displacement
31 May 1934	Naval vessels		Destroyer	2nd class destroyer	Less than 1,000 tons standard displacement

=== Submersible/Submarine ===
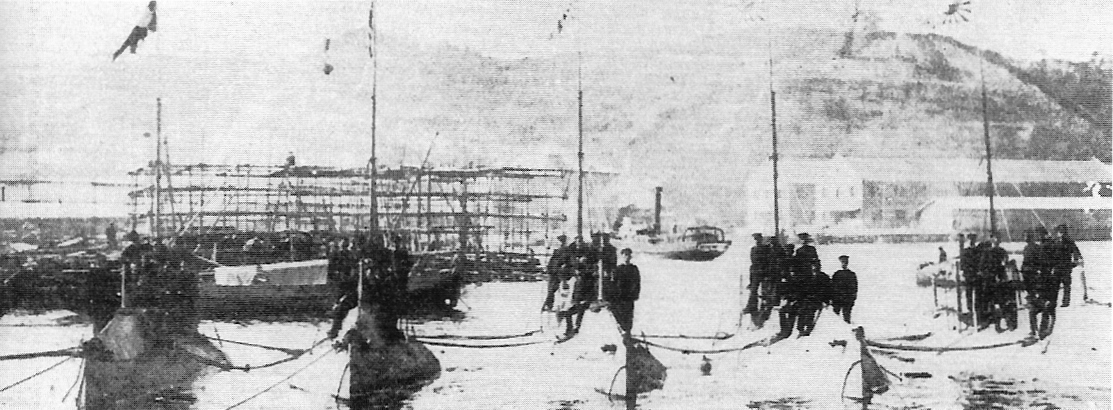
No. 1-class submersible

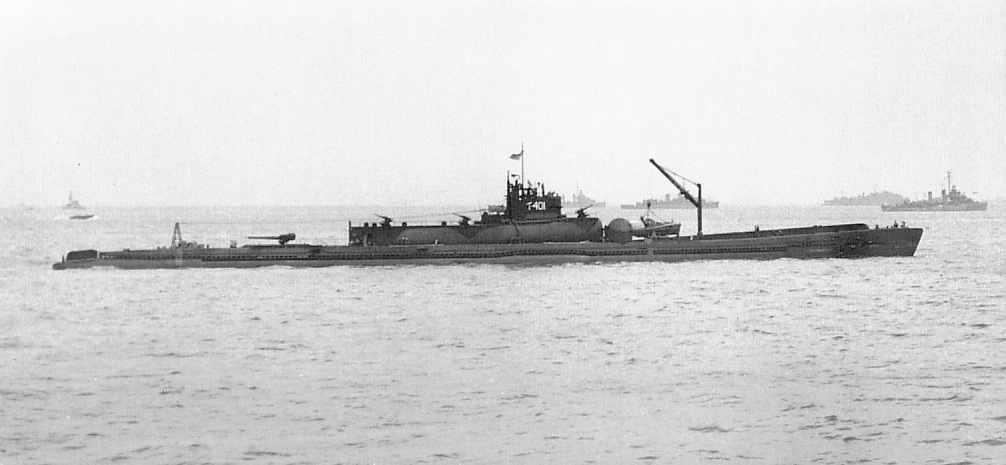
1st class submarine I-400

- Note; Kō-hyōteki, Kairyū and Kaiten were not included in this table, because they were weapons in the Imperial Japanese Navy's official documents.

Date	Top classification	Higher classification	Classification	Lower classification	Note, classification boundary
23 January 1905	Torpedo boat		Submersible		
12 December 1905	Naval vessels		Submersible		Independent from torpedo boat
28 August 1912	Naval vessels		Submersible	1st class submersible	And over 600 tons surfaced displacement
28 August 1912	Naval vessels		Submersible	2nd class submersible	Less than 600 tons surfaced displacement
4 April 1919	Naval vessels		Submarine	1st class submarine	Renamed; and over 1,000 tons surfaced displacement
4 April 1919	Naval vessels		Submarine	2nd class submarine	Renamed, and over 600 tons surfaced displacement, less than 1,000 tons surfaced displacement
4 April 1919	Naval vessels		Submarine	3rd class submarine	Less than 600 tons surfaced displacement
30 May 1931	Naval vessels		Submarine	1st class submarine	And over 1,000 tons surfaced displacement
30 May 1931	Naval vessels		Submarine	2nd class submarine	Less than 1,000 tons surfaced displacement, '3rd class' was abolished

=== Torpedo boat ===
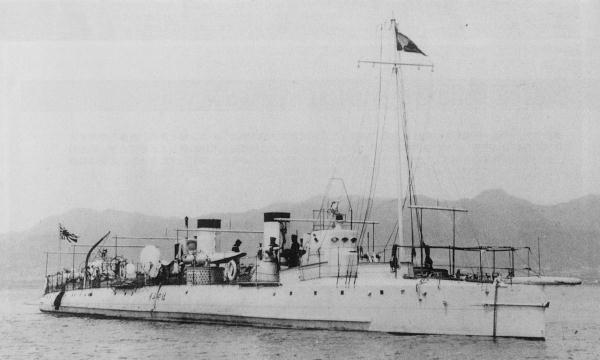
1st class torpedo boat Hayabusa

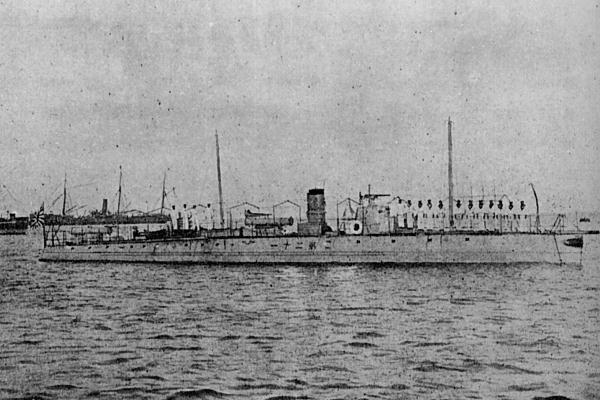
2nd class torpedo boat No. 21

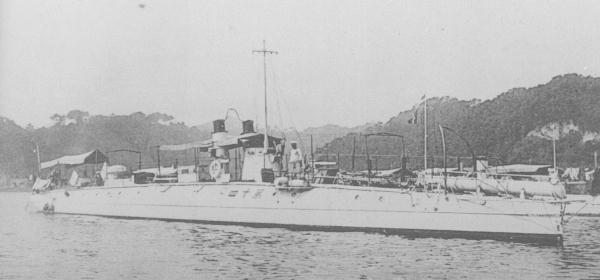
3rd class torpedo boat No. 14

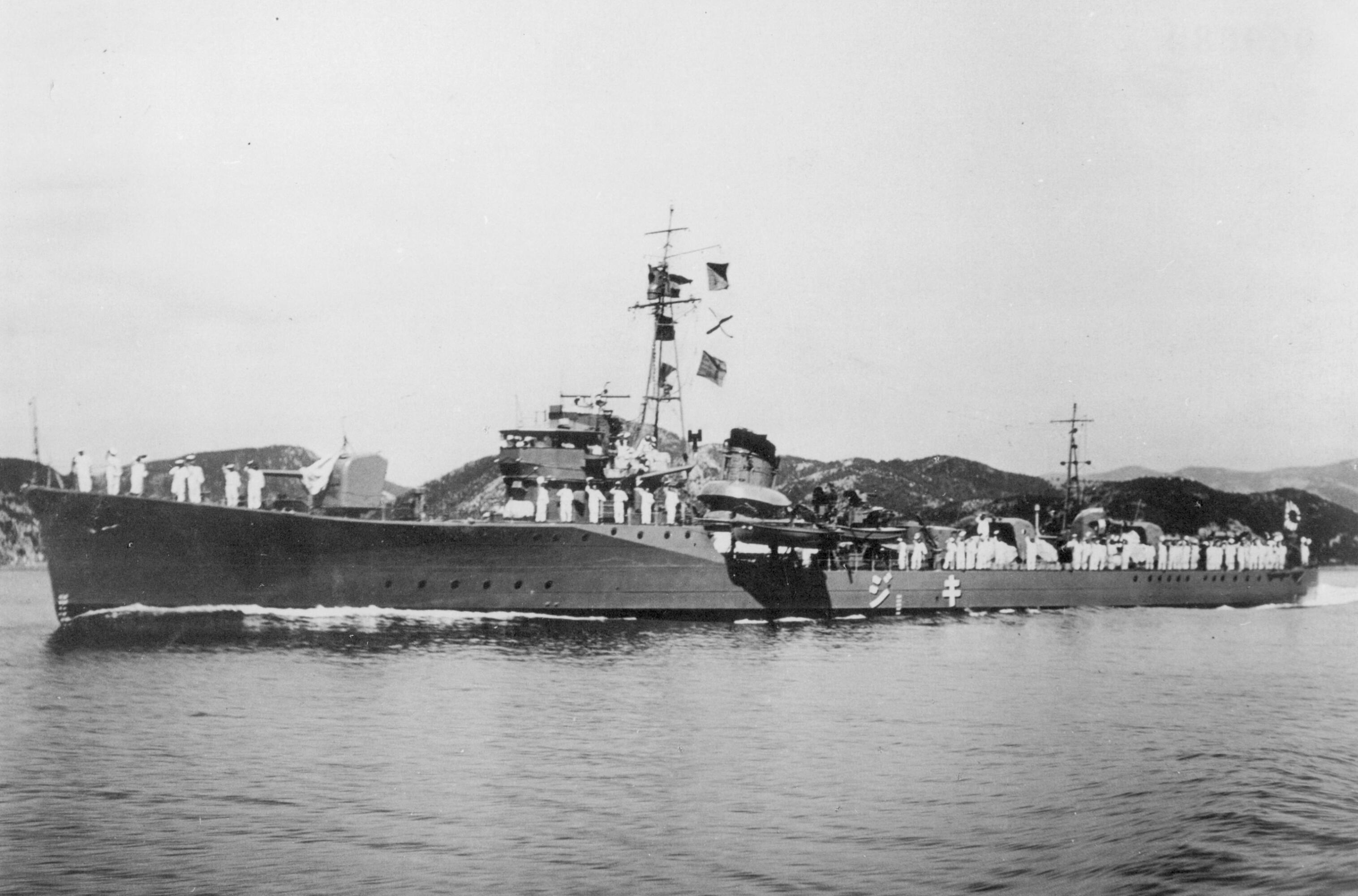
Torpedo boat Kiji

Date	Top classification	Higher classification	Classification	Lower classification	Note, classification boundary
13 August 1890	Naval ships	Category 'B' warship	Torpedo boat		
19 October 1893	Naval ships	Category 'B' warship	Torpedo boat	1st class torpedo boat	And over 70 tons displacement
19 October 1893	Naval ships	Category 'B' warship	Torpedo boat	2nd class torpedo boat	And over 20 tons designated displacement, less than 70 tons designated displacement
19 October 1893	Naval ships	Category 'B' warship	Torpedo boat	3rd class torpedo boat	Less than 20 tons designated displacement (vedette boat)
28 March 1896	Naval ships		Torpedo boat	1st class torpedo boat	Same as on 19 October 1893
28 March 1896	Naval ships		Torpedo boat	2nd class torpedo boat	Same as on 19 October 1893
28 March 1896	Naval ships		Torpedo boat	3rd class torpedo boat	Same as on 19 October 1893
21 March 1898			Torpedo boat	Torpedo boat destroyer	
21 March 1898			Torpedo boat	1st class torpedo boat	And over 120 tons designated displacement
21 March 1898			Torpedo boat	2nd class torpedo boat	And over 70 tons designated displacement, less than 120 tons designated displacement
21 March 1898			Torpedo boat	3rd class torpedo boat	And over 20 tons designated displacement, less than 70 tons designated displacement
21 March 1898			Torpedo boat	4th class torpedo boat	Less than 20 tons designated displacement (vedette boat)
22 June 1900	Naval vessels		Torpedo boat	1st class torpedo boat	Same as on 21 March 1898; Torpedo boat destroyer was independent from torpedo boat, and renamed destroyer.
22 June 1900	Naval vessels		Torpedo boat	2nd class torpedo boat	Same as on 21 March 1898; Torpedo boat destroyer was independent from torpedo boat, and renamed destroyer.
22 June 1900	Naval vessels		Torpedo boat	3rd class torpedo boat	Same as on 21 March 1898; Torpedo boat destroyer was independent from torpedo boat, and renamed destroyer.
22 June 1900	Naval vessels		Torpedo boat	4th class torpedo boat	Same as on 21 March 1898; Torpedo boat destroyer was independent from torpedo boat, and renamed destroyer.
23 January 1905	Naval vessels		Torpedo boat	1st class torpedo boat	Same as on 21 March 1898
23 January 1905	Naval vessels		Torpedo boat	2nd class torpedo boat	Same as on 21 March 1898
23 January 1905	Naval vessels		Torpedo boat	3rd class torpedo boat	Same as on 21 March 1898
23 January 1905	Naval vessels		Torpedo boat	4th class torpedo boat	Same as on 21 March 1898
23 January 1905	Naval vessels		Torpedo boat	Submersible	IJN called Special-Torpedo boat (特号水雷艇, Tokugō-Suiraitei) for counterintelligence
12 December 1905	Naval vessels		Torpedo boat	1st class torpedo boat	Same as on 21 March 1898; Submersible was independent from torpedo boat.
12 December 1905	Naval vessels		Torpedo boat	2nd class torpedo boat	Same as on 21 March 1898; Submersible was independent from torpedo boat.
12 December 1905	Naval vessels		Torpedo boat	3rd class torpedo boat	Same as on 21 March 1898; Submersible was independent from torpedo boat.
12 December 1905	Naval vessels		Torpedo boat	4th class torpedo boat	Same as on 21 March 1898; Submersible was independent from torpedo boat.
28 August 1912	Naval vessels		Torpedo boat	1st class torpedo boat	And over 120 tons designated displacement
28 August 1912	Naval vessels		Torpedo boat	2nd class torpedo boat	Less than 120 tons designated displacement
15 January 1924					Abolished
30 May 1931	Naval vessels		Torpedo boat		Revived by the London Naval Treaty

=== Mine boat/Capture-net layer ===
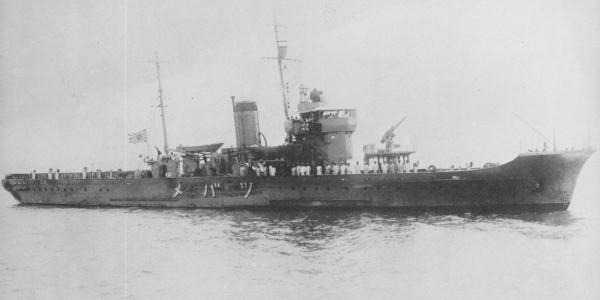
2nd class mine boat Tsubame

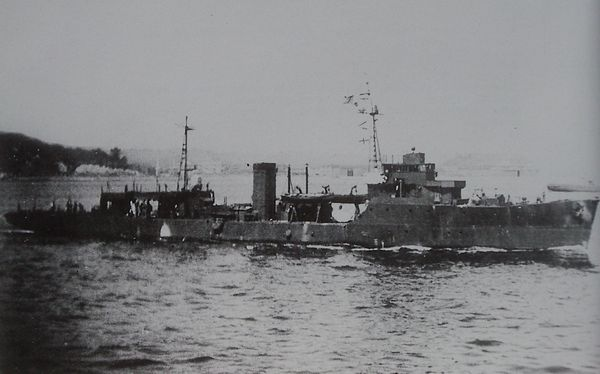
Mine boat Kamishima

- Note; pertinence of capture net layer was only Tsubame class.

Date	Top classification	Higher classification	Classification	Lower classification	Note, classification boundary
1 July 1920	Auxiliary vessels	Auxiliary boat	Mine boat	1st class mine boat	And over 800 tons displacement
1 July 1920	Auxiliary vessels	Auxiliary boat	Mine boat	2nd class mine boat	And over 400 tons designated displacement, less than 800 tons designated displacement
1 July 1920	Auxiliary vessels	Auxiliary boat	Mine boat	3rd class mine boat	Less than 400 tons designated displacement
2 March 1927	Auxiliary vessels	Auxiliary boat	Mine boat	1st class mine boat	Same as on 1 July 1920
2 March 1927	Auxiliary vessels	Auxiliary boat	Mine boat	2nd class mine boat	Same as on 1 July 1920
2 March 1927	Auxiliary vessels	Auxiliary boat	Mine boat	3rd class mine boat	Same as on 1 July 1920
2 March 1927	Auxiliary vessels	Auxiliary boat	Capture-net layer		
22 March 1929	Auxiliary vessels	Auxiliary boat	Mine boat	1st class mine boat	Same as on 1 July 1920; capture-net layer was abolished and unified to mine boat
22 March 1929	Auxiliary vessels	Auxiliary boat	Mine boat	2nd class mine boat	Same as on 1 July 1920; capture-net layer was abolished and unified to mine boat
22 March 1929	Auxiliary vessels	Auxiliary boat	Mine boat	3rd class mine boat	Same as on 1 July 1920; capture-net layer was abolished and unified to mine boat
30 May 1931	Auxiliary vessels	Auxiliary boat	Mine boat		'Class' was abolished
1 February 1944	Naval vessels		Mine boat		

=== Auxiliary minelayer ===
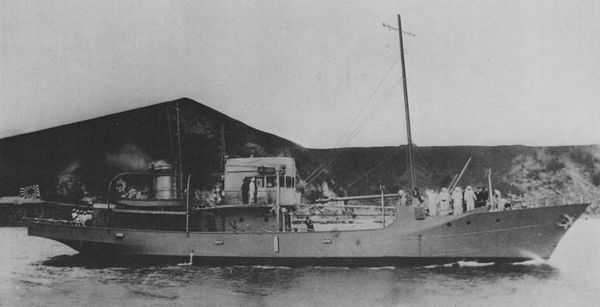
Auxiliary minelayer No. 1

Date	Top classification	Higher classification	Classification	Lower classification	Note, classification boundary
1 February 1944	Auxiliary vessels	Auxiliary boat	Auxiliary minelayer		Divided from mine boat

=== Cable layer ===
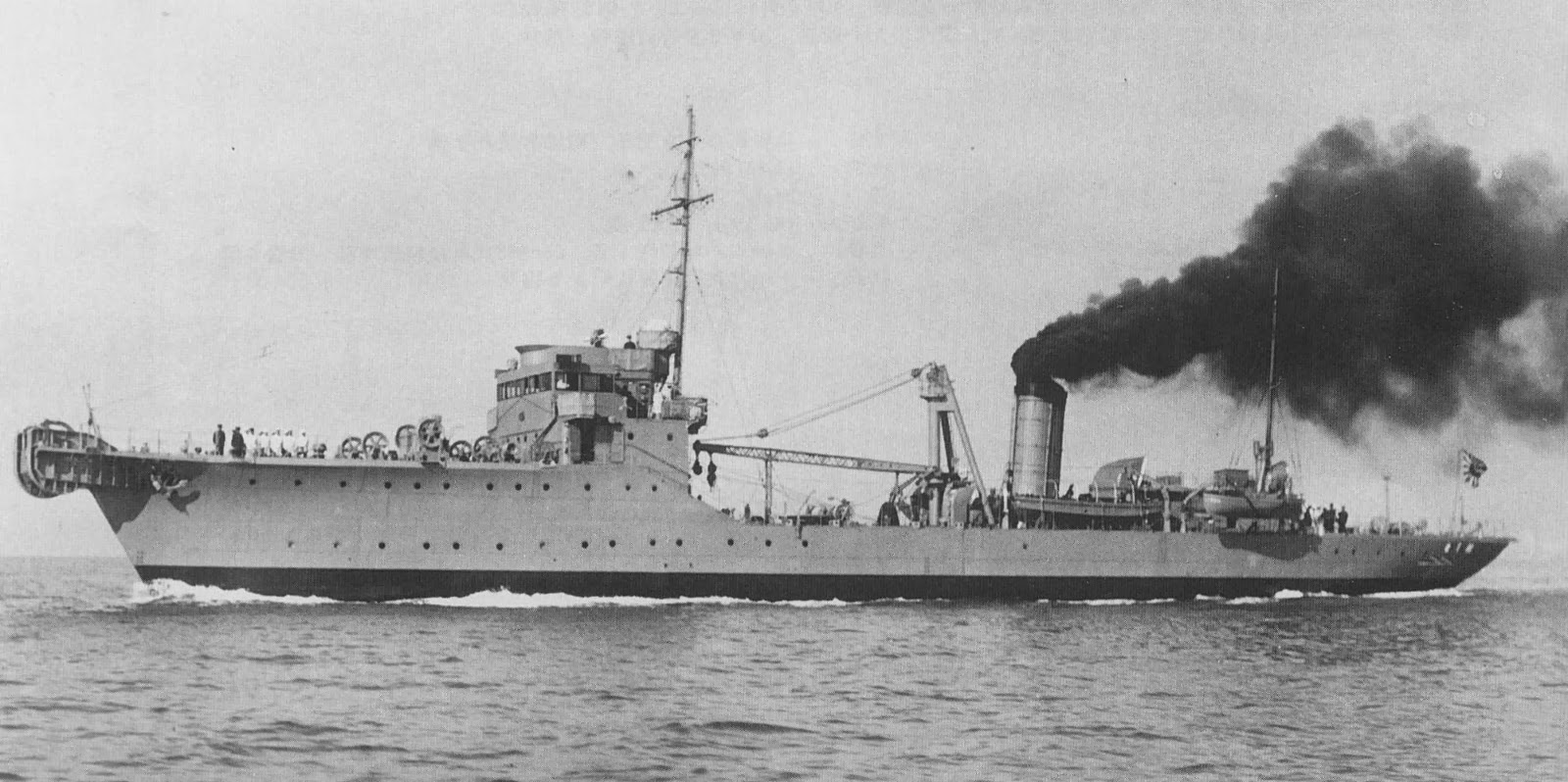
Cable layer Hashima

- Note; pertinence of cable layer was only Hashima class.

Date	Top classification	Higher classification	Classification	Lower classification	Note, classification boundary
25 October 1940	Auxiliary vessels	Auxiliary boat	Cable layer		Independent from miscellaneous ship

=== Minesweeper ===
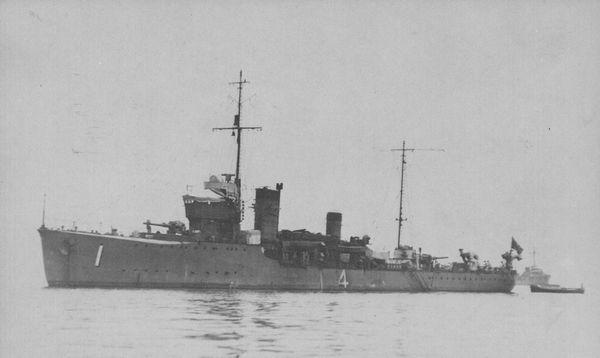
Minesweeper No. 4

Date	Top classification	Higher classification	Classification	Lower classification	Note, classification boundary
1 April 1920	Auxiliary vessels	Auxiliary boat	Minesweeper	1st class minesweeper	And over 500 tons designated displacement
1 April 1920	Auxiliary vessels	Auxiliary boat	Minesweeper	2nd class minesweeper	Less than 500 tons designated displacement
30 June 1923	Naval vessels		Minesweeper		'Class' was abolished

=== Auxiliary minesweeper ===
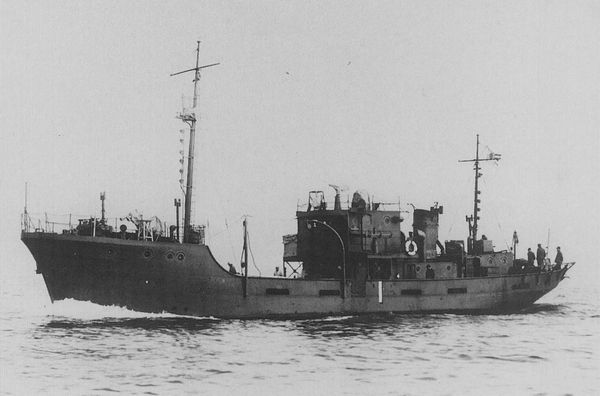
Auxiliary minesweeper No. 1

Date	Top classification	Higher classification	Classification	Lower classification	Note, classification boundary
30 June 1923	Auxiliary vessels	Auxiliary boat	Auxiliary minesweeper	1st class auxiliary minesweeper	And over 500 tons designated displacement
30 June 1923	Auxiliary vessels	Auxiliary boat	Auxiliary minesweeper	2nd class auxiliary minesweeper	Less than 500 tons designated displacement
30 May 1931	Auxiliary vessels	Auxiliary boat	Auxiliary minesweeper		'Class' was abolished

=== Submarine chaser ===
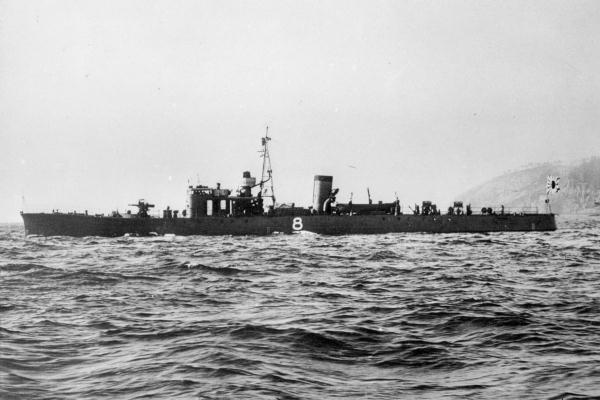
Submarine chaser No. 8

Date	Top classification	Higher classification	Classification	Lower classification	Note, classification boundary
23 May 1933	Auxiliary vessels	Auxiliary boat	Submarine chaser		
1 April 1940	Naval vessels		Submarine chaser		

=== Auxiliary submarine chaser ===
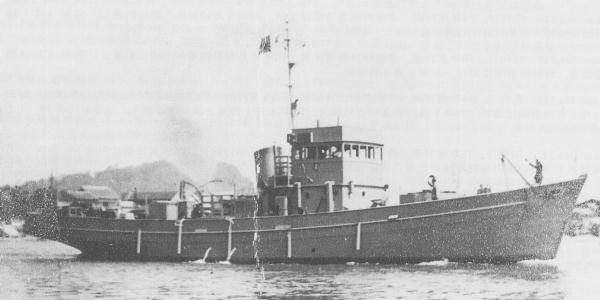
Auxiliary submarine chaser No. 1 class

Date	Top classification	Higher classification	Classification	Lower classification	Note, classification boundary
1 April 1940	Auxiliary vessels	Auxiliary boat	Auxiliary submarine chaser		Divided from submarine chaser

=== Patrol boat ===
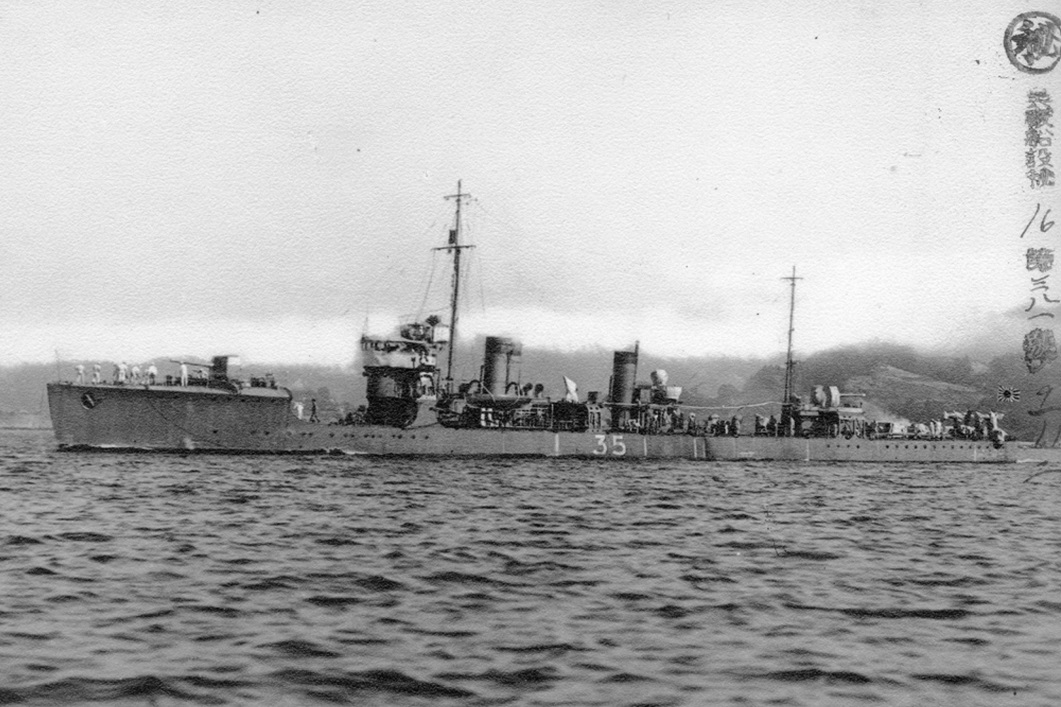
Patrol boat No. 35

Date	Top classification	Higher classification	Classification	Lower classification	Note, classification boundary
30 March 1940	Auxiliary vessels	Auxiliary boat	Patrol boat		
15 February 1943	Naval vessels		Patrol boat		

=== Auxiliary patrol boat ===
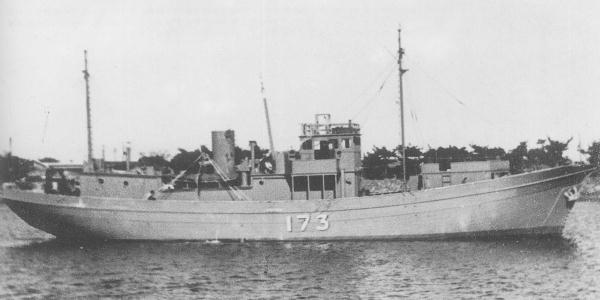
Auxiliary patrol boat No. 173

Date	Top classification	Higher classification	Classification	Lower classification	Note, classification boundary
15 February 1943	Auxiliary vessels	Auxiliary boat	Auxiliary patrol boat		Divided from patrol boat

=== Landing ship ===
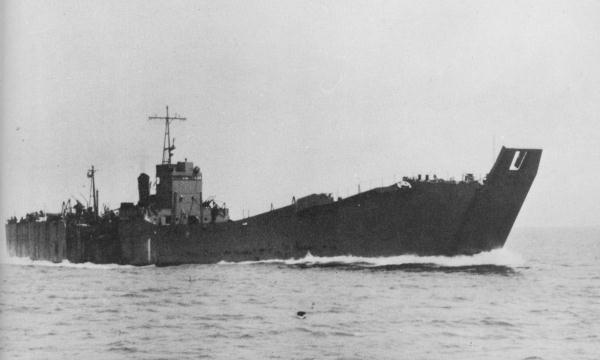
2nd class landing ship No. 151

- Note 1; pertinence of 1st class landing ship was only No.1 class.
- Note 2; pertinence of 2nd class landing ship was only No.101 class.

Date	Top classification	Higher classification	Classification	Lower classification	Note, classification boundary
5 February 1944	Naval vessels		Landing ship	1st class landing ship	And over 1,000 tons displacement
5 February 1944	Naval vessels		Landing ship	2nd class landing ship	Less than 1,000 tons designated displacement

=== Motor torpedo boat ===
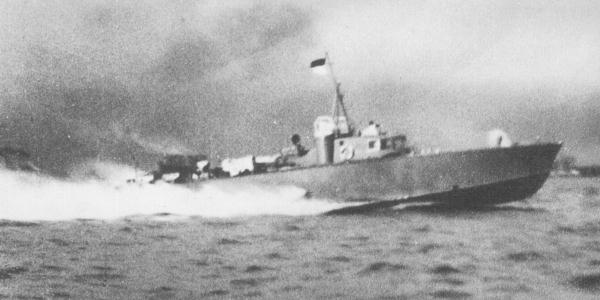
Motor torpedo boat No. 2

Date	Top classification	Higher classification	Classification	Lower classification	Note, classification boundary
30 June 1941	Auxiliary vessels	Auxiliary boat	Motor torpedo boat		Independent from miscellaneous ship

=== Coast defence boat ===
- Note; there is not a ship classed on this table. All No.1-class and No.101-class vessels were incomplete.

Date	Top classification	Higher classification	Classification	Lower classification	Note, classification boundary
30 June 1945	Auxiliary vessels	Auxiliary boat	Coast defence boat		

=== Repair ship/Repair vessel ===
Date	Top classification	Higher classification	Classification	Lower classification	Note, classification boundary
12 December 1905			Repair ship		
17 May 1916	Auxiliary ships		Repair ship		
1 April 1920	Auxiliary vessels	Auxiliary vessel	Repair vessel		Renamed, small sized repair ships were moved to miscellaneous ship

=== Transport vessel/Transport ship ===
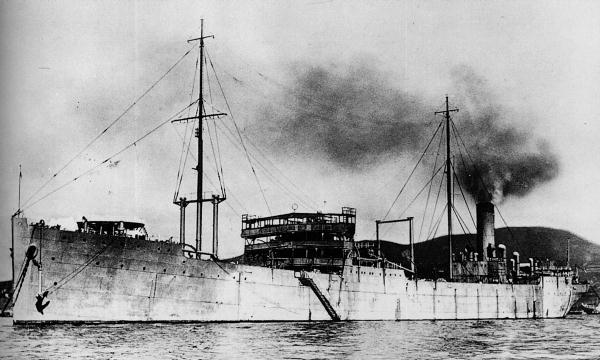
Transport vessel (Oiler) Hayatomo

- Note; Included replenishment oiler (給油船/給油艦, Kyūyusen/Kyūyukan), collier (給炭船/給炭艦, Kyūtansen/Kyūtankan), collier-oiler (給炭油艦, Kyūtan'yukan), munition ship (給兵艦, Kyūheikan), food supply ship (給糧艦, Kyūryōkan) and freighter (雑用艦, Zatsuyōkan).

Date	Top classification	Higher classification	Classification	Lower classification	Note, classification boundary
5 October 1872	Transport vessel		4th class transport vessel		And over 800 tons displacement
5 October 1872	Transport vessel		5th class transport vessel		And over 500 tons displacement
5 October 1872	Transport vessel		6th class transport vessel		And over 200 tons displacement
5 October 1872	Transport vessel		7th class transport vessel		And under 200 tons displacement
13 August 1890	Vessels	Category 'D' warship	Transport ship		
1 April 1896	Vessels	Miscellaneous ships	Transport ship		
12 December 1905			Transport ship		Independent from miscellaneous ships
17 May 1916	Auxiliary ships		Transport ship		
1 April 1920	Auxiliary vessels	Auxiliary vessel	Transport vessel		

=== Hospital ship ===
- Note; there is not a ship classed on this table.

Date	Top classification	Higher classification	Classification	Lower classification	Note, classification boundary
12 December 1905			Hospital ship		
17 May 1916					Abolished

=== Icebreaker ===
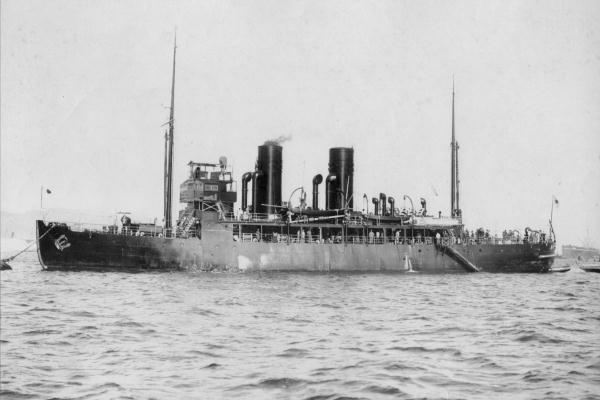
Icebreaker Ōtomari

- Note; pertinence of icebreaker was only Ōtomari.

Date	Top classification	Higher classification	Classification	Lower classification	Note, classification boundary
3 August 1921	Auxiliary vessels	Auxiliary vessel	Icebreaker		

=== Survey ship ===
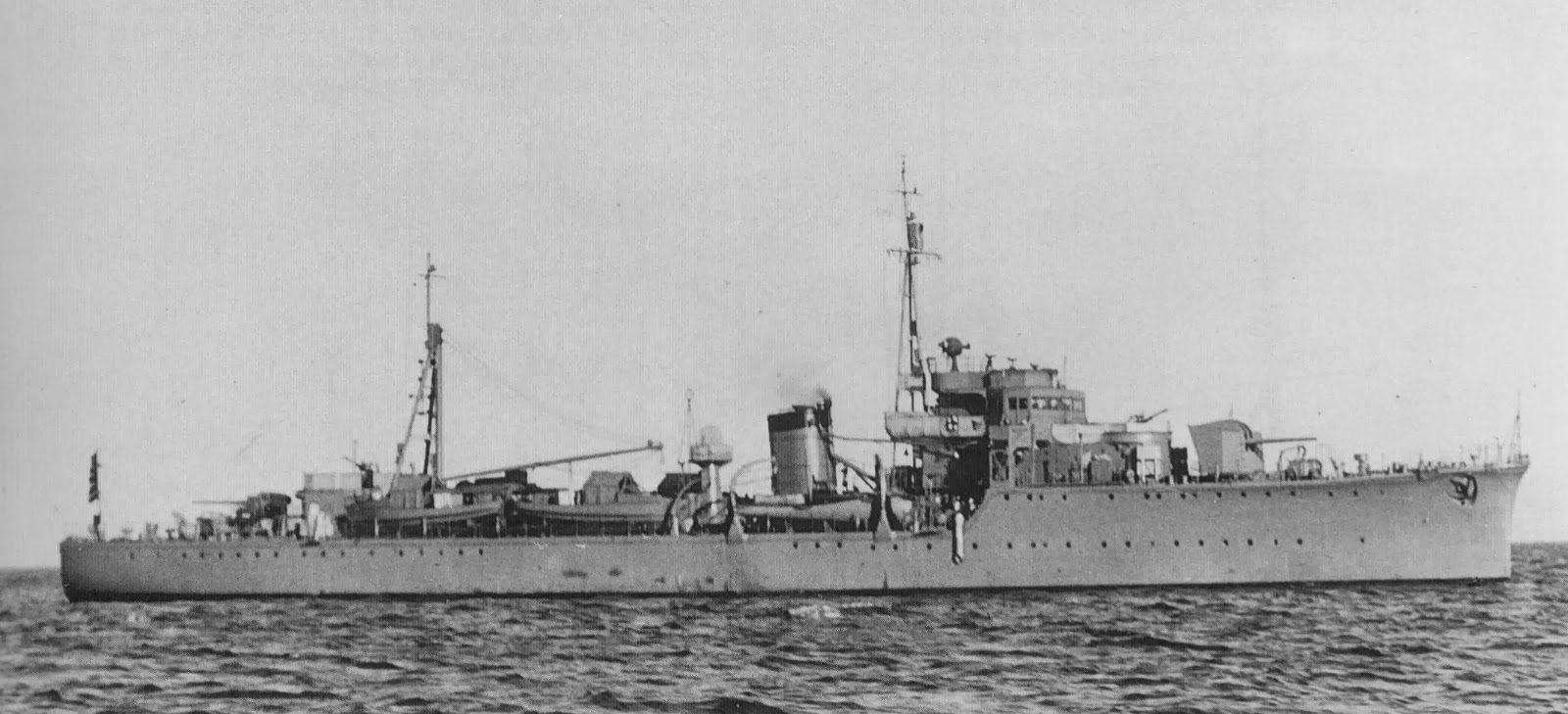
Survey ship Tsukushi

Date	Top classification	Higher classification	Classification	Lower classification	Note, classification boundary
31 March 1922	Auxiliary vessels	Auxiliary vessel	Survey ship		

=== Target ship ===
- This section treats a self-propelled target ship. Towed target ship is miscellaneous ship.

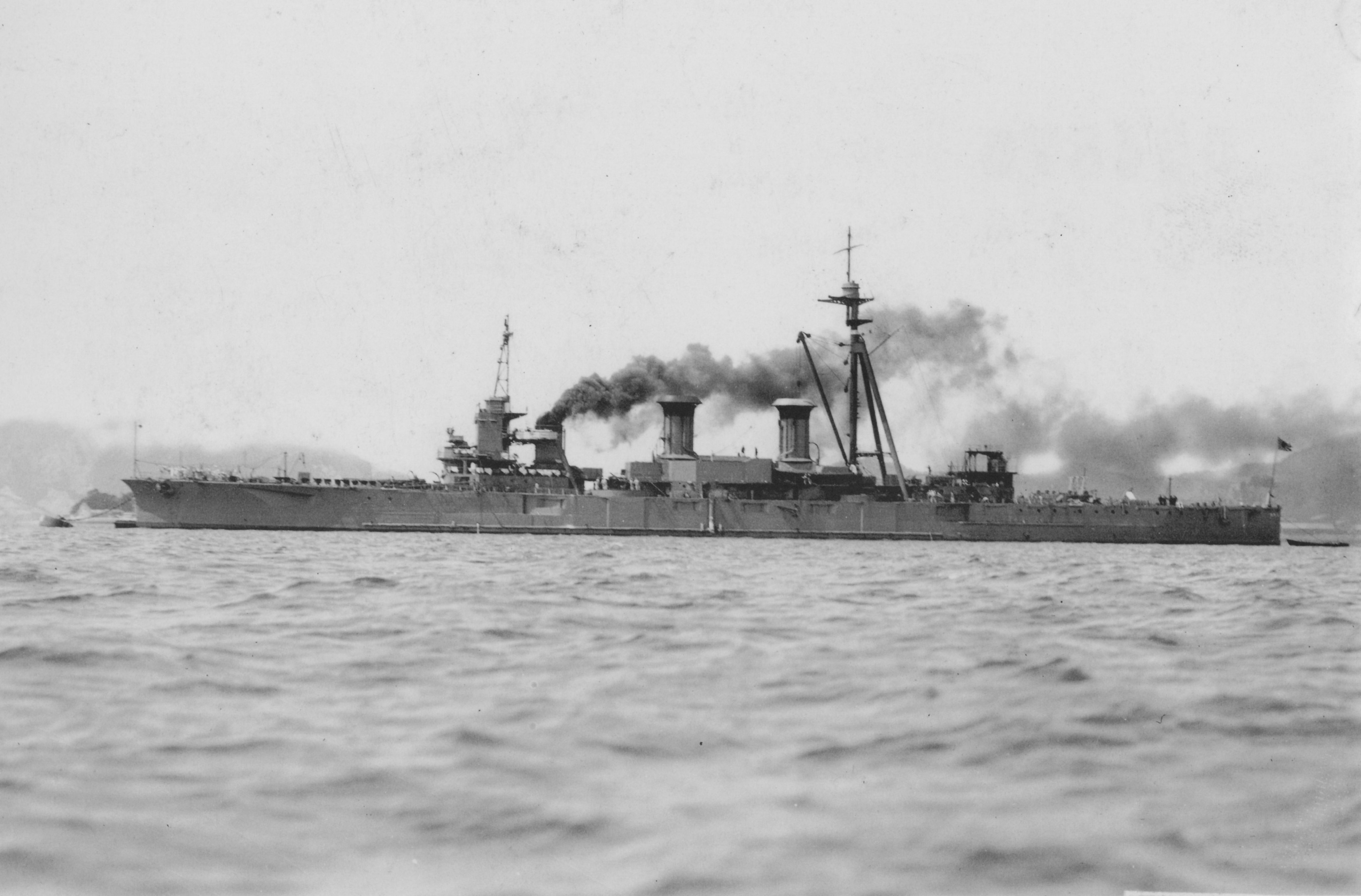
Target ship Settsu

Date	Top classification	Higher classification	Classification	Lower classification	Note, classification boundary
29 September 1923	Auxiliary vessels	Auxiliary vessel	Target ship		

=== Auxiliary training ship ===
Auxiliary training ship Shikishima

Date	Top classification	Higher classification	Classification	Lower classification	Note, classification boundary
30 November 1922	Auxiliary vessels	Auxiliary vessel	Auxiliary training ship		

=== Submarine depot boat ===
Date	Top classification	Higher classification	Classification	Lower classification	Note, classification boundary
1 July 1920	Auxiliary vessels	Auxiliary boat	Submarine depot boat		Moved from miscellaneous ship
between 1 July 1942–30 September 1944					Abolished

== Appendix ==
=== Miscellaneous ship ===
==== 17 September 1903 (Initial) ====
- 17 September 1903, Notice No. 90, Quorum and kinds of miscellaneous ship in naval units, Minister's Secretariat, Ministry of the Navy (明治36年9月17日 海軍大臣官房 達第90号 海軍各廳附属雑役船ノ種類及定数, 1903 Tatsu Dai-90-Gō, Kaigun kakuchō fuzoku zatsuekisen-no shurui oyobi teisū)

Steamship (汽船, Kisen)	And over 250 tons displacement, and less 400 tons displacement	
Steamship (汽船, Kisen)	150 tons displacement	
Steamship (汽船, Kisen)	80 tons displacement	
Steamship (汽船, Kisen)	60 tons displacement	
Steamship (汽船, Kisen)	35 tons displacement	
Steamship (汽船, Kisen)	16 tons displacement	
Steamship (汽船, Kisen)	12.5 tons displacement	
Steamship (汽船, Kisen)	And less 10 tons displacement	
Boat (端舟, Hashibune)	38 feet launch	
Boat (端舟, Hashibune)	32 feet pinnace	
Boat (端舟, Hashibune)	30 feet cutter	
Boat (端舟, Hashibune)	28 feet cutter	
Boat (端舟, Hashibune)	26 feet cutter	
Boat (端舟, Hashibune)	23 feet cutter	
Boat (端舟, Hashibune)	30 feet gig	
Boat (端舟, Hashibune)	27 feet gig	
Boat (端舟, Hashibune)	25 feet gig	
Yard auxiliary ship (雑船, Zatsusen)	Rigged torpedo boat (帆装水雷船, Hansō suiraisen)	
Yard auxiliary ship (雑船, Zatsusen)	Dredger (泥浚船, Deishunsen)	
Yard auxiliary ship (雑船, Zatsusen)	Mechanical dredger (泥浚器船, Deishunkisen); dipper dredger, bucket dredger, grab dredger and pump dredger	
Yard auxiliary ship (雑船, Zatsusen)	Drilling ship (岩砕船, Gansaisen)	
Yard auxiliary ship (雑船, Zatsusen)	Water supply ship (水船, Suisen)	Steamer (汽走, Kisō); and over 150 tons loadage, and less 300 tons loadage
Yard auxiliary ship (雑船, Zatsusen)	Water supply ship (水船, Suisen)	Western style ship (西洋形, Seiyōgata); and over 100 tons loadage, and less 200 tons loadage
Yard auxiliary ship (雑船, Zatsusen)	Water supply ship (水船, Suisen)	Japanese style ship (和形, Wagata); and over 10 tons loadage, and less 30 tons loadage
Yard auxiliary ship (雑船, Zatsusen)	Barge (運貨船, Unkasen); And over 50 tons loadage, and less 100 tons loadage	
Yard auxiliary ship (雑船, Zatsusen)	Coal supply ship (石炭船, Sekitansen); And over 50 tons loadage, and less 150 tons loadage	
Yard auxiliary ship (雑船, Zatsusen)	Lighter (五大力船, Godairikisen); And over 20 tons loadage, and less 30 tons loadage	
Yard auxiliary ship (雑船, Zatsusen)	Hopper barge (泥受船, Doroukesen)	
Yard auxiliary ship (雑船, Zatsusen)	Junk (伝馬船, Tenmasen)	
Yard auxiliary ship (雑船, Zatsusen)	High-speed oars (押送船, Oshokurisen)	
Yard auxiliary ship (雑船, Zatsusen)	Floating pier (足場船, Ashibasen); And over 30 feet, and less 46 feet	
Yard auxiliary ship (雑船, Zatsusen)	Dumper (塵芥船, Jinkaisen)	
Yard auxiliary ship (雑船, Zatsusen)	Floating crane (起重器船, Kijūkisen)	50 tons ability
Yard auxiliary ship (雑船, Zatsusen)	Floating crane (起重器船, Kijūkisen)	15 tons ability
Yard auxiliary ship (雑船, Zatsusen)	Floating drydock (浮船渠, Ukisenkyo)	
Yard auxiliary ship (雑船, Zatsusen)	Pile driver (杭打器船, Kuiuchikisen)	
Yard auxiliary ship (雑船, Zatsusen)	Pontoon (橋船, Kyōsen)	
Yard auxiliary ship (雑船, Zatsusen)	Training ship (練習船, Renshūsen)	

=== Converted merchant ship classification tables ===
==== 23 December 1916 (Initial) ====
- 23 December 1916, Ministerial ordinance No. 281, Special service ships and units ordinance, Minister's Secretariat, Ministry of the Navy (大正5年12月23日 海軍大臣官房 内令第281号 特設艦船部隊令, 1916 Nairei Dai-281-Gō, Tokusetsukansen butairei)

Converted merchant vessels (特設艦船, Tokusetsu kansen)	Converted merchant cruiser (特設巡洋艦, Tokusetsu jun'yōkan)	
Converted merchant vessels (特設艦船, Tokusetsu kansen)	Converted merchant torpedo recovery ship (特設水雷母艦, Tokusetsu suiraibokan)	
Converted merchant vessels (特設艦船, Tokusetsu kansen)	Converted merchant air group carrier (特設航空隊母艦, Tokusetsu kōkūtaibokan)	
Converted merchant vessels (特設艦船, Tokusetsu kansen)	Converted merchant minesweeper division depot ship (特設掃海隊母艦, Tokusetsu sōkaitaibokan)	
Converted merchant vessels (特設艦船, Tokusetsu kansen)	Converted merchant gunboat (特設砲艦, Tokusetsu hōkan)	
Converted merchant vessels (特設艦船, Tokusetsu kansen)	Converted merchant minesweeper (特設掃海艇, Tokusetsu sōkaitei)	
Converted merchant vessels (特設艦船, Tokusetsu kansen)	Converted merchant repair ship (特設工作船, Tokusetsu kōsakusen)	
Converted merchant vessels (特設艦船, Tokusetsu kansen)	Converted merchant transport ship (特設運送船, Tokusetsu unsōsen)	Munition and ammunition ship (給兵船, Kyūheisen)
Converted merchant vessels (特設艦船, Tokusetsu kansen)	Converted merchant transport ship (特設運送船, Tokusetsu unsōsen)	Water supply ship (給水船, Kyūsuisen)
Converted merchant vessels (特設艦船, Tokusetsu kansen)	Converted merchant transport ship (特設運送船, Tokusetsu unsōsen)	Food supply ship (給糧船, Kyūryōsen)
Converted merchant vessels (特設艦船, Tokusetsu kansen)	Converted merchant transport ship (特設運送船, Tokusetsu unsōsen)	Collier (給炭船, Kyūtansen)
Converted merchant vessels (特設艦船, Tokusetsu kansen)	Converted merchant transport ship (特設運送船, Tokusetsu unsōsen)	Oiler (給油船, Kyūyusen)
Converted merchant vessels (特設艦船, Tokusetsu kansen)	Converted merchant transport ship (特設運送船, Tokusetsu unsōsen)	Communication ship (通信船, Tsūshinsen)
Converted merchant vessels (特設艦船, Tokusetsu kansen)	Converted merchant transport ship (特設運送船, Tokusetsu unsōsen)	Freighter (雑用船, Zatsuyōsen)
Converted merchant vessels (特設艦船, Tokusetsu kansen)	Converted merchant cable layer (特設電線敷設船, Tokusetsu densenfusetsusen)	
Converted merchant vessels (特設艦船, Tokusetsu kansen)	Converted merchant hospital ship (特設病院船, Tokusetsu byōinsen)	
Converted merchant vessels (特設艦船, Tokusetsu kansen)	Converted merchant salvage ship (特設救難船, Tokusetsu kyūnansen)	

==== February 1945 (Final) ====
- February 1945, Ministerial ordinance No. 83, Special service ships and units ordinance, Minister's Secretariat, Ministry of the Navy (昭和20年2月 海軍大臣官房 内令第83号, 1945 Nairei Dai-83-Gō)

Converted merchant vessels	Converted merchant warship (特設軍艦, Tokusetsu gunkan)	Converted merchant cruiser	
Converted merchant vessels	Converted merchant warship (特設軍艦, Tokusetsu gunkan)	Converted merchant minelayer (特設敷設艦, Tokusetsu fusetsukan)	
Converted merchant vessels	Converted merchant warship (特設軍艦, Tokusetsu gunkan)	Converted merchant rapid extension netlayer (特設急設網艦, Tokusetsu kyūsetsumōkan)	
Converted merchant vessels	Converted merchant warship (特設軍艦, Tokusetsu gunkan)	Converted merchant aircraft carrier (特設航空母艦, Tokusetsu kōkūbokan)	
Converted merchant vessels	Converted merchant warship (特設軍艦, Tokusetsu gunkan)	Converted merchant seaplane tender (特設水上機母艦, Tokusetsu suijōkibokan)	
Converted merchant vessels	Converted merchant warship (特設軍艦, Tokusetsu gunkan)	Converted merchant aircraft transport ship (特設航空機運搬艦, Tokusetsu kōkūki unpankan)	
Converted merchant vessels	Converted merchant warship (特設軍艦, Tokusetsu gunkan)	Converted merchant torpedo recovery ship	
Converted merchant vessels	Converted merchant warship (特設軍艦, Tokusetsu gunkan)	Converted merchant submarine tender (特設潜水母艦, Tokusetsu sensuibokan)	
Converted merchant vessels	Converted merchant warship (特設軍艦, Tokusetsu gunkan)	Converted merchant minesweeper tender (特設掃海母艦, Tokusetsu sōkaibokan)	
Converted merchant vessels	Converted merchant warship (特設軍艦, Tokusetsu gunkan)	Converted merchant gunboat	
Converted merchant vessels	Converted merchant auxiliary boat (特設特務艇, Tokusetsu tokumutei)	Converted merchant capture-net layer (特設捕獲網艇, Tokusetsu hokakumōtei)	
Converted merchant vessels	Converted merchant auxiliary boat (特設特務艇, Tokusetsu tokumutei)	Converted merchant anti-submarine net layer (特設防潜網艇, Tokusetsu bōsenmōtei)	
Converted merchant vessels	Converted merchant auxiliary boat (特設特務艇, Tokusetsu tokumutei)	Converted merchant mine boat (特設敷設艇, Tokusetsu fusetsutei)	
Converted merchant vessels	Converted merchant auxiliary boat (特設特務艇, Tokusetsu tokumutei)	Converted merchant submarine chaser (特設駆潜艇, Tokusetsu kusentei)	
Converted merchant vessels	Converted merchant auxiliary boat (特設特務艇, Tokusetsu tokumutei)	Converted merchant minesweeper	
Converted merchant vessels	Converted merchant auxiliary boat (特設特務艇, Tokusetsu tokumutei)	Converted merchant picket boat (特設監視艇, Tokusetsu kanshitei)	
Converted merchant vessels	Converted merchant auxiliary vessels (特設特務艦船, Tokusetsu tokumukansen)	Converted merchant transport vessel (特設運送艦, Tokusetsu unsōkan)	
Converted merchant vessels	Converted merchant auxiliary vessels (特設特務艦船, Tokusetsu tokumukansen)	Converted merchant transport ship	Munition and ammunition ship
Converted merchant vessels	Converted merchant auxiliary vessels (特設特務艦船, Tokusetsu tokumukansen)	Converted merchant transport ship	Water supply ship
Converted merchant vessels	Converted merchant auxiliary vessels (特設特務艦船, Tokusetsu tokumukansen)	Converted merchant transport ship	Food supply ship
Converted merchant vessels	Converted merchant auxiliary vessels (特設特務艦船, Tokusetsu tokumukansen)	Converted merchant transport ship	Collier
Converted merchant vessels	Converted merchant auxiliary vessels (特設特務艦船, Tokusetsu tokumukansen)	Converted merchant transport ship	Oiler
Converted merchant vessels	Converted merchant auxiliary vessels (特設特務艦船, Tokusetsu tokumukansen)	Converted merchant transport ship	Collier-oiler (給炭油船, Kyūtan'yusen)
Converted merchant vessels	Converted merchant auxiliary vessels (特設特務艦船, Tokusetsu tokumukansen)	Converted merchant transport ship	Communication ship
Converted merchant vessels	Converted merchant auxiliary vessels (特設特務艦船, Tokusetsu tokumukansen)	Converted merchant transport ship	Freighter
Converted merchant vessels	Converted merchant auxiliary vessels (特設特務艦船, Tokusetsu tokumukansen)	Converted merchant repair vessel (特設工作艦, Tokusetsu kōsakukan)	
Converted merchant vessels	Converted merchant auxiliary vessels (特設特務艦船, Tokusetsu tokumukansen)	Converted merchant harbor service vessel (特設港務艦, Tokusetsu kōmukan)	
Converted merchant vessels	Converted merchant auxiliary vessels (特設特務艦船, Tokusetsu tokumukansen)	Converted merchant survey vessel (特設測量艦, Tokusetsu sokuryōkan)	
Converted merchant vessels	Converted merchant auxiliary vessels (特設特務艦船, Tokusetsu tokumukansen)	Converted merchant icebreaker (特設砕氷船, Tokusetsu saihyōsen)	
Converted merchant vessels	Converted merchant auxiliary vessels (特設特務艦船, Tokusetsu tokumukansen)	Converted merchant cable layer	
Converted merchant vessels	Converted merchant auxiliary vessels (特設特務艦船, Tokusetsu tokumukansen)	Converted merchant hospital ship	
Converted merchant vessels	Converted merchant auxiliary vessels (特設特務艦船, Tokusetsu tokumukansen)	Converted merchant salvage ship	
Converted merchant vessels	Converted merchant auxiliary vessels (特設特務艦船, Tokusetsu tokumukansen)	Converted merchant miscellaneous ship (特設雑役船, Tokusetsu zatsuekisen)	

== See also ==
- Japanese ship-naming conventions
- List of ships of the Imperial Japanese Navy
- List of Japanese Navy ships and war vessels in World War II

== Bibliography ==
- Summary of Naval military commands, Naval Minister's Secretariat/Ministry of the Navy
  - Vol. 1, April 1936 (24th supplement, March 1945)
  - Vol. 3, April 1936 (24th supplement, March 1945)
- Series 100 year histories from Meiji Era, Ministry of the Navy, printed by Hara Shobō (Japan)
  - Vol. 172, Histories of Naval organizations #2, original plot in 1941, reprint in March 1971
  - Vol. 173, Histories of Naval organizations #3 (1), original plot in 1939, reprint in May 1971
  - Vol. 174, Histories of Naval organizations #3 (2), original plot in 1939, reprint in July 1971
  - Vol. 180, Histories of Naval organizations #8, original plot in January 1940, reprint in October 1971
- The Maru Special, Ushio Shobō (Japan)
  - Japanese Naval Vessels No. 25, "Japanese seaplane tenders w/ auxiliary seaplane tenders", March 1979
  - Japanese Naval Vessels No. 29, "Japanese submarine tenders w/ auxiliary submarine tenders", July 1979
  - Japanese Naval Vessels No. 34, "Japanese auxiliary vessels", December 1979
  - Japanese Naval Vessels No. 39, "Japanese torpedo boats", May 1980
  - Japanese Naval Vessels No. 42, "Japanese minelayers", August 1980
  - Japanese Naval Vessels No. 45, "Japanese gunboats", November 1980
  - Japanese Naval Vessels No. 47, "Japanese minewarfare crafts", January 1981
  - Japanese Naval Vessels No. 49, "Japanese submarine chasers and patrol boats", March 1981
  - Japanese Naval Vessels No. 50, "Japanese minesweepers and landing ships", April 1981
  - Japanese Naval Vessels No. 53, "Japanese support vessels", July 1981
  - Japanese Naval Vessels No. 132, "Japanese submarines I", February 1988
  - Japanese Naval Vessels No. 133, "Japanese submarines II", March 1988
  - Japanese Naval Vessels No. 134, "Japanese submarines III", April 1988
  - Japanese Naval Vessels No. 135, "Japanese submarines IV", May 1988
- Monthly Ships of the World, "Kaijinsha". (Japan)
  - No. 391, Special issue Vol. 24, "Japanese battleships", March 1988
  - No. 441, Special issue Vol. 32, "Japanese cruisers", September 1991
  - No. 453, Special issue Vol. 34, "History of Japanese destroyers", July 1992
  - No. 469, Special issue Vol. 37, "History of Japanese submarines", August 1993
  - No. 481, Special issue Vol. 40, "History of Japanese aircraft carriers", May 1994
  - No. 500, Special issue Vol. 44, "Ships of the Imperial Japanese Navy", August 1995
  - No. 507, Special issue Vol. 45, "Escort Vessels of the Imperial Japanese Navy", February 1996
  - No. 522, Special issue Vol. 47, "Auxiliary Vessels of the Imperial Japanese Navy", March 1997
  - No. 681, Special issue Vol. 79, "History of Japanese battleships", October 2007
  - No. 736, Special issue Vol. 95, "History of Japanese aircraft carriers", January 2011
  - No. 754, Special issue Vol. 101, "History of Japanese cruisers", January 2012
- "Japan Center for Asian Historical Records (JACAR)"., National Archives of Japan
  - Reference code: A03020231100, Original script signed by the Emperor / Imperial ordinance No.71 of 1896 /Abolition of Naval ships ordinance established in and Warship ordinance
  - Reference code: A03020647600, The script signed by the Emperor, 1905, Imperial Ordinance No.258, Amendment and addition to the Naval Warships and Other Vessels Ordinance.
  - Reference code: A08072692000, Classification standard table of warship and special service vessels
  - Reference code: C08050092300, Classification table of special naval ships (1)
  - Reference code: C09090196000, Messages of Council of State inquiry to Seiin about Navy rules and salary table
  - Reference code: C09110630100, Jurisdiction Vessels rank correction caused by proclamation
- 1/700 Water Line Series Guide Book of Imperial Japanese Navy ships, Shizuoka Plastic Model Manufacturers Association (Aoshima Bunka Kyozai/Tamiya Corporation/Hasegawa Corporation), October 2007
