= Hashima-class cable layer =

Imperial Japanese cable-laying ship

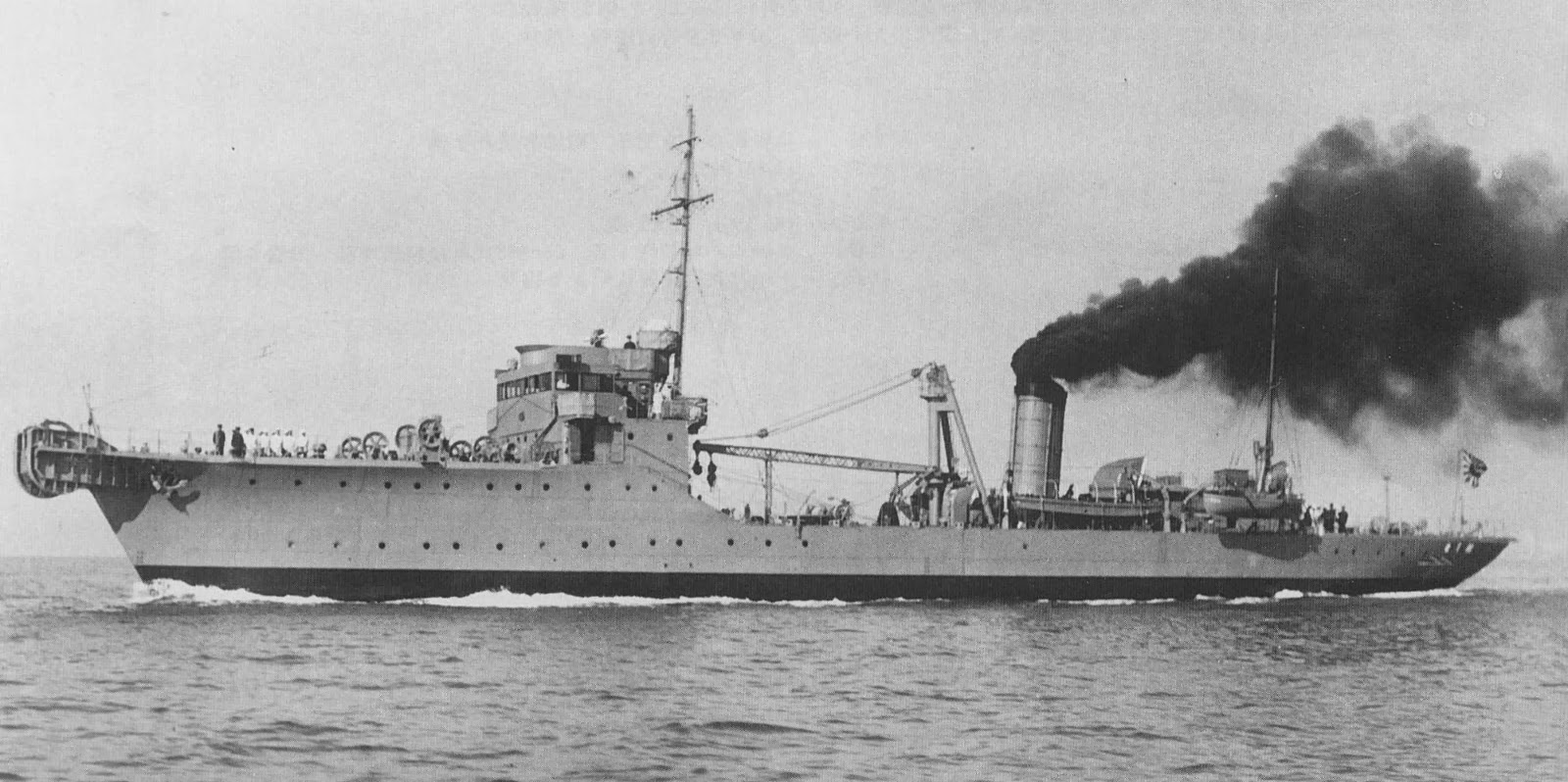
- Hashima on 25 October 1940

Class overview
- Name: Hashima-class cable layer
- Builders: Kawasaki Shipbuilding Corporation; Harima Zōsen Corporation
- Operators: Imperial Japanese Navy; Government of Japan; Nippon Telegraph and Telephone Public Corporation
- Cost: 1,760,000 JPY
- Built: 1939–1941
- In commission: 1940–1968
- Planned: 4
- Completed: 4
- Lost: 3
- Retired: 1

General characteristics
- Type: Cable layer
- Displacement: 1,560 long tons (1,585 t) standard
- Length: 76.80 m (252 ft 0 in) overall
- Beam: 10.80 m (35 ft 5 in)
- Draught: 3.53 m (11 ft 7 in)
- Propulsion: 2 × triple expansion stages reciprocating engines; 2 × Kampon coal-fired boilers; 2 shafts, 600 shp
- Speed: 14.0 knots (16.1 mph; 25.9 km/h)
- Range: 1,000 nmi (1,900 km) at 12 kn (14 mph; 22 km/h)
- Complement: 109
- Armament: 1 × 76.2 mm (3.00 in) L/40 AA gun; 2 × 13.2 mm (0.52 in) AA guns; 9 × depth charges; 12 × Type 92 remotely controlled mines or 20,000 m (65,616 ft 10 in)) submarine cable

The Hashima-class cable layers (初島型電纜敷設艇,, Hashima-gata Denran-Fusetsutei) were the only class of purpose-built cable layers of the Imperial Japanese Navy (IJN), serving during World War II. Four vessels were built in 1939–41 under the Maru 4 Programme.

Apart from laying communications cables, these ships were also designed as mine planters, for the installation of controlled mines in coastal fortifications.

== Ships in class ==
Project number J21.

| Ship | Builder | Laid down | Launched | Completed | Fate |
| Hashima (初島) ex-Hatsushima | Kawasaki, Kōbe Shipyard | 15 October 1939 as Hatsushima | 10 April 1940 | 25 October 1940 as Hashima | Renamed Hashima on 25 October 1940. Sunk by USS Sennet off Owase 33°58′N 136°17′E on 28 April 1945. Decommissioned on 10 July 1945. |
| Tsurushima (釣島) | Kawasaki, Kōbe Shipyard | 15 January 1940 | 24 May 1940 | 28 March 1941 | Decommissioned on 30 November 1945. Transferred to Ministry of Communications and Transportation and renamed Tsurushima Maru (釣島丸) in 1945. Transferred to Nippon Telegraph and Telephone Public Corporation on 8 September 1951. Retired in March 1968. |
| Ōtate (大立) | Harima Zōsen | 22 April 1940 | 11 December 1940 | 31 July 1941 | Sunk by air raid off Kusagaki Islands 30°40′N 127°50′E on 27 March 1945. Decommissioned on 10 July 1945. |
| Tateishi (立石) | Harima Zōsen | 22 April 1940 | 1 March 1941 | 31 August 1941 | Sunk by air raid in South China Sea 11°50′N 109°18′E on 21 March 1945. Decommissioned on 10 May 1945. |

== Photos ==
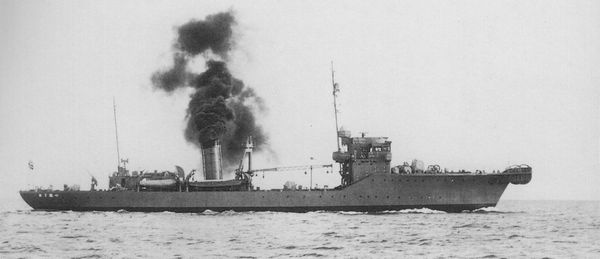
Tsurushima on 20 March 1941

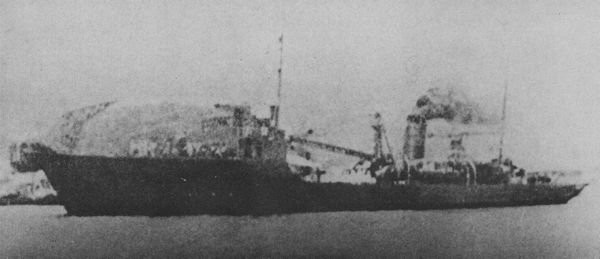
Ōtate in 1941

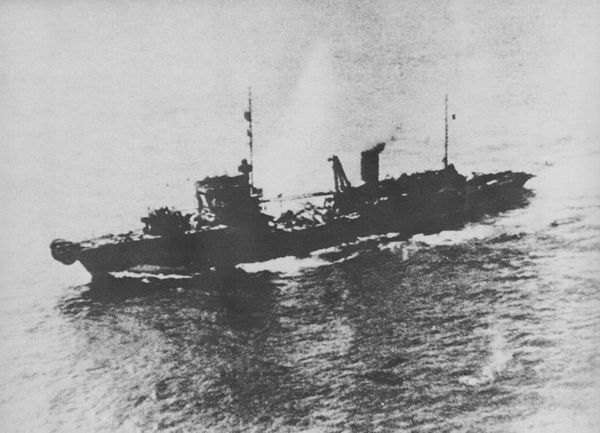
Tateishi on 21 March 1945

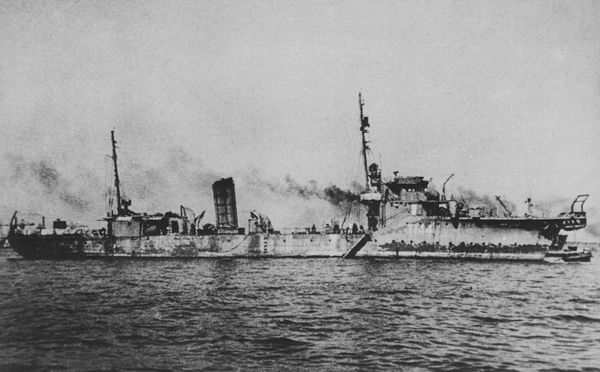
Tsurushima Maru in postwar

== Bibliography ==
- Monthly Ships of the World, Special issue Vol.45, "Escort Vessels of the Imperial Japanese Navy", "Kaijinsha"., (Japan), February 1996
- The Maru Special, Japanese Naval Vessels No.47, "Japanese naval mine warfare crafts", "Ushio Shobō". (Japan), January 1981
- Senshi Sōsho Vol.31, Naval armaments and war preparation (1), "Until November 1941", Asagumo Simbun (Japan), November 1969
