= Imperial Japanese Army Railways and Shipping Section =

Military logistics unit of the Imperial Japanese Army

The Imperial Japanese Army Railway and Shipping Section (鉄道連隊, Tetsudō Rentai; lit. "Railroad Regiment") was the logistics unit of the Imperial Japanese Army charged with shipping personnel, material and equipment from metropolitan Japan to the combat front overseas.

== Overview and history ==
Following the First Sino-Japanese War, the Imperial Japanese Army saw a need for improving the delivery of military supplies to occupied territories. Patterned after a similar group in the Imperial German Army, they created the Railway Battalion (鉄道大隊, Tetsudō Daitai) in 1896. A temporary railway corps worked from 1900-1901 (during the Boxer Rebellion) to repair the damage done to part of the railway (now part of the Jingha Railway). The Railway Battalion built railways and transported goods and personnel from 1904-1905 during the Russo-Japanese War, including building and operating the Gyeongui Line, the rail system that is now the Shendan Railway, and what is now the Jingha Railway.

== Railway ==
Under it were the Railway Ministry, the South Manchuria Railway, Chinese Eastern Railway (later absorbed by the Manchukuo National Railway), the North China Transportation Company, the Central China Railway, Southern Asian Railway facilities amongst Civil Merchants shipping transports. It also worked with the Imperial Japanese Navy Shipping Services. The section was commanded by Okikatsu Arao, Sōsaku Suzuki and other Army officers.

The section comprised the First (Operations) and Third (Transportation and Communications) bureaux, the 2nd (Operations) and 10th (Shipping and Railways) sections. To conduct operations on rivers and at sea the Japanese Army produced many kinds of vessel, i.e. landing craft, motorboats, gun boats, landing ships etc.

In the Pacific War, they built aircraft carriers and submarines. Besides the Army engineer units for river-crossing, the Japanese Army had their own shipping force to transport troops at sea which sometimes acted in concert with Japanese Navy vessels to transport their forces.

It was a large force which employed 300,000 soldiers (Army Shipping Units) at maximum and managed 30% of Japanese transport ships. For the Japanese Army, the Pacific War was not only a battle on the ground, but also at sea. Many Japanese soldiers fought on board against enemy submarines, PT boats and airplanes. At last, they rode on a Kamikaze special-attack boat and dashed into the enemy ship.

== Air transport ==
Air transport was charged to Hikōtai Transport Unit of the Imperial Japanese Army Air Service, sometimes both services were coordinated with amphibious transport services and other special wartime operations. In Manchukuo the Army was linked to transport services with local transport units of Kwantung Army Railway and Air Transport units and Manchukuoan Air and land Transport services which served in Kwantung, Northern China, Manchukuo and Chosen.

On land the Army also used the services of Kwantung Army Field Railway Command (in Manchukuo), the 1st and 2nd Field Railway Commands, China Expeditionary Army (Chinese occupied lands) and Southeast Asia Field Railway Command of Southern Army in its controlled lands along with land transports services in its Army units in combat front joining rail services previously mentioned.

Actually, shipping and aircraft were parts of a vicious circle. In order to realize increased production of aircraft, raw materials had to be conveyed by ship from overseas. Since vessels were lost in the process, a shortage of materials resulted. This affected the output of planes. But if aircraft were not turned out in increased numbers, surface shipping could not be covered from the air. Thus, the more ships were sunk, the less airplanes could be manufactured. Herein lay the cause for increasingly bitter antagonism between the Army and the Navy.

== Shipping operations ==
The loss of ships increased sharply as the war went on. In round figures, the total tonnage of Army, Navy, and commercial shipping sunk mounted from year to year; that is, from about 880,000 tons in 1942 to 1,600,000 tons by the next year. The approximate net difference between new construction and losses amounted to minus 460,000 tons in 1942, and to minus 490,000 tons in 1943. (Prior to the start of the War, shipping losses had been expected to total some 800,000 tons during the first year of hostilities, and only 600,000 tons during the second.)

In 1944 shipping losses soared: 290,000 tons in January; 380,000 tons in February; and 340,000 tons in March. Because of this critical situation, convoy measures became a pressing problem of the Army and the Navy.

An agreement had been reached between the two armed services, whereby the Navy was to assume responsibility for convoying ships. But the Navy was preoccupied with combat operations and could not take care of shipping protection. The personnel charged with Army shipping operations felt that the prerequisite for victory in the Pacific War was safeguarding surface transportation. They argued strongly that the Combined Fleet should devote its main strength to convoy work, like the British Navy had done during World War I. In order to gain naval victory, Japan should use both aircraft carriers and island bases (the so-called "unsinkable carriers") to knock out enemy warships from the air. Efforts should meanwhile be made to reinforce air power by making surface transportation secure-thus accelerating aircraft production, in turn. Although the Navy set up a Shipping Convoy Headquarters toward the end of 1943, the tonnage of losses did not decrease. The Army therefore adopted its own measures for coping with the problem:

1. Hurriedly build wartime-type vessels
2. Construct transport submarines and special convoy vessels (a kind of special escort/aircraft carrier)
3. Produce anti-submarine radar weapons
4. Arm merchantmen with anti-submarine guns

By 1944, measures to counter the mounting losses of ships had become imperative, and both of the armed services were conducting joint investigations. On March 17, 1944, a Joint Army-Navy Conference was held in the presence of the Emperor, to study methods of meeting the shipping-loss problem. The Army sent its chief of staff, the two deputy chiefs, the heads of the First (Operations) and Third (Transportation and Communications) bureaus, the heads of the 2nd (Operations) and 10th (Shipping and Railways) sections, the vice-minister of the Army, the chief of the Bureau of Military Affairs, and the head of the Military Affairs Section. The Navy was represented by its counterparts.

There was no precedent for such a session, which indicates the gravity of the shipping menace. The conference took 2 hours, and the Army finally decided to adopt certain major measures:

- An increase in Army Shipping Units (ship engineers-soldiers who could handle large motor vessels)
- Efficient utilization of shipping, by decreasing the amount of munition loads, accelerating both loading and unloading operations, and assigning cargo foremen.
- Anti-submarine protective measures (primarily aircraft)
- Reinforcement of the aerial defenses of maritime bases

War Minister Hideki Tōjō had good reasons for adhering to his opinion during the arguments with the Army High Command about the problem of requisitioning operational shipping space.

Previously, in June 1938, the Army had established the Tama Army Technical Research Institute, with the objective of speeding up the practical application of radar devices. Ground and aerial investigations which, until then, had been pursued separately, were to be integrated and developed along military lines. In order to devise efficient radar weapons for practical use as soon as possible, however, both the Army and the Navy should have pooled their research facilities; but here again the serious rivalry between the armed services stood in the way. The Army itself studied and manufactured anti-submarine radar equipment to be installed on its own transports.

Among those concerned with Army operations, incidentally, not a few were of the opinion that the inferiority of anti-submarine radar devices was a cause for Japan's defeat. In other words, the country lost out in the logistical sense because of great shipping losses, which were in turn directly attributable to the radar weaknesses.

Accompanying the decline in maritime transportation potential, the Army began to seek an improvement in the movement capacity of the railroads on the Asiatic Continent-to make up for deficiencies at sea. On February 10, 1944, the Army accordingly reinforced and redeployed its railway forces on a large scale. Four organizations were set up:

- Kwantung Army Field Railway Command
- 1st and 2nd Field Railway Commands, China Expeditionary Army (North and Central China, respectively)
- Field Railway Command, Southern Army, Southeast Asia

== List of commanders and units in Railways and Shipping Section ==
=== General commanders in Railways and Shipping services ===
- Okikatsu Arao: Section Chief (Railways and Shipping), Army General Staff
- Sōsaku Suzuki: Chief, Army Shipping Department and Central Shipping Transportation Headquarters
- Yoshio Kozuki: Commanding General, Shipping Transportation Headquarters
- Hideo Baba: General Officer Commanding Army Maritime Transport Command

=== Shipping units commanders ===
- Masazumi Inada: Commanding Officer 3rd Shipping Transport Command, Singapore
- Shinobu Ito: Commanding Officer 2nd Shipping Transport Command, China
- Hakaru Gondo: Commanding Officer 13th Shipping Group
- 53rd Army Anchorange HQ, Uruppu, Kuriles
- 6th Disembarkation Unit (800 men), Uruppu, Kuriles
- 6th Shipping Army Engineers Regiment, Etorofu, Kuriles

=== Railways units commanders ===
- Hatazō Adachi: Commanding Officer Kwantung Army Railway Command
- Shizuo Yokoyama: Commander of Railway Sector Headquarters, Kwantung Army
- Hitoshi Hamada: Second Superintendent of Railways, Thailand
- Katsumi Adachi: General Officer Commanding 4th Special Railway Corps, Thailand

=== Transport units commanders ===
- Utata Fukunaga: Commanding Officer 16th Field Transport Command, Malaya
- Kiyoshi Hiraoka: Commanding Officer 11th Field Transport Command, China
- Nobuyoshi Obata: Commanding Officer, Transportation Regiment, Imperial Guard Division (serving in Tokyo; French Indo-China; Malaya; Sumatra)
- 88th Transport Regiment, Karafuto

== List of Japanese Army watercraft used during the Pacific War ==
=== River-crossing craft ===
- Type 95 Collapsible Boat
- Type 99 Pontoon Bridge
- Rubber Rafts

=== Motorized landing craft ===
- Personnel landing craft "Shohatsu"
- Vehicle landing craft "Daihatsu"
- Vehicle landing craft "Toku-Daihatsu"
- Vehicle landing craft "Mokusei-Daihatsu"

=== Liaison motorboats ===
- Speedboat Model Ko
- Speedboat Model Otsu

=== Special attack motorboat ===
- Suicide-Attack Motorboat "Maru-Re"

=== Patrol boats/gun boats ===
- Armored boat "AB-Tei"
- Armored boat "ST-Tei"
- Submarine-chaser "Karo-Tei"
- Escort ships "Type 5", models Ko and Otsu

=== Landing craft carriers ===
- Landing craft carrier "Shinshu Maru"
- Escort/landing craft carrier Model Ko, Otsu, Hei

=== Transport vessels ===
- Tank landing ship "SS-Tei"
- Fast transport vessel "Yi-Go"
- Transport submarine "Maru-Yu"

== See also ==
- Foreign commerce and shipping of Empire of Japan
- Merchant-shipping codes: JN-39 (Maru code)/JN-40/JN-152/JN-167
- Imperial Japanese Army shipping artillery
