= Japanese landing craft carrier Kumano Maru =

Landing craft carrier of the Imperial Japanese Army

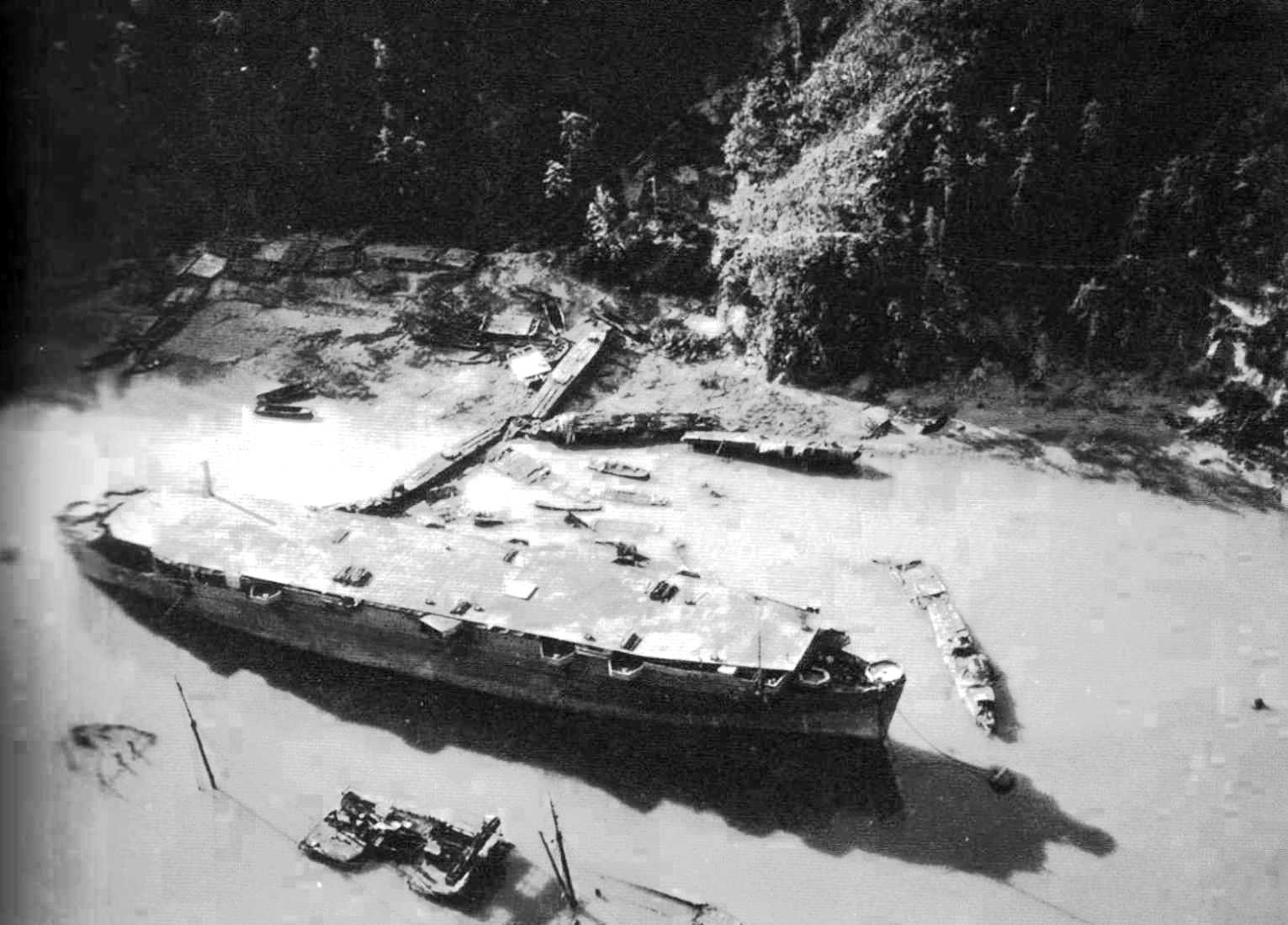
- Aerial view of disarmed Kumano Maru, 1945

Class overview
- Name: M Type C Special Purpose Ship
- Operators: Imperial Japanese Army
- Preceded by: Type C Special Purpose Ship
- Succeeded by: None
- Built: 1944–1945
- Planned: 2
- Completed: 1
- Scrapped: 2

History

Empire of Japan
- Name: Kumano Maru
- Builder: Hitachi Shipbuilding, Innoshima
- Laid down: 15 August 1944
- Launched: 28 January 1945
- Completed: 31 March 1945
- In service: 1945–1947
- Captured: 15 August 1945
- Fate: Scrapped, 4 November 1947

General characteristics
- Class & type: M Type C Special Purpose Ship
- Type: Landing craft carrier/escort carrier
- Displacement: 8,128 t (8,000 long tons) (standard)
- Length: 152 m (498 ft 8 in) (o/a)
- Beam: 19.58 m (64 ft 3 in)
- Draught: 6.95 m (23 ft) (deep load)
- Installed power: 3 × water-tube boilers; 10,000 shp (7,500 kW)
- Propulsion: 2 shafts; 2 geared steam turbines
- Speed: 19 or 20 knots (35 or 37 km/h; 22 or 23 mph)
- Range: 6,000 nmi (11,000 km; 6,900 mi) at 17 knots (31 km/h; 20 mph)
- Complement: 107; 1,664 (including troops)
- Armament: 8 × single 75 mm (3 in) AA guns; 6 × single 20 mm (0.8 in) or 25 mm (1 in) AA guns; 2 × single 150 mm (5.9 in) anti-submarine mortars
- Aircraft carried: 8
- Aviation facilities: Arresting gear

Kumano Maru (熊野丸) was a "M Type C" landing craft carrier with a full-length flight deck built for the Imperial Japanese Army (IJA) during World War II. Completed in early 1945, fuel shortages meant that the ship never became operational during the war. She was turned over to the Allies at Kure when Japan surrendered later that year. Before beginning to repatriate Japanese troops home, Kumano Maru was disarmed and modified to facilitate that mission. The ship continued to do so until she was sold for scrap in 1947.

== Background and description ==
In March 1944, the IJA and the Imperial Japanese Navy (IJN) held a conference to decide how to better protect their merchant shipping from the heavy losses suffered at the hands of American submarines. The IJN's escort carriers had, at best, limited success in doing so thus far and the participants focused on improving the number of carriers available. The IJA proposed converting oil tankers into escort carriers (the Special TL Types) and agreed to forgo any further construction of the Akitsu Maru landing craft carrier with limited aviation facilities. The Imperial Japanese Navy Technical Department agreed to design the conversions while the Imperial Japanese Navy General Staff required that the Army's auxiliary escort carriers would be dedicated to protecting the merchant ships. The services agreed that the IJA would convert two standard Type M (military) 9,502-gross register ton (GRT) cargo ships into landing-craft carriers with limited aviation facilities, beginning with Kumano Maru.

The "M Type C" ships had a flush-decked configuration that displaced 8,128 tonnes (8,000 long tons) at standard load, although naval historian Hans Lengerer states that they had a standard displacement of 6,314 t (6,214 long tons). The ships had an overall length of 152 metres (498 ft 8 in), a beam of 19.58 metres (64 ft 3 in) and a draft of 6.95 metres (22 ft 10 in). The flight deck was 110 metres (360 ft 11 in) long, 21.5 metres (70 ft 6 in) wide, and was fitted with a four-wire Kayaba arresting gear system. They had a single aircraft hangar that was served by a lift at the rear of the flight deck. A large crane was fitted on the rear port side of the ship. The intended air group of the "M Type C" was to consist of eight depth-charge equipped Kokusai Ki-76 liaison aircraft. If serving as an aircraft transport, the ships could fit 18 Nakajima Ki-84 Hayate fighters on the flight deck and 17 more in the hangar.

The ships had two Kampon geared steam turbines, each driving one propeller shaft using steam provided by three Kampon water-tube boilers. The fourth boiler cited in many sources was a cylindrical donkey boiler for the ship's steam-powered machinery. The turbines were rated at a total of 10,000 shaft horsepower (7,500 kW) for a speed of 19 knots (35 km/h; 22 mph) or 20 knots (37 km/h; 23 mph). The "M Type C" had a range of 6,000 nautical miles (11,000 km; 6,900 mi) at 17 knots (31 km/h; 20 mph). Their funnels were positioned on the starboard side and vented horizontally outward to keep the flight deck clear. Their bridges were located under the forward edge of the flight deck. Their crew consisted of 107 men; including embarked troops, the ships' complement numbered 1,664.

The Kumano Maru was classified as a "M Type C" landing ship by the IJA. They could carry up to a dozen 17.1-metre (56 ft) Toku Daihatsu-class landing craft and thirteen 14-metre (46 ft) Daihatsu-class landing craft in their holds that were launched on rails through two large doors in the stern.

=== Armament ===
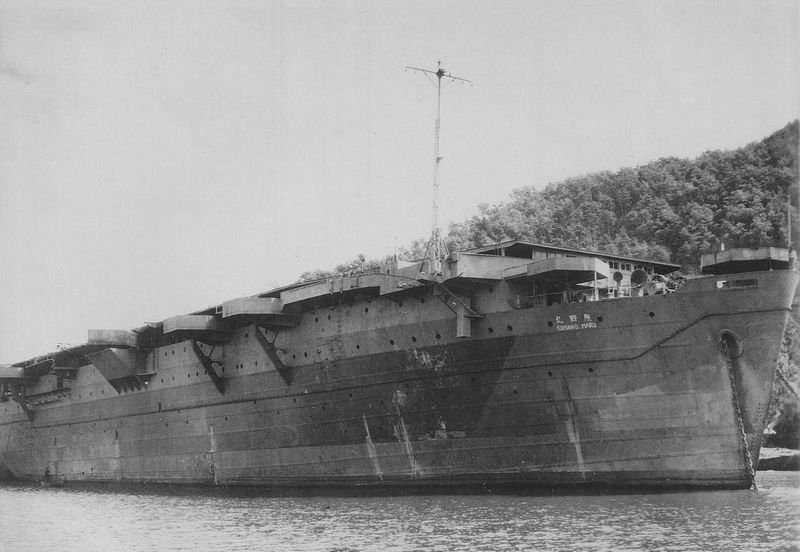
A close-up of the ship at war's end

Air defence for the carriers consisted of eight 75 mm (3 in) Type 88 anti-aircraft (AA) guns on single mounts below the flight deck; three on the starboard side and five on the port side. These fired 6.5 kg (14 lb) projectiles at a muzzle velocity of 720 m/s (2,400 ft/s). These were supplemented by six autocannon on single mounts; two on platforms in front of the flight deck and the remainder on a platform aft of the flight deck. Sources disagree whether they were Army 20 mm (0.8 in) Type 98 guns or Navy 25 mm (1 in) Type 96 guns. The Type 98 gun fired its 136 g (4.8 oz) shells at a practical rate of 100 rounds per minute, while the Type 96 gun had a rate of fire for its 250 g (8.8 oz) shells of about 110 rounds per minute.

The ships were also equipped with two single 150 mm (5.9 in) anti-submarine mortars on platforms at the bow and stern. They fired 27-kilogram (60 lb) shells to a range of 4,500 metres (4,900 yd).

== Construction and career ==
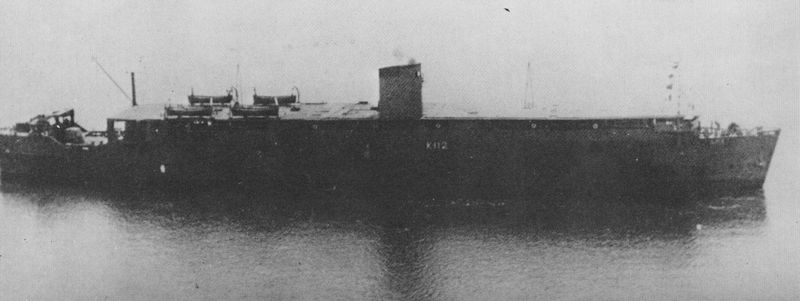
Kumano Maru in 1947 as a repatriation transport

Kumano Maru was laid down at the Hitachi Shipbuilding shipyard at Innoshima, near Kure, as a standard wartime cargo ship on 15 August 1944 and was converted into her carrier configuration while under construction. The ship was launched on 28 January 1945 and was attacked by 13 Grumman F6F Hellcat and 14 Vought F4U Corsair fighters on 19 March during the American air raid on the Kure area. Undamaged during the attack, she was completed on 31 March. Fuel oil shortages caused the Japanese to consider removing her turbines and converting the ship's boilers to burn coal, but nothing was ultimately done. Kumano Maru never became operational during the war.

The ship was turned over to the Allies on 15 August when Japan surrendered and was disarmed. To improve her suitability for the task of repatriating Japanese forces abroad, her horizontal funnel was replaced by a vertical one and four large lifeboats was added on davits that overhung the flight deck. Kumano Maru remained on repatriation duty until she was sold for scrap to Kawasaki in 1947; demolition began at their Kobe facility on 4 November and lasted until 1 September 1948.

== Bibliography ==
- Campbell, John (1985). Naval Weapons of World War II. Naval Institute Press. ISBN 0-87021-459-4.
- Chesneau, Roger (1995). Aircraft Carriers of the World, 1914 to the Present: An Illustrated Encyclopedia (New, revised ed.). Naval Institute Press. ISBN 0-87021-902-2.
- Fukui, Shizuo (1991). Japanese Naval Vessels at the End of World War II. Greenhill Books. ISBN 1-85367-125-8.
- Hackett, Bob & Cundall, Peter (May 2016). "IJA Landing Craft Depot Ship Kumano Maru: Tabular Record of Movement". CombinedFleet.com.
- Jentschura, Hansgeorg; Jung, Dieter & Mickel, Peter (1977). Warships of the Imperial Japanese Navy, 1869–1945. United States Naval Institute. ISBN 0-87021-893-X.
- Lengerer, Hans (2023). The Aircraft Carriers of the Imperial Japanese Navy and Army: Technical and Operational History. Vol. II. Model Hobby. ISBN 978-83-60041-71-0.
- Ness, Leland (2015). Rikkugun: Guide to Japanese Ground Forces 1937–1945. Vol. 2: Weapons of the Imperial Japanese Army & Navy Ground Forces. Helion. ISBN 978-1-909982-75-8.
- Sturton, Ian (1980). "Japan". In Chesneau, Roger (ed.). Conway's All the World's Fighting Ships 1922–1946. Conway Maritime Press. pp. 167–217. ISBN 0-85177-146-7.
