= Japanese landing craft carrier Akitsu Maru =

Landing craft carrier of the Imperial Japanese Army

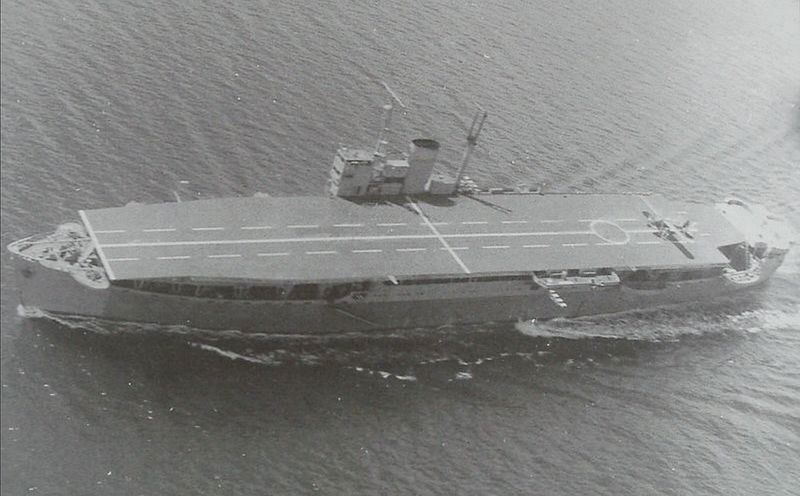
- Akitsu Maru in 1944

Class overview
- Name: Type C Special Purpose Ship
- Operators: Imperial Japanese Army
- Preceded by: Shinshū Maru
- Succeeded by: M Type C Special Purpose Ship
- Built: 1941–1943
- Planned: 2
- Completed: 1 (Note: The Nigitsu Maru was initially planned as a "Type C" landing craft carrier like Akitsu Maru, but was replanned as a "Type A", without any flight deck and looking like a passenger ship.)
- Lost: 1

History

Empire of Japan
- Name: Akitsu Maru
- Builder: Harima, Harima
- Launched: 24 September 1941
- Completed: 30 January 1942
- Fate: Sunk, 15 November 1944

General characteristics
- Class & type: Type C Special Purpose Ship
- Type: Landing craft carrier; Escort carrier
- Tonnage: 9,190 gross tons
- Displacement: Standard: 11,800 tonnes (11,600 long tons; 13,000 short tons)
- Length: 143.75 m (471 ft 7 in) (pp)
- Beam: 19.5 m (64 ft 0 in)
- Draft: 7.857 m (25 ft 9.3 in) (Maximum)
- Installed power: 13,435 shp (10,018 kW) (Total)
- Propulsion: 4 × Triple-drum, water-tube heavy oil-fired boilers; 2 × Ishikawajima-made two-stage reduction geared steam turbines; 2 × Shafts
- Speed: 21 knots (39 km/h; 24 mph)
- Boats & landing craft carried: 27 Daihatsu-class landing craft
- Sensors & processing systems: Hydrophone
- Armament: See § Armaments
- Aircraft carried: 30 (as aircraft ferry); 8 (as aircraft carrier)

Akitsu Maru (あきつ丸) was a "Type C" landing craft carrier with a full-length flight deck built for the Imperial Japanese Army (IJA) during World War II. The ship was originally a passenger liner taken over by the IJA before completion. Akitsu Maru's planned role was to provide aircover during amphibious and landing operations; in practice the ship was essentially an aircraft ferry. The ship was sunk by USS Queenfish on 15 November 1944.

In some sources, Akitsu Maru (and Nigitsu Maru) (Note: In reality, the Nigitsu Maru was never fitted with a flight deck.) are considered to be the first amphibious assault ships. Although, this title can be disputed with the earlier 8,000-tonne (7,900-long-ton) Shinshū Maru that served a similar role, and being a template for Akitsu Maru. With the deployment of the Shinshū Maru and the larger, further refined Akitsu Maru, the Japanese amphibious forces had in hand prototypes for all-purpose amphibious ships.

In 1937, British and American observers watched Shinshū Maru at work off Shanghai and immediately recognized a significant development in amphibious warfare. It also carried two catapults for aircraft but did not embark operational seaplanes. It could, however, transport and unload aircraft if necessary, a capability further developed in the Akitsu Maru, which even had a short take-off flight deck.

== Design ==
=== Armaments ===
Dates	Armament
30 January 1942	2 × Single 75 mm Type 88 AA guns; 10 × Single 75 mm Type 38 field guns; 4 × Single 15 cm Type 89 cannons; 7 × Single 20 mm Type 98 AA cannons
30 July 1944	4 × Single 75 mm Type 88 AA guns; 8 × Single 25 mm Type 96 AA guns; 1 × Single 12 cm short naval gun; 60 Depth charges
14 November 1944	8 × Single 75 mm Type 88 AA guns; 12 × Single 25 mm Type 96 AA guns; 1 × Single 12 cm short naval gun; 60 Depth charges

=== Aviation facilities ===
The ship was fitted with a flight deck above the hull, but had no hangar so the aircraft were stored below the flight deck on the original main deck. Conventional aircraft were able to fly off from her deck but could not land aboard due to lack of landing mechanisms.

In July 1944, KX arresting gear was fitted on the flight deck. The Kokusai Ki-76 (Liaison Aircraft Type 3) and Kayaba Ka-1 were flown off Akitsu Maru, as the former was a small, slow aircraft that could land on its short deck and the latter was an autogyro which could even more easily land on a short deck without assistance.

=== Amphibious operation facilities ===
The ship carried 27 Daihatsu-class landing craft in a well deck that could be flooded, which allowed the landing craft to float free from an open stern gate. The ship could also hold additional craft on davits, but its next-most impressive function was an ability to discharge vehicles from a deck-level parking garage directly onto a pier.

== Service history ==
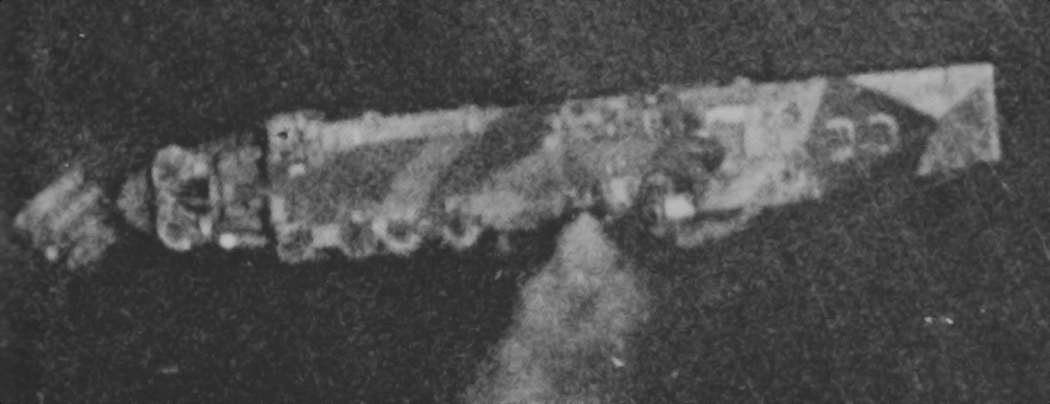
Photographed by an Allied recon aircraft while in Simpson Harbour on 5 November 1942.

The IJA Shipping Section expanded its anti-submarine personnel at the same time as the concept of carrier-based anti-submarine patrol aircraft in mid-to-late 1943. A total of 20 individuals entered the Shimosizu Army Air School around the end of that year as special pilot trainee officers (1st class) for anti-submarine personnel. Training began with basic training using basic training aircraft, followed by familiarization flights of the Ki-76 liaison aircraft, and anti-submarine patrol training.

On 14 November, she departed for Singapore as part of Convoy HI-81. On 15 November 1944, Akitsu Maru was torpedoed by USS Queenfish; One of the torpedoes set off her aft magazine holding depth charges, the explosion shattering the aft portion of the ship; As the seas hit her boilers, they exploded and she sank in the Korean Strait (33°17′N 128°11′E). 2,046 men, mainly of the Imperial Japanese Army's 64th Infantry Regiment, including the commander, were killed. Also 104 Maru-ni EMB explosive motorboats went down with the ship. The escorts rescued 310 survivors.

== Photos ==
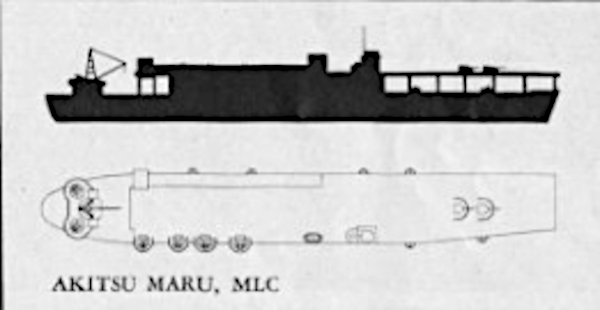
Akitsu Maru profile on a US recognition manual

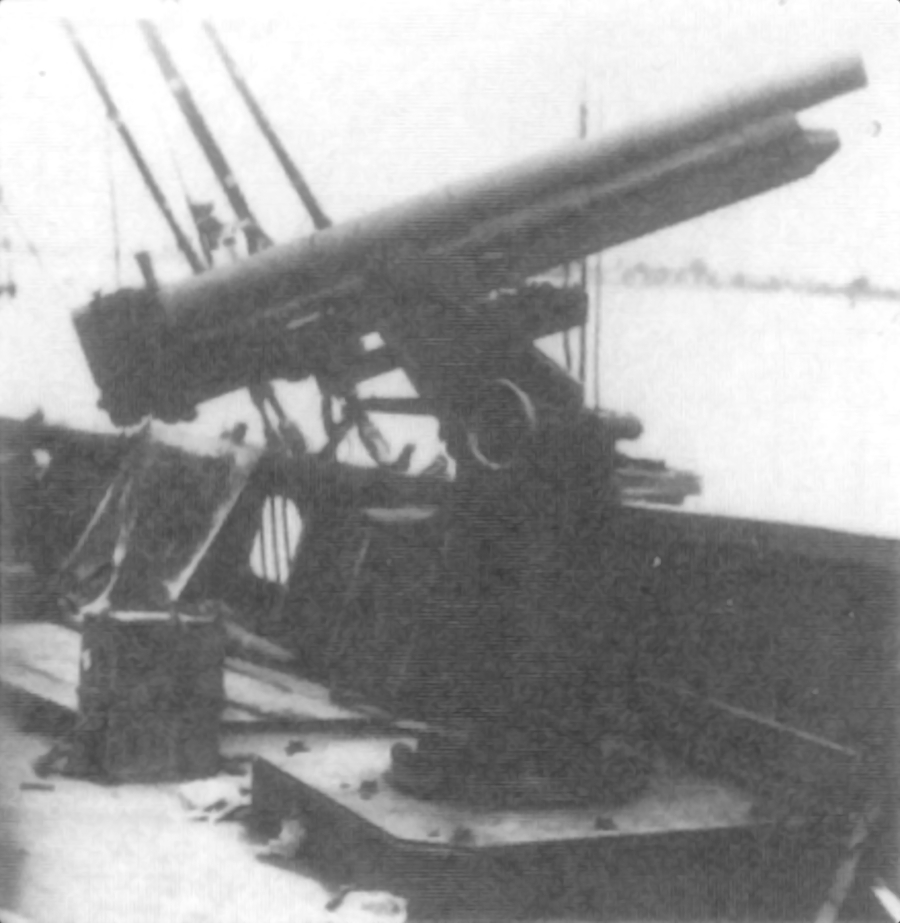
75 mm (3 in) Type 38 field gun on an army ship mount

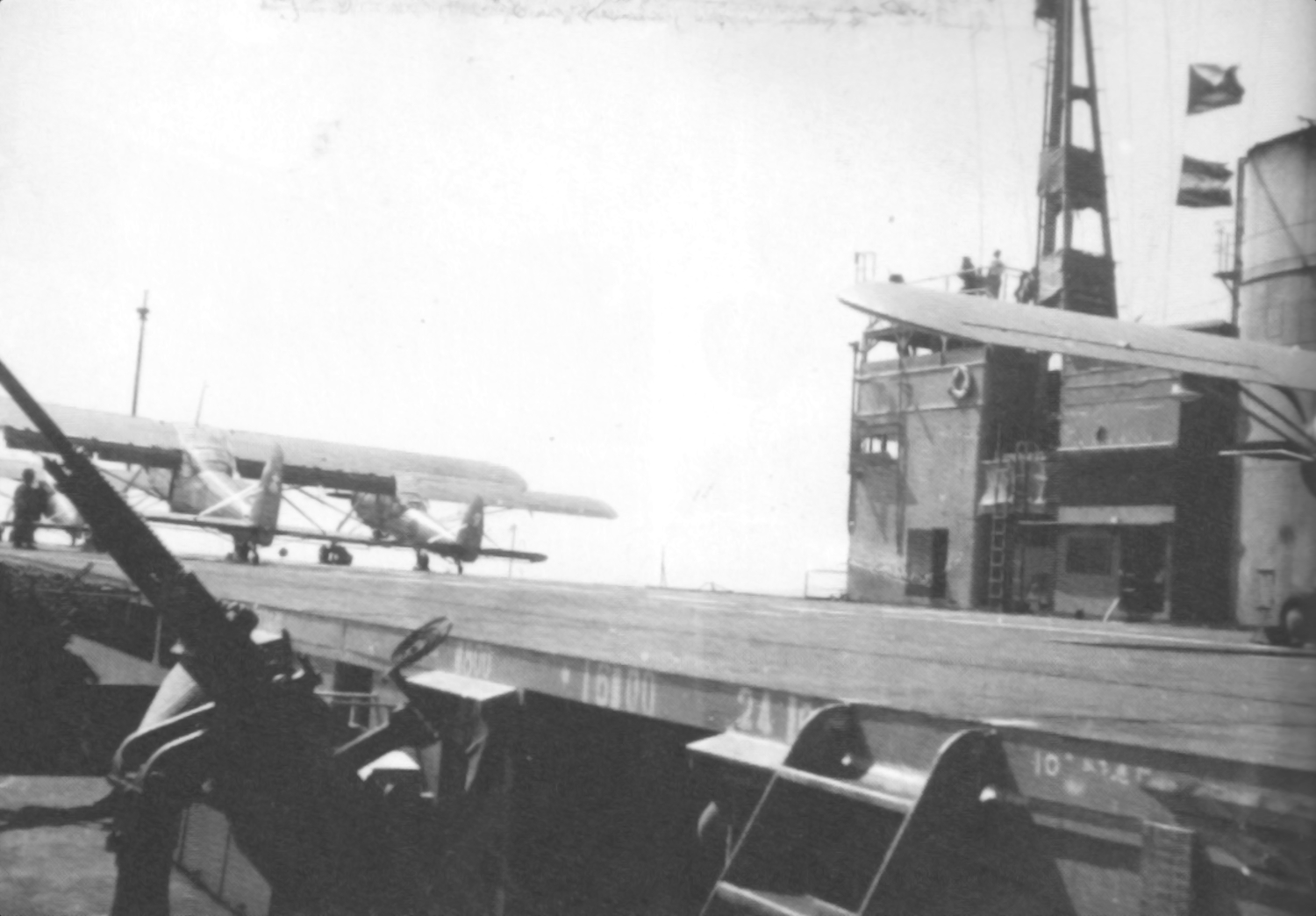
Ki-76 spotter planes on the deck of Akitsu Maru

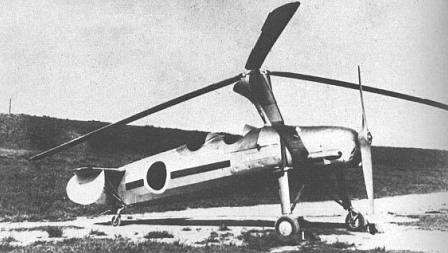
Japanese Kayaba(カ号) Ka-1 autogyro
