= Landing craft carrier =

Type of amphibious warfare ship

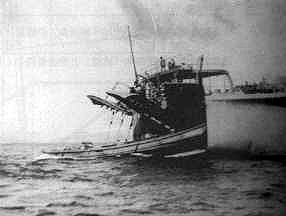
The crew preparing to launch some landing crafts from Shinshū Maru

Landing craft carriers or landing craft depot ships were an innovative type of amphibious warfare ship developed by the Imperial Japanese Army during World War II, capable of deploying multiple landing craft for ground invasions. Their official designation was "Army Special Purpose Ship" (陸軍特殊船, Rikugun tokushu-sen). The prototype was developed in secrecy under the pseudonyms Ryūjō Maru and Fusō Maru using features later adopted by other navies for dock landing ships and amphibious transport docks. Additional ships were built after combat experience validated the concept, but most were completed after the Japanese invasions of the early war, and used primarily as troopships during later operations. Today's amphibious assault ships bear a strong similarity to this concept.

== Prototype ==
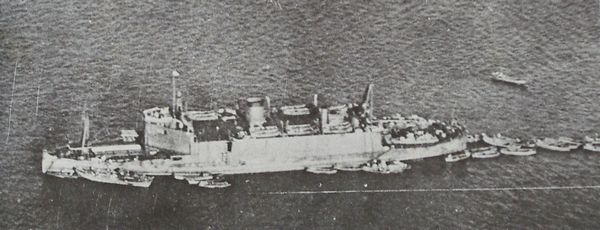
Prototype Shinshū Maru

Shinshū Maru was completed in 1935 and modified in 1936 to include a floodable well dock. She was the world's first ship specifically designed to carry and launch landing craft. She introduced stern and side gates to launch landing craft for the 2,200 soldiers she carried. She demonstrated the advantages of the concept at the invasions of Shanghai, Malaya and Java.

== Type C ==
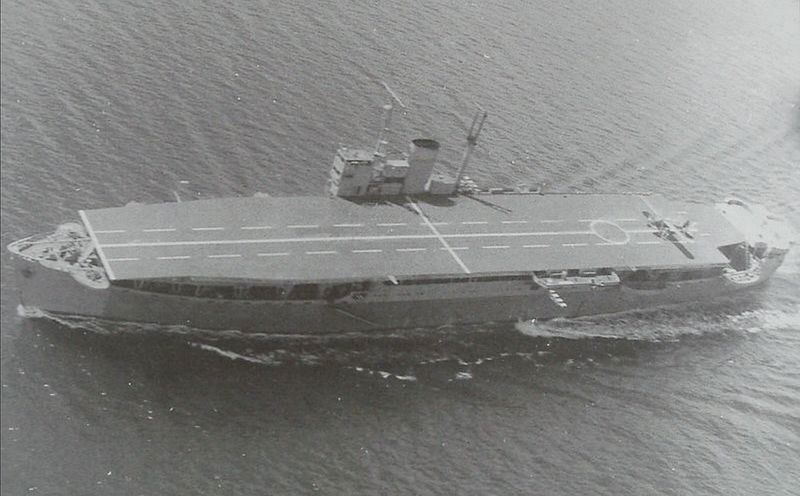
Type C Akitsu Maru

"Type C Special Purpose Ships" (丙型特殊船, Hei-gata Tokushu-sen), landing craft carriers / escort carriers, included a flight deck with a capacity for 28 aircraft, but no hangar deck, since the deck beneath the flight deck was used to carry 25 landing craft launched through stern doors. Akitsu Maru was completed in time to participate in the invasion of Java; but she and the other Type C were thereafter used primarily as ferries to transport short-range aircraft to distant bases. They were completed from 11,800-ton, 20 kn (37 km/h; 23 mph) Nippon Kaiun, K. K. passenger ships under construction by Harima Shipbuilding, with only Akitsu Maru completed as such. It operated two Kayaba Ka-1 autogyros, and several Kokusai Ki-76 STOL liaison aircraft. It were sunk by submarines in 1944.

The others were based on Hitachi Shipbuilding Corporation's standard 8,000-ton, 19 kn (35 km/h; 22 mph) "Type M cargo steam ship" modified to carry twelve Toku Daihatsu-class landing craft launched through stern doors with funnels installed horizontally on the starboard side to accommodate a flight deck, being designated "M Type C Special Purpose Ship" (M丙型特殊船, M Hei-gata Tokushu-sen) (Type MC or M Type C), and with only Kumano Maru being completed before the war's end, also surviving and being used as a repatriation ship.

== Type A ==
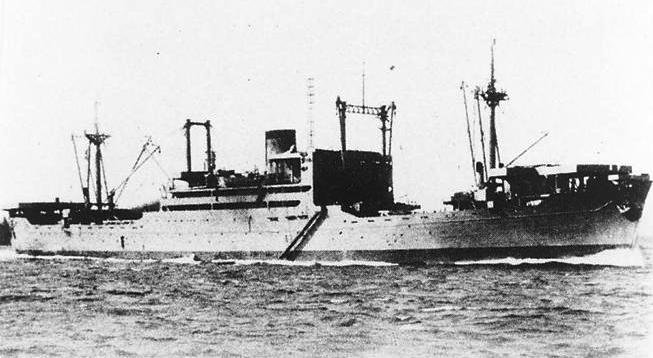
Type A Kibitsu Maru

"Type A Special Purpose Ships" (甲型特殊船, Kō-gata Tokushu-sen), landing craft carriers, were 11,910-ton, 20.8 kn (38.5 km/h; 23.9 mph) diesel-engined ships fitted with stern ramp gates for launching twenty Daihatsu-class landing craft stored in floodable holds. At the time, this launching method was unprecedented. All three were sunk by submarines with very heavy loss of life. Contrary to the Type C, they did not have any flight deck or plane facility, looking like passenger liners instead.

Later production was Hitachi's standard "Type M cargo steam ship" modified to carry twelve Toku-Daihatsu-class landing craft. The landing craft were launched from rails which ran along the main deck (between port and starboard funnels for those carried forward of the superstructure) down to the waterline through large hinged doors at the stern. The type was designated "M Type A Special Purpose Ship" (M甲型特殊船, Kō-gata Tokushu-sen) (Type MA or M Type A). Settsu Maru survived for use as a repatriation ship, her sister ships having been sunk in air raids on Japanese ports.

== Type B ==
"Type B Special Purpose Ship" (乙型特殊船, Otsu-gata Tokushu-sen) were smaller versions of the Type A (also called "Type A (Small Type)" (甲型（小型）, Kō-gata (Kogata))), being only 5,656-ton, 19 kn (35 km/h; 22 mph) steam ships. Only Takatsu Maru was completed, in January 1944, with icebreaker capability, and used conventional cranes rather than gates for handling nine Toku Daihatsu-class landing craft. She was sunk by United States aircraft in Ormoc Bay during the invasion of the Philippines the 10 November 1944.

== List of ships ==
Type	Name		Completion date	Tonage range	Notes
Prototype	Shinshū Maru	神州丸	March 1935	7,000 t	
Type C	Akitsu Maru	あきつ丸	January 1942	10,000 t	Had a flight deck
Type A	Nigitsu Maru	にぎつ丸	March 1943	10,000 t	Was planned as a Type C
Type MC	Kumano Maru	熊野丸	March 1945	10,000 t	Had a flight deck
Type MC	Tokitsu Maru	ときつ丸	incomplete	10,000 t	Was completed as a whaling ship in 1946 and sank in the Antarctic in 1953.
Type A	Mayasan Maru	摩耶山丸	December 1942	10,000 t	
Type A	Tamatsu Maru	玉津丸	January 1944	10,000 t	
Type MA	Kibitsu Maru	吉備津丸	December 1943	10,000 t	
Type MA	Hyūga Maru	日向丸	November 1944	10,000 t	
Type MA	Settsu Maru	摂津丸	January 1945	10,000 t	12 kn (22 km/h; 14 mph) coal-burner
Type B	Takatsu Maru	高津丸	January 1944	5,000 t	Had icebreaker capability
Type B	Unnamed		incomplete	5,000 t	
