= Japanese landing craft carrier Shinshū Maru =

Landing craft carrier of the Imperial Japanese Army (1934–1945)

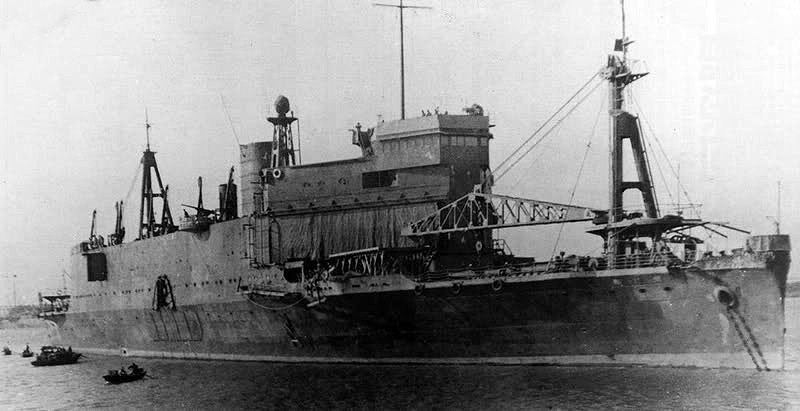
- Shinshū Maru in 1937

History

Empire of Japan
- Name: Shinshū Maru
- Builder: Harima Shipbuilding, Aioi
- Laid down: 8 April 1934
- Launched: 14 March 1935
- Completed: 15 December 1935
- Fate: Sunk 3 January 1945

General characteristics
- Type: Landing craft carrier; Amphibious assault ship
- Displacement: 7,100 tons standard; 8,130 tons full
- Length: 155 m (508 ft 6 in)
- Beam: 19 m (62 ft 4 in)
- Draft: 8.16 m (26 ft 9 in)
- Installed power: Steam turbines; 8,000 shp (6,000 kW)
- Propulsion: 1 shafts, 1 propeller
- Speed: 19 kn (35 km/h; 22 mph)
- Boats & landing craft carried: 29 Daihatsu-class landing craft; 25 Shōhatsu-class landing craft; 4 Sōkōtei-class gunboat
- Troops: 2,200 assault troops
- Complement: 220 officers and enlisted
- Armament: 4 × 75 mm (3 in) Type 88 AA guns; 4 × 20 mm (0.79 in) Type 98 AA guns; 1 × Depth charge track (12 charges)
- Aircraft carried: 26 aircraft (planned)
- Aviation facilities: Hangar and 2 catapults; no flight deck (planned)

Shinshū Maru (神州丸 or 神洲丸) was a ship of the Imperial Japanese Army during World War II. She was the world's first landing craft carrier ship to be designed as such, and a pioneer of modern-day amphibious assault ships. During some of her operations, she was known to have used at least four cover names, R1, GL, MT, and Ryūjō Maru. During her career, she was outfitted with a dummy forefunnel in an effort to disguise her as the submarine tender Taigei, which was converted to the light carrier Ryūhō.

== Design features ==
Shinshū Maru was a significant advance in amphibious warfare, having incorporated numerous innovative features, and as such she was shrouded in a veil of secrecy throughout her existence. She could carry 29 Daihatsu-class landing craft and 25 Shōhatsu-class landing craft, to be launched from a floodable well deck, or two landing craft at a time from stern doors. Additional landing craft could also lifted out of the forward hatch and lowered into the water by crane, as well as lowered from the side via davits. She also carried 4 Sōkōtei-class gunboats, which supported troops in landing operations. Vehicles could also be discharged from a deck-level parking garage directly onto a pier.

It was planned that Shinshū Maru should carry 26 small seaplanes in a hangar within her voluminous superstructure. The aircraft would have been launched by two catapults to support amphibious assaults, but the catapults were removed before completion and the ship never carried any operational planes. However, she still retained the ability to transport and unload aircraft.

These concepts pioneered by Shinshū Maru persist to the current day, in the U.S. Navy's LHA and LHD amphibious assault ships.

== Service history ==
Shinshū Maru was launched in March 1935 and completed in December of that year.

In August 1937, a month after the Marco Polo Bridge incident that sparked the Second Sino-Japanese War and during the Battle of Shanghai, she landed troops in Tianjin, and in November she landed forces in Jinshanwei. In October 1938, she supported the surprise attack in Daya Bay near Hong Kong.

In February 1942, Shinshū Maru participated in the Dutch East Indies campaign, where she was one of the ships sunk by friendly torpedo fire at the Battle of Sunda Strait, but later refloated and towed to a port in Jakarta, Java for temporary repairs on 23 September 1942. Further repairs were conducted in Singapore on 23 December 1942. Shinshū Maru arrived at Ujina, Hiroshima for permanent repairs, starting from May 1943, completed by November of that year.

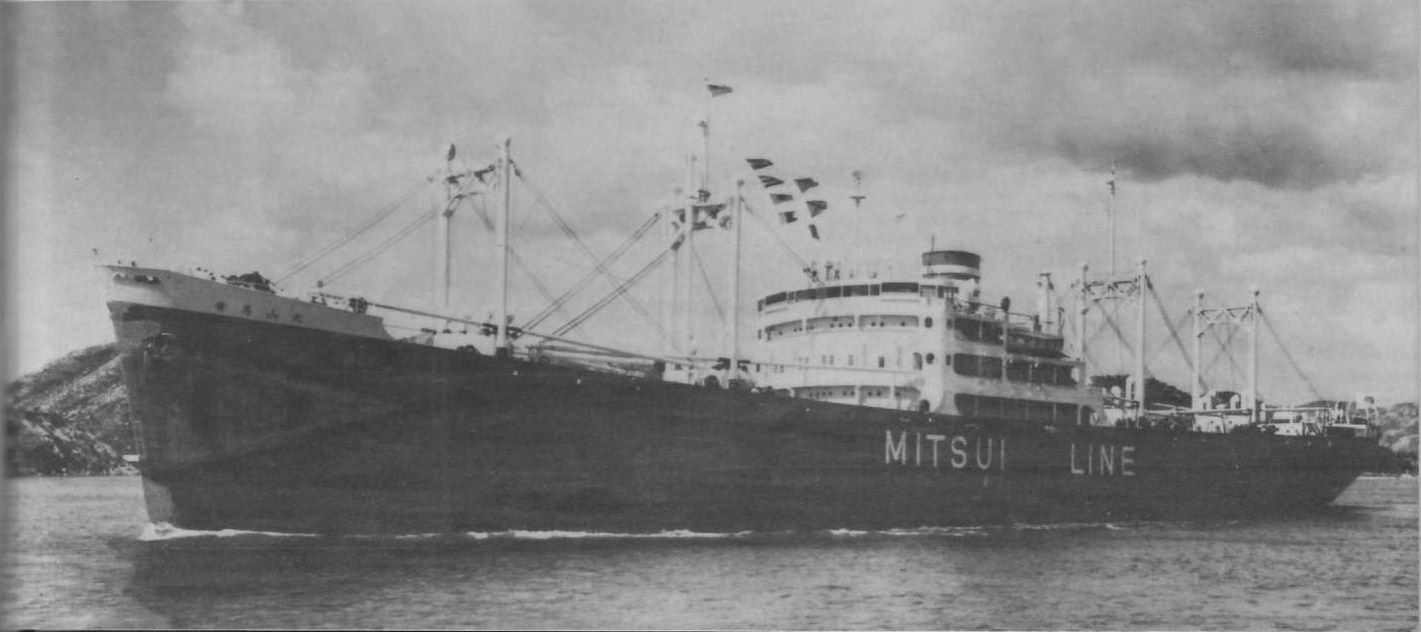
IJA transport Arimasan Maru

On 2 June 1944, the submarine USS Picuda lightly damaged the IJA transport Arimasan Maru. While trying to avoid the tanker, Arimasan Maru collided with Shinshū Maru's stern, causing 12 depth charges to explode, killing 25 men on the Arimasan Maru and 255 soldiers on the Shinshū Maru, as well as damaging Shinshū Maru's stern and rudder. Japanese cruiser Kashii towed the damaged Shinshū Maru to Keelung, Formosa on 3 June 1944 for temporary repairs, completed by late July. Permanent repairs were conducted in Ujina, Hiroshima from 4 August to 23 September.

On 14 November 1944, Shinshū Maru departs Singapore in Convoy HI-81; Which on the next day, was attacked by the submarine USS Queenfish, with Shinshū Maru dropping depth charges during and after the sinking of the Akitsu Maru. After the battle, survivors from the Akitsu Maru and Mayasan Maru were delivered to the Shinshū Maru.

On 2 January 1945, while returning to Takao after a supply mission to Leyte Island, Shinshū Maru was damaged by a torpedo from the submarine USS Aspro in the South of Formosa Straits (at 21°57′N 119°44′E). The next day, at 11:05 (JST), she was attacked by 50 carrier aircraft from Task Force 38. She was hit by 5 bombs and exploded. At about 11:35, the survivors abandoned ship and were pick up by escorts, but 66 gunners, 33 crewmen and 283 soldiers were killed. She sank later in the evening.

== Photos ==
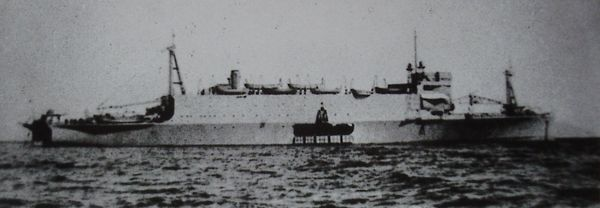
Shinshū Maru in 1934.

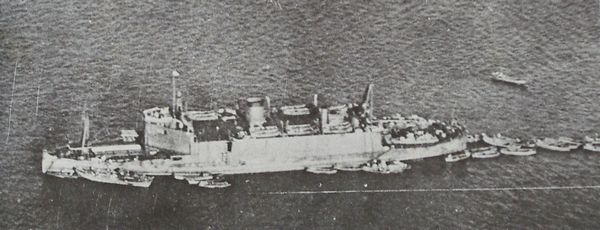
Shinshū Maru on 12 October 1938 at Bias Bay.

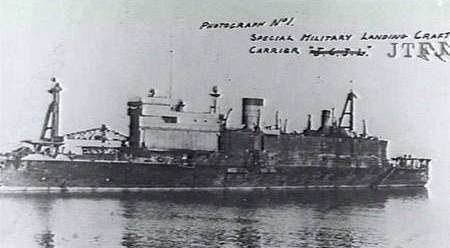
Shinshū Maru

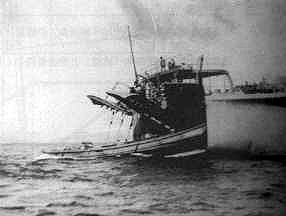
The crew preparing to launch some landing crafts.

== See also ==
- Dock landing ship
- Japanese Special Naval Landing Forces — Part of the Land Forces of the Imperial Japanese Navy
