= Kobeseiko Te-Gō =

Japanese experimental liaison/observation aircraft

Te-Gō
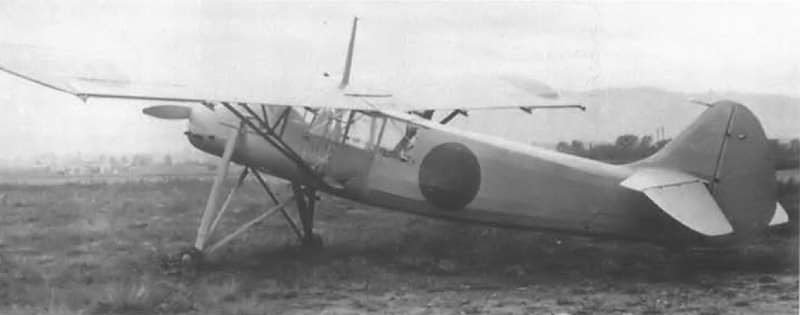

General information
- Type: Liaison/observation
- Manufacturer: Kobe Steel
- Primary user: IJA Air Force
- Number built: 1

History
- First flight: 1942

The Kobeseiko Te-Gō (テ号観測機, Te-gō Kansoku-ki) was a Japanese two-seat STOL experimental reconnaissance aircraft developed by Kobe Steel in 1942 for service in World War II. In accordance with the Army's request, Professor T. Miki, Osaka Imperial University designed and Kobe Seikojo built the Te-Gō. No "Ki" code number was assigned there to since the project was outside the jurisdiction of the Army Aviation Headquarters.

This aircraft was one of two competitors for an Imperial Japanese Army STOL liaison and observation aircraft. Inspired by the Fieseler Storch, Prof. Tetsuo Miki of Osaka University designed this aircraft. Although the aircraft was similar to the Storch, it was not a copy.

Using construction methods common at that time, the wing were made of a wood spar and ribs, covered with fabric/plywood. Automatic slots along the length of the leading edges, large Fowler-type flaps were installed along the trailing edges, and the ailerons were also used as flaps for very short take off. The fuselage had a steel tube frame that was fabric-covered from the cockpit back and the nose was covered with sheet metal. The tail components had the same structure as the wings. A 7.7 mm flexible machine gun was planned for installation at the rear seat to obtain a clear upper rear field of fire.

The aircraft crashed, with extensive damage to the wing and landing gear. Because of this accident, the second submission, the Kayaba Ka-go autogyro, was selected and entered service as the Kayaba Ka-1.

== Specifications (Te-Gō) ==
Data from

General characteristics

- Crew: 2
- Length: 9.8 m (32 ft 2 in)
- Wingspan: 14.3 m (46 ft 11 in)
- Height: 3.1 m (10 ft 2 in)
- Wing area: 20 m^{2} (220 sq ft)
- Empty weight: 950 kg (2,094 lb)
- Gross weight: 1,410 kg (3,109 lb)
- Powerplant: 1 × Kobeseiko-Argus As 10C , 190 kW (250 hp)

Performance

- Maximum speed: 172 km/h (107 mph, 93 kn)
- Range: 375 km (233 mi, 202 nmi)
- Service ceiling: 4,500 m (14,800 ft)

Armament

- Guns: 1 x 7.7 mm (0.303 in) Type 89 machine gun
- Bombs: 2 x 60 kg (132.277 lb) bombs/depth charges (some variants)

== See also ==
Aircraft of comparable role, configuration, and era

- Fieseler Fi 156
- Kokusai Ki-76 "Stella"

Related lists

- List of military aircraft of Japan
