= Sōkōtei-class gunboat =

1928–45 Imperial Japanese Army gunboat

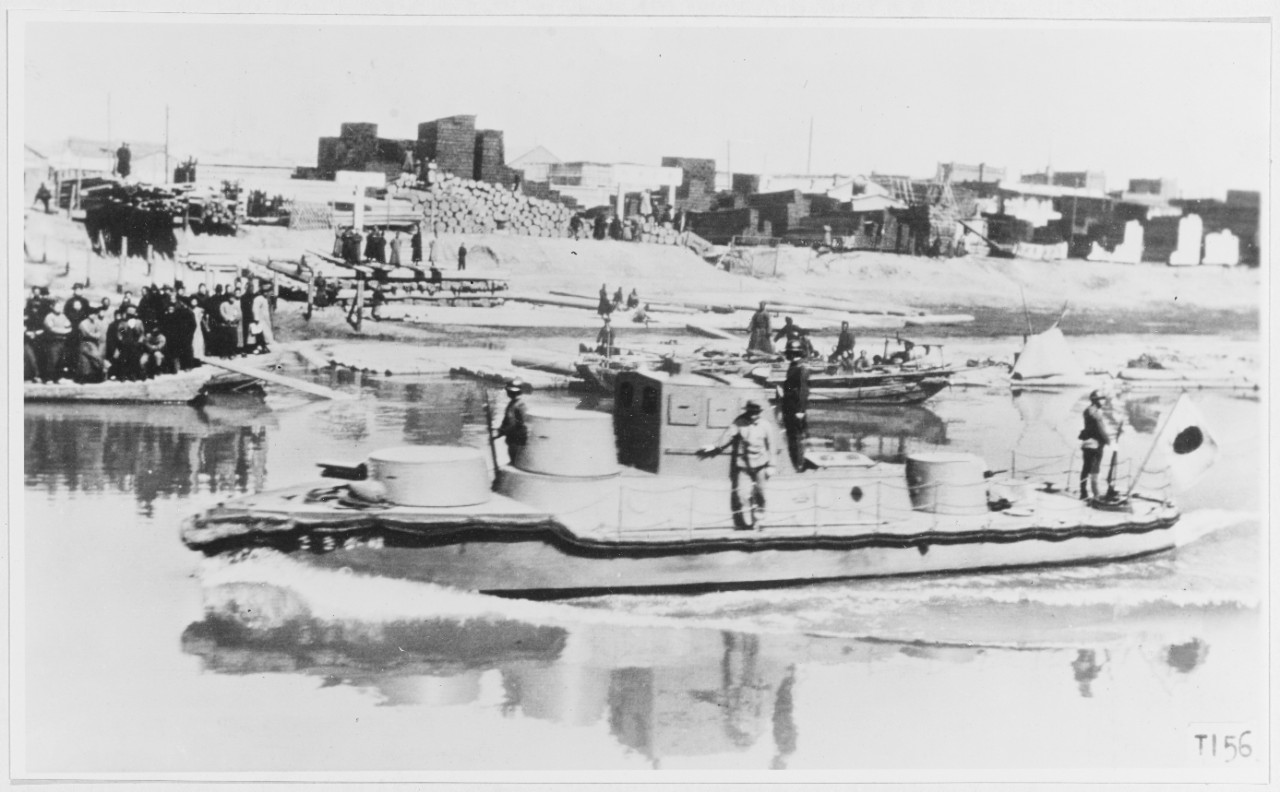
- Japanese armored boat Sakigake (さきがけ) on river patrol in China

Class overview
- Name: Sōkōtei class
- Operators: Imperial Japanese Army
- Succeeded by: ST-class
- In service: 1928–1945
- Completed: 56

General characteristics (based on 1933 design)
- Type: armored boat
- Tonnage: 17.5 tons
- Length: 15.5 m (50 ft 10 in) o/a
- Beam: 3.5 m (11 ft 6 in)
- Draught: 1.65 m (5 ft 5 in)
- Installed power: 350 hp (260 kW)
- Propulsion: Diesel engine
- Speed: 11.5 knots (21.3 km/h; 13.2 mph)
- Armament: 1 x Type 90 57 mm tank gun; 2 x Type 89 7.7 mm machine guns; 1 x smoke discharger
- Armour: 6 mm

The Sōkōtei (装甲艇, lit. "armored boat") class or AB-tei class was a type of armored gunboat used by the Imperial Japanese Army from 1928 to 1945 in the Second Sino-Japanese War and World War II. It was constructed of a metal hull and powered by a diesel engine. It was designated the "Type C" landing craft by the United States.

== History ==
During the 1920s, the Imperial Japanese Army developed equipment for a complete suite of capabilities during amphibious assaults. They developed the 10-meter (33 ft) Shohatsu and the 14-meter (46 ft) Daihatsu classes of landing craft; a ship-to-shore communications boat, the 11-meter (36 ft) HB-O (ja:高速艇乙); a reconnaissance gunboat, the 14.4-meter (47 ft) HB-K (ja:高速艇甲); and the world's first landing craft carrier (Shinshū Maru). The armored boat was developed to provide close-in support for amphibious operations and was transported the same as the other landing craft.

The prototype boat was completed in 1928 (Showa 3) and named Sakigake (さきがけ or "Pioneer" in Japanese). It was 14.4 meters, displaced 16 tons, ran on gasoline, and was armed with two 6.5 mm Type 38 machine guns (jp:三八式機関銃) and one 37 mm "Sniper" gun (jp:狙撃砲). In 1930 (Showa 5), the second boat, Kachidoki (勝鬨 or "Battle Cry" in Japanese), was completed. It was larger at 20 meters and 20 tons of displacement, ran on diesel fuel, and its armament was upgraded to one 57 mm Type 90 tank gun (jp:九〇式五糎七戦車砲) and two 7.7 mm Type 89 swivel guns (jp:八九式旋回機関銃). In 1932, Kachidoki saw action during the landing operation at Shanghai during the January 28 incident.

The third boat was reduced in size to 15.5 meters with 17.5 tons displacement while keeping the same armament as Kachidoki. Armored Boat No. 3 (AB-3) was chosen as the final design and in 1933, 23 additional boats were built (designated AB-4 through AB-26).

In 1937, the design was again changed increasing the length to 17.5 meters (57 ft) with 20 tons displacement and the speed increased to 14 knots (26 km/h; 16 mph); ten boats of this configuration were built. In 1938, the design was reduced in length to 16.5 meters (54 ft) with 20 tons displacement and a second 57 mm tank gun added; 11 boats of this configuration were built by Osaka Iron Works (大阪鉄工所, Ōsaka Tekkosho). In 1939, the displacement of the ship was reduced to 16.5 tons and the second 57 mm tank gun removed; 19 boats of this configuration were built by Osaka Iron Works.

After the Battle of the Bismarck Sea (2–4 March 1943) where eight transports and four destroyers were lost to enemy air attacks, the Japanese increasingly relied on convoys of barges escorted by armored boats to replenish or evacuate their forces. A typical configuration allowing for the transport of 1,000 men, 300 miles, would consist of 2 armored boats as escort for 2 special large landing barges (Toku Daihatsu), 40 large landing barges (Daihatsu), and 15 small landing barges (Shohatsu). Due to her slow speed, she was eventually outclassed by the American patrol torpedo boat and a Japanese equivalent was developed (ja:カロ艇).

She is not to be confused with the ST-class armored boats built by Mitsubishi Heavy Industries Ltd. at their Yokohama Shipyard for riverine patrol in China.
