= USS Hake =

Submarine of the United States

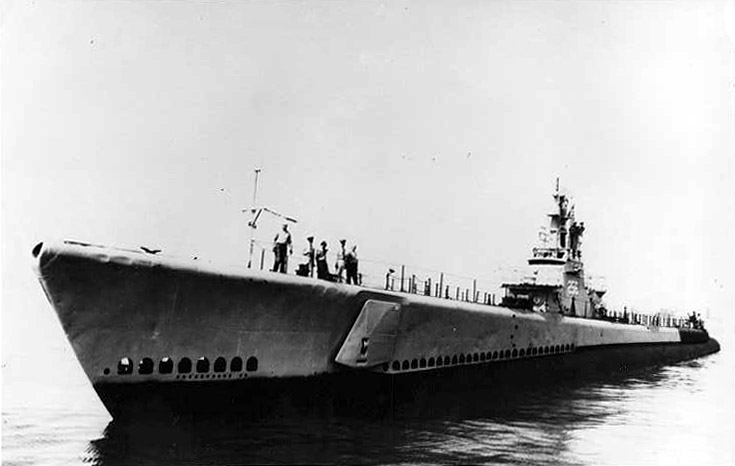
- Hake (SS-256), c. 1945.

History

United States
- Name: USS Hake
- Namesake: Hake
- Builder: Electric Boat Company, Groton, Connecticut
- Laid down: 1 November 1941
- Launched: 17 July 1942
- Sponsored by: Mrs. F. J. Fletcher
- Commissioned: 30 October 1942
- Decommissioned: 13 July 1946
- Stricken: 19 April 1968
- Fate: Sold for scrap, 5 December 1972

General characteristics
- Class & type: Gato-class diesel-electric submarine
- Displacement: 1,525 long tons (1,549 t) surfaced; 2,424 long tons (2,463 t) submerged
- Length: 311 ft 9 in (95.02 m)
- Beam: 27 ft 3 in (8.31 m)
- Draft: 17 ft 0 in (5.18 m) maximum
- Propulsion: 4 × Hooven-Owens-Rentschler (H.O.R.) diesel engines driving electrical generators; 2 × 126-cell Sargo batteries; 4 × high-speed General Electric electric motors with reduction gears; two propellers; 5,400 shp (4.0 MW) surfaced; 2,740 shp (2.0 MW) submerged
- Speed: 21 kn (39 km/h) surfaced; 9 kn (17 km/h) submerged
- Range: 11,000 nmi (20,000 km) surfaced at 10 kn (19 km/h)
- Endurance: 48 hours at 2 kn (4 km/h) submerged; 75 days on patrol
- Test depth: 300 ft (90 m)
- Complement: 6 officers, 54 enlisted
- Armament: 10 × 21 inch (533 mm) torpedo tubes; (six forward, four aft); 24 torpedoes; 1 × 3 in (76 mm)/50 caliber deck gun; Bofors 40 mm and Oerlikon 20 mm cannon

USS Hake (SS/AGSS-256) was a Gato-class submarine of the United States Navy that served during World War II.

== Construction and commissioning ==
Hake′s keel was laid down by the Electric Boat Company at Groton, Connecticut. She was launched 17 July 1942, sponsored by Mrs. Martha Richards Fletcher, wife of Rear Admiral Frank Jack Fletcher, and commissioned 30 October 1942.

== Operational history ==
=== Atlantic war patrols, April – July 1943 ===
Hake departed for shakedown off New London soon after commissioning and after bringing crew and equipment up to fighting efficiency began her first war patrol from New London 8 April 1943. Her mission on this patrol was to search out and destroy German submarines in the North Atlantic, but no contacts were gained and she arrived Helensburgh, Scotland, to terminate the patrol 29 April. She departed for her second patrol, off the Azores and again on antisubmarine patrol, 27 May 1943 and after encountering few submarines returned to New London 17 July.

=== Third and fourth war patrols, December 1943 – April 1944 ===
Newly assigned to the Pacific, Hake departed New London 25 August 1943 for San Diego, via the Panama Canal. After a training period off the California coast, she sailed for the western Pacific 6 December. Hake armed at Pearl Harbor and departed for her third war patrol 27 December 1943. She sighted the transport Nigitsu Maru en route to Japan 11 January 1944 and after a day-long chase to gain position sank her the next day. The submarine then continued to her cruising grounds off the Philippine Islands, patrolling off Luzon and later moving south to Mindanao.

The night of 26 January she attacked a tanker, damaged her, and in turn suffered considerable damage from depth charge attacks before making her escape. Hake next encountered three ships with two escorts 1 February. With the three targets in a line of bearing after a perfect approach, the submarine launched a spread of six torpedoes, sinking two of the three, Tacoma Maru, and Nanka Maru. The attack achieved complete surprise and Hake was not attacked by the screening vessels. She then departed for Fremantle, Australia, terminating the patrol there 20 February 1944.

Hake's fourth war patrol was spent in the South China Sea near Singapore, following departure from Fremantle 18 March 1944. She encountered her first target 27 March off southwest Borneo, and it was a submariner's dream: an unescorted tanker. Two torpedoes sent the ship, Yamamizu Maru, to the bottom. After an attack on convoy Hi-55 during the night of 1 April in which Hake damaged several ships, she battled escorts and searched for more transports until 30 April, when she arrived at Fremantle.

=== Fifth and sixth war patrols, May – September 1944 ===
For her fifth war patrol, commencing 23 May, Hake was assigned the area southwest of Mindanao. Her duty was to attack shipping and to act as a picket to alert American forces to the approach of the Japanese fleet, which was expected to sortie from Tawi Tawi to the Mariana Islands. Sighting destroyer Kazagumo 8 June, the sub closed for the attack and succeeded in sinking her adversary, but fierce attacks prevented her from sinking any of the accompanying destroyers. Hake also succeeded in sinking two transports during this patrol. Cargo ship Kinshu Maru was sunk 17 June after four hits, and a heavily laden troop transport was sunk 3 days later at the entrance to Davao Gulf. She returned to Fremantle 11 July 1944. During this patrol, Hake was the witness to the loss of USS Harder (SS-257).

Hake returned to her patrol area off the Philippines, departing 5 August. During this, her sixth war patrol, she attacked another destroyer, damaging it, but made few additional contacts because of extremely heavy air and surface patrolling by Japanese forces. She arrived at Fremantle Harbor 24 September 1944.

=== Seventh, eighth, and ninth war patrols, October 1944 – August 1945 ===
Departing 20 October for her seventh war patrol, Hake encountered few contacts in her patrol area. Operating with Hardhead and the ill-fated Growler, which was lost on the patrol, Hake spent a harrowing 16 hours 7 – 8 November, counting nearly 150 depth charges and sustaining considerable damage.

On 19 November Hake torpedoed Japanese light cruiser Isuzu west of Corregidor, damaging her rudder.

Hake was subsequently sent on a special mission off Panay Island, where she rendezvoused with Filipino guerrillas to bring on board 29 U.S. aviators shot down in recent air attacks. Her valuable cargo safe, Hake returned to Australia, arriving Fremantle 16 December.

Hake departed Fremantle for her eighth war patrol 12 January 1945. After searching the South China Sea (now almost denuded of targets) for almost a month, she headed for San Francisco, arriving 13 March. After overhaul she departed San Francisco some 2 months later and began her ninth war patrol in the Pacific 20 July 1945. Hake acted as lifeguard ship for the air strikes against Japan, and after the surrender had the distinction of being 1 of 12 submarines to witness the historic ceremonies on board the battleship Missouri in Tokyo Bay.

=== Post-war service ===
Following the signing, Hake started on the long trek back to New London, via the Panama Canal. She decommissioned at New London 13 July 1946, entered the reserve fleet, and was taken out of reserve 15 October 1956 to serve as a Reserve Training Ship for 4th Naval District at Philadelphia, Pa. Her classification was changed to AGSS-256, auxiliary submarine, 6 November 1962. She continued to serve out of commission as a training ship for reservists at Philadelphia until she was struck from the Navy List 1 March 1967 to be sold.

Hake received seven battle stars for her service in World War II.

== Bibliography ==
- Wright, C. C. (2005). "Question 17/03: Replacement of US Submarine Diesel Engines". Warship International. XLII (4): 431–434. ISSN 0043-0374.
