= Awa Maru (1899 ship) =

Japanese ocean liner

History

Japan
- Name: Awa Maru
- Operator: Nippon Yusen (NYK)
- Builder: Mitsubishi Shipbuilding & Engineering Co. Nagasaki, Japan
- Yard number: 102
- Laid down: 20 June 1898
- Launched: 27 July 1899
- Completed: 14 November 1899
- Out of service: 1930
- Fate: Scrapped

General characteristics
- Tonnage: 6,309 gross register tons (GRT)
- Length: 135.6 m (445 ft)
- Beam: 15.1 m (50 ft)
- Speed: 13 knots (24 km/h)

The Awa Maru (阿波丸) was a Japanese ocean liner owned by Nippon Yusen Kaisha. The ship was built in 1899 by Mitsubishi Shipbuilding & Engineering Co. at Nagasaki, Japan.

The ship's name comes in part from the ancient province of Awa. This turn-of-the-20th-century Awa Maru was the first NYK vessel to bear this name. A second mid-century, 11,249 ton Awa Maru was completed in 1943.

== History ==
The ship was built by Mitsubishi at Nagasaki on the southern island of Kyushu. The keel was laid down on June 20, 1898. The Awa Maru was launched on July 27, 1899; and she was completed November 14, 1899.

The ship sailed the route between Japan and England, By 1914, the ship settled into a regular schedule of sailings between Yokohama and Seattle. and she would be taken out of service in 1930.

On December 27, 1906, the Awa Maru ran aground on the West Scar Rocks off Redcar. There were no deaths, thanks to the efforts of the Redcar lifeboat crew and local fishermen, and after eighteen days the vessel was successfully refloated.

Arguably the most important voyage of this Awa Maru began when it left Yokohama on February 14, 1912, carrying 3,020 cherry trees of twelve varieties. These fragile tree slips were bound for Seattle where they were trans-shipped across the North American continent via insulated freight cars. On arrival in Washington, D.C., these trees they would form the genesis of the National Cherry Blossom Festival.
