= Type 96 and Type 97 150 mm infantry mortar =

World War II Japanese mortars

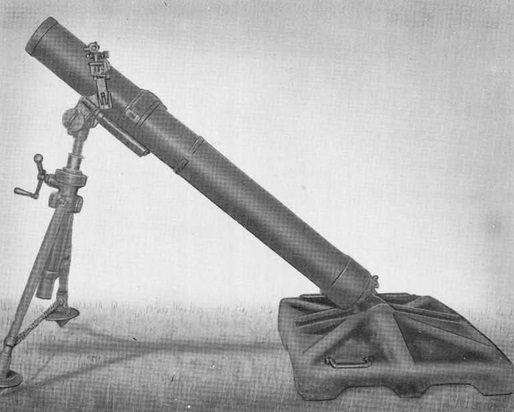

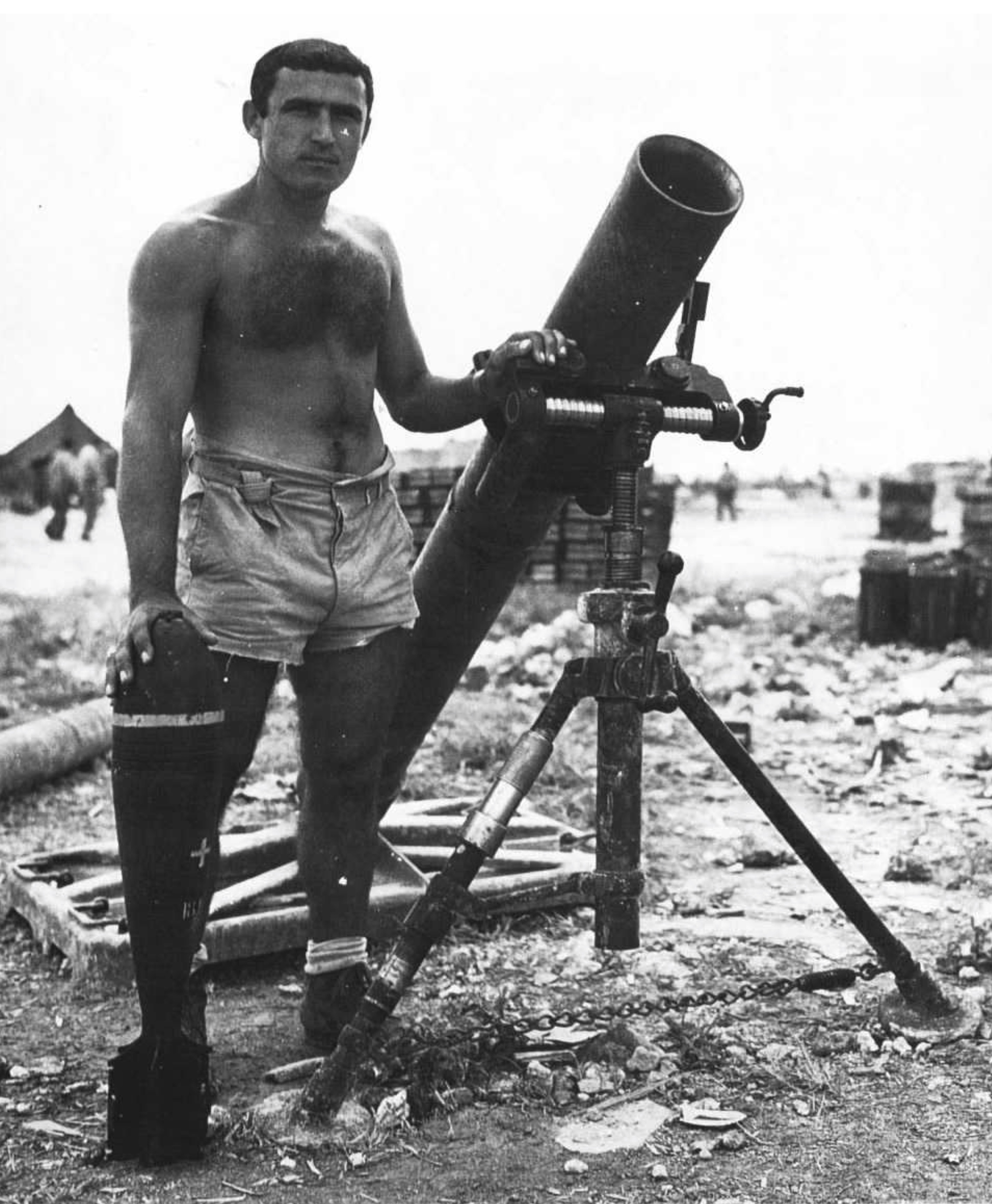

The Type 96 and Type 97 were Japanese 150 mm (5.9 in) caliber mortars used during the Second World War. The Type 96 designation was given to this mortar as it was accepted in the year 2596 of the Japanese calendar (1936).

Japanese 90 mm (3.5 in), 120 mm (4.7 in), and 150 mm (5.9 in) mortars were labeled as "trench mortars" and were effectively controlled by Imperial Japanese Army artillery units instead of infantry units. Initially Japanese trench mortars where primarily developed as chemical-delivery weapons, but would mainly see service in conventional roles during the Greater East Asia War.

== Design ==
The Imperial Japanese Army initially designed a 150 mm (5.9 in) trench mortar in the late 1920s which was accepted as the Type 90 150 mm (5.9 in) trench mortar. Production never commenced outside of two units in 1932.

The Type 97 150 mm (5.9 in) mortar was essentially the Type 96 mortar but with the recoil mechanism eliminated. Both models where produced side-by-side as the Type 97 mortar proved to be lighter but less stable than the slightly older Type 96 mortar. A short barrel 150 mm (5.9 in) mortar, the Type 99 experimental short trench mortar was trialed, but range was considered to be unsatisfactory at 220 meters.

== Uses ==
The Type 96 150 mm (5.9 in) mortar was never encountered by American or British troops, although it was used in China. The Type 97 150 mm (5.9 in) mortar was notably used in both Iwo Jima and China. Both types were produced from 1937 to late 1943, with records indicating a total of 201 units delivered to the Imperial Japanese Army. Both types were nominally replaced by the lighter and more portable Type 2 120 mm (4.7 in) trench mortar.

Those mortars were also used as anti-submarine mortars for the Army's warships. Ships like the landing craft carriers were equipped with two single 150 mm (5.9 in) mortars on platforms at the bow and stern. They fired 27-kilogram (60 lb) shells to a range of 4,500 metres (4,900 yd).

== Specifications ==
Designation	Type 96	Type 97
Number Built	201 (mix of Type 96 and Type 97)	
Barrel length	8.6 cal	8.6 cal
Elevation	+45° to +80°	
Shell weight	Reported between 23.8–25.6 kg (52–56 lb)	
Muzzle velocity	214 m/s (700 ft/s)	
Weight	722 kg (1,592 lb)	342 kg (754 lb)
Range	3.9 km (2.4 mi)	
