= MV Awa Maru =

Japanese ocean liner (1942–1945)

- Awa Maru

History

Japan
- Name: Awa Maru
- Operator: Nippon Yusen (NYK)
- Builder: Mitsubishi Shipbuilding & Engineering Co. Nagasaki, Japan
- Yard number: 770
- Laid down: 10 July 1941
- Launched: 24 August 1942
- Completed: 5 March 1943
- In service: 1943
- Out of service: 1 April 1945
- Fate: Torpedoed and sunk 1 April 1945

General characteristics
- Tonnage: 11,249 GRT
- Length: 153 m (502 ft)
- Beam: 20 m (66 ft)
- Propulsion: 2 diesels, twin screws
- Speed: 17 knots (31 km/h; 20 mph)

Awa Maru (阿波丸) was a Japanese ocean liner owned by Nippon Yusen Kaisha. The ship was built in 1941–1943 by Mitsubishi Shipbuilding & Engineering Co. at Nagasaki, Japan. The vessel was designed for passenger service, but the onset of war by the time work was completed changed requirements, and she was requisitioned by the Imperial Japanese Navy. While sailing as a relief ship under Red Cross auspices in 1945, she was torpedoed by USS Queenfish, resulting in the death of all but one of the 2,004 people aboard.

The ship's name came in part from the ancient province of Awa at the east end of Shikoku, in what is now Tokushima Prefecture. This mid-century Awa Maru was the second NYK vessel to bear this name. A 6,309-ton Awa Maru was completed in 1899 and taken out of service in 1930.

== History ==
The ship was built by Mitsubishi at Nagasaki on the southern island of Kyushu. The keel was laid down on 10 July 1941. Awa Maru was launched on 24 August 1942; and she was completed on 5 March 1943.

== Pacific War ==
The Awa Maru was requisitioned and refitted for auxiliary use by the Imperial Japanese Navy during World War II. On 26 March 1943, Awa Maru left Japan carrying 3,000 tons of ammunition for Singapore. Awa Maru traveled to Singapore with convoy Hi-3 in July 1943, and returned to Japan with convoy Hi-14 in November. She again traveled to Singapore with convoy Hi-41 in February 1944, and returned to Japan with convoy Hi-48 in March. She then transported troops to Burma with convoy Hi-63 in May, and returned to Japan with convoy Hi-66 in June.

Awa Maru was attached to convoy Hi-71 carrying Operation Shō reinforcements to the Philippines. The convoy sailed into the South China Sea from Mako naval base in the Pescadores on 17 August, and was discovered that evening by USS Redfish. Redfish assembled other American submarines USS Rasher, Bluefish and Spadefish for a radar-assisted wolfpack attack in typhoon conditions on the night of 18/19 August. Awa Maru was one of several ships torpedoed that night, but beached at Port Currimao to avoid sinking, and was towed to Manila on 21 August. Awa Maru was repaired in Singapore, and returned to Japan with convoy Hi-84 in January 1945.

=== Sinking ===
In 1945 the Awa Maru was employed as a Red Cross relief ship, purportedly carrying vital supplies to American and Allied prisoners of war (POWs) in Japanese custody. Under the Relief for POWs agreement, she was supposed to be given safe passage by Allied forces, and Allied commanders issued orders to that effect.

Having delivered her supplies, Awa Maru took on several hundred stranded merchant marine officers, military personnel, diplomats and civilians at Singapore. In addition, there were stories that the ship carried treasure worth approximately US$5 billion: 40 tonnes of gold, 12 (or 2) tonnes of platinum (valued at about $58 million), and 150,000 carats (30 kg) of diamonds and other strategic materials. Less dramatic and more credible sources identify the likely cargo as nickel and rubber. The ship was observed in Singapore being loaded with a cargo of rice in sacks; however, that evening the docks were reportedly cleared and troops were brought in to first unload the rice and then re-load her with contraband.

Her voyage also corresponded with the last possible location of the fossil remains of Peking Man, which were in Singapore at the time and were, on their own, priceless in value. There are various theories regarding the disappearance of a number of Peking Man fossils during World War II; one such theory is that the bones sank with the Awa Maru in April 1945.

The ship departed Singapore on 28 March, but on 1 April was intercepted late at night in the Taiwan Strait by the American submarine USS Queenfish, which mistook her for a destroyer. The Awa Maru had been guaranteed safe passage as a relief ship carrying Red Cross supplies to prisoner of war camps. Under the agreed rules, she disclosed to the Allies the route she would take back to Japan. Her original route was promulgated through a minefield, an apparent ruse to draw attackers into the mined area. The area was known to be mined, and would have been avoided at any rate. Her final route avoided the mines.

The torpedoes of the Queenfish sank the ship. Only one of the 2,004 passengers and crew, captain's steward Kantora Shimoda, survived. As the Awa Maru sank "she was carrying a cargo of rubber, lead, tin, and sugar. Seventeen hundred merchant seamen and 80 first-class passengers, all survivors of ship sinkings, were being transported from Singapore to Japan....[The] survivor said no Red Cross supplies were aboard, they having been previously unloaded."

== Aftermath ==
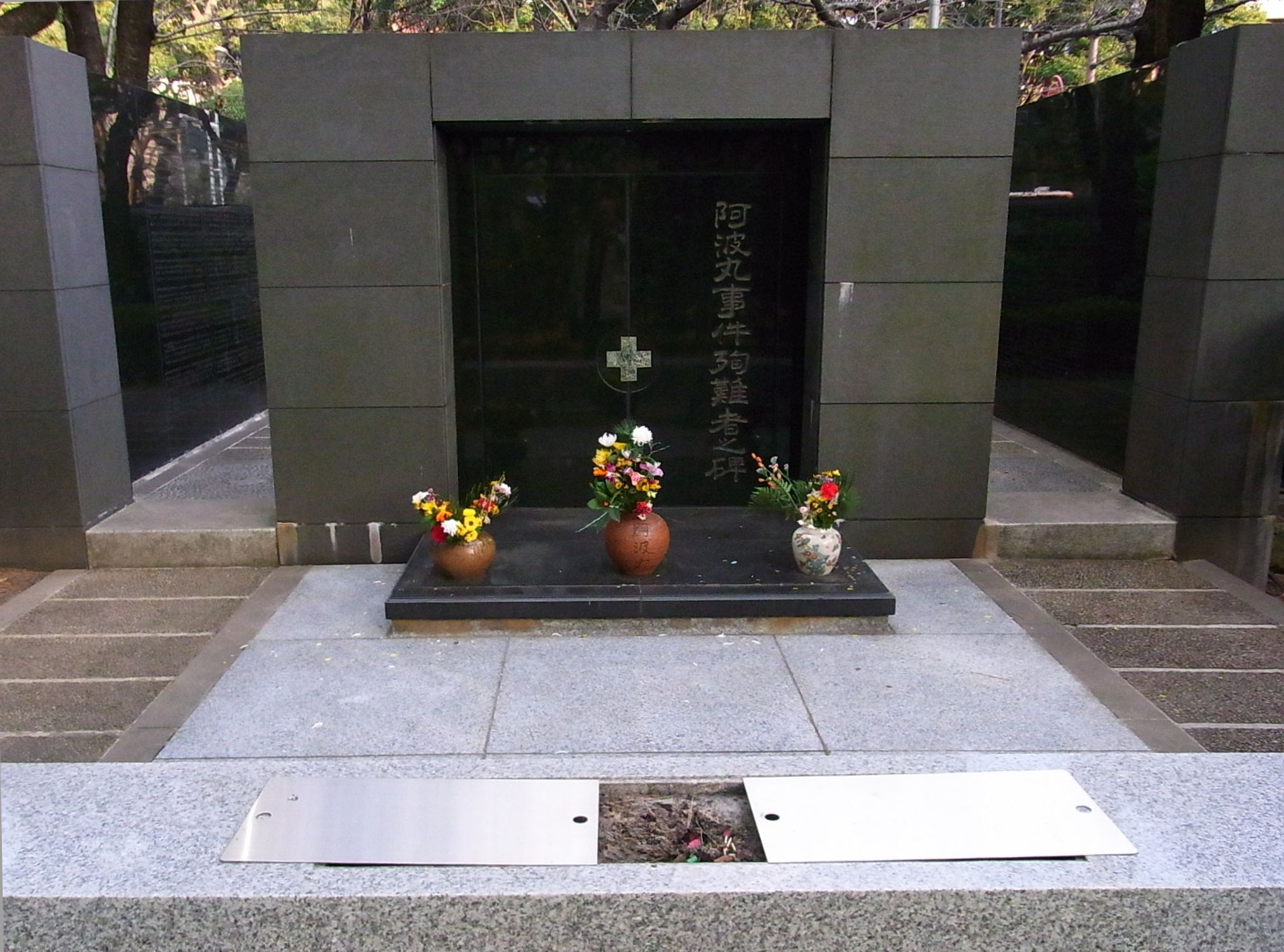
Monument to the victims of the Awa Maru incident in the grounds of Zojo-ji Temple

The United States was immediately concerned for the safety of U.S. POWs who might be subjected to a Japanese reprisal. Fleet Admiral Chester W. Nimitz, commander-in-chief of the U.S. Pacific Fleet, intended to publicize that the ship had been sunk by a Japanese mine. The Chief of Naval Operations, Fleet Admiral Ernest J. King, was furious at the attack and ordered the Queenfish recalled to Guam. Her commanding officer, Commander Charles Elliott Loughlin, was relieved and informed that he would face a general court-martial.

Vice Admiral Charles A. Lockwood, commanding all submarines in the Pacific Fleet, pleaded Loughlin's case with King and Secretary of the Navy James Forrestal, saying the order for the Awa Maru's safe passage had been ambiguous, though neither were placated. Commander Loughlin was found guilty of negligence in obeying orders and issued a letter of admonition, considered a lenient sentence. The ruling angered Nimitz, who issued letters of reprimand to members of the court martial, a higher-tier punishment, but did not put it on their records. Loughlin was barred from future commands by King, but was eventually promoted after King's retirement.

The U.S. Government offered, via neutral Switzerland, to replace the Awa Maru with a similar ship. Japan demanded full indemnification.

On the very day of Japan's surrender, 14 August 1945, Foreign Minister Togo forwarded a message to the United States through Bern, Switzerland, demanding payment of 196,115,000 yen ($45 million) for the loss of 2,003 lives; 30,370,000 yen ($7.25 million) for the goods aboard the Awa Maru; and various other claims, for a total demand of 227,286,600 yen or approximately $52.5 million....No gold bullion is mentioned in the message.

The Japanese bill was never paid, and in 1949 the matter was closed.

In 1980, the People's Republic of China launched one of the biggest salvage efforts on a single ship in history. They had successfully located and identified the wreck site in 1977 and were convinced that the vessel was carrying billions in gold and jewels. After approximately 5 years and $100 million spent on the effort, the search was finally called off. No treasure was found. However, several personal artifacts were returned to Japan.

In the aftermath of the salvage attempt, the NSA scoured thousands of intercepted communications to determine what exactly happened to the treasure. From the communications, they determined that the treasure was not to be taken back to Japan. It was to be sent from Japan to Singapore where it would then be delivered to Thailand. The gold was successfully delivered and the Awa Maru was reloaded with a cargo of tin and rubber for the return trip to Japan.

== See also ==
- Yasukuni Shrine
- List by death toll of ships sunk by submarines
- List of maritime disasters in World War II
- MV Wilhelm Gustloff
