= Japanese landing craft carrier Nigitsu Maru =

Escort carrier of the Imperial Japanese Army

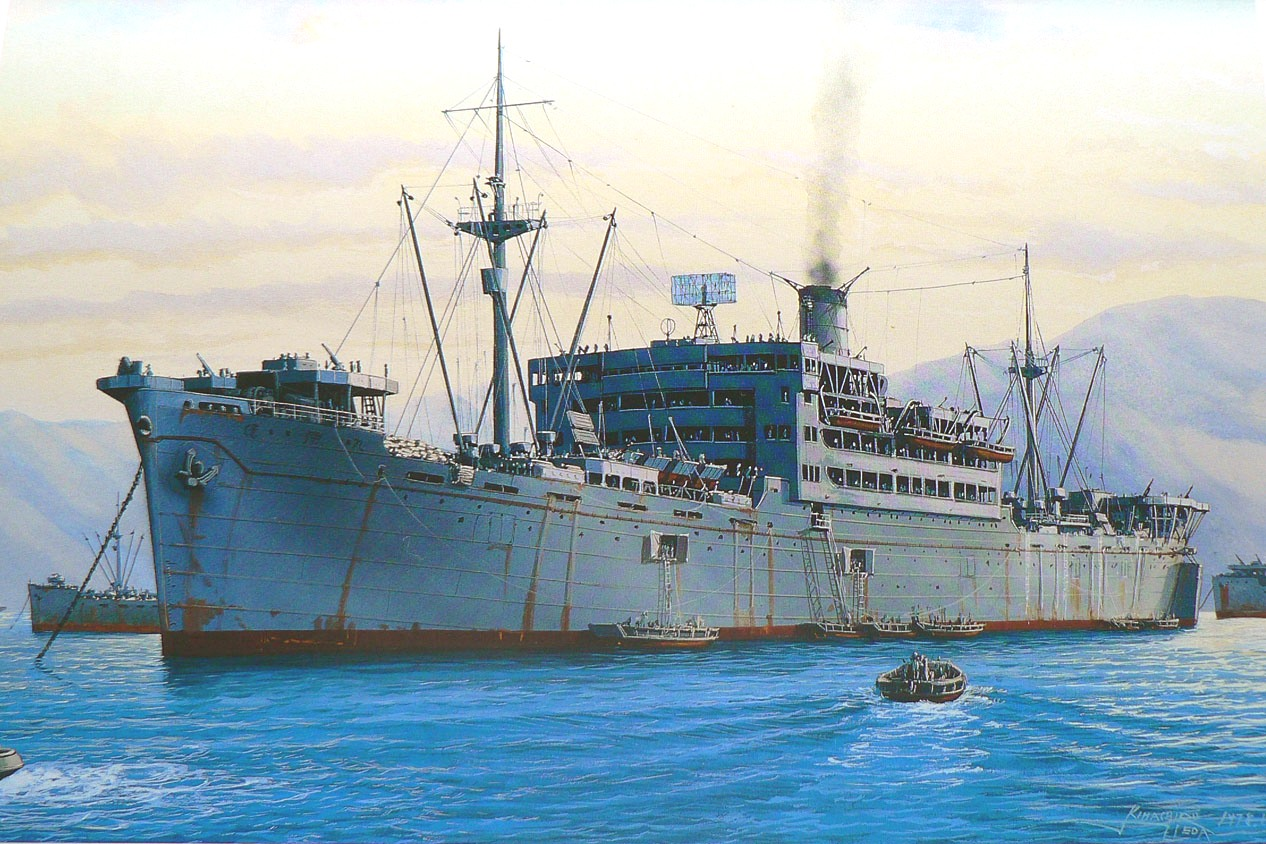
- Nigitsu Maru, by Ueda Kihachiro

History

Empire of Japan
- Name: Nigitsu Maru
- Builder: Harima, Harima
- Completed: March 1943
- Fate: Sunk 12 January 1944

General characteristics
- Class & type: Type A Special Purpose Ship
- Type: Landing craft depot ship
- Displacement: 11,800 tons (standard)
- Length: 471 ft 7 in (5,659 in) (pp)
- Beam: 64 ft (20 m)
- Draft: 25 ft 9 in (7.85 m) (maximum)
- Propulsion: 4 boilers, driving 2 geared turbines; 7,500 shp (5,600 kW)
- Speed: 20 knots (37 km/h)
- Armament: 2 × 1 Type 88 75 mm (3 in) AA guns; 10 × 1 Type 38 75 mm (3 in) field guns; 6 × 1 Type 25 mm (0.98 in) 96 AA guns

Nigitsu Maru (にぎつ丸) was a Japanese "Type A" landing craft carrier operated by the Imperial Japanese Army (IJA).

It was initially planned as a "Type C" landing craft carrier like Akitsu Maru, but was replanned as a "Type A", without any flight deck and looking like a passenger ship.

== Design features ==
Nigitsu Maru was a passenger liner of the same class as Akitsu Maru, taken over before completion and refitted by the Imperial Japanese Army into a "landing craft carrier" for landing operations. She was initially planned as a "Type C Special Purpose Ships" (丙型特殊船, Hei-gata Tokushu-sen) like her sister ship, where she would have been fitted with a flight deck in supplement to the landing facilities, but was later replanned as a "Type A". She received various facilities to handle Daihatsu-class landing craft, such as a well deck that could be flooded.

== Service history ==
On 9 January 1944 Nigitsu Maru left Palau for Ujina in convoy Fu-901 as the sole ship escorted by the destroyer Amagiri. She carried about 2,000 troops, mainly soldiers of the 12th Independent Engineer Regiment. Three days later off the Okino-Daito Island, southeast of Okinawa, Nigitsu Maru was attacked by the US submarine Hake which fired four torpedoes from the surface. Two hit Nigitsu Maru which sank in eight minutes at 23°15′N 132°51′E. 456 soldiers, 83 gunners and 35 crewmen were killed. Amagiri picked up the survivors and landed them in Japan.
