= Imperial Japanese Army shipping artillery =

Defensive artillery units aboard transport ships of the Imperial Japanese Army

The Imperial Japanese Army (IJA) established several shipping artillery units during the Pacific War. These units provided defensive guns and gun crews for the transport ships operated by the Army, as well as merchant vessels chartered by the service.

In December 1941 the IJA had a single shipping artillery unit, the Shipping Artillery Regiment. The regiment comprised two anti-aircraft battalions, a machine cannon battalion and a depot responsible for training replacement personnel.

By early 1944 the Shipping Artillery Regiment had been reorganised into two units, the 1st and 2nd Shipping Artillery Regiments. The 1st Shipping Artillery Regiment was based in Japan. The 2nd Shipping Artillery Regiment was initially based in Singapore, but moved to Manila in the Philippines in July 1944. Each regiment's table of organisation strength was 15 anti-aircraft batteries, three light anti-aircraft batteries, three surface gun batteries, two sea watch companies, a mortar company, a machine gun company, a depth charge company, a hydrophone company and an air watch company. A total of 2,300 soldiers were allocated to each unit. However, the actual strength and organisation of the regiments varied.

Small detachments from the regiments were allocated to individual ships to protect them against submarines and aircraft. As a result, the battalion, battery and company headquarters primarily performed administrative functions.

The IJA also established the 1st and 2nd Shipping Machine Gun Cannon Regiments to protect small ships. Each of these regiments comprised two light anti-aircraft battalions and a machine gun company. The Imperial Japanese Navy's Central Pacific Area Fleet also raised small air defence squads from April 1944 which were assigned to individual ships.

== See also ==
- Defensively equipped merchant ship
- Imperial Japanese Army Railways and Shipping Section
