= Kayaba Ka-1 =

Japanese autogyros

Ka-1 / Ka-2
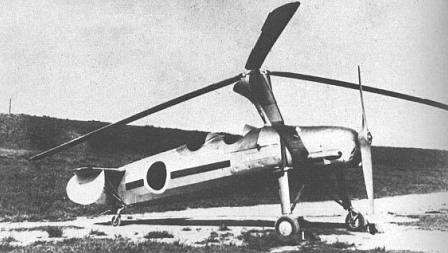
- Kayaba Ka-1

General information
- Type: Autogyro
- Manufacturer: Kayaba Industry
- Primary user: Imperial Japanese Army Air Service
- Number built: 240

History
- Manufactured: 1941-1945
- First flight: 26 May 1941
- Developed from: Kellett KD-1A

The Kayaba Ka-1 and Ka-2 were a series of autogyros produced by the Japanese manufacturer Kayaba Industry. Their official Army designation was the "Ka-Gō observation aircraft" (カ号観測機, Ka-gō-kansokuki) (Gō being translatable as "number"). It was the first series of armed autogyros to be used operationally.

The Ka-1 was developed in response to a Imperial Japanese Army (IJA) request following the crash of an imported American Kellett KD-1A; the design process, which took place between 1939 and 1941, has been claimed to have involved reverse engineered the KD-1A, which the KA-1 shared numerous similarities with. The prototype Ka-1 made its maiden flight on 26 May 1941 and flight testing garnered positive results, leading to the IJA ordering the type into production with the intention using the type to perform aerial reconnaissance and artillery spotting missions.

The Ka-1 and later Ka-2 both saw active service during World War II, although its original mission of performing artillery spotting for IJA forces fighting in mainland China was side-lined when military planners instead redirected the type towards ship-based operations to counter the rising Allied submarine threat and rising shipping losses. Deployed onboard the Army-operated assault ship Akitsu Maru as well as numerous bases on the Japanese home islands, the type proved to be a capable anti-submarine patrol aircraft, spotting and reporting numerous submarines, although the Ka-1 has never been credited with any kills.

== Design and development ==
The origins of the Ka-1 can be traced back to the Imperial Japanese Army (IJA) which, during the late 1930s, had become interested in the potential for using autogyros to spot for their artillery units. Accordingly, during 1939, a single Kellett KD-1A, an American-developed twin-seat autogyro, was imported to Japan for evaluation purposes; however, this aircraft was promptly damaged beyond repair during low speed flight trials. Thereafter, the Japanese manufacturer Kayaba Industry was instructed by the IJA to develop a similar machine and provided it with the wrecked KD-1A airframe to study. Kayaba's engineering team designed an autogyro with many similarities to the original KD-1A, albeit with several modifications to better suit Japanese manufacturing practices, designated Ka-1. The first prototype, which designated Ka-Gō and powered by a 240 hp (180 kW) Argus As 10c, was alleged to have been the repaired KD-1A, performed its maiden flight on 36 May 1941.

During flight trials of the prototype, largely favourable reports were produced. Specifically, it was determined that the Ka-1 have a take-off distance of only 30 m (98 ft) during still winds, while the aircraft could readily hover in place by holding the engine at full power while the nose was inclined by 15 degrees, as well as perform a full-turn while hovering steady. Another positive aspect was its low maintenance requirements, where were reportedly less than had been originally anticipated. Accordingly, the IJA quickly approved quantity production of the Ka-1 to support its artillery units.

Production of the Ka-1 was promptly joined by a second version, designated Ka-2, which was powered by Jacobs L-4MA-7 engines and bore closer similarities to the Kellett KD-1. However, the production effort was negatively impacted by a shortage of critical components for both rotors and engines, which in turn resulted in severe delivery delays. By the end of the conflict, 240 aircraft of the series had been produced at Kayaba's facility in Sendai. Of these, twelve aircraft had been reportedly destroyed before they could be delivered to the IJA while roughly thirty airframes never had engines installed. Accordingly, around fifty Ka-1s were delivered to the IJA, and of these, only thirty aircraft were ever actually deployed. Some sources have stated that 240 were built, but this cannot be verified.

At least one Ka-1 is known to have been used in experimental testing that involved the use of black powder rockets that were fitted to the rotor tips, the goal of this work was to explore if such an arrangement would increase the aircraft's load-carrying capacity.

== Operational history ==
Originally, Japanese military planners had intended to send the Ka-1 to spot for the artillery units based in mainland China, however, the changing fortunes of the Second World War rendered those plans meaningless. Instead, a few Ka-1s were sent to the Philippines to perform the duties of liaison aircraft as replacements for the Kokusai Ki-76.

In response to rising shipping losses, the IJA opted to use the autogyro for its response. Specifically, the service decided to allocate the majority of its Ka-1 and Ka-2 as carrier aircraft, their short take-off requirements making them well suited to flying from compact flight decks. To work around the restrictive payload capacity of the standard Ka-1, seaborne aircraft were typically operated as single-seaters while the weight saving from eliminating the second seat was reallocated towards the carriage of a pair of 60 kg depth charges, making them suitably equipped for performing anti-submarine patrol duties. The IJA's naval experimentation caught the attention of several officials within the Imperial Japanese Navy (IJN), such as Vice Admiral Jisaburō Ozawa, which led to an IJN evaluation of the type that made use of the original prototype. The IJN's technical board found that the Ka-1 and its higher payload capacity was more suited to their needs than the Ka-2. Ozawa advocated for the type's deployment, seeing its anti-submarine capabilities as filling a vacant niche for the protection of Japanese carriers when out of range of friendly land-based anti-submarine aircraft.

Operationally, the IJA's initial plan was to deploy the Ka-1/Ka-2 from 2D-class cargo ships to spot enemy submarines, but these ships turned out to be too cramped for such operations to be feasible. Therefore, the Ka-1/Ka-2 unit was assigned to the Army-operated assault ship Akitsu Maru from August 1944 until her sinking in November 1944. From 17 January 1945, ASW patrols were resumed from an airstrip on Iki Island with a maintenance base located at Gannosu Airfield in Fukuoka prefecture. ASW patrols also started from May 1945 from Izuhara airfield on Tsushima Island. These missions helped to protect one of the last operational Japanese sea lanes between the ports of Fukuoka and Pusan. Eventually, U.S. carrier-based aircraft began to appear even in the Tsushima Strait, thus, in June 1945, the Ka-1/Ka-2 units were relocated to Nanao base on the Noto Peninsula in the Sea of Japan, operating from there until the end of the conflict.

The Ka-1/Ka-2 did not directly sink any submarines during the war, however, the type was well-regarded for spotting numerous enemy submarines and reporting their positions.

== Variants ==
- Ka-Gō: Prototype built around a repaired Kellett autogyro.
- Ka-1: Imperial Japanese Army development of the Ka-Gō, powered by a 240 hp (180 kW) Argus As 10 engine.
- Ka-2: Imperial Japanese Army development of the Ka-1, powered by a 245 hp (183 kW) Jacobs L-4MA-7 engine.

== Specifications (Ka-1) ==
Data from Japanese Aircraft of the Pacific War

General characteristics

- Crew: 2
- Length: 9.2 m (30 ft 2 in)
- Empty weight: 775 kg (1,709 lb)
- Gross weight: 1,086 kg (2,394 lb)
- Max takeoff weight: 1,170 kg (2,579 lb)
- Powerplant: 1 × Argus As 10c inverted V-8 air-cooled piston engine, 180 kW (240 hp)
- Main rotor diameter: 12.2 m (40 ft 0 in)
- Main rotor area: 116.9 m^{2} (1,258 sq ft) three-bladed auto-rotating rotor
- Propellers: 2-bladed wooden fixed-pitch propeller

Performance

- Maximum speed: 165 km/h (103 mph, 89 kn)
- Cruise speed: 115 km/h (71 mph, 62 kn)
- Range: 280 km (170 mi, 150 nmi)
- Service ceiling: 3,500 m (11,500 ft)
- Rate of climb: 5 m/s (980 ft/min)
- Time to altitude: 1,000 m (3,300 ft) in three minutes and 20 seconds, 2,000 m (6,600 ft) in seven minutes and 30 seconds
- Disk loading: 10 kg/m^{2} (2.0 lb/sq ft)
- Power/mass: 0.152 kW/kg (0.093 hp/kg)

Armament
2x 60 kg (130 lb) depth-charges (taking the seat of the observator)
