= USS Queenfish (SS-393) =

Submarine of the United States

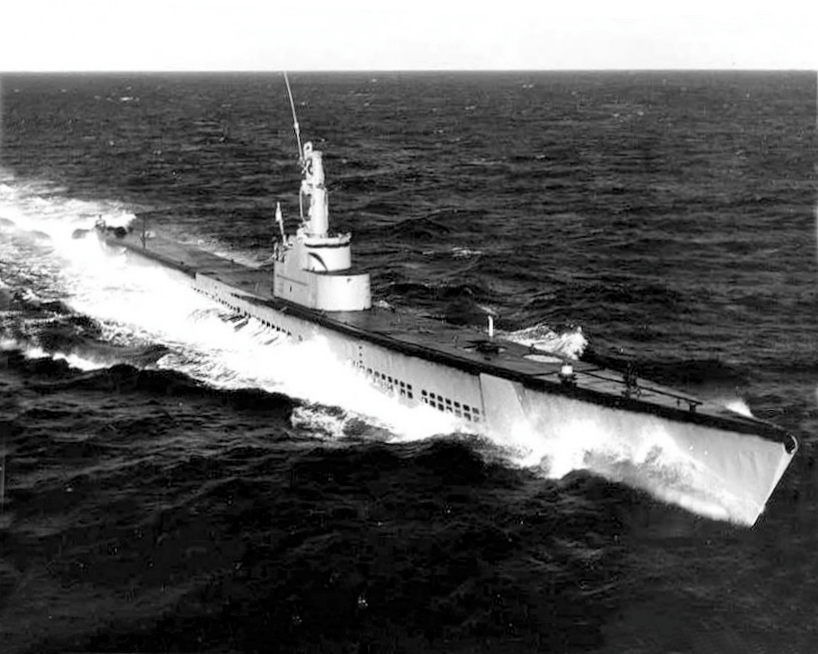
- Queenfish, post WW II. She became the model for boats that did not receive GUPPY or other special conversions.

History

United States
- Builder: Portsmouth Naval Shipyard, Kittery, Maine
- Laid down: 27 July 1943
- Launched: 30 November 1943
- Sponsored by: Mrs. Robert A. Theobald
- Commissioned: 11 March 1944
- Decommissioned: 1 March 1963
- Stricken: 1 March 1963
- Fate: Sunk as a target, 14 August 1963

General characteristics
- Class & type: Balao-class diesel-electric submarine
- Displacement: 1,526 long tons (1,550 t) surfaced; 2,391 long tons (2,429 t) submerged
- Length: 311 ft 6 in (94.95 m)
- Beam: 27 ft 3 in (8.31 m)
- Draft: 16 ft 10 in (5.13 m) maximum
- Propulsion: 4 × Fairbanks-Morse Model 38D8-⅛ 10-cylinder opposed piston diesel engines driving electrical generators; 2 × 126-cell Sargo batteries; 4 × high-speed Elliott electric motors with reduction gears; two propellers; 5,400 shp (4.0 MW) surfaced; 2,740 shp (2.0 MW) submerged
- Speed: 20.25 knots (37.50 km/h; 23.30 mph) surfaced; 8.75 knots (16.21 km/h; 10.07 mph) submerged
- Range: 11,000 nmi (20,000 km; 13,000 mi) surfaced at 10 knots (19 km/h; 12 mph)
- Endurance: 48 hours at 2 knots (3.7 km/h; 2.3 mph) submerged; 75 days on patrol
- Test depth: 400 ft (120 m)
- Complement: 10 officers, 70–71 enlisted
- Armament: 10 × 21-inch (533 mm) torpedo tubes; 6 forward, 4 aft; 24 torpedoes; 1 × 5-inch (127 mm) / 25 caliber deck gun; Bofors 40 mm and Oerlikon 20 mm cannon

USS Queenfish (SS/AGSS-393), was a Balao-class submarine, the first ship of the United States Navy to be named for the queenfish, a small food fish found off the Pacific coast of North America.

== Construction and commissioning ==
Queenfish was laid down by the Portsmouth Navy Yard at Kittery, Maine, on 27 July 1943; launched on 30 November 1943, sponsored by Mrs. Robert A. Theobald; and commissioned 11 March 1944, Lieutenant Commander Charles E. Loughlin in command.

== Service history ==
=== First patrol: August – October 1944 ===
After shakedown off the United States East Coast and further training in Hawaiian waters, Queenfish set out on her first patrol 4 August 1944, in Luzon Strait. She joined "Ed's Eradicators", a wolf pack which also included Barb and Tunny. The wolfpack was under the command of E. R. Swinburne, who rode aboard Eugene B. Fluckey's Barb.

Tunny had to withdraw after being damaged by air attack, but on 31 August, Queenfish made her first kill, the 4,700-ton tanker Chiyoda Maru. On 9 September she scored twice more, on 7,097-ton passenger-cargo ship Toyooka Maru and 3,054-ton transport Manshu Maru.

ComSubPac ordered the Eradicators to assist another wolf pack ("Ben's Busters" consisting of Growler, Sealion, and Pampanito), in rescuing Allied prisoners of war (POWs) who had been on transports (including Rakuyō Maru and Kachidoki Maru) in Japanese Convoy Hi-72. The Japanese had picked up their own survivors from the wreckage, but they made no attempt to save any survivors from among the 2,100 British and Australian POWs embarked in the transports. The submarines managed to get 127 out of the water. An approaching typhoon terminated the hunt and the patrol. Queenfish put into Majuro for refit on 3 October.

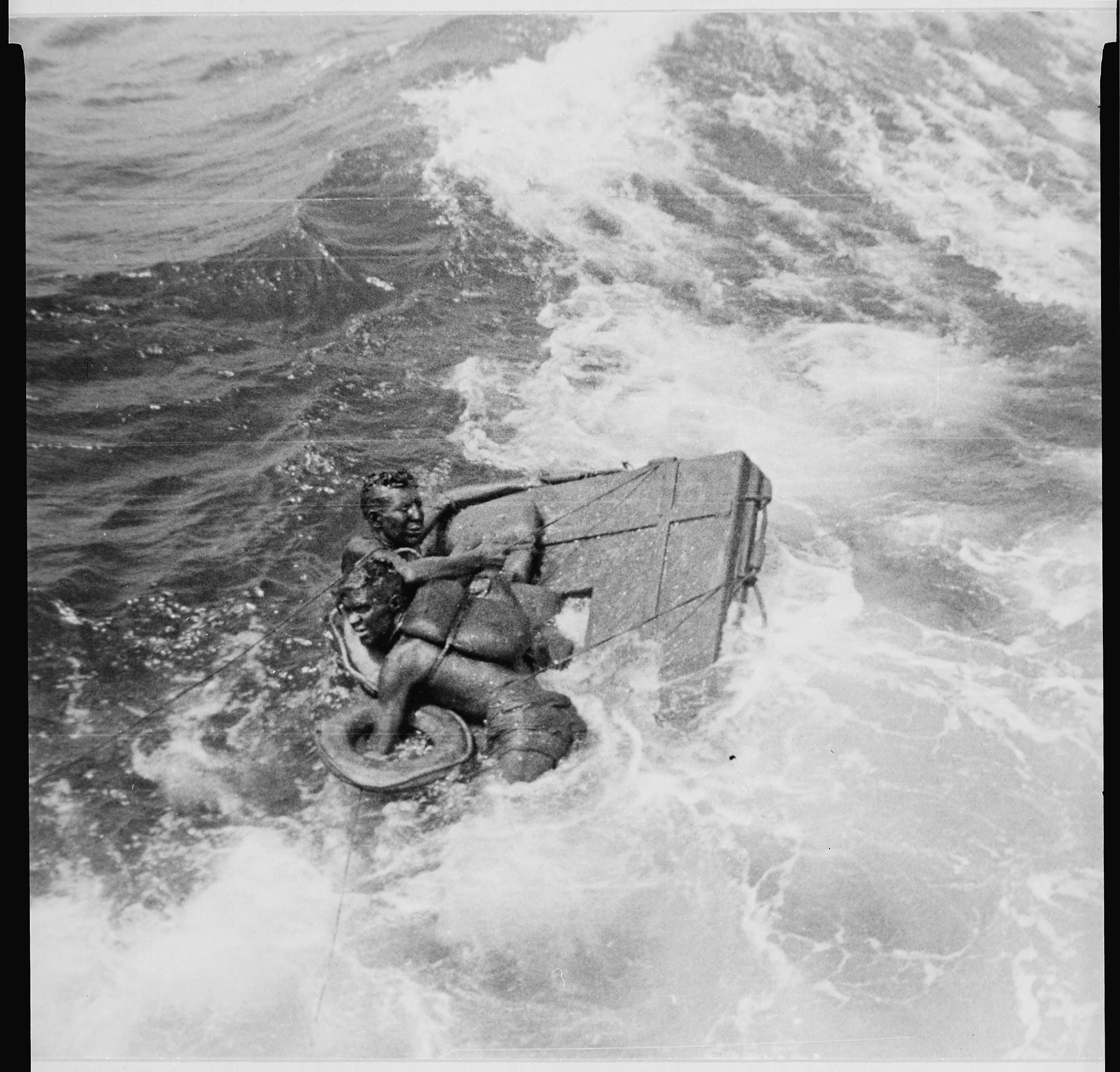
Queenfish rescuing British and Australian prisoners of war, survivors of the Japanese ship Rakuyo Maru

=== Second and third patrols: October 1944 – January 1945 ===
Queenfish's second war patrol was conducted in the northern part of the East China Sea. This time Loughlin had pack command as well as ship command. "Loughlin's Loopers" included Barb and Picuda. On 8 November Queenfish sank 1,051-ton Keijo Maru and the 1,948-ton Hakko Maru. On 9 November, she sent 2,131-ton Chojusan Maru, a former gunboat, to the bottom. Alerted by ComSubPac to the approach of a large convoy from Manchuria carrying reinforcements for the Philippines, the "Loopers" and another wolfpack, the "Urchins", combined to attack. Queenfish struck first on 15 November, sinking the 9,186-ton landing craft carrier Akitsu Maru. Over the next two days the subs destroyed eight ships of the convoy, including the 21,000-ton carrier Shin'yō and the largest of the troop transports. The attacks cost the Imperial Japanese Army defending the Philippines the bulk of a division.

Having received the Presidential Unit Citation for her first two patrols, Queenfish spent her third war patrol, 29 December to 29 January 1945, in the Formosa Straits and waters adjacent to the China coast without sinking any ships.

=== Fourth and fifth patrols: February – April 1945 ===
Queenfish returned to the same area for her fourth war patrol, 24 February to 14 April, as a member of another wolf pack. Cdr. William S. Post, Jr., the senior commanding officer in Spot, also had Sea Fox in his wolfpack, "Post's Panzers", the second of that name. After Spot expended all her torpedoes, she left to reload; pack command devolved on Loughlin.

On 1 April Queenfish sank 11,600-ton passenger-cargo ship Awa Maru, killing 2,003 people. The ship had been guaranteed safe passage by the United States government, since she was to carry Red Cross relief supplies to Japanese POW camps. The sinking occurred in fog, and Awa Maru was not sounding her fog horn, as required by international treaty. The incident caused considerable controversy. When the one survivor picked up by Queenfish, Kantaro Shimoda, told his story, Queenfish was ordered back to port; Loughlin was relieved of command, tried by court-martial and convicted of one of three charges, negligence in obeying orders and received a "Letter of Admonition" from the Secretary of the Navy. Loughlin survived the war, and though he never again commanded a vessel, he continued his career and eventually attained flag rank.

On 12 April Queenfish rescued the 13-man crew of a U.S. Navy PB4Y-2 aircraft of VPB-108 which ditched on 8 April after becoming lost. Queenfish spent her fifth patrol under Cdr. Frank N. Shamer on lifeguard duty in the East China Sea–Yellow Sea area. She was at Midway preparing for another patrol when the war ended.

=== Post-World War II operations, 1945 – 1963 ===
After an overhaul at Mare Island Naval Shipyard, Queenfish assumed duties as flagship, Submarine Force, Pacific Fleet. Homeported at Pearl Harbor after the war, Queenfish returned to the Far East during March 1946 and in June–July 1949, but spent most of the period to 1950 in training operations in the eastern Pacific. In late 1947 she operated in the Bering Sea.

In February and March 1950, Queenfish took part in combined Operations with units of the U.S. Pacific and British Fleets. She made cruises to Korean waters in 1951 and 1953. In February 1954 she sailed to her new homeport of San Diego. The next four years were spent operating off the west coast of the United States, with the exception of two weeks in Hawaii in late 1956. On 16 January 1958, she departed for a six-month deployment to WestPac, returning to San Diego 27 July to resume operations off the west coast of the United States.

Queenfish was reclassified AGSS-393 1 July 1960. She decommissioned and was struck from the Navy List 1 March 1963. Slated for scrapping, she was instead sunk as a target by the nuclear-powered submarine Swordfish on 14 August 1963.

Queenfish portrayed the USS Sea Tiger in the 1959 movie Operation Petticoat starring Cary Grant and Tony Curtis.

=== Raiding career ===
Date	Type	Name	Tonnage	Location
31 August 1944	Tanker	Chiyoda Maru	4,700 tons	21°21′N 121°06′E
9 September 1944	Passenger/Cargo	Toyooka Maru	7,097 tons	19°45′N 120°56′E
9 September 1944	Transport	Manshu Maru	3,054 tons	19°45′N 120°56′E
8 November 1944	Cargo	Keijo Maru	1,051 tons	31°9′N 129°38′E
8 November 1944	Cargo	Hakko Maru	1,948 tons	31°09′N 129°38′E
9 November 1944	Ex-Gunboat	Chojusan Maru	2,131 tons	31°17′N 129°10′E
15 November 1944	Landing craft carrier	Akitsu Maru	9,186 tons	33°15′N 128°10′E
1 April 1945	Passenger/Cargo/Relief	Awa Maru	11,600 tons	25°25′N 120°7′E
		Total	40,767 tons	

== Honors and awards ==
Queenfish was awarded the Presidential Unit Citation, and received six battle stars for World War II service.

- Presidential Unit Citation
