= Moku Daihatsu-class landing craft =

Class overview
- Name: Moku Daihatsu class landing craft
- Operators: Imperial Japanese Army
- Planned: 1140

General characteristics (Moku Daihatsu-class landing craft)
- Type: Landing Craft
- Tonnage: 8 tons
- Length: 49.2 ft (15.00 m)o/a
- Beam: 11.10 ft (3.38 m)
- Draught: 1.9 ft (0.58 m)
- Installed power: 60 hp
- Propulsion: Gasoline
- Speed: 8 knots (14.8 km/h)
- Range: 70 nautical miles (130 km) at 8 knots (14.8 km/h)
- Capacity: 80 men or 10 tons cargo
- Complement: 6
- Armament: 2 light machine guns

The Moku Daihatsu Class or 15m landing craft was a type of landing craft, used by the Imperial Japanese Army during World War II. It was similar to the Landing Craft, Vehicle, Personnel (LCVP), with a bow ramp that was lowered to disembark cargo upon riding up onto the beach. It was constructed of a plywood hull and powered by a gasoline engine.

The landing craft had problems with the plywood decomposing quickly in the tropics.
