= ST-class armored boat =

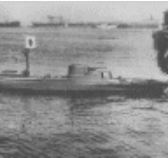

Class overview
- Name: ST-class armored boat
- Builders: Mitsubishi Heavy Industries, Yokohama
- Operators: Imperial Japanese Army
- Preceded by: Sōkōtei-class
- In service: 1940–1945

General characteristics
- Type: Armored boat
- Length: 11 m (36.09 ft) o/a
- Beam: 2.0 m (6.56 ft)
- Draught: 1.1 m (3.61 ft)
- Installed power: 150 hp
- Propulsion: Diesel engine
- Speed: 9.65 knots (17.9 km/h)
- Armament: 1 x 37 mm tank gun

The ST-class was a type of armored boat of the Imperial Japanese Army that saw service during World War II. She was developed in 1940 (Showa 15) mainly for riverine patrol in China, a role that was previously served by the Soukoutei-class armored boat. The prototype was 11 meters long with a beam of 2.00 meters and a draught of 1.10 meters. Her speed was 9.65 knots. All ships were built at the Yokohama shipyard of Mitsubishi Heavy Industries She was armed with a 37 mm gun (jp:狙撃砲).
