= Type 98 20 mm AA machine cannon =

Type 98 20 mm anti-aircraft machine cannon
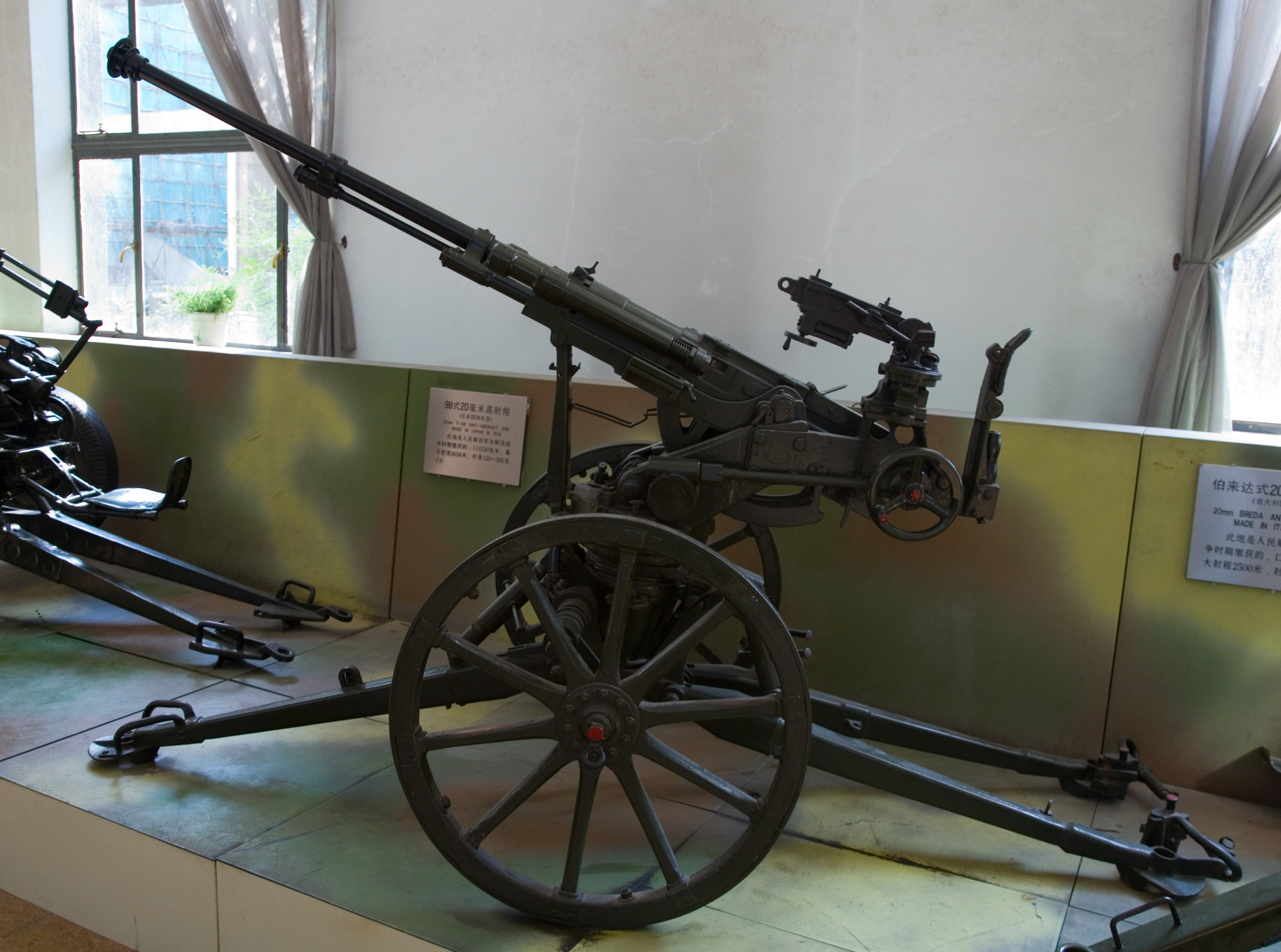
- A Type 98 20 mm cannon at the China People's Revolution Military Museum. Note the gun has no magazine fitted.
- Type: Autocannon
- Place of origin: Empire of Japan

Service history
- In service: 1938–1945
- Used by: Japan, Indonesia
- Wars: World War II; Indonesian National Revolution; First Indochina War

Production history
- Designed: 1933-1938
- No. built: 2,500 of Type 98 and approximately 500 of Type 4 (an alternate source states 3,241 Type 98 and 548 Type 4 units produced)

Specifications
- Mass: 373 kg (822 lb)
- Barrel length: 1.4 m (4 ft 7 in) L/70
- Shell: 20×142 mm
- Shell weight: .14 kg (4.9 oz)
- Caliber: 20 mm (0.79 in)
- Action: Gas operated
- Carriage: Two wheeled split trail.
- Elevation: -5° to +85°
- Traverse: 360°
- Rate of fire: 300 rpm (cyclic); 120 rpm (practical)
- Muzzle velocity: 830 m/s (2,700 ft/s)
- Maximum firing range: 5.5 km (3.4 mi) (horizontal); 3.5 km (11,000 ft) (ceiling)
- Feed system: 20 round box

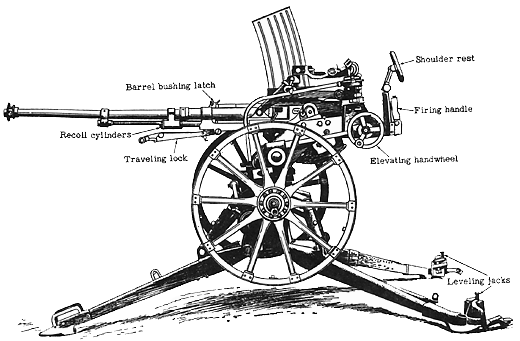
A drawing of a Type 98 20 mm gun from a US Army field manual

The Type 98 20 mm AA machine cannon was the most common light anti-aircraft gun of the Imperial Japanese Army. It entered service in 1938 and was used until the end of World War II. After World War II this gun was used by the Indonesian Army in the Indonesian National Revolution and North Vietnam in the First Indochina War.

== Design and use ==
The Type 98 20 mm AA machine cannon was the most common light anti-aircraft gun of the Japanese military. The Type 98 designation was given to this gun as it was accepted in the year 2598 of the Japanese calendar (1938). It entered service that same year and first saw combat in Nomonhan. It was used until the end of World War II. About 80% of the Imperial Japanese Army light AA guns were Type 98s. The gun could be emplaced in about three minutes by an experienced crew or fired inaccurately from its wheels. It was also used as an anti-tank weapon, it was considered to be robust, light, and easily portable.

This weapon and its variants were based on the French design of the 13.2 mm Hotchkiss machine gun of the 1930s, which the Japanese forces had bought and further developed at home. The Type 98 was also one of the two armament options for the IJA's Submersible gun mount Model 1.

== Ammunition ==
- Type 100 armour piercing tracer. Weight 162 g projectile and 431 g complete round.
- Type 100 high-explosive tracer (with self-destruct). Weight 136 g projectile and 405 g complete round with 890 m/s.

== Variant ==
Two of the guns mounted together formed a variant known as the Type 4 20 mm twin AA machine cannon. Approximately 500 to 548 of these guns were produced.

== See also ==
- 20 mm AA machine cannon carrier truck
- Type 98 20 mm AA half-track vehicle
- Type 98 Ta-Se
- Type 97 automatic cannon

== Bibliography ==
- US Army field manual at hyperwar.org
- Intelligence briefing at lonesentry.com
- Ness, Leland (2014). Guide to Japanese Ground Forces 1937–1945: Volume 2: Weapons of the Imperial Japanese Army & Navy Ground Forces. Helion & Company. ISBN 978-19099-8275-8.
- McLean, Donald B. Japanese Artillery Weapons and Tactics, ISBN 0-87947-157-3
- Ogata Katsuichi technological general manager of army "Matter of 13mm "Hotchkiss-type" anti-aircraft gun semi-adopted types enactment" 1934 Japan Center for Asian Historical Record Ref.C01001317200
- Army technological headquarters "Examination report of type 98 anti-aircraft gun and dummy cartridge" 1940 Japan Center for Asian Historical Record Ref.A03032139400
- War Department TM-E-30-480 Handbook on Japanese Military Forces. September 1944.
