= Kokusai Ki-76 =

Japanese liaison/observation aircraft

Ki-76
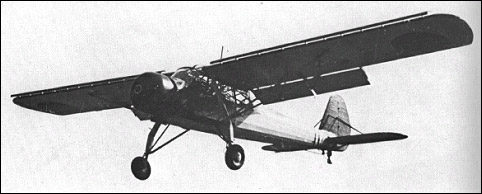

General information
- Type: Liaison/observation
- Manufacturer: Kokusai
- Primary user: Imperial Japanese Army Air Service
- Number built: 937 including a single prototype

History
- Introduction date: 1942
- First flight: May 1941
- Retired: 1945

The Kokusai Ki-76, or Liaison Aircraft Type 3 (in Japanese: 三式指揮連絡機), was a high-wing monoplane designed and produced by the Japanese aircraft manufacturer Kokusai. The Allied reporting name was Stella.

Design works on the Ki-76 commenced in 1940 in response to an Imperial Japanese Army Air Service (IJAAF) request; while often contrasted against the German Fieseler Fi 156, it was not a reverse engineered copy of this aircraft and several distinct differences are present between the two. The Ki 76 performed its maiden flight in May 1941, and entered quantity production during November 1942. Operated by the IJAAF, the type flew active combat missions during World War II, typically being used to conduct artillery spotting and liaison missions up until the conflict's end. Several aircraft were modified for shipborne operations and flew from the escort carrier Akitsu Maru in an armed anti-submarine aircraft configuration, however, the Ki-76 was not particularly effective in this capacity.

== Design and development ==
The Kokusai Ki-76 had its origins in an order issued in 1940 by the Imperial Japanese Army Air Force (IJAAF) that directed the aircraft company Kokusai to develop a suitable artillery spotting and liaison aircraft. This instruction had been influenced by the wartime experiences of Nazi Germany and its success with the Fieseler Fi 156 "Storch", to which the Ki-76 would have a strong resemblance to in both appearance and concept. Specifically, both aircraft were high-winged monoplanes with fixed tailwheel undercarriage. Despite these commonalities between the two, it is improbable that the Ki-76 was a direct copy of the Fi 156 as Japan did not have direct access to any examples until 1941, which effectively prevented any potential reverse engineering effort. The Japanese design effort was headed by Kozo Masuhara. Unlike the Fi 156's slotted flap arrangement, the Ki-76 was furnished with Fowler flaps that were synchronised with the variable-incidence surfaces of the horizontal tail to generate a greater lift coefficient. It was powered by a single Hitachi Ha-42 radial engine, as opposed to the Argus As 10 inline engine that powered the Fi 156.

The type performed its maiden flight in May 1941, and promptly underwent flight trials. While it demonstrated some instability during flight, the Ki-76 was generally considered to be an easy aircraft to handle and suitable to be flown by less experienced pilots. During a series of competitive evaluation flights against an imported Fi 156, the Ki-76 proved to be superior in various performance criteria with the notable exception of landing distance, reportedly requiring more than the Fi 156. During November 1941, flight trials of the Ki-76 were declared to be complete, and quantity production of the type as the Army Type 3 Command Liaison Plane proceeded at the Hiratsuka plant.

== Operational history ==
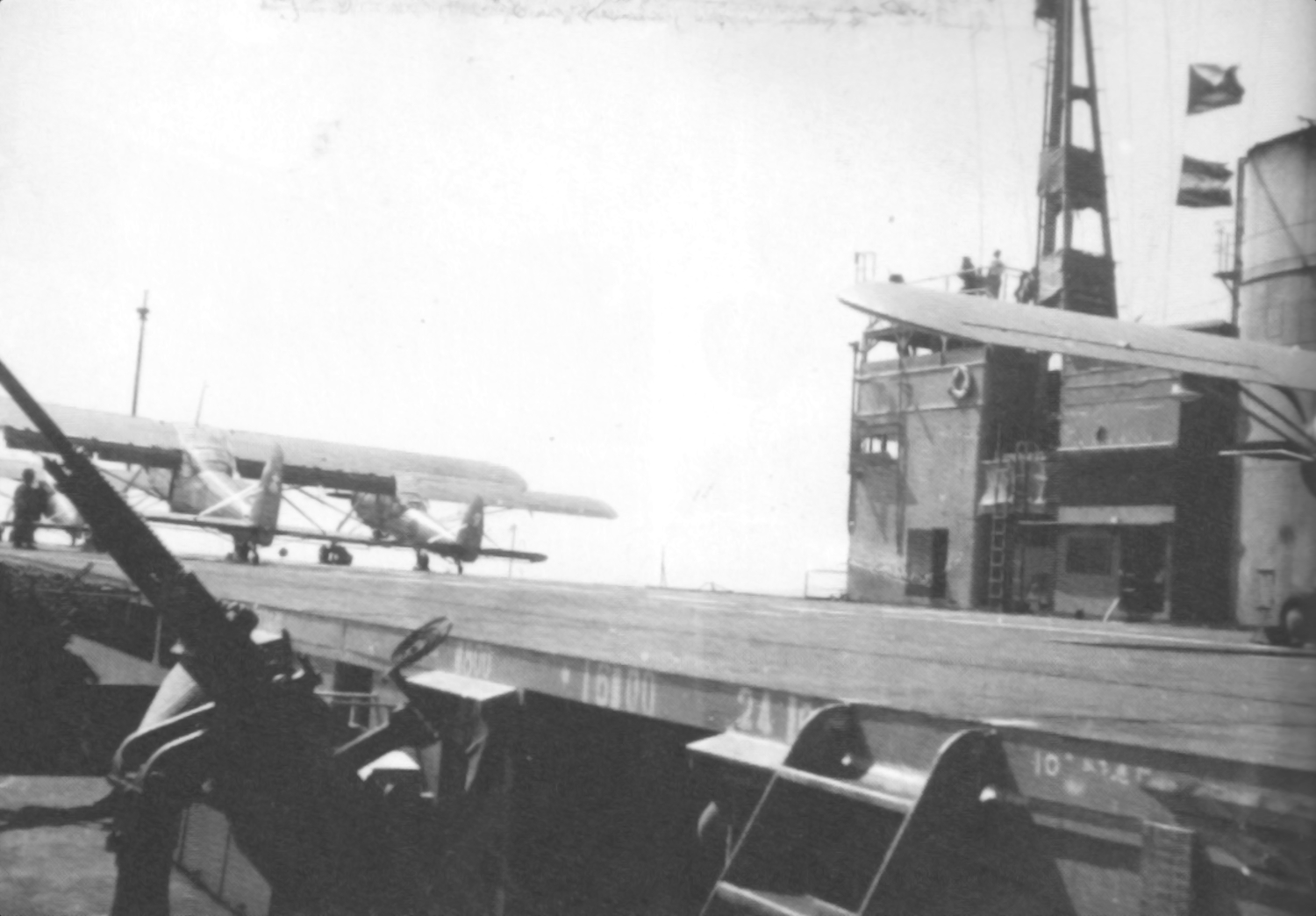
Several Ki-76s on the flight deck of the Akitsu Maru, 1944

The Ki-76 was typically deployed as an artillery spotter and liaison aircraft, and continued to be used in this capacity until the end of the conflict.

During late 1943, several Ki-76s were modified for use as shipboard anti-submarine aircraft and were operated from the Japanese Army's escort carrier, the Akitsu Maru. To adapt the aircraft to this environment and mission role, each airframe was outfitted with an arrestor hook along with the hardpoints for the carriage of a pair of 60 kg (132 lb) depth charges. Despite being deployed in this capacity, the Ki-76 was not regarded as a particularly effective anti-submarine platform.

== Operators ==
Japan

- Imperial Japanese Army Air Service

Thailand

- Royal Thai Air Force

== Specifications (Ki-76) ==
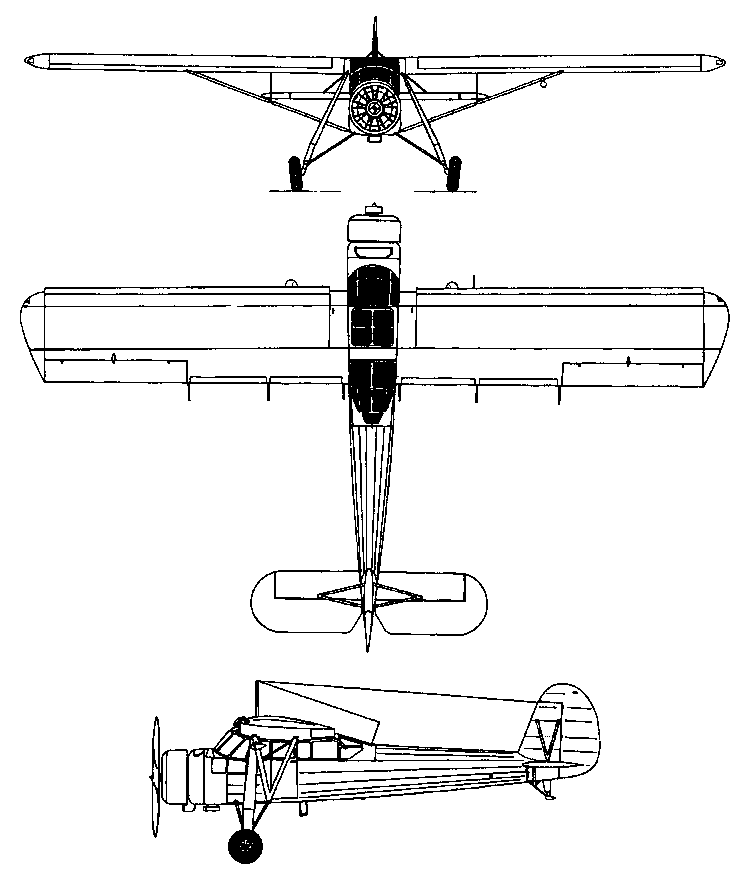
Ki-76 Stella three-view

Data from Encyclopedia of Military Aircraft, Japanese Aircraft of the Pacific War

General characteristics

- Crew: 2
- Length: 9.65 m (31 ft 8 in)
- Wingspan: 15 m (49 ft 3 in)
- Height: 2.9 m (9 ft 6 in)
- Wing area: 29.4 m^{2} (316 sq ft)
- Empty weight: 1,110 kg (2,447 lb)
- Gross weight: 1,530 kg (3,373 lb)
- Max takeoff weight: 1,623 kg (3,578 lb)
- Powerplant: 1 × Hitachi Ha42 nine-cylinder air-cooled radial piston engine, 231 kW (310 hp)
- Propellers: 2-bladed fixed-pitch propeller

Performance

- Maximum speed: 178 km/h (111 mph, 96 kn) at sea level
- Range: 750 km (470 mi, 400 nmi)
- Service ceiling: 5,630 m (18,470 ft)

Armament

- Guns: 1× 7.7 mm (0.303 in) machine gun in rear cockpit
- Bombs: 2× 60 kg (132 lb) depth charges (some variants)

== See also ==
Aircraft of comparable role, configuration, and era

- Fieseler Fi 156 Storch
- IMAM Ro.63
- Kobeseiko Te-Gō
- Repülőgépgyár Levente II
- Westland Lysander
- Taylorcraft Auster

Related lists

- List of aircraft of World War II
- List of military aircraft of Japan
