= Toku Daihatsu-class landing craft =

Class of Japanese landing craft

Class overview
- Name: Toku Daihatsu Class, Landing Craft
- Operators: during World War II: Imperial Japanese Navy
- Preceded by: Daihatsu

General characteristics (Toku Daihatsu-class landing craft)
- Class & type: Toku Daihatsu
- Type: Landing Craft
- Tonnage: 35 tons
- Length: 17.65 m (57.91 ft) o/a
- Beam: 3.72 m (12.20 ft)
- Draught: 1.01 m (3.31 ft)
- Installed power: 150 horsepower
- Speed: 11 knots (20.4 km/h)
- Range: 100 nautical miles (185 km) at 7.5 knots (13.9 km/h); 50 nautical miles (93 km) at 8.5 knots (15.7 km/h)
- Capacity: 1 Type 97 tank (15.6 ton) or 100 men
- Complement: 15
- Armament: 1 heavy machine gun or 2 light machine guns or 3 25mm/60 AA guns

The "Toku Daihatsu-class landing craft" (特大型発動機艇, Toku Daihatsu-gata hatsudō-ki-tei) or 17 m landing craft was a type of landing craft, used by the Imperial Japanese Navy during World War II. It was designated the "Super Type A" landing craft by the United States.

== History ==
It was a larger design of the Daihatsu Class landing craft, with a bow ramp that was lowered to disembark cargo upon riding up onto the beach. It was constructed of a metal hull and powered by a diesel engine.

Designed to carry a medium-sized tank or two eight ton tanks. The landing craft was used extensively to run troops and supplies to isolated garrisons, referred to as ant runs by the Japanese. The Allied air forces and U.S. PT boats undertook increasingly successful raids at intercepting and destroying these craft towards the end of World War II.

== Bibliography ==
- Jentschura, Hansgeorg; Jung, Dieter; and Mickel, Peter. Translated by Brown, J.D. 1977. Warships of the Imperial Japanese Navy, 1869-1945. Naval Institute Press. ISBN 0-87021-893-X.
- Military Monograph Series - Japanese Landing Craft of World War II. Merriam Press. ISBN 1-57638-049-1
