= List of shipwrecks in November 1944 =

The list of shipwrecks in November 1944 includes ships sunk, foundered, grounded, or otherwise lost during November 1944.

== 1 November ==
List of shipwrecks: 1 November 1944
Ship	State	Description
USS Abner Read	United States Navy	World War II: The Fletcher-class destroyer was sunk in Leyte Gulf by a Japanese kamikaze attack by an Aichi D3A aircraft with the loss of 22 of her 336 crew.
Asama Maru	Imperial Japanese Navy	World War II: Convoy MAMO-04: The Asama Maru-class troopship was torpedoed and sunk in the Bashi Channel (20°17′N 117°08′E) by USS Atule (United States Navy). A total of 355 troops, 21 gunners and 98 crewmen were killed; 1,028 troops, 245 gunners and 103 crewmen were rescued by Sagi, W-17, and W-18 (all Imperial Japanese Navy).
Biwa Maru	Japan	The cargo ship sank in the South China Sea (3°54′S 109°13′E).
Caroline Maru	Imperial Japanese Navy	World War II: The auxiliary vessel was torpedoed and sunk in the South China Sea (12°57′N 120°12′E) by USS Blackfin (United States Navy). 13 crew were killed.
USS Concrete No. 9	United States Navy	The 366-foot (112 m) B7-A1-class concrete-hulled oil barge was wrecked at Eniwetok (11°41′N 162°35′E).
Horai Maru No.7	Japan	World War II: The coastal tanker was torpedoed and sunk in the South China Sea off Mindoro, Philippines 12°57′N 120°12′E) by USS Ray (United States Navy). Ten crew were killed.
HMS LCF 37	Royal Navy	World War II: Operation Infatuate: The landing craft flak (415 GRT) was sunk by German coastal artillery off Walcheren, Zeeland, Netherlands. 42 crew were killed and 7 of the 36 survivors were wounded.
HMS LCF 38	Royal Navy	World War II: Operation Infatuate: The landing craft flak (415 GRT) was sunk by German coastal artillery off Walcheren, Zeeland, Netherlands. Four crew were killed and another died of his wounds.
HMS LCG(L) 1	Royal Navy	World War II: Operation Infatuate: The landing craft gun (491 GRT) was sunk by German coastal artillery off Walcheren, Zeeland, Netherlands. Two crew were killed and 20 were wounded.
HMS LCG(L) 2	Royal Navy	World War II: Operation Infatuate: The landing craft gun (491 GRT) was heavily damaged by German coastal artillery off Walcheren, Zeeland, Netherlands and was sunk by two mines while being towed off the danger zone. Six crew were killed.
HMS LCG(M) 101	Royal Navy	World War II: Operation Infatuate: The LCG(M) 1-class medium support landing craft (270 GRT) was heavily damaged by German coastal artillery off Walcheren, Zeeland, Netherlands. She managed to retire and reached deep water, but steadily settled and finally sank. Two crew were killed.
HMS LCG(M) 102	Royal Navy	World War II: Operation Infatuate: The LCG(M) 1-class medium support landing craft was heavily damaged by German coastal artillery off Walcheren, Zeeland, Netherlands, drifted ashore and burnt out. 32 crew were killed.
HMS LCI(S) 532	Royal Navy	World War II: Operation Infatuate: The landing craft infantry (small) (63 GRT) was hit by two shells while discharging troops on the beach at Walcheren, Zeeland, Netherlands. She withdraws but was set on fire by the explosion of a damaged petrol tank about a mile offshore. She was abandonned and sank. The whole crew survived.
HMS LCS(L) 252	Royal Navy	World War II: Operation Infatuate: The landing craft support (large)s (112 GRT) was sunk by German coastal artillery off Walcheren, Zeeland, Netherlands. Thirty men were lost.
HMS LCS(L) 256	Royal Navy	World War II: Operation Infatuate: The landing craft support (large)s (112 GRT) was sunk by German coastal artillery off Walcheren, Zeeland, Netherlands. Eleven men were lost.
HMS LCS(L) 258	Royal Navy	World War II: Operation Infatuate: The landing craft support (large)s (112 GRT) was sunk by German coastal artillery off Walcheren, Zeeland, Netherlands. 24 men were lost.
HMS LCT 789	Royal Navy	World War II: Operation Infatuate: The LCT-4-class landing craft tank (200 GRT) was sunk by two mines off Walcheren, Zeeland, Netherlands. The whole crew survived.
HMS LCT 839	Royal Navy	World War II: Operation Infatuate: The LCT-4-class landing craft tank (200 GRT) was heavily damaged by German coastal artillery while clearing the beach at Walcheren, Zeeland, Netherlands, and finally sank 2 miles offshore. The whole crew survived.
HMS LCT 1133	Royal Navy	World War II: Operation Infatuate: The LCT-4-class landing craft tank (200 GRT) was heavily damaged by German coastal artillery off Walcheren, Zeeland, Netherlands and was later sunk by a mine. Two crew died.
HMS LCT 7011	Royal Navy	World War II: Operation Infatuate: The LCT-3-class landing craft tank (625 GRT) was sunk by a mine while approaching the beach at Walcheren, Zeeland, Netherlands. There were no casualties.
Midsland	Germany	World War II: The cargo ship was bombed and sunk at Calais, France, by Allied aircraft. She was refloated in November 1945 and scrapped at Hendrik-Ido-Ambacht, South Holland, Netherlands, in April 1946.
Stortind	Norway	The coaster's (169 GRT, 1896) cargo caught fire and she burned and sank in Billefjord, Norway. Two crew died.
TA20	Kriegsmarine	World War II: Action of 1 November 1944: The torpedo boat, a former Audace-class destroyer, was sunk in the Adriatic Sea south of Lošinj, Yugoslavia (44°36′N 14°32′E) by HMS Avon Vale and HMS Wheatland (both Royal Navy).
UJ 202	Kriegsmarine	World War II: Action of 1 November 1944: The submarine chaser, a former Gabbiano-class corvette, was sunk in the Adriatic Sea west of Pag Island, Yugoslavia (44°34′N 14°44′E) by HMS Avon Vale and HMS Wheatland (both Royal Navy).
UJ 208	Kriegsmarine	World War II: Action of 1 November 1944: The submarine chaser, a former Gabbiano-class corvette, was sunk in the Adriatic Sea west of Pag Island (44°34′N 14°44′E) by HMS Avon Vale and HMS Wheatland (both Royal Navy).
Unkai Maru No.12	Japan	World War II: The transport ship was torpedoed and sunk in the South China Sea 12°57′N 120°12′E) by USS Blackfin (United States Navy). 12 crew were killed.
V 5525	Kriegsmarine	World War II: The KFK 2-class naval drifter/Vorpostenboot was torpedoed and sunk in Sognefjord, Norway by HNoMS MTB-709 and HNoMS MTB-712 (both Royal Norwegian Navy).
V 5531	Kriegsmarine	World War II: The KFK 2-class naval drifter/Vorpostenboot was torpedoed and sunk in Sognefjord, Norway by HNoMS MTB-709 and HNoMS MTB-712 (both Royal Norwegian Navy) with the loss of four lives.
Vs 927 Ibis	Kriegsmarine	The naval drifter/Vorpostenboot was lost on this date.
Vs 928 Alk	Kriegsmarine	The naval drifter/Vorpostenboot was lost on this date.
HMS Whitaker	Royal Navy	World War II: Convoy SC-159: The Captain-class frigate (1,300 GRT) was torpedoed and damaged in the Atlantic Ocean off Malin Head, County Donegal, Ireland (55°30′N 7°39′W) by U-483 (Kriegsmarine) with the loss of 92 crew. The ship was destroyed forward of the bridge due to the explosion of the forward magazine. She was towed to Londonderry and later to Belfast, but was declared a constructive total loss.

== 2 November ==
List of shipwrecks: 2 November 1944
Ship	State	Description
Atlas Maru	Imperial Japanese Navy	World War II: Convoy MOMA-06: The Alaska Maru-class auxiliary troop transport was torpedoed and damaged in the Bashii Strait off Sabtang Island, Philippines (20°33′N 121°32′E), by USS Pomfret (United States Navy) and was beached. Two crewmen and 79 members of the 13th Shin'yō Squadron were killed. On 4 November she was towed to another beach where her cargo was unloaded and salvage began. Salvage efforts ended when a typhoon hit on 18 November. An unknown number of the 50 Shin'yō-class suicide motorboats being carried as deck cargo were lost.
Châteauroux	Free France	The cargo ship ran aground in the River Mersey and was severely damaged. She was consequently scrapped.
HMS Colsay	Royal Navy	World War II: The Isles-class naval trawler (545 GRT) was torpedoed and sunk in the North Sea while being anchored at the western end of Ostend outer anchorage, West Flanders, Belgium (51°14′N 02°47′E). 36 crew were killed and there was only one survivor. It was thought she was sunk by a Kriegsmarine midget submarine but she was actually sunk by a torpedo fired by S167 or S 207 (all Kriegsmarine).
Fort Lee	United States	World War II: The Type T2-SE-A2 tanker was torpedoed and sunk in the Indian Ocean (27°35′S 83°11′E) by U-181 (Kriegsmarine) with the loss of 25 of her 75 crew. Sixteen survivors were rescued by Ernebank (United Kingdom) on 7 November; seventeen by Tumacacori (United States) on 9 November; and seventeen by Mary Ball (United States) on 16 November.
Hachijin Maru	Japan	World War II: Convoy SIMA-04: The cargo ship was torpedoed and sunk in the South China Sea 225 nautical miles (417 km) east of Singapore (00°45′N 107°44′E) by HMS Tantalus (Royal Navy). Six crewmen were killed.
Kumano Maru	Imperial Japanese Navy	World War II: the auxiliary netlayer was torpedoed and sunk in the Strait of Malacca by HMS Terrapin (Royal Navy).
Kuramasan Maru	Imperial Japanese Army	World War II: The Koyasan Maru-class auxiliary transport was torpedoed and sunk in the Makassar Strait, Netherlands East Indies (04°25′S 118°24′E) by USS Barbero (United States Navy). 16 passengers and 5 crewmen were killed.
NO 45	Kriegsmarine	The KFK 2-class naval drifter was lost on this date. Raised post war, repaired for GMSA, later to US for reparations.
HMS Northcoates	Royal Navy	The naval trawler (277 GRT, 1919) sank in the English Channel off Littlehampton, Sussex while under tow (50°39′N 00°35′W).
Noto Maru	Imperial Japanese Army	World War II: The Nagara Maru-class auxiliary transport was sunk off Luzon, Philippines by a near miss from Consolidated B-24 Liberator aircraft. Three crewmen, one gunner, one shipyard worker, 30 troops and 50 other passengers were killed.
Rio Bravo	United Kingdom	World War II: The T1 tanker (1,124 GRT) was sunk in the North Sea while at anchor off Ostend by S 167, S 175 and S 207 (all Kriegsmarine). 14 crew were killed.

== 3 November ==
List of shipwrecks: 3 November 1944
Ship	State	Description
AF 92	Kriegsmarine	The Artilleriefährprahm, a converted Type DM minelayer Marinefährprahm, was sunk on this date.
Akikaze	Imperial Japanese Navy	World War II: The Minekaze-class destroyer was torpedoed and sunk west of Cape Balingo, Philippines by USS Pintado (United States Navy) with the loss of all hands when she intercepted torpedoes fired at the aircraft carrier Jun'yō (Imperial Japanese Navy).
Blue Bell	United Kingdom	The 38.8-foot (11.8 m), 16.68-ton sail fishing smack was wrecked in an unknown location, a total loss.
Daimei Maru	Japan	World War II: The cargo ship was torpedoed and sunk in the Pacific Ocean off Borneo (5°53′N 111°12′E) by USS Gurnard (United States Navy). 31 passengers and three crewmen were killed.
Hamburg Maru	Imperial Japanese Army	World War II: Convoy MOMA-06: The Eastern Glade-class transport was torpedoed and damaged by USS Pomfret (United States Navy) in the Bashii Strait off Sabtang Island, Philippines (20°20′N 121°30′E). She was then scuttled by the escorts. Three troops, a gunner, and eighteen crewmen were killed. Survivors were rescued by Toyo Maru No. 3 and W-17 (both Imperial Japanese Navy).
Hornøy	Norway	The passenger ship (178 GRT, 1937) ran aground at Austerbøen, Norway. She later floated off and sank.
HMS LCT 976	Royal Navy	The LCT-4-class landing craft tank (200 GRT) broke her back in heavy seas, was abandoned and sank near the mouth of the Scheldt. There were no casualties.
T-112	Imperial Japanese Navy	The No. 103-class landing ship ran aground off Cape Bojeador, Luzon (12°40′N 121°22′E). She was abandoned on 5 November, with her crew and cargo taken off by T-151 (Imperial Japanese Navy).

== 4 November ==
List of shipwrecks: 4 November 1944
Ship	State	Description
Hermann Fritzen	Germany	World War II: The cargo ship was sunk in an Allied air raid on Hamburg. She was subsequently refloated and returned to service.
Kagu Maru	Imperial Japanese Navy	World War II: Convoy TAMA-31A: The Kinugasa Maru-class auxiliary transport was torpedoed and damaged in the South China Sea by USS Bream, and USS Guitarro (both United States Navy). She was then torpedoed and sunk by USS Ray (United States Navy) 10.5 nautical miles (19.4 km) north-west of Cape Bolinao, Lingayen Gulf (15°54′N 119°45′E). Twenty-two passengers and 24 crewmen were killed. A lifeboat from T-160 (Imperial Japanese Navy) picked up survivors and took them to Santa Cruz.
Signal	Germany	World War II: The cargo ship was sunk in an Allied air raid on Hamburg. She was refloated but declared a constructive total loss.
Sperrbrecher 30	Kriegsmarine	World War II: The Sperrbrecher was sunk in an Allied air raid on Hamburg.
HMS Supporter	Royal Navy	The dritfer (88 GRT) ran aground off Newhaven and subsequently founded. The whole crew was rescued by the Newhaven lifeboat.
TA49	Kriegsmarine	World War II: The Spica-class torpedo boat was bombed and sunk at La Spezia, Italy by Allied aircraft.
Veendam	Germany	World War II: The accommodation ship was severely damaged by fire in an Allied air raid on Hamburg by the United States Eighth Air Force. She was further damaged in April 1945. She was repaired in 1945–47, and returned to Dutch service on 30 January 1947.
W-5	Imperial Japanese Navy	World War II: The W-5-class minesweeper was torpedoed and sunk in the Malacca Strait (03°44′N 99°50′E) by HMS Terrapin (Royal Navy)

== 5 November ==
List of shipwrecks: 5 November 1944
Ship	State	Description
AF 44	Kriegsmarine	World War II: The Type C Artilleriefährprahm was scuttled at Zijpe, North Holland.
AF 47	Kriegsmarine	World War II: The Artilleriefährprahm, a converted Type B Marinefährprahm, was scuttled at Zijpe, North Holland.
AF 92	Kriegsmarine	World War II: The Artilleriefährprahm was scuttled at Zijpe, North Holland.
F 829	Kriegsmarine	World War II: The Type DM minelayer Marinefährprahm was sunk by an air attack at Zijpe, North Holland.
G 104	Kriegsmarine	World War II: The submarine chaser was sunk in an American air raid on Fiume, Adriatic Littoral Zone.
Kiebitz	Kriegsmarine	World War II: The minelayer was bombed and sunk by American aircraft in the harbour at Fiume. Raised, repaired and returned to service post war by the Yugoslav Navy as training ship and presidential yacht Galeb.
HMS LCP(L) 133	Royal Navy	The landing craft personnel (large) (5.9/8.2 t, 1942) was lost.
HMS LCP(L) 302	Royal Navy	The landing craft personnel (large) (5.9/8.2 t, 1942) was lost.
HMS LCT(R) 457	Royal Navy	World War II: The landing craft tank (350 GRT) struck a mine and sank in the North Sea northwest of Ostend (51°25′N 2°44′E). 24 crew were killed.
HMS LCT 1002	Royal Navy	The LCT-4-class landing craft tank (546 GRT) was in a poor state after operations on the beaches of Normandy and was towed across Channel. Despite constant use of the pumps she was taking too much water and was in danger of foundering. The crew was removed and she was towed aground at Cracknore Hard, Southampton. She was later written off as a constructive total loss.
Nachi	Imperial Japanese Navy	World War II: The Myōkō-class cruiser was bombed, torpedoed and damaged in Manila Bay 12 miles (19 km) north east of Corregidor (14°31′N 120°44′E) by aircraft based on USS Lexington and USS Ticonderoga (both United States Navy). Her bow and stern were blown off, with the bow sinking immediately. She sank eight hours later with the loss of her captain, 74 officers of the Imperial Japanese Navy Fifth Fleet's staff, and 732 crewmen. Two hundred and twenty survivors were rescued by Kasumi and Ushio (both Imperial Japanese Navy).
PB-107	Imperial Japanese Navy	World War II: The patrol boat was bombed and sunk west of the entrance to Manila Bay off Lubang Island, Philippines (14°23′N 120°25′E) by Grumman F4F Wildcat aircraft of the United States Navy. Her commanding officer and 34 crewmen were killed, 54 crew were wounded.
USS PT-320	United States Navy	World War II: The ELCO 80'-class PT boat (51 GRT) was sunk by a direct bomb hit scored by a Japanese bomber in San Pedro Bay off Leyte, Philippines (11°11′N 125°05′E). Fourteen crew were killed. Only one survived.
TA21	Kriegsmarine	World War II: The torpedo boat, a former Indomito-class destroyer, was sunk in an American air raid on Fiume.

== 6 November ==
List of shipwrecks: 6 November 1944
Ship	State	Description
HMS LCT 609	Royal Navy	The LCT-1-class landing craft tank (350/586 t, 1943) was lost in a storm off Ostend, West Flanders, Belgium.
Marifu Maru	Japan	World War II: The tanker was sunk off Leyte, Philippines by aircraft from USS Ticonderoga (United States Navy).
Marion Moller	United Kingdom	World War II: The cargo ship (3,827 GRT, 1909) was torpedoed and sunk in the Bay of Bengal off Ceylon (10°40′N 81°10′E) by Ro-113 (Imperial Japanese Navy). Her 71 crew survived.
Oxhoft	Germany	World War II: The cargo ship was bombed and sunk by Allied aircraft at Hamburg, Germany.
Palembang	Netherlands	The cargo ship struck a submerged wreck off Alexandria, Egypt and was abandoned the next day She sank on 15 November. The wreck was scrapped in situ in 1950.
Schiffbek	Germany	World War II: The transport struck a mine and sank in the Baltic Sea off Liepāja, Latvia (56°32′N 20°54′E).
Stettiner Greif	Germany	World War II: The cargo ship was sunk at Hamburg in an Allied air raid. She was raised post-war, repaired and returned to service.
T-139	Imperial Japanese Navy	World War II: The No. 103-class landing ship was bombed and sunk in Silanguin Bay, Luzon, Philippines (14°35′N 120°55′E) by US carrier aircraft.

== 7 November ==
List of shipwrecks: 7 November 1944
Ship	State	Description
USS Albacore	United States Navy	World War II: The Gato-class submarine struck a mine and sank in the Pacific Ocean off Hokkaidō, Japan with the loss of all sixty crew.
Kiri Maru No. 8	Imperial Japanese Navy	World War II: The Kiri Maru No. 8-class auxiliary transport ship was torpedoed and sunk in the Pacific Ocean 50 nautical miles (93 km; 58 mi) south of Shizuoka (34°34′N 138°35′E) by USS Greenling (United States Navy). 46 passengers and 3 crew were killed.
Kota Maru	Japan	World War II: The tanker was torpedoed and sunk in the Pacific Ocean 50 nautical miles (93 km; 58 mi) south of Shizuoka (34°34′N 138°35′E) by USS Greenling (United States Navy). Lost with all hands.
HM LST-420	Royal Navy	World War II: The tank landing ship (1,625/4,080 t, 1943) was sunk by a mine in the English Channel.
Velebit	Yugoslav Partisans	The transport boat was sunk by an accidental explosion.

== 8 November ==
List of shipwrecks: 8 November 1944
Ship	State	Description
Aquila	Germany	World War II: The cargo ship was bombed and sunk in Frøysjøen, Norway by Bristol Beaufighter aircraft of 144 Squadron Royal Air Force and 404 Squadron, Royal Canadian Air Force.
Banei Maru	Japan	World War II: The tanker was torpedoed and sunk west of Mindoro, Philippines by USS Hardhead (United States Navy).
Framnæs	Norway	World War II: The coaster (307 GRT, 1858) was bombed and damaged in Frøysjøen, Norway by Bristol Beaufighter aircraft of 144 Squadron, Royal Air Force and 404 Squadron, Royal Canadian Air Force, with the loss of six lives. She was beached at Austnes. Later refloated, but laid up. Repaired post-war and returned to service.
USS Growler	United States Navy	World War II: The Gato-class submarine was sunk in the Pacific Ocean by CD-19, Chiburi and Shigure (all Imperial Japanese Navy) with the loss of all 60 crew.
Hakko Maru	Japan	World War II: The cargo ship was torpedoed and sunk in the Yellow Sea by USS Queenfish (United States Navy).
Helga Ferdinand	Germany	World War II: The cargo ship was bombed and sunk in Frøysjøen by Bristol Beaufighter aircraft of 144 Squadron, Royal Air Force and 404 Squadron, Royal Canadian Air Force.
HMML 916	Royal Navy	World War II: The Fairmile B motor launch (76/86 t, 1944) was sunk by a mine off Walsoorden, Zeeland, Netherlands. There were only two survivors. Nineteen men were killed.
Keijo Maru	Japan	World War II: The cargo ship was torpedoed and sunk in the Yellow Sea by USS Queenfish (United States Navy).
Manei Maru	Imperial Japanese Navy	World War II: The oiler (a.k.a. Banei Maru and Men'ei Maru) was torpedoed and sunk (13°30′N 119°25′E) by USS Hardhead (United States Navy). Thirty-six crewmen were killed.
Nichinan Maru No.2	Japan	World War II: Convoy MASHI-03: The tanker was torpedoed and broke in two with the stern sinking this day and the bow sinking the next day in the South China Sea west of the Philippines (14°10′N 116°37′E) by USS Redfin (United States Navy). Eighty troops, five gunners, and a crewman were killed.
Ryūsei Maru	Imperial Japanese Navy	World War II: The auxiliary submarine chaser was torpedoed and sunk in the Yellow Sea by the submarine USS Queenfish (United States Navy).
Sagi	Imperial Japanese Navy	World War II: The Ōtori-class torpedo boat was torpedoed and sunk in the South China Sea 60 nautical miles (110 km) west south west of Cape Bolinao (16°09′N 118°56′E) by USS Gunnel (United States Navy).
Shimotsu Maru	Japan	World War II: The tanker was torpedoed and sunk in the Pacific Ocean by USS Barbero.
Svanhild	Denmark	The cargo ship collided with Fortuna (Germany) and sank in the Baltic Sea. Her crew survived.
West Humhaw	United States	World War II: The cargo ship was torpedoed and sunk in the Atlantic Ocean (4°2′N 2°42′W) by U-161 (Kriegsmarine). Her 59 crew survived.

== 9 November ==
List of shipwrecks: 9 November 1944
Ship	State	Description
Chojusan Maru	Imperial Japanese Navy	World War II: Convoy TAMA-28: The Kongosan Maru-class auxiliary gunboat was sunk 50 nautical miles (93 km; 58 mi) off Kyushu around 13.5 nautical miles (25.0 km; 15.5 mi) west north west of Suzume Island, Uji Islands (31°15′N 129°10′E) by USS Queenfish (United States Navy). One crewman was killed.
Daihatsu landing barges	Imperial Japanese Army	World War II: Battle of Ormoc Bay: 40+ landing barges were either driven ashore and buried in sand by a typhoon on 8 November or sunk by US air attacks on the morning of 9 November.
Hishi Maru No.2	Imperial Japanese Navy	World War II: Convoy B-02: The oiler was torpedoed and sunk in the Mindoro Strait (12°24′N 120°45′E) by USS Haddo (United States Navy). Eleven crewmen were killed.
MAL 25	Kriegsmarine	The MAL 1a type landing fire support lighter was wrecked on this date.
MRS 3 Bali	Kriegsmarine	The minesweeper (1,428 GRT, 1928) sank in a storm at Dordrecht, Netherlands. Later raised, repaired and returned to service.
Shimotsu Maru	Japan	World War II: Convoy MASHI-03: The oiler was torpedoed and sunk in the South China Sea (14°32′N 116°52′E) by USS Barbero (United States Navy). Nine troops and 30 crewmen were killed.
Sperrbrecher 190	Kriegsmarine	World War II: The Sperrbrecher was sunk at Svendborg, Denmark by saboteurs.
U-537	Kriegsmarine	World War II: The Type IXC/40 submarine was torpedoed and sunk in the Java Sea east of Surabaya, Netherlands East Indies (7°13′S 115°17′E) by USS Flounder (United States Navy) with the loss of all 58 crew.

== 10 November ==
List of shipwrecks: 10 November 1944
Ship	State	Description
Amgun	Soviet Navy	World War II: The auxiliary gunboat was damaged by mines off Tallinn and sank while under tow. One Soviet sailor was killed.
CD-11	Imperial Japanese Navy	World War II: Convoy TA-4: The Type C escort ship was skip-bombed by North American B-25 Mitchell aircraft north of Cebu (10°51′N 124°32′E) and was beached. Eighty-nine crewmen were killed. Fifty-nine survivors were rescued by CD-13 (Imperial Japanese Navy). CD-13 then destroyed the wreck with gunfire.
Carl Cords	Germany	World War II: The cargo ship was torpedoed and sunk in the Baltic Sea off Ventspils, Latvia (57°30′N 21°23′E) by Shch-309 (Soviet Navy).
Celebes Maru	Imperial Japanese Army	World War II: Convoy TA-3: The Celebes Maru No. 1-class transport ran aground on Subunguin Reef in the Sibuyan Sea (13°17′N 122°27′E) during a storm. On 11 November, some 1,500 troops were rescued by T-6, T-9, and T-10, (all Imperial Japanese Navy). While aground she was attacked by aircraft on 14 November. A crewman was killed and eleven were wounded. While still aground she was bombed and destroyed on 15 November by a Consolidated PB4Y Liberator of the United States Navy. Eighty-eight troops and five crewmen were killed. Five-hundred and sixty troops and an unknown number of crewmen were rescued by motor-sailers Koa Maru, Koyo Maru, Ebisu Maru, Myojin Maru, Shinriki Maru, Eiho Maru, Miyuki Maru, Shinsei Maru (all Japan).
Empire Wold	United Kingdom	World War II: The Warrior-class rescue tug (268 GRT, 1942) foundered in heavy seas off Iceland probably at (64°29′N 23°04′W) while going to the aide of Shirvan (United Kingdom) and Godafoss (Iceland). Lost with all 16 (or 9 crewmen and 1 gunner) hands. Wreck located in 2018.
Godafoss	Iceland	World War II: Convoy UR 142: The passenger ship was torpedoed and sunk in the Atlantic Ocean off Iceland by U-300 (Kriegsmarine) when she stopped against orders to help rescue survivors of Shirvan (United Kingdom) with the loss of 14 crew and 10 passengers including a family of 5 (2 doctors and 3 children). Survivors were rescued by HNoMS Honningsvåg (Royal Norwegian Navy) and HMS Northern Reward (Royal Navy).
Gokoku Maru	Imperial Japanese Navy	World War II: The Hokoku Maru-class armed merchant cruiser was torpedoed and sunk in the Pacific Ocean 7 nautical miles (13 km) off Koshiki Jima, eastern Kyushu, Japan (33°31′N 129°19′E) by USS Barb (United States Navy). Three hundred and twenty-six passengers and crew were killed.
HMS Hydra	Royal Navy	World War II: The Algerine-class minesweeper (1,030/1,325 t, 1943) struck a mine in the North Sea off Ostend, West Flanders, Belgium and was severely damaged. She was taken in to Sheerness, Kent but was declared a constructive total loss. HMS Hydra was consequently scrapped post-war.
Kashii Maru	Imperial Japanese Army	World War II: Convoy TA-3: The Kashii Maru-class transport was bombed and sunk north of Cebu, Philippines (10°53′N 124°25′E) by North American B-25 Mitchell, Republic P-47 Thunderbolt, and Lockheed P-38 Lightning aircraft of the United States Thirteenth Air Force. 16 gunners and three crew killed.
Koa Maru	Japan	World War II: The motor-sailor was strafed by a Consolidated B-24 Liberator aircraft and run aground near Batangas.
Kozu Maru	Japan	World War II: Convoy TA-3: The cargo ship was bombed and sunk north of Cebu, Philippines (10°53′N 124°25′E) by North American B-25 Mitchell, Republic P-47 Thunderbolt, and Lockheed P-38 Lightning aircraft of the United States Thirteenth Air Force. Sunk with all hands, 104 crewmen and 243 gunners.
HMS LCP(S) 129	Royal Navy	The landing craft, personnel (small) (3/5.5 t, 1943) was lost on this date.
USS Mount Hood	United States Navy	USS Mount Hood The Mount Hood-class ammunition ship exploded and sank at Seeadler Harbor, Manus, Admiralty Islands with the loss of all 350 crew on board, as well as 82 crew of USS Mindanao. Thirteen landing ship mediums were sunk, as well as eight smaller vessels.
Myojin Maru	Japan	World War II: The motor-sailor was strafed by a Consolidated B-24 Liberator aircraft and run aground near Batangas.
PB-46	Imperial Japanese Navy	World War II: The patrol boat, a former Wakatake-class destroyer, was torpedoed and sunk in Suruga Bay south west of Cape Iru, Japan (34°30′N 138°34′E) by USS Greenling (United States Navy).
USS PT-321	United States Navy	World War II: The ELCO 80'-class PT boat ran aground in San Isidro Bay, Leyte, Philippines (11°25′N 124°19′E) after attacking Convoy TA-3 and was scuttled.
Shirvan	United Kingdom	World War II: Convoy UR 142: The tanker (6,017 GRT, 1925) was torpedoed and sunk in the Atlantic Ocean (64°08′N 22°50′W) by U-300 (Kriegsmarine) with the loss of eighteen of her 45 crew. Survivors were rescued by HNoMS Honningsvåg (Royal Norwegian Navy) and HMT Northern Reward (Royal Navy).
Stockholm	Denmark	The cargo ship sprang a leak after hitting a wreck and foundered in the Baltic Sea. There was no casualty.
Sumiyoshi Maru	Imperial Japanese Navy	The Sumiyoshi Maru-class naval trawler/auxiliary storeship (113 GRT 1934) was lost on this date.
Takatsu Maru	Imperial Japanese Army	World War II: Convoy TA-4: The Takatsu Maru-class landing craft carrier (a.k.a. Kozu Maru, Kotsu Maru and Koshin Maru) was bombed and sunk in Ormoc Bay (10°50′N 124°34′E) by North American B-25 Mitchells of the United States Thirteenth Air Force. 243 gunners and 104 crewmen were killed. A few survivors were rescued by CD-11 and CD-13 (both Imperial Japanese Navy).
V 6327	Kriegsmarine	The KFK 2-class naval drifter/Vorpostenboot was sunk on this date.

== 11 November ==
List of shipwrecks: 11 November 1944
Ship	State	Description
Anna Peters	Germany	World War II: The cargo ship was mined and sunk off Fredrikshavn, Denmark.
CHa-76	Imperial Japanese Navy	World War II: The CHa-1-class submarine chaser was sunk in the East China Sea between Jeju and Tsushima (33°48′N 128°20′E) by USS Sea Owl (United States Navy).
Hamanami	Imperial Japanese Navy	World War II: Convoy TA-3: The Yūgumo-class destroyer was bombed and sunk in Ormoc Bay (10°50′N 124°31′E) by United States Navy aircraft. Sixty-three crew were killed and 42 were wounded. One hundred and sixty-seven survivors were rescued by Asashimo (Imperial Japanese Navy).
Hokoku Maru	Imperial Japanese Navy	The auxiliary cruiser was shelled and sunk by the tanker Ondina (Netherlands) and sank in the Indian Ocean 550 nautical miles (1,020 km) south south west of the Cocos Islands.
Kasagisan Maru	Imperial Japanese Navy	World War II: The Kachogasan Maru-class auxiliary transport ship ran aground in a storm off San Fernando, Luzon, Philippines (16°37′N 120°19′E) in a storm. Still stranded she was bombed and damaged beyond repair on the 25th by aircraft from USS Essex and USS Langley (both United States Navy) and abandoned. 34 crewmen were killed.
Koa Maru No. 2 GO	Imperial Japanese Navy	World War II: The Koa Maru No. 2 GO-class auxiliary transport was bombed one nautical mile (1.9 km; 1.2 mi) north of Cape Matuko, Batangas, Philippines (13°39′N 121°03′E). She was run aground at unknown location off the Mabacong coast and burned out. Eight crew and two gunners were killed.
Mikasa Maru	Imperial Japanese Army	World War II: Convoy TA-3: The Maya Maru-class auxiliary transport ship was bombed and sunk in Ormoc Bay Leyte Island, Philippines by United States Navy aircraft. Seventy-two crewmen and 47 troops were killed.
Misaki Maru	Japan	World War II: Convoy MAYU-10: The cargo ship was torpedoed and sunk in the South China Sea south of the Paracel Islands (15°10′N 112°40′E) by USS Barbel (United States Navy). Three crewmen and eight others were killed.
Naganami	Imperial Japanese Navy	World War II: Convoy TA-3: The Yūgumo-class destroyer was bombed and sunk in Ormoc Bay (10°50′N 124°31′E) by United States Navy aircraft. One hundred fifty-six people were killed, 72 survivors were rescued by Asashimo (Imperial Japanese Navy).
Ondina	Netherlands	The tanker was shelled and set afire in the Indian Ocean 550 nautical miles (1,020 km) south south west of the Cocos Islands by Hokoko Maru (Imperial Japanese Navy) and was abandoned by her 56 crew, who were machine gunned in the water by Aikoko Maru (Imperial Japanese Navy). Survivors subsequently reboarded the ship, extinguished the fire and sailed to Fremantle, Western Australia, arriving on 18 November.
Palang Maru	Japan	World War II: The coaster was torpedoed and sunk in the Strait of Malacca by HMS Tantalus (Royal Navy).
USS Scamp	United States Navy	World War II: The Gato-class submarine was depth charged and damaged by a patrol bomber of the 91st N.A.G., then depth charged and sunk south of Tokyo Bay, north of Hachijo Island, (33°38′N 141°00′E) by CD-4 (Imperial Japanese Navy) with the loss of all 60 crew.
Seiho Maru	Japan	World War II: Convoy TA-3: The cargo ship was bombed sunk in Ormoc Bay by United States Navy aircraft. Eighty-six crewmen and 44 troops were killed.
Shimakaze	Imperial Japanese Navy	World War II: Convoy TA-3: The destroyer was bombed and sunk in Ormoc Bay (10°50′N 124°31′E) by United States Navy aircraft.
Taizan Maru	Japan	World War II: Convoy TA-3: The cargo ship was bombed sunk in Ormoc Bay Leyte Island, Philippines (10°50′N 124°35′E) by United States Navy carrier-based aircraft. Sixty-five crewmen, and as many as 2,000 troops, were killed.
Tensyo Maru	Japan	World War II: Convoy TA-3: The cargo ship was bombed sunk in Ormoc Bay Leyte Island, Philippines (10°50′N 124°53′E) by United States Navy aircraft. 76 crewmen, and as many as 2,000 troops, were killed.
U-771	Kriegsmarine	World War II: The Type VIIC submarine was torpedoed and sunk in Andfjord (69°17′N 16°28′E) by HMS Venturer (Royal Navy) with the loss of all 51 crew.
U-1200	Kriegsmarine	World War II: The Type VIIC submarine was depth charged and sunk in the Atlantic Ocean south of Ireland (50°24′N 9°10′W) by HMS Kenilworth Castle, HMS Launceston Castle, HMS Pevensey Castle and HMS Portchester Castle (all Royal Navy) with the loss of all 53 crew.
UJ-1808	Kriegsmarine	World War II: The naval trawler was sunk by Allied aircraft.
Unkai Maru	Japan	World War II: The cargo ship was torpedoed and sunk in the South China Sea by USS Raton (United States Navy).
V 1802 Orient	Kriegsmarine	World War II: The Vorpostenboot was sunk in the Baltic Sea off Memel by Soviet aircraft.
W-22	Imperial Japanese Navy	World War II: The W-19-class minesweeper was sunk by a mine off Babelthuap, Palau.
W-30	Imperial Japanese Navy	World War II: Convoy TA-3: The W-19-class minesweeper was bombed and sunk in Ormoc Bay (10°50′N 124°31′E) by United States Navy aircraft.
Wakatsuki	Imperial Japanese Navy	World War II: Convoy TA-3: The Akizuki-class destroyer was bombed and sunk in Ormoc Bay (10°50′N 124°31′E) by United States Navy aircraft.

== 12 November ==
List of shipwrecks: 12 November 1944
Ship	State	Description
Alexander Majors	United States	The Liberty ship was hit by a Japanese kamikaze attack off Leyte, Philippines and set afire. Although severely damaged, she was repaired and returned to service.
CHa-84	Imperial Japanese Navy	World War II: The No.1-class auxiliary submarine chaser was sunk off Balabac, Philippines by American aircraft.
Cornouaille	Vichy France	World War II: Convoy KS357: The cargo ship was shelled and sunk south east of Egersund, Norway by HMS Bellona, HMS Kent, HMS Myngs, HMS Verulam, HMS Zambesi, (all Royal Navy) and HMCS Algonquin (Royal Canadian Navy).
Greif	Germany	World War II: Convoy KS357: The cargo ship was sunk with gunfire off Egersund by HMS Bellona, HMS Kent, HMS Myngs, HMS Verulam, HMS Zambesi, (all Royal Navy) and HMCS Algonquin (Royal Canadian Navy).
Gyokuyo Maru	Imperial Japanese Navy	World War II: Convoy MOMA-07: The Type 1K Standard Merchant-class ore carrier was torpedoed and damaged 248 nautical miles (459 km; 285 mi) southwest of Nagasaki (31°30′N 125°57′E) by USS Barb (United States Navy). She was torpedoed and sunk while under tow in the East China Sea 155 nautical miles (287 km; 178 mi) east of Shanghai (31°04′N 123°56′E) by USS Spadefish (United States Navy) on 14 November. Casualties unknown, most crew and passengers removed after earlier torpedoing.
I-38	Imperial Japanese Navy	World War II: The submarine was depth charged and sunk in the Pacific Ocean off Palau by USS Nicholas (United States Navy.
KT 35	Kriegsmarine	World War II: The transport ship was destroyed in an Allied air raid on Genoa, Italy.
KT 36	Kriegsmarine	World War II: The transport ship was damaged in an Allied air raid on Monoglia, Italy. She was beached.
USS LCI(L)-684	United States Navy	World War II: The LCI-351-class landing craft infantry was damaged beyond repair by a kamikaze off Leyte, Philippines, and beached. All aboard survived. She was later surveyed and stricken.
Lee S. Overman	United States	Lee S. Overman World War II: The Liberty ship struck a mine and sank in the English Channel off Le Havre, Charente-Maritime, France.
M-416 and M-427	Kriegsmarine	World War II: Convoy KS357: The Type 1940 minesweepers were shelled and sunk off Egersund by HMS Bellona, HMS Kent, HMS Myngs, HMS Verulam HMS Zambesi, (all Royal Navy) and HMCS Algonquin (Royal Canadian Navy).
HMAS Marlean	Royal Australian Navy	The channel patrol boat caught fire in Sydney Harbour, Australia, and burned to the waterline.
Naruo Maru	Imperial Japanese Army	World War II: Convoy MOMA-07: The Narou Maru-class auxiliary transport was torpedoed, blew up and sank 248 nautical miles (459 km; 285 mi) south west of Nagasaki (31°30′N 125°57′E) by USS Barb (United States Navy). A total of 490 troops, 131 gunners and 72 crewmen were killed.
Sugiyama Maru	Japan	World War II: Convoy MAYU-10: The cargo ship was torpedoed and sunk in the South China Sea south of the Paracel Islands (15°15′N 112°10′E) by USS Barbel (United States Navy). Many troops and 15 crewmen were killed; 652 Survivors of Sugiyama Maru and Misaki Maru (sunk the previous day) were rescued by W-17, W-18, and W-20 (all Imperial Japanese Navy).
Tatsuaki Maru	Japan	World War II: Convoy MOMA-07: The cargo ship was torpedoed and sunk in the Yellow Sea (31°46′N 125°40′E) by USS Peto (United States Navy). A total of 125 troops, 20 gunners, and 65 crewmen were killed.
Tirpitz	Kriegsmarine	Tirpitz following Operation Catechism. World War II: Operation Catechism: The Bismarck-class battleship was bombed and capsized at Tromsø, Norway, by bombing from Avro Lancaster aircraft of 9 and 617 Squadrons, Royal Air Force with the loss of at least 950 lives. She was scrapped in situ 1948–57.
UJ 1221	Kriegsmarine	World War II: Convoy KS357: The KUJ-class submarine chaser was sunk off Egersund by HMS Bellona, HMS Kent, HMS Myngs HMS Verulam HMS Zambesi, (all Royal Navy) and HMCS Algonquin (Royal Canadian Navy).
UJ 1223	Kriegsmarine	World War II: Convoy KS357: The KUJ-class submarine chaser was sunk off Egersund by HMS Bellona, HMS Kent, HMS Myngs HMS Verulam HMS Zambesi, (all Royal Navy) and HMCS Algonquin (Royal Canadian Navy).

== 13 November ==
List of shipwrecks: 13 November 1944
Ship	State	Description
Akebono	Imperial Japanese Navy	World War II: The Fubuki-class destroyer was bombed and sinks the next day at the Cavite Navy Yard, Manila, Philippines (14°35′N 120°50′E) by United States Navy aircraft. Of her 230 crew, 48 were killed and 43 were wounded.
Akishimo	Imperial Japanese Navy	World War II: The Yūgumo-class destroyer was bombed and sinks the next day at the Cavite Navy Yard (14°35′N 120°50′E) by United States Navy aircraft. Fifteen crew were killed and 25 were wounded.
CHa-116	Imperial Japanese Navy	World War II: The CHa-112-class auxiliary submarine chaser was bombed and sunk in Manila Bay, Philippines by United States Navy aircraft.
Carl Zeiss	Kriegsmarine	World War II: The training ship was under tow to Dünemünde where she was to be sunk as a blockship, but sprang a leak, foundering the next day (58°52′N 20°38′E). Shch-310 (Soviet Navy) claimed to have torpedoed and sunk her.
Daito Maru	Imperial Japanese Navy	World War II: The guard ship was bombed and sunk in Manila Bay (14°29′N 120°55′E) by United States Navy aircraft.
Eiwa Maru	Japan	World War II: The Standard Type 2AT oiler was bombed and sunk by in Manila Bay (14°35′N 120°55′E) by United States Navy aircraft.
Fl.B 529	Kriegsmarine	World War II: The Flugsicherungsboot was sunk off Lindesnes, Norway by de Havilland Mosquito aircraft of 235 and 248 Squadrons, Royal Air Force.
Gassan Maru	Japan	World War II: The coaster was torpedoed and sunk off the Kuril Islands by USS Seal (United States Navy).
Hatsuharu	Imperial Japanese Navy	World War II: The Hatsuharu-class destroyer was bombed and sunk in Manila Bay (14°35′N 120°50′E) by United States Navy aircraft with the loss of twelve of her 230 crew.
Hatsu Maru	Japan	World War II: The cargo ship was bombed and sunk in Manila Bay (14°35′N 120°55′E) by United States Navy aircraft.
Heian Maru	Japan	World War II: The cargo ship was sunk in the South China Sea (14°35′N 120°55′E) by United States Navy carrier-based aircraft.
I-12	Imperial Japanese Navy	World War II: The A2 type submarine was hedgehogged and sunk in the Pacific Ocean east of Hawaii by USS Ardent and USS Rockford (both United States Navy).
Kakogawa Maru	Imperial Japanese Army	World War II: The Type 2A Wartime Standard cargo ship was bombed and sunk in Manila Bay (14°35′N 120°55′E) by United States Navy aircraft.
Kinka Maru	Imperial Japanese Army	World War II: The Kinka Maru-class auxiliary anti-aircraft transport ship (9,301 GRT 1937) was set on fire by a Curtiss SB2C Helldiver aircraft that failed to pull out of a dive, crashing into her in Manila Bay (14°25′N 120°55′E). She sank on 16 November off Kafukaben on the Bataan Peninsula, Manila Bay.
Kiso	Imperial Japanese Navy	World War II: The Kuma-class cruiser was bombed and sunk in Manila Bay eight nautical miles (15 km; 9.2 mi) west of Cavite Navy Yard (14°35′N 120°50′E) by aircraft based on USS Cowpens, USS Enterprise, USS Essex, USS Hornet, USS Langley, USS Monterey, and USS Ticonderoga. 89 people were killed and 105 wounded, mostly Fifth Fleet staff personnel. The wreck was refloated on 15 December 1955 and scrapped in 1956.
M 427	Kriegsmarine	The minesweeper was wrecked off Sogndalstrand, Norway.
Muro Maru	Imperial Japanese Navy	World War II: The Nachi Maru-class auxiliary hospital ship (1,600 GRT 1926) was sunk by US carrier aircraft 17 miles (27 km) outside of Manila Bay. Thirty-two crew were killed.
Neptun	Norway	World War II: The cargo ship (1,574 GRT, 1930) was sunk at Bergen, Norway by explosives in an operation by the Norwegian resistance movement. Raised in 1945, repaired and returned to service.
Nishi Maru	Japan	World War II: The cargo ship was bombed and sunk at Manila by United States Navy carrier-based aircraft.
Okinami	Imperial Japanese Navy	World War II: The Yūgumo-class destroyer was bombed and sunk 8 nautical miles (15 km) west of Manila (14°35′N 120°50′E) by United States Navy aircraft. Fourteen crew were killed and 19 were wounded.
Ondo	Imperial Japanese Navy	World War II: The Shiretoko-class oiler was bombed and sunk in Manila Bay (14°29′N 120°55′E) by United States Navy aircraft.
R 32	Kriegsmarine	World War II: The Type R-25 minesweeper was sunk west of Lindenes by de Havilland Mosquito aircraft of 235 and 248 Squadrons, Royal Air Force.
Saude	Norway	The coaster (325 GRT, 1897) collided with U-1052 (Kriegsmarine) near Bergen, Norway, (60°20′N 5°10′E) and sank. All 51 people on board were rescued.
Seiwa Maru	Japan	World War II: The cargo ship was bombed and sunk in Manila Bay (14°35′N 120°55′E) by United States Navy aircraft.
Sekiho Maru	Japan	World War II: The tanker was bombed and sunk in Manila Bay (14°35′N 120°55′E) by United States Navy aircraft.
Shinkoku Maru	Imperial Japanese Army	World War II: The Type 1C Standard cargo ship/transport (2,746 GRT 1943) (a.k.a. Shigyoku Maru) was bombed and sunk in Manila Bay (14°35′N 120°55′E) by United States Navy carrier aircraft from Task Force 38.
Stad Dordrecht	Germany	World War II: The cargo ship struck a mine and sank in Kiel Bay.
Taitoku Maru	Japan	World War II: The cargo ship was bombed and sunk in Manila Bay (14°35′N 120°55′E) by United States Navy aircraft.
Teiyu Maru	Japan	World War II: The government-owned British Standard WWI B-class cargo ship was bombed and sunk in Manila Bay off Pier No.7 (14°35′N 120°55′E) by United States Navy aircraft from Task Force 38. Seventeen crew were killed.
UJ 1713	Kriegsmarine	World War II: Convoy KS357: The KUJ-class submarine chaser was sunk off Egersund by HMS Bellona, HMS Kent, HMS Myngs HMS Verulam HMS Zambesi, (all Royal Navy) and HMCS Algonquin (Royal Canadian Navy) with the loss of 26 lives.
V 1708 Süd III	Kriegsmarine	World War II: The Vorpostenboot was severely damaged at Helsingør, Zealand, Denmark due to sabotage.

== 14 November ==
List of shipwrecks: 14 November 1944
Ship	State	Description
Aoki Maru	Japan	World War II: The government-owned cargo ship was bombed and sunk in Manila Bay (14°35′N 120°55′E) by United States Navy aircraft from Task Force 38.
Ayagiri Maru	Japan	World War II: The oiler was bombed and sunk in the Mindoro Sea (12°40′N 120°41′E) by Grumman F6F Hellcat aircraft based on USS Yorktown (United States Navy). Four crewmen were killed.
CD-7	Imperial Japanese Navy	World War II: Convoy MATA-32: The Type C escort ship was torpedoed and sunk in the South China Sea off Cape Bolinao (17°46′N 117°57′E) by USS Ray (United States Navy). One hundred and fifty-six crewmen were killed.
CHANT 4	United Kingdom	The CHANT collided with the tug Sun VIII (United Kingdom) in the Thames Estuary and was damaged. She was repaired and returned to service.
Goffredo Mameli	Germany	World War II: The cargo ship was bombed by Allied aircraft and sunk off Trieste, Italy. She was refloated in September 1946 and scrapped.
Gula	Norway	World War II: The coaster (263 GRT, 1910) was bombed and damaged off Dingja, Norway by Allied aircraft. She was beached with the loss of five lives. Later refloated and towed to Leirvik, Norway for repairs.
Harley	United Kingdom	The cargo ship (400 GRT, 1919) foundered in the North Sea off the coast of Scotland (56°18′00″N 2°09′12″W) after springing a leak. Seven men were lost.
Heiyo	Imperial Japanese Navy	World War II: The survey ship, a former 24-class sloop, struck a mine and sank in the Java Sea off the entrance to Adang Bay, Borneo (01°45′S 116°35′E).
Sardinen	Norway	World War II: The fishing trawler (177 GRT, 1894) was bombed in Sognefjord, Norway, by de Havilland Mosquito aircraft of 143, 235 and 248 Squadrons, Royal Air Force and sank after being towed to shallow waters. One man was killed. She was raised and repaired in 1945.
Unkai Maru No. 5	Japan	World War II: Convoy MATA-32: The transport was torpedoed and sunk in the South China Sea off Cape Bolinao (17°46′N 117°57′E) by USS Ray (United States Navy). Forty-three crewmen were killed.
V 6413 Fro	Kriegsmarine	World War II: The Vorpostenboot was sunk off Trondheim, Norway by aircraft based on HMS Pursuer (Royal Navy). Ten crewmen were killed and three wounded.

== 15 November ==
List of shipwrecks: 15 November 1944
Ship	State	Description
Akitsu Maru	Imperial Japanese Army	World War II: Convoy HI-81: The aircraft ferry/landing craft depot ship was torpedoed by USS Queenfish (United States Navy). One of the torpedoes set off her aft magazine holding depth charges, the explosion shattering the aft portion of the ship. As the seas hit her boilers, they exploded and she sank in the Korean Strait (33°17′N 128°11′E) with the loss of 2,093 troops including the commander of the Imperial Japanese Army's 64th Infantry Regiment, 140 gunners and 67 crew. Also 104 Maru-ni explosive motor boats (EMB) went down with the ship. The escorts rescued 310 survivors.
DB 21	Kriegsmarine	The KFK 2-class naval drifter was lost on this date.
Hinaga Maru	Japan	World War II: Convoy MI-25: The Type 1K Standard Merchant ore carrier was torpedoed and sunk in the South China Sea 9.7 nautical miles (18 km) south east of Cape Padaran, French Indochina (11°16′N 108°54′E) by USS Jack (United States Navy) with the loss of 34 troops and a crewman.
Koa Maru	Japan	World War II: The motor-sailer was attacked by a Consolidated B-24 Liberator aircraft and was beached at Batangas City, Philippines.
Kojo Maru	Imperial Japanese Navy	World War II: The guard boat was sunk off the coast of Japan by USS Saury (United States Navy).
Kurasaki	Imperial Japanese Navy	World War II: Convoy MATA-32: The Kurasaki-class fleet supply ship was torpedoed and sunk in the South China Sea west of Luzon (17°27′N 117°43′E) by USS Raton (United States Navy). Her captain and 91 crew were rescued.
HMS LCM 1101	Royal Navy	The landing craft mechanized (22/52 t, 1943) was lost on this date.
Luigi Settembrini	Regia Marina	World War II: The Luigi Settembrini-class submarine was rammed and sunk in the Atlantic Ocean west of Gibraltar (36°11′N 19°45′W) by USS Frament (United States Navy) that was towing her. Forty-two Italian crew and the three men of the US liaison team aboard were killed. The eight survivors were rescued by USS Frament.
Musson	Soviet Union	World War II: The tug was mined and sunk in the Barents Sea. Her master and eight crewmen were killed. Nine crewmen were rescued.
Myojin Maru	Japan	World War II: The motor-sailer was attacked by a Consolidated B-24 Liberator aircraft and was beached at Batangas City.
Nachiryu Maru No. 12	Imperial Japanese Navy	World War II: The guard boat was sunk off the coast of Japan by USS Silversides (United States Navy).
Nichiei Maru	Japan	World War II: The cargo ship was torpedoed and sunk in the South China Sea by USS Jack (United States Navy).
Schirmeck	Germany	World War II: The cargo ship was sunk by saboteurs at Copenhagen, Denmark.
Sugiyama Maru	Japan	World War II: The transport ship was torpedoed and sunk in the South China Sea by USS Barbel (Imperial Japanese Navy).
Toyo Maru	Japan	World War II: The cargo ship was torpedoed and sunk off Mindoro, Philippines by USS Guavina (United States Navy).
Yuzan Maru No. 2	Japan	World War II: Convoy MI-25: The tanker was torpedoed and damaged in the South China Sea 9.7 nautical miles (18 km) south east of Cape Padaran, French Indochina (11°16′N 108°54′E) by USS Jack (United States Navy). She was beached and abandoned as a total loss. Seven crewmen were killed.

== 16 November ==
List of shipwrecks: 16 November 1944
Ship	State	Description
AF 22	Kriegsmarine	World War II: The Type C Artilleriefährprahm was sunk in the Irben Strait off "Sventoi" by Soviet aircraft.
AF 26	Kriegsmarine	World War II: The Type C Artilleriefährprahm was sunk in the Baltic Sea off Ventspils, Lithuania by Soviet aircraft. She was later raised and repaired.
Kaishin Maru No. 2	Japan	World War II: The coaster was torpedoed and sunk in the Java Sea by HNLMS O-19 (Royal Netherlands Navy).
Kisaragi Maru	Imperial Japanese Navy	World War II: The auxiliary cruiser was torpedoed and sunk off the coast of Japan (29°03′N 142°12′E) by USS Scabbardfish (United States Navy). 14 men were killed.
Kyoei Maru	Imperial Japanese Navy	World War II: The Koyoei Maru-class replenishment oiler was bombed and sunk in the Tarakan Channel off Borneo (03°30′N 117°00′E) by Consolidated B-24 Liberator and Lockheed P-38 Lightning aircraft. Twenty-five passengers and a crewman were killed.
Spindrift	United States	The freighter sank north of Key West, Florida at 24°40′N 81°48′W.
Svein I	Norway	World War II: The boat (50 GRT, 1932) struck a mine and sank in Oslofjord off the Gullholmen Lighthouse, Norway with the loss of two of her five crew.
"Takashiro Maru"	Imperial Japanese Navy	Takashiro Maru World War II: The guard boat was sunk off the coast of Japan by USS Tambor (United States Navy). 2 prisoners captured.

== 17 November ==
List of shipwrecks: 17 November 1944
Ship	State	Description
Edogawa Maru	Imperial Japanese Army	World War II: Convoy Mi-27: The Type 2A Wartime Standard cargo ship was torpedoed and damaged in the Yellow Sea off Cheju Island, Korea by USS Sunfish (United States Navy). She was torpedoed again by USS Sunfish the next day and sunk (33°35′N 124°35′E) with the loss of 1,998 troops and 116 crewmen and 16 landing craft. 186 survivors were rescued by W-101 (Imperial Japanese Navy).
Esashi Maru	Japan	World War II: Convoy MATA-33: The ship was bombed by American aircraft. She was beached and abandoned north of San Fernando, Luzon, Philippines. A gunner and three crewmen were killed and 55 people were wounded.
Fusa Maru	Imperial Japanese Navy	World War II: The guard boat was shelled and severely damaged off the coast of Japan by USS Burrfish and USS Ronquil (both United States Navy). She was not repaired.
Hiyodori	Imperial Japanese Navy	World War II: Convoy MI-20: The Ōtori-class torpedo boat was torpedoed and sunk in the Pacific Ocean 140 nautical miles (260 km) east north east of Tourane, French Indochina (16°56′N 110°30′E) by USS Gunnel (United States Navy).
HMS LCT 1022	Royal Navy	The LCT-4-class landing craft tank (350/586 t, 1943) was wrecked off Dungeness, Kent.
USS LST-6	United States Navy	World War II: The landing ship tank was sunk by a mine in Seine Bay, France.
HMAS ML 827	Royal Australian Navy	The Fairmile B motor launch (76/86 t, 1944) ran aground in Jacquinot Bay, New Guinea. Refloated, but sank under tow on 20 November.
Mayasan Maru	Imperial Japanese Army	World War II: Convoy HI-81: The Mayasan Maru-class landing craft depot ship was torpedoed and sunk in the Yellow Sea 110 nautical miles (200 km) southwest of Saishu Island (33°17′N 124°41′E) by the submarine USS Spadefish (United States Navy). A total of 3,187 troops, 194 gunners, and 56 crewmen were killed. An unknown number of Maru-Ni explosive motorboats were lost. Survivors were rescued by Tsushima and CD-61 (both Imperial Japanese Navy).
NKI 01 Glommen	Kriegsmarine	World War II: The guard ship, a former Glommen-class minelayer, was bombed and sunk, or torpedoed in Trondheim Fjord by British aircraft.
No.156	Imperial Japanese Navy	World War II: The submarine chaser was torpedoed and sunk in the Yellow Sea by USS Spadefish (United States Navy).
Osakasan Maru	Japan	World War II: Convoy MI-27: The new oiler was torpedoed and sunk on her maiden voyage in the Yellow Sea off Cheju Island (33°30′N 124°30′E) by USS Peto (United States Navy). Eighty passengers and 62 crewmen were killed. 14 survivors were rescued by W-101 (Imperial Japanese Navy).
Pottstown	United States	Carrying a cargo of coal, the 194-foot (59 m), 974-gross register ton schooner barge sank during a storm without loss of life in 60 feet (18 m) of water in Cape Cod Bay off Scusset Beach, Sandwich, Massachusetts, northeast of the Scusset breakwater at 41°47′10″N 070°29′08″W.
Seisho Maru	Japan	World War II: Convoy MI-27: The Design 1019 cargo ship was torpedoed and damaged in the Yellow Sea by USS Sunfish (United States Navy). Torpedoed again by USS Sunfish and sunk the next day. A total of 412 passengers and 36 crewmen were killed. 70 survivors were rescued by W-101 (Imperial Japanese Navy).
Shin'yō	Imperial Japanese Navy	World War II: Convoy HI-81: The aircraft carrier was torpedoed and sunk in the Yellow Sea 110 nautical miles (200 km) south west of Saishu Island (33°17′N 124°41′E) by USS Spadefish (United States Navy). One thousand, one hundred and thirty people were killed; 70–200 survivors were rescued by Tsushima and CD-61 (both Imperial Japanese Navy)
Shunten Maru	Imperial Japanese Navy	World War II: The Imperial Japanese Navy-requisitioned tanker was torpedoed and sunk in the South China Sea 140 nautical miles (260 km) east north east of Tourane, French Indochina (16°45′N 110°15′E) by USS Gunnel (United States Navy).

== 18 November ==
List of shipwrecks: 18 November 1944
Ship	State	Description
August Bolten	Germany	The cargo ship ran aground at Os Municipality, Norway. The crew were rescued by V-5107 Karmöy (Kriegsmarine). August Bolten was attacked by British Motor Torpedo Boats and sank two days later.
Banshu Maru No. 17	Japan	World War II: The coaster was torpedoed and sunk in the South China Sea by USS Pampanito (United States Navy).
Chinkai Maru	Imperial Japanese Army	World War II: Convoy MI-27: The Zuikai Maru-class auxiliary transport was torpedoed and sunk in the Yellow Sea (33°35′N 124°34′E) by USS Peto (United States Navy). Seventeen gunners and 22 crewmen were killed. 36 survivors were rescued by W-101 (Imperial Japanese Navy).
F 929	Kriegsmarine	World War II: The Type DM minelayer Marinefährprahm was sunk by a German mine off Grado, Italy (45°37′N 13°22′E).
I-41	Imperial Japanese Navy	World War II: The Type B1 submarine was sunk with all 111 hands in the Philippine Sea off Leyte, Philippines (12°44′N 133°42′E) by USS Lawrence C. Taylor and USS Melvin R. Nawman and two aircraft based on USS Anzio (all United States Navy).
USS PT-311	United States Navy	World War II: The Higgins 78'-class PT boat (35 GRT) was sunk in the Mediterranean Sea west of La Spezia, Italy by a mine. Ten crewmen were killed and five survived.
Seisho Maru	Japan	World War II: Convoy MI-27: The Design 1019 cargo ship was torpedoed the Yellow Sea by the submarine USS Sunfish (United States Navy) for the second time in two days and sunk. A total of 412 passengers and 36 crewmen were killed.
Shinko Maru No.1	Japan	World War II: The cargo ship was torpedoed and sunk in the South China Sea by USS Pampanito (United States Navy).
SK-62	Soviet Navy	World War II: The guard ship was sunk in the Baltic Sea by U-679 (Kriegsmarine).
TK-807	Soviet Navy	World War II: First Battle of Sorve Cape: The motor torpedo boat was damaged in a collision with TK-801 (Soviet Navy) during the battle and was beached. Pulled off later in the evening.
HMT Transvaal	Royal Navy	The 125.3-foot (38.2 m), 250-ton diesel refueling naval trawler was last seen in the English Channel on 18 November and believed to have sank in severe weather. She was last seen 25 miles (40 km) south of Start Point. Lost with all 19 hands.
Tübingen	Kriegsmarine	(Red Cross): World War II: The hospital ship was bombed and sunk off Pola, Italy by Bristol Beaufighter aircraft of the Royal Air Force with the loss of nine of her crew.
V 5107 Karmöy	Kriegsmarine	World War II: The Vorpostenboot was sunk in Korsfjord by German artillery.

== 19 November ==
List of shipwrecks: 19 November 1944
Ship	State	Description
AF-18	Kriegsmarine	World War II: Second Battle of Sorve Cape: The Type C Artilleriefährprahm was sunk in the Baltic Sea off the Sõrve Peninsula, Soviet Union by Soviet aircraft.
BK-516	Soviet Navy	World War II: Second Battle of Sorve Cape: The motor gun boat ran aground during the battle. Pulled off later by the minesweeper T-331 (Soviet Navy).
BK-519	Soviet Navy	World War II: Second Battle of Sorve Cape: The motor gun boat ran aground during the battle coming to the aid of BK-516 (Soviet Navy). The vessel was pulled off later.
CH-36	Imperial Japanese Navy	World War II: The No.28-class submarine chaser was bombed and sunk off Subic Bay, Luzon, Philippines (14°40′N 120°15′E) by United States Navy aircraft.
Camperfehn	Germany	World War II: The barge was bombed and sunk in the Sognefjord, Norway by de Havilland Mosquito aircraft of 143, 235 and 248 Squadrons, Royal Air Force. The vessel was later raised.
F 843	Kriegsmarine	World War II: The Type D Marinefährprahm foundered in the Baltic Sea after being damaged by a Soviet bomber aircraft.
I-37	Imperial Japanese Navy	World War II: The Type B1 submarine was depth charged and sunk in the Pacific Ocean off Ulithi by USS Conklin and USS McCoy Reynolds (both United States Navy). Lost with all 113 crew.
HMS LCM 340 and HMS LCM 424	Royal Navy	The landing craft mechanized (21/35 t, 1944) were lost on this date.
M-460	Kriegsmarine	World War II: Second Battle of Sorve Cape: The minesweeper ran aground during the battle. The vessel was pulled off later.
Nichinan Maru	Japan	World War II: The transport was torpedoed and sunk in the Malacca Strait (01°37′N 102°53′E) by HMS Stratagem (Royal Navy). Nine crewmen killed.
Sardinen	Norway	World War II: The coaster was bombed and sunk in Sognefjord by de Havilland Mosquito aircraft of 143, 235 and 248 Squadrons, RAF. Raised in September 1945, repaired and returned to service in 1946 as a motor vessel. (Look 14/11/1944)
Seian Maru	Japan	World War II: The IJN-chartered emergency auxiliary oiler was bombed and sunk off Subic Bay, Luzon (14°40′N 120°15′E) by United States Navy aircraft. Five crewmen were killed.
T-331	Soviet Navy	World War II: Second Battle of Sorve Cape: The minesweeper ran aground during the battle. The vessel was pulled off later.
TK-183	Soviet Navy	World War II: Second Battle of Sorve Cape: The motor torpedo boat ran aground on rocks during the battle. The vessel was pulled off later.
112600	Soviet Union	World War II: The barge was torpedoed, shelled and sunk in the Baltic Sea off Cape Pakri by U-481 (Kriegsmarine).

== 20 November ==
List of shipwrecks: 20 November 1944
Ship	State	Description
Corinthiakos	Greece	World War II: The cargo ship was torpedoed and sunk in the Indian Ocean (25°42′S 33°27′E) by U-181 (Kriegsmarine) with the loss of eleven of her 32 crew.
Füsilier	Kriegsmarine	World War II: The troopship was sunk at Polangen, Lithuania (55°54′N 20°54′E) by Soviet artillery with the loss of 287 lives. The wreck was torpedoed on 5 December by U-475 (Kriegsmarine).
HMS LCV(P) 1103	Royal Navy	The landing craft vehicle and personnel (11/13.5 t, 1943) was lost on this date.
Ma-4	Imperial Japanese Navy	World War II: The No.1-class auxiliary minelayer was sunk in the Indian Ocean off Car Nicobar, India by HMS Tally-Ho (Royal Navy).
USS Mississinewa	United States Navy	USS Mississinewa World War II: The Cimarron-class oiler was sunk in the Pacific Ocean off Ulithi (10°06′00″N 139°42′58″E) by a Kaiten manned torpedo (Imperial Japanese Navy) with the loss of 63 of her 299 crew.
HMAS ML 827	Royal Australian Navy	The Fairmile B motor launch sank under tow after running aground in Jacquinot Bay, New Guinea, three days earlier.
T34	Kriegsmarine	World War II: The torpedo boat struck a mine and sank off Cape Arkona, Germany (54°40′N 13°29′E). 62 crewmen were killed.
UJ 2207 Cap Nord	Kriegsmarine	World War II: The naval trawler/submarine chaser was sunk in the Tyrrhenian Sea south east of Genoa, Italy by USS PT-308 (United States Navy).
V-5107 Karmøy	Kriegsmarine	World War II: The vorpostenboot (564 GRT, 1883) was shelled and sunk by artillery from Røttingen Fort, Os Municipality, Norway.
W-38	Imperial Japanese Navy	World War II: The W-19-class minesweeper was torpedoed and sunk in the South China Sea south west of Takao, Formosa (21°21′N 119°45′E) by USS Atule (United States Navy).

== 21 November ==
List of shipwrecks: 21 November 1944
Ship	State	Description
AF 86	Kriegsmarine	World War II: The Type DM Artilleriefährprahm was sunk in the North Sea off Ameland, Friesland, Netherlands by British aircraft.
DW 04 Flamingo	Kriegsmarine	World War II: The naval drifter/Vorpostenboot was sunk in the Weser by British aircraft.
DW 42 Lumme	Kriegsmarine	World War II: The naval drifter/Vorpostenboot was sunk in the Weser by British aircraft.
Eino	Estonian SSR	World War II: The tug was mined and sunk in the Gulf of Tallinn.
Empire Cutlass	United Kingdom	World War II: The landing ship, infantry (large) struck a mine in the English Channel off Le Havre, Seine-Inférieure, France and was damaged. She was towed in to Le Havre in a waterlogged condition. Subsequently repaired and returned to service.
Gyosan Maru	Japan	World War II: Convoy No. 4118: The transport was torpedoed and damaged by USS Guavina and USS Flounder (both United States Navy). Twenty-one crewmen were killed. The flaming hulk drifted ashore on Dangerous Grounds (10°39′N 115°05′E). She was then torpedoed and sunk two days later on the reef by Guavina. She rolled over and sank with the bow still on the reef.
Hokkai Maru	Imperial Japanese Navy	World War II: The Hokkai Maru-class naval trawler/auxiliary storeship (398 GRT 1934) was torpedoed and sunk off the coast of Japan 129 nautical miles (239 km; 148 mi) east of Hachijo Jima, Izu Islands (33°20′N 141°00′E) by USS Scabbardfish (United States Navy). 33 men were killed.
Kongō	Imperial Japanese Navy	World War II: The Kongō-class battlecruiser was torpedoed and sunk in the South China Sea (26°09′N 121°23′E) by USS Sealion (United States Navy) with the loss of 1,200 of her 1,360 crew.
T-206 Shpil	Soviet Navy	World War II: The minesweeper was sunk in the Baltic Sea by M 328 (Kriegsmarine).
Tutti	Estonian SSR	World War II: The tug was mined and sunk in the Gulf of Tallinn.
Urakaze	Imperial Japanese Navy	World War II: The Kagero-class destroyer was torpedoed and sunk in the South China Sea (26°09′N 121°23′E) by USS Sealion (United States Navy) with the loss of all 240 crew and several of the 126 survivors from Tanakaze (Imperial Japanese Navy).

== 22 November ==
List of shipwrecks: 22 November 1944
Ship	State	Description
CHa-82	Imperial Japanese Navy	World War II: The CHa-1-class submarine chaser was sunk off Sabah by American aircraft.
Dowa Maru	Japan	World War II: Convoy No. 4118: The transport was torpedoed and sunk in the South China Sea off the Spratly Islands (10°18′N 114°15′E) by USS Guavina (United States Navy). Nineteen crewmen were killed.
Kiel	Germany	World War II: The cargo ship was bombed, set afire, and sunk by British aircraft off Måseskär, Sweden.
M 3611 Dirk	Kriegsmarine	The minelaying naval trawler ran aground near Stilo Lighthouse and was wrecked.
HMS Stratagem	Royal Navy	World War II: The S-class submarine (865/990 t, 1943) was depth charged and sunk in the Strait of Malacca off Malacca, Malaya by CH-35 (Imperial Japanese Navy) with the loss of 38 of her 48 crew. CH-35 (Imperial Japanese Navy) rescued the 10 survivors and made them prisoners of war. Only three of them survived captivity.
T-109	Soviet Navy	The T-108-class minesweeper foundered in a storm in the Barents Sea at Sangeysky Island. 23 crew died.

== 23 November ==
List of shipwrecks: 23 November 1944
Ship	State	Description
Aegna	Estonia	The cargo liner was wrecked in the Gulf of Tallinn.
Amakusa Maru	Empire of Japan	World War II: The cargo ship was torpedoed and sunk in the Strait of Formosa by USS Bang (United States Navy).
F 119	Kriegsmarine	The Type A Marinefährprahm was sunk in a collision on this date.
Fukuju Maru	Imperial Japanese Army	World War II: Convoy TAMO-29: The Fukuju Maru-class auxiliary transport was torpedoed and sunk in the East China Sea south of Shushan Island (34°10′N 128°58′E) by USS Picuda (United States Navy). 28 crewmen killed.
Gus W. Darnell	United States	World War II: The Liberty ship was bombed or torpedoed and damaged in the Philippine Sea off Samar Island, Philippines by Japanese aircraft and was beached. She was declared a constructive total loss, but was later repaired and became USS Justin.
Hozan Maru	Japan	World War II: The cargo ship was torpedoed and sunk in the Strait of Formosa by USS Bang (United States Navy).
M 3156	Kriegsmarine	The KFK 2-class minesweeping naval drifter was wrecked on this date. Raised post war, repaired for GMSA, later to USSR for reparations.
Sakae Maru	Japan	World War II: The cargo ship was torpedoed and sunk in the Strait of Formosa by USS Bang (United States Navy).
Shuyo Maru	Imperial Japanese Army	World War II: Convoy TAMO-29: The Type 2A Wartime Standard cargo ship was torpedoed and sunk in the Tsushima Strait south of Shushan Island (34°14′N 128°28′E) by USS Picuda (United States Navy). Sixty passengers and 25 crewmen were killed.
Sjofna	Norway	The cargo ship (619 GRT, 1918) ran aground at Morwenstow, Devon, United Kingdom. All nineteen crew, two dogs and the ship's cat were rescued. Sjofna was scrapped in situ.
T-151	Imperial Japanese Navy	World War II: The No. 103-class landing ship was torpedoed and sunk in the Sulu Sea north of Sarawak, west of Palawan Island, Philippines (11°22′N 119°07′E) by USS Pomfret (United States Navy).
TK-681	Soviet Navy	The G-5-class motor torpedo boat was lost on this date.
Unknown barge	Unknown	World War II: The drifting 300-foot (91 m) barge was torpedoed and sunk in the Sulu Sea north of Sarawak, west of Palawan Island, Philippines (11°22′N 119°07′E) by USS Besugo (United States Navy) close by where T-151 had just been sunk.
William D. Burnham	United States	World War II: Convoy TMC 44: The Liberty ship (7,176 GRT) straggled behind the convoy. She was torpedoed and damaged in the English Channel (49°46′N 1°15′W) by U-978 (Kriegsmarine) with the loss of eighteen of her 68 crew. Survivors were rescued by HMT Fidget (Royal Navy). She was beached at the Grand Roads off Cherbourg, France. Refloated on 5 January 1945, she wastowed to Falmouth, Cornwall, United Kingdom but was declared a constructive total loss.
USS YP-383	United States Navy	The patrol boat was sunk in the Gulf of Panama (08°22′N 79°29′W) in a collision with USS LCI(L)-873 (United States Navy).

== 24 November ==
List of shipwrecks: 24 November 1944
Ship	State	Description
Arna	Norway	World War II: The cargo ship (4,325 GRT, 1929) was sunk at Oslo, Norway, due to sabotage by the Norwegian resistance movement. Two crewmen killed. She was raised post-war, repaired and returned to service.
Beaverhill	United Kingdom	The cargo ship ran aground on the Hillyard Reef, off Saint John, New Brunswick, Canada. She broke in two and was declared a total loss. The stern section was refloated on 11 December 1946 and towed in to Saint John, where it sank. It was refloated, towed out to sea and scuttled.
Elie	Denmark	World War II: The cargo ship struck a mine and sank in the Baltic Sea off Stolpmunde, Pomerania. There was no casualty.
Elvira Gaspar	United States	The trawler foundered off Cape Canaveral, Florida at 28°27′N 80°31′W.
Euroland	Germany	World War II: The tanker was sunk at Oslo, Norway, due to sabotage by the Norwegian resistance movement.
F 191	Kriegsmarine	World War II: The Type AM minelayer Marinefährprahm was scuttled after a collision off Sõrve peninsula. The crew and passengers were rescued.
Hansa	Sweden	World War II: The passenger ship was torpedoed and sunk in the Baltic Sea near Gotland by L-21 (Soviet Navy) with the loss of 84 lives: 62 passengers and 22 crew.
Kaprino	Norway	World War II: The tanker (3,249 GRT, 1907) was sunk at Oslo, Norway, due to sabotage by the Norwegian resistance movement.
HMS MTB 287 and HMS MTB 371	Royal Navy	World War II: The Vosper 72 foot-class motor torpedo boats (37/45 t, 1943) were wrecked off Levrera Island, Yugoslavia.
Spreeufer	Germany	World War II: The fishing trawler struck a mine and sank in the Baltic Sea north of Kolberg with the loss of five lives.
T-111, T-141 and T-160	Imperial Japanese Navy	World War II: Convoy TA-5, 1st group: The No. 103-class landing ships were bombed and sunk at Port Cataingan, Masbate Island (12°00′N 123°58′E), by Curtiss P-40 Warhawk and Republic P-47 Thunderbolt aircraft of the United States Thirteenth Air Force. Survivors were rescued by CH-46 (Imperial Japanese Navy).
Taiwan	Norway	World War II: The cargo ship (5,502 GRT, 1924) was sunk at Oslo, Norway, due to sabotage by the Norwegian resistance movement. She was raised post-war, repaired and returned to service.
Troma	Norway	World War II: The cargo ship (5,029 GRT, 1937) was sunk at Oslo, Norway, due to sabotage by the Norwegian resistance movement. She was raised post-war, repaired and returned to service in April 1947 as Max Manus.

== 25 November ==
List of shipwrecks: 25 November 1944
Ship	State	Description
CD-38	Imperial Japanese Navy	World War II: Convoy SAMA-14A: The Type D escort ship was torpedoed and sunk in Manila Bay off Corregidor, Philippines (14°22′N 119°57′E) by USS Hardhead (United States Navy).
CH-46	Imperial Japanese Navy	World War II: The CH-28-class submarine chaser was bombed and sunk in the Visiyan Sea (11°35′N 124°10′E) by United States Navy aircraft.
Debrezen	Hungary Navy	World War II: The Komarom-class river gunboat was shelled and sunk at Budapest by Soviet tanks.
Kasagisan Maru	Imperial Japanese Navy	World War II: The Kachogasan Maru-class auxiliary transport ship ran aground on 11 November off San Fernando, Luzon, Philippines (16°37′N 120°19′E) in a storm. Still stranded she was bombed and damaged beyond repair by aircraft from USS Essex and USS Langley (both United States Navy) and abandoned. 34 crewmen were killed.
Kumano	Imperial Japanese Navy	World War II: The Mogami-class cruiser was torpedoed, bombed and sunk in 108 feet (33 m) of water at Santa Cruz, Philippines (15°44′58″N 119°47′57″E) by aircraft based on USS Ticonderoga (United States Navy). 595 survivors were rescued. The vessel's captain and 398 crewmen were killed.
HMS LCV(P) 1129	Royal Navy	The landing craft vehicle and personnel (11/13.5 t, 1943) was lost on this date.
Manila Maru	Imperial Japanese Army	World War II: Convoy MISHI-12: The hospital ship was torpedoed and sunk 90 nautical miles (170 km; 100 mi) northwest of Miri, Malaya (05°42′N 113°15′E) by USS Mingo (United States Navy). Her captain, 51 gunners, and 97 crewmen were killed. Ten Daihatsu landing craft went down with the ship.
Manju Maru	Imperial Japanese Navy	World War II: Convoy MATA-34: The Santos Maru-class miscellaneous auxiliary (a.k.a. Santos Maru) was torpedoed and sunk in the South China Sea west of Luzon (20°14′N 121°40′E) by USS Atule (United States Navy). 700 troops/sailors, and 24 crewmen were killed.
Ortelsburg	Kriegsmarine	The tug was wrecked off Pillau, East Prussia.
PB-38	Imperial Japanese Navy	World War II: Convoy MATA-34: The patrol boat, a former Momi-class destroyer, was torpedoed and sunk in the South China Sea west of Luzon (20°14′N 121°14′E) by USS Atule and USS Pomfret (both United States Navy) with the loss of all crew.
USS PT-363	United States Navy	World War II: The ELCO 80'-class PT boat was shelled and sunk by shore batteries off Cape Gorango, Halmahera, Maluku Islands (00°55′N 127°50′E).
HMCS Shawinigan	Royal Canadian Navy	World War II: The Flower-class corvette (950/1,280 t, 1941) was torpedoed and sunk in the Cabot Strait, Newfoundland (at 47°34′N 59°11′W), by U-1228 (Kriegsmarine) with the loss of all 90 crew.
Shimotsuki	Imperial Japanese Navy	World War II: The Akizuki-class destroyer was torpedoed and sunk 220 nautical miles (410 km; 250 mi) east-north-east of Singapore (02°21′N 107°20′E) by USS Cavalla (United States Navy).
Shoho Maru	Imperial Japanese Navy	World War II: Convoy TAMA-32B: The Showa Maru-class auxiliary (1,365 GRT 1941) transport was torpedoed and sunk in the South China Sea west of Sabtang Island, Philippines (20°20′N 121°40′E) by USS Pomfret (United States Navy). 16 passengers, 8 gunners and 39 crewmen were killed.
T-6 and T-10	Imperial Japanese Navy	World War II: Convoy TA-5, 2nd group: The No.1-class landing ships were bombed and sunk at Port Balancau, Marinduque, Philippines (13°32′N 121°52′E) by aircraft based on USS Ticonderoga (United States Navy).
T-113 and T-142	Imperial Japanese Navy	World War II: The No. 103-class landing ships were bombed and sunk ten kilometres (6.2 mi) off the coast of Santa Cruz, Luzon, Philippines (15°40′N 119°45′E) by aircraft based on USS Ticonderoga (United States Navy).
T-161	Imperial Japanese Navy	World War II: The No. 103-class landing ship was bombed and sunk ten kilometres (6.2 mi) off the coast of Santa Cruz, Luzon, Philippines (14°50′N 119°45′E) by aircraft based on USS Ticonderoga (United States Navy).
U-482	Kriegsmarine	World War II: The Type VIIC submarine was depth charged and sunk in the Atlantic Ocean west of the Shetland Islands, United Kingdom (60°18′N 4°52′W) by HMS Ascension (Royal Navy) with the loss of all 48 crew.
Yasoshima	Imperial Japanese Navy	World War II: The Ioshima-class cruiser (a.k.a. Yasojima) was bombed and sunk in Drusol Bay, Luzon (15°00′N 119°45′E) by aircraft based on USS Ticonderoga (United States Navy). One hundred crewmen survived.

== 26 November ==
List of shipwrecks: 26 November 1944
Ship	State	Description
Agios Georgios	Greece	World War II: The schooner was sunk by a mine in the Gulf of Patras off Missolonghi, Greece. There were 28 killed.
Blairatholl	United Kingdom	The cargo ship collided with John Bakke (Norway) and sank in the Atlantic Ocean (51°25′N 48°30′W).
F 317	Kriegsmarine	The Type A Marinefährprahm ran aground east of Loppa, Norway, and was wrecked.
W-18	Imperial Japanese Navy	World War II: Convoy SATA-02: The W-17-class minesweeper was damaged in the South China Sea off Hainan Island, China (16°44′N 108°24′E) by 14th Air Force Consolidated B-24 Liberator aircraft. She is taken under tow, but sank the next day (16°52′N 108°38′E).
Yuho Maru	Imperial Japanese Navy	World War II: The Standard Type 1TM tanker was torpedoed off Miri, Malaya (04°55′N 114°17′E) by USS Pargo (United States Navy). She broke in two with the aft section sinking in the South China Sea. 26 crewmen were killed. The forward section was towed to Miri where it was beached on 2 December 1944. It was refloated and an attempt was made to tow it to Singapore, but it sank 125 nautical miles (232 km) east of Singapore on 12 December.

== 27 November ==
List of shipwrecks: 27 November 1944
Ship	State	Description
Fidelitas	Germany	World War II: The cargo ship was bombed and sunk by Allied aircraft in the Sulafjord, near Ålesund, Norway. There were 39 dead, including the Norwegian pilot and all 12 German flak gunners, and 9 survivors.
Kinka Maru	Japan	World War II: The government-owned cargo ship was sunk by aircraft in the Yangtze River.
Korsnes	Kriegsmarine	World War II: The collier (1,736 GRT, 1936) was torpedoed and sunk in the Norwegian Sea off Sandnessjøen, Norway by aircraft based on HMS Implacable (Royal Navy) with the loss of six crew. Raised in 1945 and repaired, returned to service in 1947 as Patricia.
HMS LCV(P) 1228	Royal Navy	The landing craft vehicle and personnel (11/13.5 t, 1943) was lost on this date.
Rigel	Kriegsmarine	Rigel (left) and Korsnes (right) World War II: The prisoner ship (3,828 GRT, 1924) was bombed and sunk in the Norwegian Sea off Sandnessjøen, Norway by Fairey Barracuda aircraft of the Fleet Air Arm based on HMS Implacable (Royal Navy) with the loss of 2,572 lives (official figure). The wreck was scrapped in 1969.
USS SC-744	United States Navy	World War II: The SC-497-class submarine chaser (95 GRT) was heavily damaged by a kamikaze north of Taytay Point, Leyte (10°44′N 125°07′E). Seven crewmen were killed or missing, and seven more wounded. She was towed to Tacloban where she sank on 30 November.
Spree	Germany	World War II: The cargo ship was bombed, torpedoed and severely damaged off Mosjøen, Norway by aircraft based on HMS Implacable (Royal Navy). She was salvaged in May 1945, and entered Dutch service in 1946 as Hedel.

== 28 November ==
List of shipwrecks: 28 November 1944
Ship	State	Description
Atago Maru	Japan	World War II: The oil tanker was bombed and sunk at Miri, Borneo (4°29′N 114°00′E) by Consolidated B-24 Liberator aircraft of the United States 13th Air Force.
Banga	Latvia	The cargo liner was wrecked in the Gulf of Riga.
CH-53	Imperial Japanese Navy	World War II: Convoy TA-6: The CH-28-class submarine chaser was torpedoed and sunk by USS PT-127 and USS PT-331 (both United States Navy) in Ormoc Bay, Philippines (10°59′N 124°33′E).
I-46	Imperial Japanese Navy	World War II: The Type C submarine was shelled and sunk in Leyte Gulf off Ponson Island by USS Renshaw, USS Pringle, USS Saufley and USS Waller (all United States Navy).
I-365	Imperial Japanese Navy	World War II: The Type D submarine was torpedoed and sunk by USS Scabbardfish (United States Navy) 75 nautical miles (139 km) south east of Yokosuka (34°44′N 141°01′E). One crew member survived, with four others refusing rescue.
PB-105	Imperial Japanese Navy	World War II: Convoy TA-6: The patrol boat was torpedoed by USS PT-127 and USS PT-331 (both United States Navy) in Ormoc Bay, the Philippines (10°59′N 124°33′E). She was beached and abandoned. The wreck was captured by American troops 10 days later.
Solling	Germany	World War II: The trawler was shelled and sunk in the Baltic Sea by K-51 (Soviet Navy).
T-387	Soviet Navy	World War II: The T-351 Project 253l Type MT-1-class minesweeper was torpedoed and sunk in the Baltic Sea off the Pakri Islands, Estonia (59°25′N 24°03′E) by U-481 (Kriegsmarine). 13 crew were killed.
U-80	Kriegsmarine	The Type VIIC submarine sank off Pillau, East Prussia (54°25′N 19°50′E) in a diving accident with the loss of all 50 crew.
Welheim	Germany	World War II: The cargo ship was torpedoed and sunk by HNoMS MTB 627 and HNoMS MTB 717 (both Royal Norwegian Navy) off Averøya, Norway.
Yu 2	Imperial Japanese Army	World War II: The Type 3 submergence transport vehicle was sunk by United States Navy destroyers in Philippines waters.

== 29 November ==
List of shipwrecks: 29 November 1944
Ship	State	Description
CH-45	Imperial Japanese Navy	World War II: Convoy TA-6: The CH-28-class submarine chaser was sunk east of Cebu, Philippines (10°25′N 124°00′E) by Republic P-47 Thunderbolt aircraft of the 460th Fighter Squadron, United States Fifth Air Force.
Daiboshi Maru No. 6	Imperial Japanese Army	World War II: The Daiboshi Maru No. 6-class transport ship (a.k.a. Taisei Maru No. 6) was torpedoed and sunk in the Yellow Sea south of Inchon, off the west coast of Chosen (37°17′N 125°11′E) by USS Spadefish (United States Navy) with the loss of 46 lives.
Fushimi	Imperial Japanese Navy	World War II: The Fushimi-class gunboat was bombed and sunk in the Yangtze near Anking, China by Chinese Air Force aircraft. She was refloated and towed to Shanghai. Stripped of armament and not returned to service. She was given to the Republic of China as a War Reparation by the Allies post war.
HMS MMS 101	Royal Navy	World War II: The MMS-class minesweeper (255/295 t, 1943) was sunk by a mine in the Aegean Sea off Thessaloniki, Greece. 15 crewmen were killed.
Max Bornhofen	Germany	World War II: The transport struck a mine and sank in the Baltic Sea.
Shinano	Imperial Japanese Navy	World War II: The aircraft carrier, a converted Yamato-class battleship, was torpedoed and sunk in the Pacific Ocean 110 nautical miles (200 km) north west of Omaezaki Lighthouse (33°07′N 137°04′E) by USS Archerfish (United States Navy) with the loss of 1,436 crew and 6 Shin'yō-class suicide motorboats. One thousand and eighty survivors were rescued by Yukikaze (Imperial Japanese Navy).
Shinsho Maru	Japan	World War II: Convoy TA-6: The cargo ship was bombed by North American B-25 Mitchell aircraft of the United States Fifth Air Force and Republic P-47 Thunderbolt aircraft of the 460th Fighter Squadron, United States Fifth Air Force. She was beached on the west coast of Leyte.

== 30 November ==
List of shipwrecks: 30 November 1944
Ship	State	Description
Bever	South African Navy	World War II: The auxiliary minesweeping whaler (252 GRT, 1930) struck a mine and sank at Piraeus, Greece.
Dairen Maru	Imperial Japanese Army	World War II: The Dairen Maru-class auxiliary transport (3,748 GRT, 1925) was torpedoed and sunk in the Yellow Sea off Inchon, Korea (38°08′N 124°05′E) by USS Sunfish (United States Navy). 7 passengers, 7 gunners, and 12 crew killed.
HMS Duff	Royal Navy	World War II: The Captain-class frigate (1,432/1,823 t, 1943) struck a mine in the North Sea off Ostend, West Flanders, Belgium and was severely damaged. She was declared a constructive total loss.
Empire Ness	United Kingdom	The ore carrier (2,922 GRT, 1941) collided with William Paca (United States) in the North Sea off Terneuzen, Zeeland, Netherlands and sank.
M 584	Kriegsmarine	World War II: The Type 1916 minesweeper struck a mine and sank in the Kattegat.
Shinetsu Maru	Japan	World War II: Convoy TA-6: The cargo ship was bombed and sunk north of Cebu, Philippines by American aircraft.
SS 5	Imperial Japanese Navy	World War II: The SS-class landing ship was sunk by US aircraft near Masbate.
Unknown barge	Imperial Japanese Navy	Convoy 3129: The Daihatsu landing barge washed overboard from Yaei Maru (Japan) and was lost in heavy seas.
V 5514 Hornisse	Kriegsmarine	The naval trawler/Vorpostenboot was lost on this date.
V 5527	Kriegsmarine	The KFK 2-class naval drifter/Vorpostenboot was wrecked on this date.

== Unknown date ==
List of shipwrecks: Unknown date 1944
Ship	State	Description
General Maican	Royal Romanian Navy	The auxiliary patrol ship was lost sometime in November.
HMS LCT 2461	Royal Navy	The LCT-5-class landing craft tank (134/286 t, 1942) was lost in the Bay of Bengal.
Mogador	French Navy	World War II: The hulk of the Mogador-class destroyer – which had been scuttled on 27 November 1942 to avoid capture by the Germans and then refloated by the Italians in 1943 – was sunk by Allied bombers in late 1944. The wreck was raised and scrapped in 1949.
R-215	Kriegsmarine	The Type R-151 minesweeper was wrecked in the Mediterranean Sea during November.
S-603	Kriegsmarine	World War II: The MAS 423-class MAS boat was sunk in the Adriatic Sea between Šibenik and Zadar, Yugoslavia by Royal Navy ships sometime in November.
Saar	Germany	World War II: The fishing trawler struck a mine and sank in the Baltic Sea between 24 and 29 November.
Solling	Germany	World War II: The fishing trawler struck a mine and sank in the Baltic Sea between 24 and 29 November.
U-479	Kriegsmarine	World War II: The Type VIIC submarine was sunk by mine while on patrol in the Gulf of Finland on or after 15 November with the loss of all 51 crew. Wreck found confirming mining.
