= HMCS Algonquin (R17) =

Destroyer of the Royal Canadian Navy

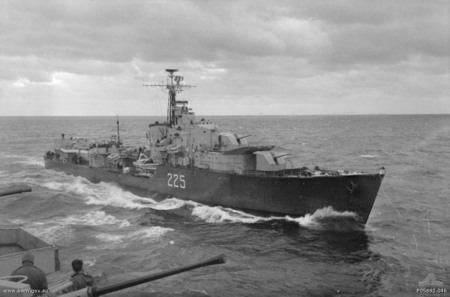
- Sister ship HMCS Sioux in the 1950s

History

Canada
- Name: Algonquin
- Builder: John Brown & Company, Clydebank
- Yard number: 602
- Laid down: 8 October 1942
- Launched: 2 September 1943
- Commissioned: 28 February 1944
- Out of service: 6 February 1946
- Refit: 1954
- Identification: Pennant number: R17 Later DDE 224
- Motto: A coup sur; ("With sure stroke")
- Honours and awards: Norway, 1944; Normandy, 1944; Arctic, 1944–1945
- Fate: Scrapped April 1971
- Badge: Blazon Sable, a base barry wavy argent and azure of four, from which issues an Indian's arm embowed proper wearing arm and wrist bands argent and holding a fish spear in bend argent transfixing an eel Or

General characteristics (as built)
- Class & type: V-class destroyer
- Displacement: 2,700 long tons (2,743 t)
- Length: 362 ft 9 in (110.57 m)
- Beam: 35 ft 8 in (10.87 m)
- Draught: 10 ft (3.0 m)
- Propulsion: 2 × Admiralty 3-drum boilers; 2-shaft Parsons geared turbines; 40,000 shp (29,828 kW)
- Speed: 31 knots (57 km/h; 36 mph)
- Range: 4,860 nmi (9,000 km) at 20 kn (37 km/h)
- Complement: 250
- Sensors & processing systems: HF/DF; Radar 272, later Radar 276; Mark 63 fire-control system
- Armament: 4 × 4.7 in (119 mm) QF Mk IX guns (4×1); 2 × 40 mm Mk IV guns; 4 × 20 mm cannons (4×1); 8 × 21 inch (533 mm) torpedo tubes (2×4)

HMCS Algonquin was a V-class destroyer, laid down for the Royal Navy as HMS Valentine (R17) and transferred to the Royal Canadian Navy on completion during the Second World War. She saw service in the Second World War escorting the aircraft carriers that bombed the Tirpitz in March 1944 and providing naval gunfire support to the Normandy landings. The destroyer was to participate in the Pacific Campaign but the war ended before her arrival in that theatre. Algonquin was converted in 1953 to a frigate and spent the majority of her remaining career in the Atlantic, being paid off in 1970.

== Service history ==
Ordered as Kempenfelt by the Royal Navy, the destroyer's keel was laid down on 8 October 1942. The ship's name was changed to Valentine in 1942. The destroyer was launched on 2 September 1943. Valentine was renamed Algonquin and commissioned into the Royal Canadian Navy on 28 February 1944. (Note: Macpherson and Barrie give two commissioning dates for Algonquin; 7 and 17 February.)

Following her commissioning, Algonquin was sent to Scapa Flow to work up with her sister Sioux. They were then assigned to the British Home Fleet's 26th Destroyer Flotilla. Departing on 29 March 1944 from Scapa Flow, the flotilla joined the escort screen on 31 March for the force sent to cover the Russian convoy JW 58. On 3 April they join the fleet sent to bomb the German battleship Tirpitz in Operation Tungsten. On 26 April Algonquin escorted a strike force hunting for German ships near the Norwegian Lofoten Islands. On 6 May, Algonquin deployed as part of a force comprising two aircraft carriers and five other destroyers. Aircraft from the carriers attacked two German convoys and sank two ships for the loss of two aircraft. Algonquin and the 26th Destroyer Flotilla began training for Operation Neptune, the naval component of the Normandy invasion. The flotilla departed Scapa Flow on 28 May for Portsmouth. Algonquin and sister Sioux provided gunfire support to the landings on Juno Beach.

=== Invasion of Normandy ===
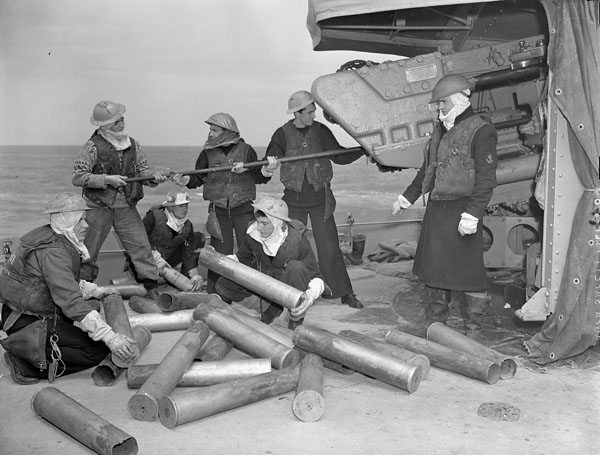
Algonquin's 4.7-inch gun crew during the Invasion of Normandy.

On 6 June 1944, Algonquin left the Solent at 06:45am as part of the assault fleet for Juno Beach, the Canadian sector of the invasion. After arrival, Algonquin began performing her gunfire support mission, firing at her first target; a pair of 75 mm (3 in) guns located behind houses west of Saint-Aubin-sur-Mer. Following their destruction, Algonquin shifted to destroying houses harbouring snipers along the Nan Red sector. By mid-morning, Algonquin fired only intermittently and the destroyer's gunfire was controlled from shore-based army observers. Around 10:00am, Algonquin was called upon to take out a battery of three 88 mm (3 in) guns 3.2 kilometres (2 mi) inland from Courselles. The destroyer spent the rest of the time with the invasion fleet on D-day moving around and coming under air attack.

On 7 June, the ship shelled a series of houses that was being used by snipers. Algonquin, with Sioux was used on Guards Patrol around the anchorage. On 10 June, the destroyer shuttled Vice-Admiral Percy W. Nelles to Normandy and followed this up on 18 June by ferrying General Harry Crerar, commander of Canadian invasion forces, and his staff to France. The following day, the ship performed a fire support mission for an attack by Royal Marines between Ouistreham and Cabourg. On 24 June, Algonquin, with Sioux, shelled a German battery near Franceville before departing for Scapa Flow.

=== Northern operations ===
After returning from invasion duties, Algonquin was made part of the destroyer force for the Home Fleet again. From 9–11 August 1944, Algonquin and Sioux are among the escorts for a carrier force sent to attack German airfields at Gossen, Norway and disrupt German shipping in the Lepsoyren Channel and Harhanesfjord. The Home Fleet departed on 16 August to carry out attacks, named Operation Goodwood, on Tirpitz lying at Kaafjord, splitting into two groups. Algonquin and Sioux were part of the force under the command of Rear-Admiral Rhoderick McGrigor. The escort carrier HMS Nabob was part of the task force, manned by a Canadian crew. The escort carrier was torpedoed by a U-boat on 22 August, suffering significant damage. Algonquin was dispatched to aid the damaged ship arriving on 23 August, taking 203 members of the crew off. The destroyer later transferred the Nabob personnel to another ship and returned to fleet off Norway.

On 11 September, Algonquin formed part of the screening force for another strike against German shipping off Norway. Upon returning from this mission, the destroyer escorted convoys to Murmansk and back. Only two ships were torpedoed, both on the trip back to the United Kingdom. Algonquin escorted a British force from 14–15 October sent to perform air-mining and attacks on Axis shipping routes along the coast of Norway near Frohavet. From 26–28 October, Algonquin is among the escort for the aircraft carrier HMS Implacable during attacks on Norway as part of Operation Athletic.

During the night of 12/13 November, Algonquin deployed as part of Operation Counterblast, with the cruisers HMS Kent and Bellona and the destroyers Myngs, Verulam and Zambesi were deployed based on "Ultra" intelligence and attacked the German convoy KS 357 between Listerfjord and Egersund. The freighters Greif and Cornouailles were sunk, as were the minesweepers M 427 and M 416 and the submarine chasers UJ 1221, UJ 1223 and UJ 1713. Algonquin took part in the sinking of the three submarine chasers and one merchant vessel. On 22 November, Algonquin was part of the screen for airstrikes on Norway. On 27 November Algonquin was among the escorts for Implacable during raids on German shipping along the coast of Norway. The destroyer returned to the region for more airstrikes on 6 December. From 7–14 December, the ship escorted a British carrier force in support of Operation "Urbane" for the convoy RA 62 off the coast of Norway.

On 30 December, Algonquin sailed with the Murmansk-bound convoy JW 63 from Loch Ewe, Scotland to Kola Inlet, Russia, arriving on 8 January 1945. The destroyer returned with RW 63, departing Kola Inlet on 11 January. RW 63 comprised 29 ships. During the return trip, the convoy was scattered by a storm in which gale winds reached 85 knots (157 km/h; 98 mph) which delayed its arrival at Loch Ewe until 21 January. The destroyer returned to Norwegian waters escorting more airstrikes in January 1945. In February, Algonquin and Sioux sailed to the Minch to meet Puncher, the second Canadian-manned escort carrier, after which Algonquin sailed for Canada on 5 February.

Algonquin arrived in Canada in February 1945 for a tropicalization refit at Halifax, Nova Scotia. Work was complete by August when she departed to join the British Pacific Fleet, though she did not arrive by the war's end, being in the Eastern Mediterranean on VJ-day. Following a brief stop at Alexandria, Egypt she crossed the Indian and Pacific Oceans to her homeport at Esquimalt, British Columbia. The destroyer was paid off into reserve and laid up on 6 February 1946.

=== Cold War service ===
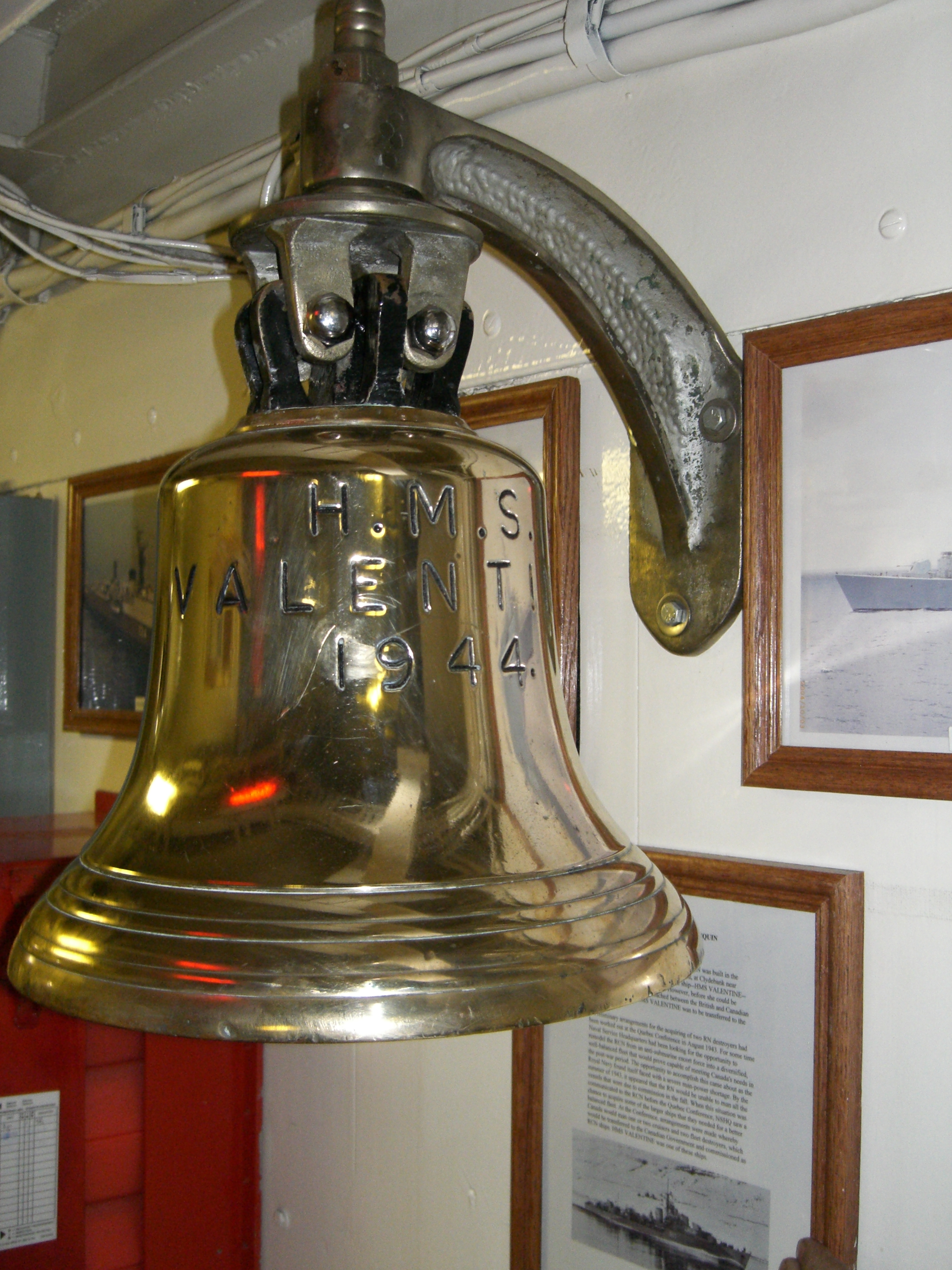
Valentine's bell aboard the Iroquois-class destroyer Algonquin

Algonquin was modernized to a Type 15 frigate at Esquimalt and recommissioned on 25 February 1953 with the hull number 224. She was not selected for duty in the Korean War and was instead posted to CFB Halifax on the North Atlantic coast where she spent much of the next 14 years working with Canada's NATO allies. The First Canadian Escort Squadron came into being on 10 November 1953 as part of Atlantic Command with Algonquin as its flagship. The squadron was initially composed of Algonquin and the Prestonian-class frigates Lauzon, Prestonian and Toronto. In September the First Canadian Escort Squadron took part in the NATO naval exercise "New Broom II" and in October "Morning Mist" before performing a two-month training cruise in the Mediterranean Sea, making several port visits. The squadron returned to Canada on 10 December 1954. In January 1958, Algonquin collided with HMCS Nootka while operating in the Atlantic with the First Canadian Escort Squadron.

Algonquin returned to Esquimalt in 1967 and was paid off on 1 April 1970. She was sold for scrap and broken up in Taiwan in 1971.
