= SS Godafoss =

History

Iceland
- Name: Godafoss
- Owner: Eimskipafelag Hf.
- Port of registry: Reykjavík, Iceland
- Builder: Frederikshavns Vaerft & Flydedok A/S
- Completed: 1921
- Maiden voyage: 1921
- In service: 1921
- Fate: Torpedoed and sunk 10 November 1944

General characteristics
- Type: Cargo ship
- Tonnage: 1,542 GRT
- Length: 72.2 m (236 ft 11 in)
- Beam: 11 m (36 ft 1 in)
- Depth: 6.4 m (21 ft 0 in)
- Installed power: Compound expansion engine
- Propulsion: Screw propeller
- Speed: 10 knots (19 km/h; 12 mph)
- Capacity: 44 passengers and crew

SS Godafoss (Icelandic: E/S Goðafoss) was an Icelandic cargo ship that was torpedoed by the German submarine U-300 just off Reykjanes 4 nautical miles (7.4 km) northwest of Gardur, Iceland (64°08′N 22°45′W), while she was travelling from New York, United States to Reykjavík, Iceland.

== Construction ==
Godafoss was constructed in 1921 at the Frederikshavns Vaerft & Flydedok A/S shipyard in Frederikshavn, Denmark. Godafoss served in the Eimskipafelagid fleet from July 1921 until her demise in November 1944. The ship was 72.2 metres (236 ft 11 in) long, with a beam of 11 metres (36 ft 1 in) and a depth of 6.4 metres (21 ft 0 in). The ship was assessed at 1,564 gross register tons (GRT). She had a Compound expansion engine driving a single screw propeller and the engine was rated at 124 nhp.

== Sinking ==
On 10 November 1944, Godafoss was on a voyage in Convoy UR 142 from New York, United States to Reykjavík, Iceland with a general cargo of 1,240 tons. The convoy in which Godafoss was the lead ship had broken up during the night due to foul weather. Godafoss had stopped to help rescue survivors from the burning vessel Shirvan when she was torpedoed with an LUT torpedo from the German submarine U-300. The vessel sank within seven minutes; 14 crew members, one convoy signalman and ten passengers were lost. Survivors were rescued by HNoMS Honningsvåg and R. N. Naval trawler HMT Northern Reward.

== Wreck ==
The wreck lies at 64°08′N 22°45′W.
