= HMS Stratagem =

S-class submarine of the Royal Navy

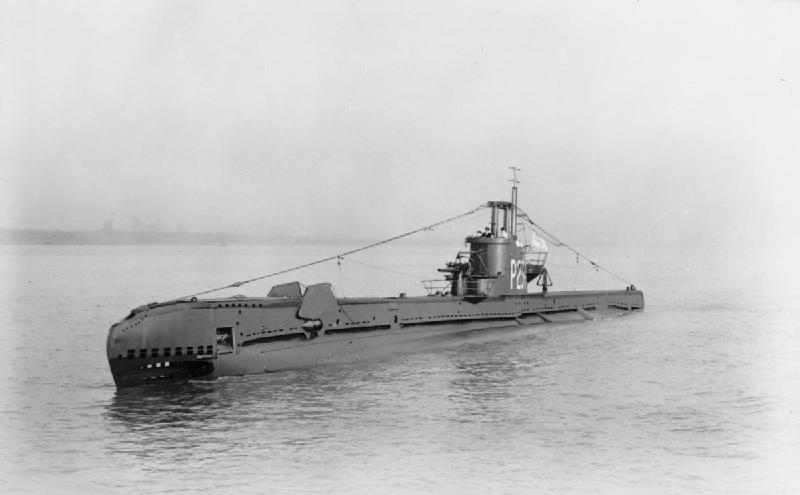
- Stratagem under way on the River Mersey

History

United Kingdom
- Name: Stratagem
- Ordered: 3 August 1941
- Builder: Cammell Laird, Birkenhead
- Laid down: 15 April 1942
- Launched: 21 June 1943
- Commissioned: 9 October 1943
- Identification: Pennant number: P234
- Fate: Sunk, 22 November 1944
- Badge

General characteristics
- Class & type: S-class submarine
- Displacement: 865 long tons (879 t) (surfaced); 990 long tons (1,010 t) (submerged)
- Length: 217 ft (66.1 m)
- Beam: 23 ft 9 in (7.2 m)
- Draught: 14 ft 8 in (4.5 m)
- Installed power: 1,900 bhp (1,400 kW) (diesel); 1,300 hp (970 kW) (electric)
- Propulsion: 2 × diesel engines; 2 × electric motors
- Speed: 15 kn (28 km/h; 17 mph) (surfaced); 10 kn (19 km/h; 12 mph) (submerged)
- Range: 6,000 nmi (11,000 km; 6,900 mi) at 10 knots (19 km/h; 12 mph) (surfaced); 120 nmi (220 km; 140 mi) at 3 knots (5.6 km/h; 3.5 mph)
- Test depth: 300 ft (91.4 m) (submerged)
- Complement: 48
- Sensors & processing systems: Type 129AR or 138 ASDIC; Type 291 early-warning radar
- Armament: 7 × 21 in (533 mm) torpedo tubes (6 × bow, 1 × stern); 1 × 3 in (76 mm) deck gun; 1 × 20 mm (0.8 in) AA gun

HMS Stratagem was a third-batch S-class submarine built for the Royal Navy during World War II. Completed in 1943, she made her first war patrol off Norway before she was sent to the Far East, where she conducted three war patrols. On her second, she shelled installations on a Japanese-held island. Her only success came on her last patrol, when she torpedoed and sank a Japanese oil tanker. Soon after, she was spotted by aircraft and depth charged by a destroyer. She was forced to surface, and was scuttled to prevent her capture. Ten crew members escaped the sinking submarine and were taken prisoner, of whom only three survived the war.

== Design and description ==
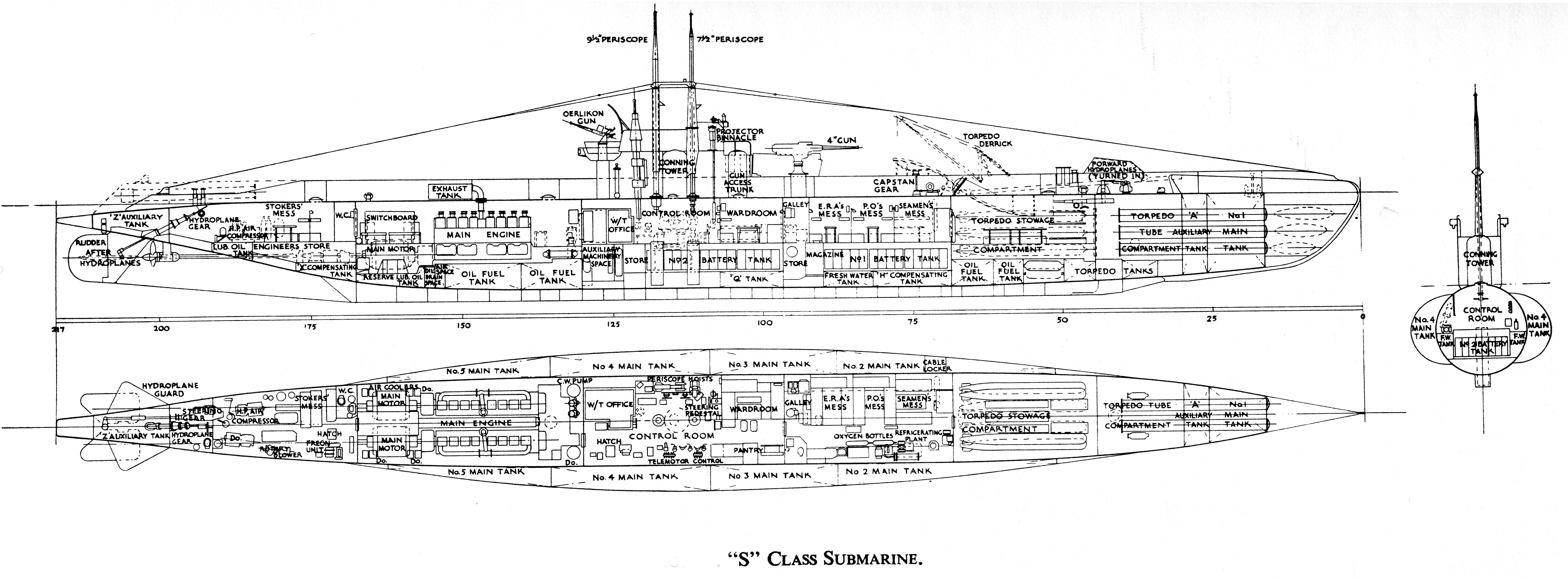
Schematic drawing of a S-class submarine

The S-class submarines were designed to patrol the restricted waters of the North Sea and the Mediterranean Sea. The third batch was slightly enlarged and improved over the preceding second batch of the S class. The submarines had a length of 217 feet (66.1 m) overall, a beam of 23 feet 9 inches (7.2 m) and a draught of 14 feet 8 inches (4.5 m). They displaced 865 long tons (879 t) on the surface and 990 long tons (1,010 t) submerged. The S-class submarines had a crew of 48 officers and ratings. They had a diving depth of 300 feet (91 m).

For surface running, the boats were powered by two 950-brake-horsepower (708 kW) diesel engines, each driving one propeller shaft. When submerged each propeller was driven by a 650-horsepower (485 kW) electric motor. They could reach 15 knots (28 km/h; 17 mph) on the surface and 10 knots (19 km/h; 12 mph) underwater. On the surface, the third batch boats had a range of 6,000 nautical miles (11,000 km; 6,900 mi) at 10 knots (19 km/h; 12 mph) and 120 nmi (220 km; 140 mi) at 3 knots (5.6 km/h; 3.5 mph) submerged.

The boats were armed with seven 21-inch (533 mm) torpedo tubes. A half-dozen of these were in the bow, and one external tube was mounted in the stern. They carried six reload torpedoes for the bow tubes for a grand total of thirteen torpedoes. Twelve mines could be carried in lieu of the internally stowed torpedoes. They were also armed with a 3-inch (76 mm) deck gun. It is uncertain if Stratagem was completed with a 20-millimetre (0.8 in) Oerlikon light AA gun or had one added later. The third-batch S-class boats were fitted with either a Type 129AR or 138 ASDIC system and a Type 291 or 291W early-warning radar.

== Construction and career ==
HMS Stratagem was a third-group S-class submarine and was ordered as part of the 1941 Naval Programme on 3 August 1941. She was laid down in the Cammell Laird shipyard in Birkenhead on 15 April 1942 and launched on 21 June 1943. On 24 September 1943, Stratagem sailed to Holy Loch, where she was commissioned into the Royal Navy on 9 October. Stratagem has so far been the only Royal Navy ship with this name.

After training in several port areas, the boat departed Lerwick for a work-up patrol off Norway on 3 January 1944. She returned less than two weeks later without having sighted any enemy ships.

Stratagem then had her battery changed at Sheerness on 23 January. The boat conducted additional training exercises until 3 March, when she was sent south to Gibraltar, and arrived on 14 April. The submarine was now commanded by Lt. C. R. Pelly. (Note: Full name: Clifford Raymond Pelly) Along with HMS Sickle and HMS Spirit, Stratagem sailed to Malta in convoy USG 38 and then continued independently to Port Said before transiting the Suez Canal with a stop at Aden and finally arriving at Trincomalee, Ceylon, on 27 May.

=== Far East ===
Stratagem's first war patrol in the Far East started on 27 June 1944, when she departed Trincomalee to operate off the Andaman Islands. On 1 July, she fired four torpedoes at a Japanese merchant ship off Port Blair, but missed. On 2 July, she again unsuccessfully attacked another Japanese ship, as none of her six torpedoes hit their target. Two days later, the boat attacked the same merchant with her two remaining torpedoes and claimed a hit, but Japanese records do not mention a loss on this date. Having expended all her torpedoes, the submarine returned to port on 7 July.

On 31 July, Stratagem departed Trincomalee for another patrol west of Siam. She returned to port on 22 August without having sighted any potential targets. From 16 September to 5 October, the boat conducted another patrol in the same area but only shelled warehouses and buildings on Great Coco Island and did not attack enemy ships.

=== Loss ===
Stratagem departed Trincomalee for the last time on 10 November 1944, with orders to patrol in the Strait of Malacca. Nine days later, she torpedoed and sank the Japanese tanker Nichinan Maru in the Strait, the only victory in her career. On 22 November 1944, the submarine was detected by aircraft and attacked with depth charges by the Japanese submarine chaser CH 35. The first depth charge caused Stratagem's bow to hit the sea bottom and caused flooding. The forward watertight bulkhead could not be closed, and she was forced to surface. The submarine was scuttled, and ten of her crew were taken prisoner, of whom only three survived the war.

== Summary of raiding history ==
During her service with the Royal Navy, Stratagem sank one Japanese ship of 1,945 GRT.

Date	Name of ship	Tonnage	Nationality	Fate and location
19 November 1944	Nichinan Maru	1,945	Empire of Japan	Torpedoed and sunk at 01°36′N 102°53′E
