= German submarine U-978 =

German World War II submarine

History

Nazi Germany
- Name: U-978
- Ordered: 5 June 1941
- Builder: Blohm & Voss, Hamburg
- Yard number: 178
- Laid down: 24 July 1942
- Launched: 1 April 1943
- Commissioned: 12 May 1943
- Fate: Surrendered on 9 May 1945; sunk as part of Operation Deadlight on 11 December 1945

General characteristics
- Class & type: Type VIIC submarine
- Displacement: 769 tonnes (757 long tons) surfaced; 871 t (857 long tons) submerged
- Length: 67.10 m (220 ft 2 in) o/a; 50.50 m (165 ft 8 in) pressure hull
- Beam: 6.20 m (20 ft 4 in) o/a; 4.70 m (15 ft 5 in) pressure hull
- Height: 9.60 m (31 ft 6 in)
- Draught: 4.74 m (15 ft 7 in)
- Installed power: 2,800–3,200 PS (2,100–2,400 kW; 2,800–3,200 bhp) (diesels); 750 PS (550 kW; 740 shp) (electric)
- Propulsion: 2 shafts; 2 × diesel engines; 2 × electric motors
- Speed: 17.7 knots (32.8 km/h; 20.4 mph) surfaced; 7.6 knots (14.1 km/h; 8.7 mph) submerged
- Range: 8,500 nmi (15,700 km; 9,800 mi) at 10 knots (19 km/h; 12 mph) surfaced; 80 nmi (150 km; 92 mi) at 4 knots (7.4 km/h; 4.6 mph) submerged
- Test depth: 230 m (750 ft); Crush depth: 250–295 m (820–968 ft)
- Complement: 4 officers, 40–56 enlisted
- Armament: 5 × 53.3 cm (21 in) torpedo tubes (four bow, one stern); 14 × torpedoes or 26 TMA mines; 1 × 8.8 cm (3.46 in) deck gun (220 rounds); 1 × twin 2 cm (0.79 in) C/30 anti-aircraft gun

Service record
- Part of: 5th U-boat Flotilla; 12 May 1943 – 31 July 1944; 3rd U-boat Flotilla; 1 August – 4 September 1944; 11th U-boat Flotilla; 5 September 1944 – 8 May 1945
- Identification codes: M 51 997
- Commanders: Oblt.z.S. / Kptlt. Günther Pulst; 12 May 1943 – 9 May 1945
- Operations: 2 patrols: 1st patrol: 9 October – 16 December 1944; 2nd patrol: 25 February – 20 April 1945
- Victories: 1 merchant ship total loss (7,176 GRT)

German submarine U-978 was a World War II Type VIIC U-boat operated by Nazi Germany's Kriegsmarine . She completed the longest underwater patrol of World War II.

== Design ==
German Type VIIC submarines were preceded by the shorter Type VIIB submarines. U-978 had a displacement of 769 tonnes (757 long tons) when at the surface and 871 tonnes (857 long tons) while submerged. She had a total length of 67.10 m (220 ft 2 in), a pressure hull length of 50.50 m (165 ft 8 in), a beam of 6.20 m (20 ft 4 in), a height of 9.60 m (31 ft 6 in), and a draught of 4.74 m (15 ft 7 in). The submarine was powered by two Germaniawerft F46 four-stroke, six-cylinder supercharged diesel engines producing a total of 2,800 to 3,200 metric horsepower (2,060 to 2,350 kW; 2,760 to 3,160 shp) for use while surfaced, two Brown, Boveri & Cie GG UB 720/8 double-acting electric motors producing a total of 750 metric horsepower (550 kW; 740 shp) for use while submerged. She had two shafts and two 1.23 m (4 ft) propellers. The boat was capable of operating at depths of up to 230 metres (750 ft).

The submarine had a maximum surface speed of 17.7 knots (32.8 km/h; 20.4 mph) and a maximum submerged speed of 7.6 knots (14.1 km/h; 8.7 mph). When submerged, the boat could operate for 80 nautical miles (150 km; 92 mi) at 4 knots (7.4 km/h; 4.6 mph); when surfaced, she could travel 8,500 nautical miles (15,700 km; 9,800 mi) at 10 knots (19 km/h; 12 mph). U-978 was fitted with five 53.3 cm (21 in) torpedo tubes (four fitted at the bow and one at the stern), fourteen torpedoes, one 8.8 cm (3.46 in) SK C/35 naval gun, 220 rounds, and one twin 2 cm (0.79 in) C/30 anti-aircraft gun. The boat had a complement of between forty-four and sixty.

== Service history ==
U-978 was commissioned on 12 May 1943 and assigned to 5th U-boat Flotilla for crew training. On 1 August 1944, U-978 was assigned to 3rd U-boat Flotilla for operational service, and completed one patrol with that unit. On 4 September 1944 she was ordered to 11th U-boat Flotilla, beginning service on 5 September. During her second war patrol, U-978 completed the longest underwater Schnorchel patrol of World War II, lasting 68 days, under command of Guenther Pulst. The record-breaking patrol began on 9 October 1944 when she left Bergen, Norway and ended on 16 December when she returned to Bergen from her patrol. This was two days longer than the famed underwater journey of U-977 to Argentina, shortly after Germany's surrender. During her two patrols U-978, did not sink any ships, but damaged one ship beyond repair, which measured 7,176 GRT.

== Fate ==
U-978 survived the war as did her whole crew, and was surrendered at Trondheim on 9 May 1945. She was sunk on 11 December 1945 during Operation Deadlight by torpedoes at location 55°50′N 10°05′W.

== Summary of raiding history ==
Date	Ship Name	Nationality	Tonnage (GRT)	Fate
23 November 1944	William D. Burnham	United States	7,176	Total loss

== Bibliography ==
- Busch, Rainer; Röll, Hans-Joachim (1999). German U-boat commanders of World War II : a biographical dictionary. Translated by Brooks, Geoffrey. London, Annapolis, Md: Greenhill Books, Naval Institute Press. ISBN 1-55750-186-6.
- Busch, Rainer; Röll, Hans-Joachim (1999). Der U-Boot-Krieg, 1939-1945: Deutsche U-Boot-Verluste von September 1939 bis Mai 1945 [German U-boat losses from September 1939 to May 1945] (in German). Vol. IV. Hamburg, Berlin, Bonn: Mittler. ISBN 3-8132-0514-2.
- Gröner, Erich; Jung, Dieter; Maass, Martin (1991). U-boats and Mine Warfare Vessels. German Warships 1815–1945. Vol. 2. Translated by Thomas, Keith; Magowan, Rachel. London: Conway Maritime Press. ISBN 0-85177-593-4.
- Bishop, C. Kriegsmarine U-Boats 1939 –45. Amber Books, 2006.
