= German submarine U-300 =

German World War II submarine

History

Nazi Germany
- Name: U-300
- Ordered: 23 March 1942
- Builder: Bremer Vulkan, Bremen-Vegesack
- Yard number: 65
- Laid down: 9 April 1943
- Launched: 23 November 1943
- Commissioned: 29 December 1943
- Fate: Sunk on 22 February 1945

General characteristics
- Class & type: Type VIIC/41 submarine
- Displacement: 759 tonnes (747 long tons) surfaced; 860 t (846 long tons) submerged
- Length: 67.10 m (220 ft 2 in) o/a; 50.50 m (165 ft 8 in) pressure hull
- Beam: 6.20 m (20 ft 4 in) o/a; 4.70 m (15 ft 5 in) pressure hull
- Height: 9.60 m (31 ft 6 in)
- Draught: 4.74 m (15 ft 7 in)
- Installed power: 2,800–3,200 PS (2,100–2,400 kW; 2,800–3,200 bhp) (diesels); 750 PS (550 kW; 740 shp) (electric)
- Propulsion: 2 shafts; 2 × diesel engines; 2 × electric motors
- Speed: 17.7 knots (32.8 km/h; 20.4 mph) surfaced; 7.6 knots (14.1 km/h; 8.7 mph) submerged
- Range: 8,500 nmi (15,700 km; 9,800 mi) at 10 knots (19 km/h; 12 mph) surfaced; 80 nmi (150 km; 92 mi) at 4 knots (7.4 km/h; 4.6 mph) submerged
- Test depth: 250 m (820 ft); Crush depth: 275–325 m (902–1,066 ft)
- Complement: 4 officers, 40–56 enlisted
- Armament: 5 × 53.3 cm (21 in) torpedo tubes (four bow, one stern); 14 × torpedoes; 1 × 8.8 cm (3.46 in) deck gun (220 rounds); 1 × 3.7 cm (1.5 in) Flak M42 AA gun; 2 × 2 cm (0.79 in) C/30 AA guns

Service record
- Part of: 8th U-boat Flotilla; 29 December 1943 – 31 July 1944; 7th U-boat Flotilla; 1 August – 30 September 1944; 11th U-boat Flotilla; 1 October 1944 – 22 February 1945
- Identification codes: M 05 631
- Commanders: Oblt.z.S. Fritz Hein; 29 December 1943 – 22 February 1945
- Operations: 3 patrols: 1st patrol: 18 July – 17 August 1944; 2nd patrol: 4 October – 2 December 1944; 3rd patrol: 21 January – 22 February 1945
- Victories: 2 merchant ships sunk (7,559 GRT); 1 merchant ship total loss (9,551 GRT); 1 merchant ship damaged (7,176 GRT)

German submarine U-300 was a Type VIIC/41 U-boat of Nazi Germany's Kriegsmarine during World War II.

The submarine was laid down on 9 April 1943 by the Bremer Vulkan yard at Bremen-Vegesack as yard number 65. She was launched on 23 November 1943, and commissioned on 29 December 1943 under the command of Oberleutnant zur See Fritz Hein. U-300 served with the 8th U-boat Flotilla for training, the 7th U-boat Flotilla from 1 August 1944 to 30 September 1944 and the 11th U-boat Flotilla from 1 October 1944 to 22 February 1945 for operations. She carried out three patrols, sinking two ships, and damaged two more before she was sunk on 22 February 1945 off Quarteira, Portugal.

== Design ==
German Type VIIC/41 submarines were preceded by the heavier Type VIIC submarines. U-300 had a displacement of 759 tonnes (747 long tons) when at the surface and 860 tonnes (850 long tons) while submerged. She had a total length of 67.10 m (220 ft 2 in), a pressure hull length of 50.50 m (165 ft 8 in), a beam of 6.20 m (20 ft 4 in), a height of 9.60 m (31 ft 6 in), and a draught of 4.74 m (15 ft 7 in). The submarine was powered by two Germaniawerft F46 four-stroke, six-cylinder supercharged diesel engines producing a total of 2,800 to 3,200 metric horsepower (2,060 to 2,350 kW; 2,760 to 3,160 shp) for use while surfaced, two AEG GU 460/8–27 double-acting electric motors producing a total of 750 metric horsepower (550 kW; 740 shp) for use while submerged. She had two shafts and two 1.23 m (4 ft) propellers. The boat was capable of operating at depths of up to 230 metres (750 ft).

The submarine had a maximum surface speed of 17.7 knots (32.8 km/h; 20.4 mph) and a maximum submerged speed of 7.6 knots (14.1 km/h; 8.7 mph). When submerged, the boat could operate for 80 nautical miles (150 km; 92 mi) at 4 knots (7.4 km/h; 4.6 mph); when surfaced, she could travel 8,500 nautical miles (15,700 km; 9,800 mi) at 10 knots (19 km/h; 12 mph). U-300 was fitted with five 53.3 cm (21 in) torpedo tubes (four fitted at the bow and one at the stern), fourteen torpedoes, one 8.8 cm (3.46 in) SK C/35 naval gun, (220 rounds), one 3.7 cm (1.5 in) Flak M42 and two 2 cm (0.79 in) C/30 anti-aircraft guns. The boat had a complement of between forty-four and sixty.

== Service history ==
=== First patrol ===
U-300 departed Horten Naval Base, Norway, on 18 July 1944 and sailed for the waters south-east of Iceland. On 4 August the U-boat was attacked by a Canso flying boat of No. 162 Squadron RCAF with three depth charges, causing extensive damage. The U-boat drove the aircraft off with flak, but was forced to return to base for repairs, arriving at Trondheim on 17 August.

=== Second patrol ===
The U-boat left Trondheim on 4 October 1944 for another patrol south of Iceland. On 10 November she sank two ships from convoy UR-142 en route from the UK to Reykjavík in Iceland.

She hit the British 6,017 GRT tanker Shirvan setting her on fire, and when the Icelandic 1,542 GRT cargo ship Godafoss stopped, against orders, to pick up survivors from the tanker, she was also torpedoed, and sank within seven minutes with the loss of 24 lives, including four young children. The abandoned Shirvan foundered the next day.

U-300 returned to Stavanger, Norway on 2 December.

=== Third patrol ===
U-300 sailed from Stavanger on 21 January 1945 on her third and final patrol to the Atlantic waters off Spain. There on 17 February, 27 miles from Gibraltar, she attacked Convoy UGS-72, firing two spreads of two torpedoes, hitting the American 7,176 GRT Liberty ship Michael J. Stone and the British 9,551 GRT tanker Regent Lion.

The Michael J. Stone was flooded in both holds and the steering room. However, she managed to reach Gibraltar under her own power where she was dry-docked and repaired. The Regent Lion, which had already been damaged by a torpedo from another U-boat the previous day, had to be taken in tow. She was grounded on Perl Rock, a mile south of Carnero Point in the Bay of Gibraltar, and was later declared a total loss.

=== Sinking ===
U-300 was sunk on 22 February 1945 in the North Atlantic south of Quarteira, in position 36°29′N 08°20′W, by gunfire from the British Algerine-class minesweepers HMS Recruit and HMS Pincher, after being badly damaged by depth charges from the British armed yacht HMS Evadne on 19 February. Nine of the crew were lost, there were 41 survivors.

== Summary of raiding history ==
Date	Ship Name	Nationality	Tonnage (GRT)	Fate
10 November 1944	Godafoss	Iceland	1,542	Sunk
10 November 1944	Shirvan	United Kingdom	6,017	Sunk
17 February 1945	Michael J. Stone	United States	7,176	Damaged
17 February 1945	Regent Lion	United Kingdom	9,551	Total loss

== Bibliography ==
- Busch, Rainer; Röll, Hans-Joachim (1999). German U-boat commanders of World War II : a biographical dictionary. Translated by Brooks, Geoffrey. London, Annapolis, Md: Greenhill Books, Naval Institute Press. ISBN 1-55750-186-6.
- Busch, Rainer; Röll, Hans-Joachim (1999). Deutsche U-Boot-Verluste von September 1939 bis Mai 1945 [German U-boat losses from September 1939 to May 1945]. Der U-Boot-Krieg (in German). Vol. IV. Hamburg, Berlin, Bonn: Mittler. ISBN 3-8132-0514-2.
- Gröner, Erich; Jung, Dieter; Maass, Martin (1991). U-boats and Mine Warfare Vessels. German Warships 1815–1945. Vol. 2. Translated by Thomas, Keith; Magowan, Rachel. London: Conway Maritime Press. ISBN 0-85177-593-4.
- Bishop, Chris (2006). Kriegsmarine U-Boats, 1939-45. London: Amber Books. ISBN 978-1-904687-96-2.
- Kemp, Paul (1999). U-Boats Destroyed - German Submarine Losses in the World Wars. London: Arms & Armour. ISBN 1-85409-515-3.
