= HMAS ML 827 =

Australian military vessel

History

Australia
- Ordered: 19 May 1942
- Builder: Norman Wright, Sydney
- Commissioned: 19 April 1944
- Fate: Sank in November 1944

General characteristics
- Class & type: Fairmile B class motor launch
- Displacement: 85 tons
- Length: 112 ft (34 m)
- Beam: 18 ft 3 in (5.56 m)
- Draught: 4 ft 9 in (1.45 m)
- Propulsion: Twin petrol engines totaling 1,200 bhp
- Speed: 20 knots (37 km/h; 23 mph)
- Range: 1,500 mi (1,300 nmi; 2,400 km) at 12 knots (22 km/h; 14 mph)
- Complement: 16
- Sensors & processing systems: ASDIC
- Armament: 1 × 3-lb Mk I gun 1 × twin 0.303-in Machineguns 12 depth charges
- Armour: Wheelhouse plated

HMAS ML 827 was a Fairmile B Motor Launch of the Royal Australian Navy.

== Fate ==
Commanded by Lieutenant Ian Fairley Graham Downs, OBE; While on patrol ML 827 went aground in Jacquinot Bay, New Britain on 17 November 1944. She capsized and sank while under tow on 20 November 1944 off Cape Kawai, New Britain.
