= USS Barbel (SS-316) =

Submarine of the United States

Coordinates: 7°49′N 116°47′E

History

United States
- Name: Barbel
- Builder: General Dynamics Electric Boat, Groton, Connecticut
- Laid down: 11 March 1943
- Launched: 14 November 1943
- Commissioned: 3 April 1944
- Fate: Sunk by Japanese aircraft off Palawan on 4 February 1945

General characteristics
- Class & type: Balao-class diesel-electric submarine
- Displacement: 1,526 long tons (1,550 t) surfaced; 2,424 long tons (2,463 t) submerged
- Length: 311 ft 9 in (95.02 m)
- Beam: 27 ft 3 in (8.31 m)
- Draft: 16 ft 10 in (5.13 m) maximum
- Propulsion: 4 × General Motors Model 16-278A V16 diesel engines driving electrical generators; 2 × 126-cell Sargo batteries; 4 × high-speed General Electric electric motors with reduction gears; 2 × propellers; 5,400 shp (4.0 MW) surfaced; 2,740 shp (2.0 MW) submerged
- Speed: 20.25 kn (37.50 km/h; 23.30 mph) surfaced; 8.75 kn (16.21 km/h; 10.07 mph) submerged
- Range: 11,000 nmi (20,000 km; 13,000 mi) at 10 kn (19 km/h; 12 mph)
- Endurance: 48 hours at 2 kn (3.7 km/h; 2.3 mph) submerged, 75 days on patrol
- Test depth: 400 ft (120 m)
- Complement: 10 officers, 70–71 enlisted
- Armament: 10 × 21-inch (533 mm) torpedo tubes; 6 forward, 4 aft; 24 torpedoes; 1 × 5-inch (127 mm) / 25 caliber deck gun; Bofors 40 mm and Oerlikon 20 mm cannon

USS Barbel (SS-316), a Balao-class submarine, was the first ship of the United States Navy to be named for the barbel, a fish commonly called a minnow or carp.

== Construction and commissioning ==
Barbel's keel was laid down by the Electric Boat Company of Groton, Connecticut. She was launched on 14 November 1943 sponsored by Mrs. Harold A. Allen, and commissioned 3 April 1944.

== Service history ==
Barbel arrived at Pearl Harbor on 21 June 1944 and commenced preparation for her first war patrol. From 15 July 1944 to 4 February 1945, she carried out four war patrols and is officially credited with sinking six Japanese ships totaling 15,263 tons.

Barbel departed Fremantle submarine base, Western Australia, on 5 January 1945 for the South China Sea on her fourth patrol. Late in January she was ordered to form a "wolfpack" with Perch and Gabilan and patrol the western approaches to Balabac Strait and the southern entrance to the Palawan Passage. On 3 February, Barbel sent a message reporting that she had been attacked three times by enemy aircraft dropping depth charges and would transmit further information on the following night.

Barbel was never heard from again. Japanese aviators reported an attack on a submarine off southwest Palawan on 4 February. Two bombs were dropped and one landed on the submarine near the bridge. The sub plunged, under a cloud of fire and spray. This was very likely the last engagement of Barbel. She was officially reported lost on 16 February 1945.

== Awards ==
- Asiatic-Pacific Campaign Medal with three battle stars for World War II service

== Memorials ==
Barbel has a war memorial in the Oregon Trail Veterans Cemetery in Casper, Wyoming.
