= HMS Zambesi =

Destroyer of the Royal Navy

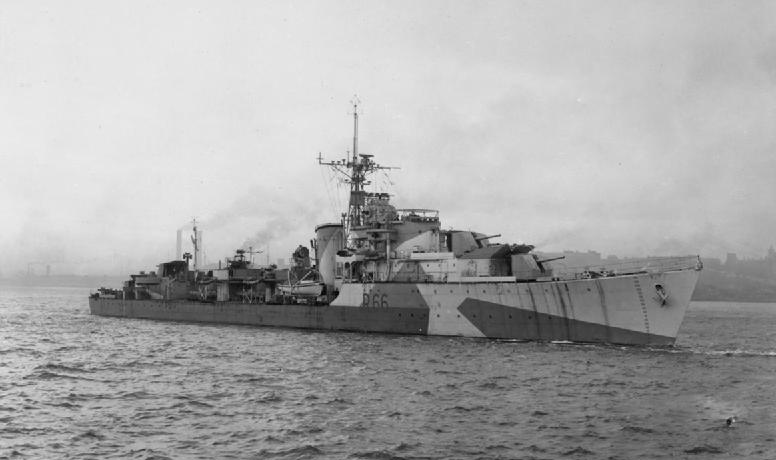
- HMS Zambesi under tow on the River Mersey, 19 July 1944

History

United Kingdom
- Name: HMS Zambesi
- Namesake: Zambesi
- Ordered: 12 February 1942
- Builder: Cammell Laird, Birkenhead
- Laid down: 21 December 1942
- Launched: 21 November 1943
- Commissioned: 18 July 1944
- Identification: Pennant number: R66 later changed to D66
- Honours and awards: -Norway 1944 - Arctic 1945
- Fate: Arrived John Cashmore Ltd, Newport for breaking up 12 February 1959
- Badge: On a Field Barry wavy, a crocodile

General characteristics
- Class & type: Z-class destroyer
- Displacement: 1,710 tons
- Length: 362 ft 9 in (110.57 m)
- Beam: 35 ft 8 in (10.87 m)
- Draught: 10 ft (3.0 m)
- Propulsion: Twin steam turbines
- Speed: 37 knots (69 km/h) maximum
- Complement: 185
- Armament: 4 × QF 4.5 in (114 mm) guns; 5 × 40 mm guns; 8 × 21 inch (533 mm) torpedo tubes

HMS Zambesi was a Z-class destroyer. She has been the only Royal Navy warship to bear that name. She was launched on 21 December 1942 at the Cammell Laird shipyard at Birkenhead and commissioned on 18 July 1944. She was 'adopted' by the civil community of Bromley, as part of Warship Week in 1942.

== Second World War ==
After a period of working up with ships of the Home Fleet at Scapa Flow she joined the 2nd Destroyer Flotilla, Home Fleet for screening duty and patrol on the North Western Approaches, including operations against the Tirpitz. She escorted a number of Arctic convoys, and other operations in the North Sea and off the coast of Scandinavia. As the war reached its end Zambesi was deployed with the Home Fleet to support operations to re-occupy countries previously under German occupation, and this included guardship duties.

== Postwar ==
After the end of the war Zambesi joined the 4th Destroyer Flotilla in which she served until 1947 when she was paid-off and was reduced to reserve status in the Plymouth Reserve Fleet. She remained in reserve until 1950, though received a refit at Gibraltar in 1948. In 1951 she was a target ship for the 3rd Submarine Flotilla, based at Rothesay. Between 1953 and 1954 she was given a refit at Penarth, before being held at reserve at Cardiff until 1959.

== Decommissioning and disposal ==
In 1959 Zambesi was placed on the Sale List and she was sold to Thos. W. Ward for breaking-up. On 12 February 1959 she arrived in tow at their yard at Briton Ferry, Wales.

Zambesi's bell was presented to St Cuthbert's Church in Portsmouth in 1959, where it still survives.

== Publications ==
- Colledge, J. J.; Warlow, Ben (2006) [1969]. Ships of the Royal Navy: The Complete Record of All Fighting Ships of the Royal Navy from the 15th Century to the Present (3rd Rev ed.). London: Chatham Publishing. ISBN 978-1-86176-281-8. OCLC 67375475.
- Marriott, Leo (1989). Royal Navy Destroyers Since 1945. Ian Allan Ltd. ISBN 0-7110-1817-0.
- Raven, Alan; Roberts, John (1978). War Built Destroyers O to Z Classes. London: Bivouac Books. ISBN 0-85680-010-4.
- Whitley, M. J. (1988). Destroyers of World War 2. Annapolis, Maryland: Naval Institute Press. ISBN 0-87021-326-1.
