= HMS Myngs (R06) =

Destroyer of the Royal Navy

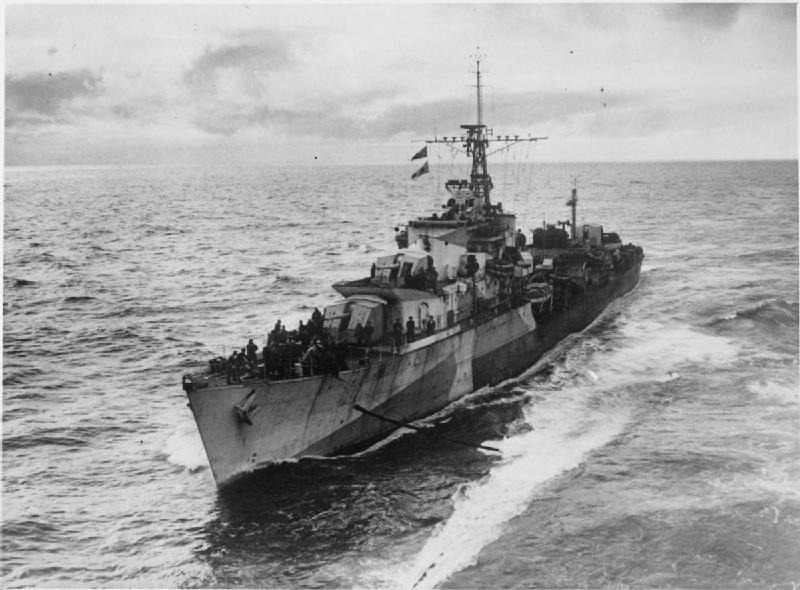
- HMS Myngs, circa 1944

History

United Kingdom
- Name: HMS Myngs
- Ordered: 12 February 1942
- Builder: Vickers-Armstrongs, High Walker
- Laid down: 27 May 1942
- Launched: 31 May 1943
- Completed: 23 June 1944
- Commissioned: 23 June 1944
- Identification: Pennant number: R06 initially, but changed to D06 after 1945
- Honours and awards: Zeebrugge 1918 - Norway 1944 - Arctic 1945
- Fate: Sold to Egypt, 1955
- Badge: On a Field Red, four naval cutlasses in Saltire Proper, pommels and hilts Gold.

Egypt
- Name: El Qaher
- Acquired: 1955
- Commissioned: 28 August 1956
- Fate: Sunk, 1970

General characteristics
- Class & type: Z-class destroyer
- Displacement: 1,710 tons
- Length: 362.7 ft (110.6 m)
- Beam: 35.7 ft (10.9 m)
- Propulsion: Geared turbines; two shafts; 40,000 hp (30,000 kW)
- Speed: 37 knots (69 km/h; 43 mph)
- Complement: 186
- Armament: 4 х 4.5 in (114 mm) guns; 5 х 40 mm guns; 8 х torpedo tubes

HMS Myngs was a Z-class destroyer of the Royal Navy built as a flotilla leader by Vickers-Armstrongs, High Walker. She served in the Second World War, taking part in operations in the North Sea and off the Norwegian coast, before taking part in some of the Arctic convoys. She spent a further ten years in Royal Navy service after the end of the war, before being sold to the Egyptian Navy, which operated her as El Qaher. She was sunk in an Israeli air attack on 16 May 1970.

== Second World War ==
On commissioning and work up Myngs joined the 2nd Destroyer Flotilla, as part of the Home Fleet. She operated in the North West approaches and escorted some Russian convoys. She also took part attacks on the German battleship Tirpitz, acting as part of a screen to protect the aircraft carriers who took part in the operation.

In April 1945 she transferred to the 4th Destroyer Flotilla. She took part in the Victory in Europe (VE) celebrations in London between June and August 1945, along with the destroyers Zest and Zealous.

== Postwar service ==
Between June 1946 and August 1947 Myngs was part of the 4th Destroyer Flotilla of the Home Fleet. In August 1948 she was part of the 3rd Escort Flotilla, based at Portland. Between April 1949 and August 1954 she was part of the 2nd Training Flotilla at Portland. In September 1954 she was placed in reserve pending conversion to a Type 15 frigate. In June 1953 she attended the Coronation Review at Spithead. However in May 1955 she was transferred Egypt along with Zenith.

== Egyptian service ==
Myngs was sold to Egypt in 1955 and commissioned into the Egyptian Navy as El Qaher. She was refitted by White, Cowes and sailed for Egypt on 28 August 1956. She returned to White's for another refit between May 1963 and July 1964.

On 16 May 1970, El Qaher was sunk by Israeli Air Force aircraft at Berenice, Egypt, during the War of Attrition.

== Publications ==
- Colledge, J. J.; Warlow, Ben (2006) [1969]. Ships of the Royal Navy: The Complete Record of All Fighting Ships of the Royal Navy from the 15th Century to the Present (3rd Rev ed.). London: Chatham Publishing. ISBN 978-1-86176-281-8. OCLC 67375475.
- Marriott, Leo (1989). Royal Navy Destroyers Since 1945. Ian Allan Ltd. ISBN 0-7110-1817-0.
- Raven, Alan; Roberts, John (1978). War Built Destroyers O to Z Classes. London: Bivouac Books. ISBN 0-85680-010-4.
- Whitley, M. J. (1988). Destroyers of World War 2. Annapolis, Maryland: Naval Institute Press. ISBN 0-87021-326-1.
