= Bijan Allipour =

Iranian business executive (1949–2023)

- بیژن عالی‌پور
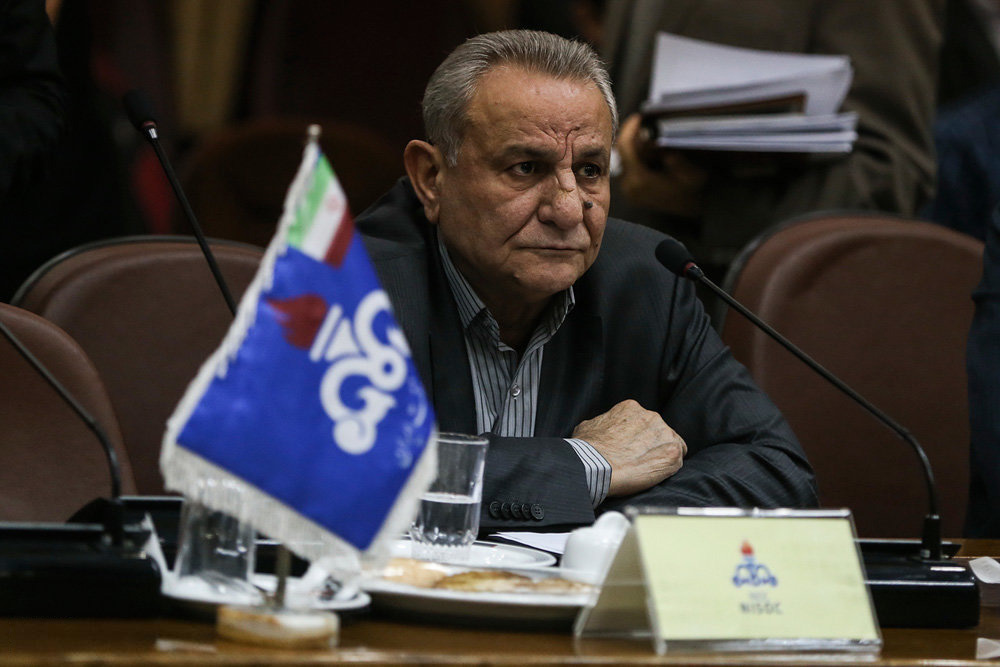
- Allipour in 2016
- Born: 27 March 1949; Masjed Soleyman, Iran
- Died: 7 December 2023 (aged 74)
- Education: University of Central Oklahoma
- Occupation: CEO of NISOC (2014–2018)

Bijan Allipour (Persian: بیژن عالی‌پور; 27 March 1949 – 7 December 2023) was an Iranian business executive and upstream oil and gas expert. He was an advisor to the Petroleum Minister of Iran (Bijan Zangeneh) in development projects. He was chairman and CEO of National Iranian South Oil Company (NISOC) from 2014 to 2018. Allipour was also a member of the board of directors of National Iranian Oil Company (NIOC). He had earlier been the senior executive vice president of NISOC, which he had joined in 1979.

Allipour held a master's degree in Industrial Engineering from the University of Central Oklahoma. Among other positions, Allipour used to have in NISOC are Manager of Engineering and Construction, Director of Road & Construction and Head of Transportation and Logistics of NIOC. Formerly, he had been the Advisor to Khuzestan's Governor in Civil Projects.

In 2015, NISOC was the largest Iranian oil company and produced about 3 million barrels of oil per day. NISOC output accounted for nearly 83% of total crude oil production of Iran.

Allipour died on 7 December 2023, at the age of 74.

== Early life and education ==
Allipour was born in Masjed Soleyman, Iran, in 1949. He held a B.S. in Mechanical Engineering and master's degree of Industrial Engineering from the University of Central Oklahoma.

== Career ==
Prior to his appointment as managing director of NISOC, Allipour held the following positions:

- Member of the board of directors at the National Iranian Oil Company.
- Advisor to the Petroleum Minister of Iran in development projects.
- Chairman and CEO of National Iranian South Oil Company (NISOC).
- Chairman of Karoun, Marun, Aghajari, Masjed Soleyman and Gachsaran Oil and Gas Production Companies.
- Program Manager of Petro Iran Company.
- General Manager of Engineering & Construction at NISOC.
- Vice president of National Iranian South Oil Company.
- Head of Road & Construction of NIOC.
- Director of Transportation and Logistics of NIOC.
- Advisor to Khuzestan's Governor in Civil Projects.

Allipour was also a member of the board of trustees of the Cultural Heritage, Handicrafts and Tourism Organization of Iran.
