= Iranian Central Oil Fields Company =

- Type: State-owned enterprise
- Industry: Oil and gas
- Founded: 1999; 27 years ago
- Headquarters: Tehran, Iran
- Key people: Peyman Imani (CEO)
- Products: Oil, natural gas
- Owner: National Iranian Oil Company
- Website: icofc.ir

The Iranian Central Oil Fields Company (ICOFC; Persian: شرکت نفت مناطق مرکزی ایران) is one of the five major production companies of the National Iranian Oil Company. Established in 1999, it is responsible for production of gas and oil from 76 reservoirs, comprising 45 gas fields and 31 oilfields; among them, 14 gas fields and 13 oilfields are currently in operation, and by the end of the 20 year outlook plan it will have reached 89 fields in 19 provinces. The company was originally assigned to develop and produce oil and gas from onshore fields through utilization of all available technology and know-how. As of 2015, ICOFC is the largest natural gas producer in Iran.

== Southern Zagros Oil & Gas Production Company ==
Based in Shiraz, this firm is in charge of production from the fields in 5 southern provinces; Fars, Boshehr, Hormozgan, Kohgiloyeh & Boyerahmad, and Charmahal & Bakhtiyari. The refineries feed gas and condensate is produced from four operational regions such as Nar-Kangan, Aghar-Dalan, Parsian, Gheshm-Sarkhon including 10 gas fields known as Aghar, Dalan, Nar, Kangan, Tabnak, Gavarzin, Sarkhon, Homa, Varavi and Shanol. The oil and gas It produces goes to the refineries in Farashband, Fajr, Sarkhon and Parsian. In addition to gas fields, some oilfields such as Sarvestan, Sa'adat Abad and Khesht will have been operated in SZOGPC in near future by which some 45 thousand barrels of oil will be added to country's output. Present average gas and condensate production of the company is 250 million cubic meters per day and 74 thousand barrels per day, respectively. Maximum gas and condensate production of the company in 1388 (2009–2010) stood at 255 million cubic meters per day and 76.5 thousand barrels per day, respectively.

== West Oil & Gas Production Company ==
Based in Kermanshah, this firm was established in 2000. There are 5 provinces in its area: Ilam, Kermanshah, Lorestan, Qom and some northern parts of Khozestan. This subsidiary has focused on producing oil and gas from 5 operational regions. : Cheshmeh Khosh, Dehloran, Sarkan, Naftshahr and Tang-e-bijar At the outset, the company started producing 52.8 thousand barrels of oil per day while the trend has boosted through some operational and engineering measures. Currently, average oil production of the company stands at 165 thousand barrels per day and some 7 million cubic meters of gas and 7 thousand barrels of condensate is produced as well.

== East Oil & Gas Production Company ==
Based in Mashhad, this firm was established in 2001. At the outset, it commenced its activity to produce, separate and transmit gas and condensate in order to provide gas for Hashemi nejad refinery. Activity zone of the company is in Khorasan Razavi province. The subsidiary producesa gas and condensate from Khangiran and Gonbadli fields in Sarakhs. This company provides gas for household and industrial consumption of provinces like Northern and southern Khorasan, Mazandaran, Golestan, Semnan, Khorasan Razavi and Gillan. It is also responsible for supplying gas for Khorasan petrochemical unit and Neka power plant. Its average gas and condensate production 48 million cubic meters per day and 29.2 thousand barrels per day, respectively. Maximum gas and condensate production of the company in 1388(2009–2010) stood at 58 million cubic meters per day and 33 thousand barrels per day, respectively. Gas production capacity of the company is 61mcm/d.

== See also ==
- Petroleum industry in Iran
- National Iranian Oil Company
- National Iranian South Oil Company
