= NIGC =

NIGC may refer to:

- National Iranian Gas Company
- National Indian Gaming Commission in the United States
