= Karanj oil field =

Iranian oil field

- Location within Iran
- Country: Iran
- Region: Khuzestan Province
- Offshore/onshore: Onshore
- Coordinates: 31°16′48″N 49°36′13″E
- Operators: NISOC
- Partners: NIOC

Field history
- Discovery: 1963
- Start of production: 1988

Production
- Current production of oil: 237,000 barrels per day (~1.18×10^{7} t/a)
- Estimated oil in place: 11,043 million barrels (~1.507×10^{9} t)
- Recoverable oil: 5,700 million barrels (~7.8×10^{8} t)

The Karanj oil field is an Iranian oil field located 120 kilometres (75 mi) east of the Ahvaz City, in Khuzestan Province. It was discovered in 1963 and the production was started after installing production facilities in 1964. Oil production of Karanj field is about 200,000 barrels per day (32,000 m^{3}/d). The field has a 650-metre thick oil column with an API gravity of 33.9 deg. Its oil reserves have been estimated at 11.2 bn barrels, with gas at about 3.5 TCF. A gas injection project at Karanj was completed in 1995. The field is owned by state-owned National Iranian Oil Company (NIOC) and operated by National Iranian South Oil Company (NISOC).

== See also ==
- List of oil fields
