= Rag Sefid oil field =

Oil field in Khuzestan, Iran

- Location within Iran
- Country: Iran
- Region: Khuzestan Province
- Offshore/onshore: Onshore
- Coordinates: 30°10′N 50°16′E
- Operators: NISOC
- Partners: NIOC

Field history
- Discovery: 1964
- Start of production: 1966

Production
- Current production of oil: 180,000 barrels per day (~9.0×10^{6} t/a)
- Estimated oil in place: 14,500 million barrels (~1.98×10^{9} t)
- Estimated gas in place: 17,990×10^{9} m^{3} (635×10^{12} cu ft)

The Rag Sefid oil field is an oil field located in Khuzestan Province, approximately 6 km in nearest distance from the Persian Gulf, southwest Iran. It was discovered in 1964 and developed by National Iranian Oil Company and began production in 1966. The total proven reserves of the Rag Sefid oil field are around 14,5 billion barrels, and production is centered on 180,000 barrels per day (29,000 m^{3}/d). The field is owned by state-owned National Iranian Oil Company (NIOC) and operated by National Iranian South Oil Company (NISOC).

On 29 October 2017, a blowout occurred in the offshore well 147 and burnt for 59 days before it was brought under control. Since it contains 54.16 tcf of natural gas (largest natural gas of the country after the Pazanan oil field), controlling this fire was considered a record. Two other fires affected the oil field in 1966 and 1975, and the intervention of American oil companies and 100 days had been necessary to contain those. The fire could have been contained more rapidly, but the challenge evolved around containing the gas that could have killed all living creatures in a large radius if released. Relief wells had to be drilled to engage in a bottom kill procedure.

== See also ==
- List of oil fields
