= 1973 Sale and Purchase Agreement =

Agreement of oil control in Iran

The 1973 Sale and Purchase Agreement was a 20-year agreement pressured by the Shah of Iran on the oil consortium that nullified The Consortium Agreement of 1954 and provided the National Iranian Oil Company with complete control of Iranian petroleum, nationalizing the nation's oil reserves. By 1975, western oil companies complained of the agreement and demanded renegotiation marking the first time in history that oil companies rather than the oil producing nations sought to negotiate an oil contract.

== Background ==
The Shah had ambitions for a "Great Civilization" in which Iran would one day become the largest oil producer in the world. He used Iran's development to establish himself as a strongman across the Middle East and the Persian Gulf and create an oil oligarchy controlling the price of oil. In the 1960s, the Shah initiated the formation and organization of large oil-exporting countries which would become known as the Organization of the Petroleum Exporting Countries (OPEC). The Shah also sought to terminate the 1954 Consortium Agreement an effort which was finalized with the 1973 Sale and Purchase Agreement. In response to the creation of OPEC, Maurice Bridgman of British Petroleum warned the National Iranian Oil Company about

"unhappy events that would harm Iran's interests and the oil industry and damage the mutual confidence that surely ought to prevail."

According to Dr. Parviz Mina, an expert on Iranian Oil Affairs and previous director of the National Iranian Oil Company,

"In the early 1970s, Iran and the Shah himself officially gave an ultimatum to the Consortium, saying that if they refused to overhaul the terms of the 1954 Agreement and sign a new one instead, the Consortium Agreement would be terminated at the end of the initial twenty-five-year period, i.e. by 1979, and the period would not be extended. Following this warning, representatives of the Consortium member companies, fully aware of the stance of the National Iranian Oil Company on the terms and conditions to be revised, visited the Shah several times in the winter of 1972 in St. Maurice, and in the last meeting, presented the Shah with a treaty containing the terms and conditions, which is known as the St. Maurice Document. After the Shah's return to Iran, negotiations between the National Oil Company and representatives of the consortium to prepare a new contract began in early 1973. At that time, I was given the chairmanship of the delegation of the National Oil Company in the negotiations with the Consortium. Dr. Reza Fallah also participated in these negotiations as an observer. These negotiations lasted for several months, and a new contract called the Sales and Purchase Agreement, was signed on June 31, 1973, and became law after it received the approval of the two legislative bodies (the Parliament and the Senate of Iran) on July 31, 1973."

== Result ==
In the summer of 1973, Iran exploited the supply shortage to double crude oil prices further reducing the power of the oil consortium. Political balance shifted from oil companies to oil producing nations.
