= Abteymour oil field =

Iranian oil field

- Country: Iran
- Region: Khuzestan province
- Offshore/onshore: Onshore
- Operators: NISOC
- Partners: NIOC

Field history
- Discovery: 1967
- Start of production: 1991

Production
- Current production of oil: 48,000 barrels per day (~2.4×10^{6} t/a)
- Estimated oil in place: 12,200 million barrels (~1.66×10^{9} t)

The Abteymour oil field is an Iranian oil field located in Khuzestan province, in 25 km from west of the Ahvaz City. It was discovered in 1967 and production began in 1991. The field produces about 48,000 barrels per day (7,600 m^{3}/d). Its oil reserves have been estimated at 12.2 bn barrel. The field is owned by state-owned National Iranian Oil Company (NIOC) and operated by National Iranian South Oil Company (NISOC).

== See also ==
- List of oil fields
