= Madar gas field =

Natural gas field in Iran

Madar
- Country: Iran
- Region: Fars province
- Offshore/onshore: onshore
- Operator: National Iranian Oil Company

Field history
- Discovery: 2011
- Start of production: 2011

Production
- Current production of gas: 8.6×10^{6} m^{3}/d 300×10^{6} cu ft/d 3.1×10^{9} m^{3}/a (110×10^{9} cu ft/a)
- Estimated gas in place: 500×10^{9} m^{3} 17.5×10^{12} cu ft

The Madar gas field is an Iranian natural gas field that was discovered in 2011, announced by Ahmad Qalebani (then managing director of the National Iranian Oil Company). It began production in 2011 and produces natural gas and condensates. The total proven reserves of the Madar gas field are around 17.5 trillion cubic feet (500 billion m^{3}) and production is slated to be around 300 million cubic feet/day (8.6 million m^{3}).
