= Pazanan oil field =

Oil field in Khuzestan, Iran

Pazanan
- Location within Iran
- Country: Iran
- Region: Khuzestan Province
- Offshore/onshore: onshore
- Coordinates: 30°32′22″N 51°41′29″E
- Operator: National Iranian South Oil Company
- Partners: National Iranian Oil Company

Field history
- Discovery: 1936
- Start of production: 1974

Production
- Current production of oil: 31,000 barrels per day (~1.5×10^{6} t/a)
- Current production of gas: 22×10^{6} m^{3}/d 750×10^{6} cu ft/d 7.9×10^{9} m^{3}/a (280×10^{9} cu ft/a)
- Estimated gas in place: 1.43×10^{12} m^{3} 50×10^{12} cu ft
- Producing formations: Miocene

The Pazanan oil field is an Iranian oil and natural gas field that is located in 170 km South East of Ahvaz in Khuzestan province of Iran and between Aghajari and Bibi Hakimeh fields. The field is discovered in 1936. It began production in 1974 and about 119 wells have been drilled in it. This field is one of huge retrograde gas condensate reservoir in Iran. The total proven reserves of the Pazanan oil field are around 50 trillion cubic feet (1.4 trillion m^{3}) and production is slated to be around 750 million cubic feet/day (22 million m^{3}) and around 31000 bpd.
