= National Iranian Drilling Company =

National Iranian Drilling Company (NIDC) is an Iranian company. The company was founded in 1979 and is based in Ahwaz, Iran. NIDC operates as a subsidiary of National Iranian Oil Company. NIDC engages in the exploration, development, and delineation drilling of oil and gas wells. It owns and operates drilling rigs and equipment for providing drilling services.

The company’s services include well logging, cementing and acidizing, drill stem test, well testing, training and development, and general services. It also provides engineering, programming, and industrial cleaning services to steam boilers, compressors suction and lub oil systems, water jackets, chillers, and heat exchangers, as well as industrial cleaning services to the oil and gas refineries. NIDC is in charge of all offshore and onshore drilling activities. NIDC provides more than 90 percent of drilling services needed by the oil companies inside the country. In 2011, NIDC, drilled or completed 192 oil and gas wells, drilled 454 thousand meters of wells and provided more than 8 thousand expert or technical services to customers.

== See also ==
- National Iranian Oil Company
- Petroleum industry in Iran
