= Halegan gas field =

Iranian natural gas field

Halegan
- Country: Iran
- Region: Hormozgan Province
- Offshore/onshore: onshore
- Operator: National Iranian Oil Company

Field history
- Discovery: 2010
- Start of production: 2010

Production
- Current production of gas: 14.2×10^{6} m^{3}/d 500×10^{6} cu ft/d 5.21×10^{9} m^{3}/a (184×10^{9} cu ft/a)
- Estimated gas in place: 355×10^{9} m^{3} 12.4×10^{12} cu ft

The Halegan gas field is an Iranian natural gas field that was discovered in 2010. It began production in 2010 and produces natural gas and condensates. The total proven reserves of the Halegan gas field are around 12.4 trillion cubic feet (355 billion m^{3}) and production is slated to be around 500 million cubic feet/day (14.2 million m^{3}).
