= Khorram Kushk =

Khorram Kushk خرم‌کوشک
- Neighborhood
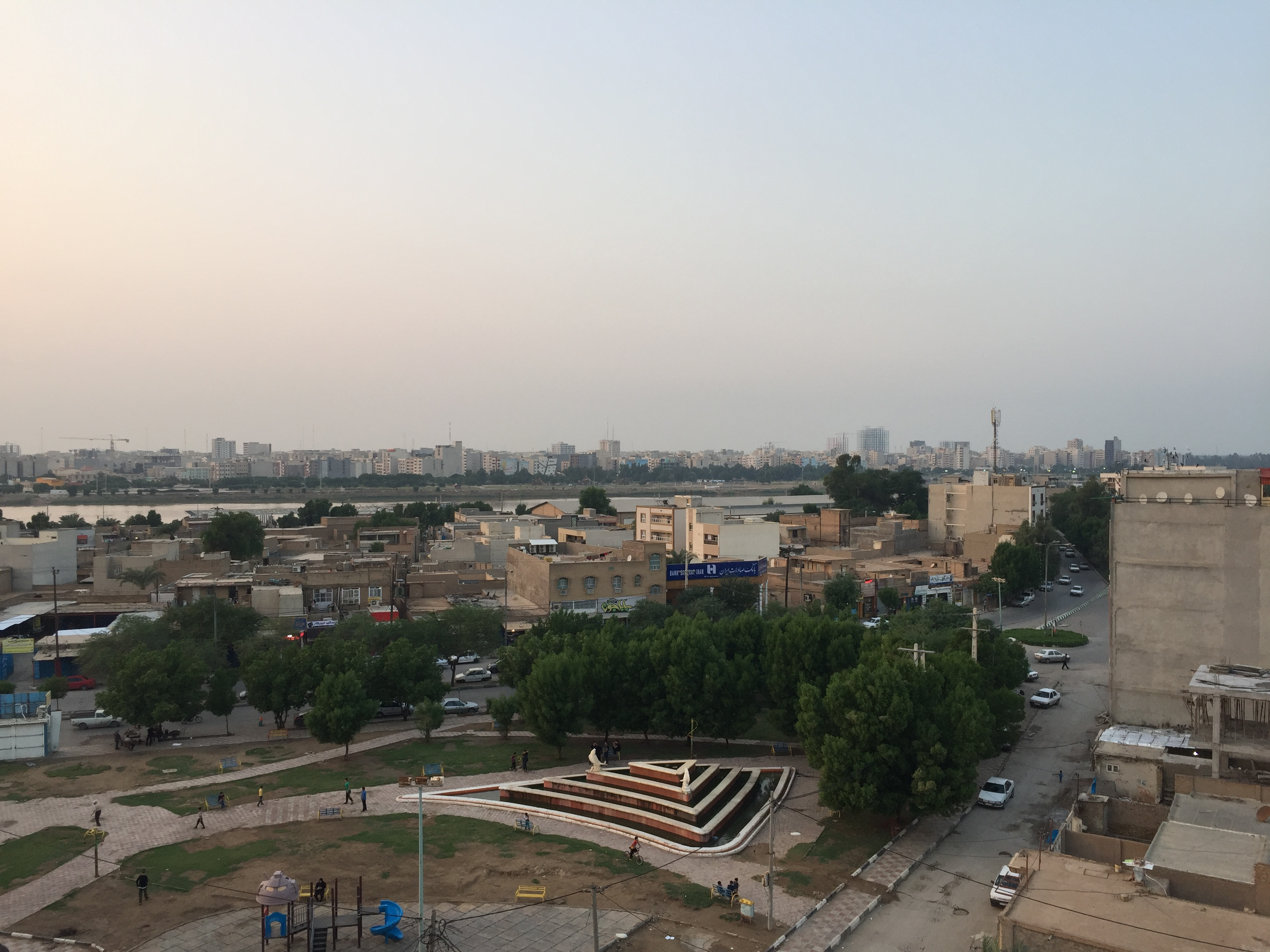
- Interactive map of Khorram Kushk
- Coordinates: 31°20′6.8″N 48°41′44.3″E
- Country: Iran
- Province: Khuzestan
- City: Ahvaz

Khorram Kushk (Persian: خرم‌کوشک) is a historic neighborhood located in the eastern part of Ahvaz, in Khuzestan Province, Iran. It lies near the eastern bank of the Karun River and is considered one of the city's older and culturally significant districts.

== Etymology ==
The name Khorram Kushk derives from Persian terms meaning "pleasant pavilion" or "green estate," referring to the gardens and orchards historically present along the Karun River.

== Geography ==
Khorram Kushk is situated in the east–southeast of Ahvaz and borders the neighborhoods of:

- Ameri
- New Side (New Site)
- Zeytoon Kargari
- Asiabad

Major thoroughfares in the district include:

- Shariati Street
- Khorram Kushk Street
- Behbahani Boulevard

The area is connected to central Ahvaz and the riverfront through multiple public transport corridors.

== History ==
Historically, the area consisted of garden-houses, palm groves, and agricultural estates situated along the riverside. During the mid-20th century, Khorram Kushk became a residential and administrative zone for employees of the National Iranian South Oil Company (NISOC) and other petroleum-sector institutions. This development contributed to the modern planned layout of the neighborhood.

== Archaeological significance ==
Regional news agencies have reported the discovery of pottery fragments, burial grounds, and historical cultural layers in parts of Khorram Kushk. Additional reports highlighted concerns that some archaeological areas were inadvertently covered with cement during construction projects.

Although these discoveries suggest historical depth, no systematic archaeological excavation has yet been formally published.

== During the Iran–Iraq War ==
As part of the city of Ahvaz—one of the primary urban centers affected by the Iran–Iraq War—Khorram Kushk experienced indirect wartime effects. Most available details come from local oral histories rather than published academic sources.

== Urban features ==
Notable features of the neighborhood include:

- Khorram Kushk Garden, a historic green area currently discussed for preservation and revitalization.
- Former petroleum-company administrative and residential buildings.
- Proximity to the eastern bank of the Karun River, contributing to the neighborhood's urban and environmental identity.

== Demographics ==
Before the 1980s, Khorram Kushk was traditionally populated by employees of petroleum companies and their families before 1980s. In recent decades, the population has diversified, including local Ahvazi families and mixed-income households. The neighborhood reflects Persian, Arab, and Khuzestani cultural influences typical of the region.

== Contemporary issues ==
Urban challenges currently associated with Khorram Kushk include:

- land-use change and new construction,
- debates about the preservation of potential archaeological sites,
- efforts to restore historical green spaces such as the Khorram Kushk Garden.
