= Lavan gas field =

Gas field in Hormozgan Province, Iran

Lavan
- Country: Iran
- Region: Hormozgan Province
- Offshore/onshore: onshore
- Operator: National Iranian Oil Company

Field history
- Discovery: 2011
- Start of production: 2011

Production
- Current production of gas: 21.4×10^{6} m^{3}/d 750×10^{6} cu ft/d 7.8×10^{9} m^{3}/a (280×10^{9} cu ft/a)
- Estimated gas in place: 271×10^{9} m^{3} 9.5×10^{12} cu ft

The Lavan gas field is an Iranian natural gas field that was discovered in 2011. It began production in 2011 and produces natural gas and condensates. The total proven reserves of the Lavan gas field are around 9.5 trillion cubic feet (271 billion m^{3}) and production is slated to be around 750 million cubic feet/day (21.4 million m^{3}).
