= Research Institute of Petroleum Industry =

Iranian research institute

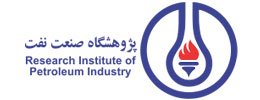
- Research Institute of Petroleum Industry(RIPI)

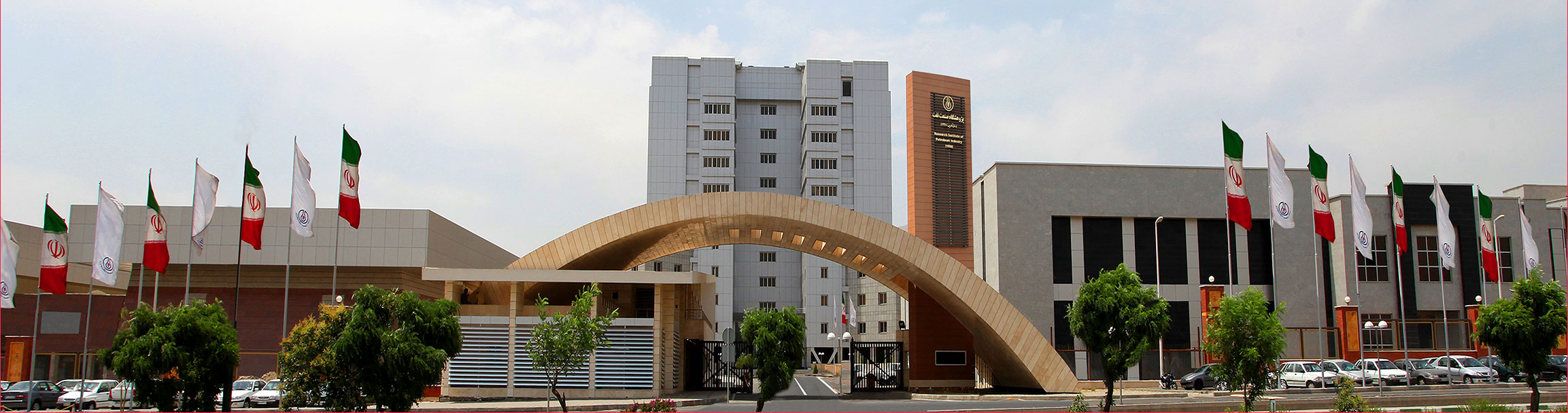
- Native name: پژوهشگاه صنعت نفت
- Formerly: Petroleum Industry Research Development Office
- Type: State-owned enterprise
- Industry: Oil and gas
- Founded: 1959
- Headquarters: Iran
- Key people: Hamid Bovard (Minister of Petroleum); Azim Kalantari Asl (CEO)
- Products: Petroleum; Natural gas; Motor fuels; Aviation fuels; Petrochemicals
- Owner: Iranian government (100%)
- Number of employees: 1628
- Website: www.ripi.ir

The Research Institute of Petroleum Industry, also known as NIOC-RIPI, often shortened to RIPI (Persian: پژوهشگاه صنعت نفت romanized: Pajouhesh-Gah-e San'at-e Naft) is a governmental research institute founded in 1959 in Tehran, Iran and is affiliated with National Iranian Oil Company.

The institute is a major research institute in Iran and is the largest of its kind in the Middle East. RIPI has become a major technology provider for Iran's petroleum industry. In 2002, it developed a technology that converts heavy crude oil into the more desirable, a new generation of GTL technology.

== History ==
Research Institute of Petroleum Industry was initially established under the title of “Iran Petroleum Industry Research Development Office” in 1959. (Persian: اداره توسعه و تحقیقات شرکت ملی نفت ایران ) Its primary aim was carrying out research on application of petroleum materials. After revolution of Islamic Republic of Iran, the office was changed into a center for “Research and Scientific Services”(Persian: مرکز پژوهش و خدمات علمی ) and it has continued its activities in order to achieve the objectives. In 1989, upon the formal agreement of the development council of Department of Culture and Higher Education, the center was called “Research Institute of Petroleum Industry” and with the aim of carrying out fundamental, applied, and developmental researchers has continued doing its activities.

Strategy of PIRI is creating added value via production and commercialization of technology, with the approach of carrying out research for development of new technologies and indigenization of new technologies. Production of products such as technical knowledge, patents, and presentation of papers in magazines are other activities besides its main mission.

In proclamation of supreme leader of Iran on general policies of resistive economy, there are two clauses which relate to enhancement in strategic reservoirs of oil and gas and increase in added value through completion of the value chain of gas and oil industry. PIRI is the key element in realization of these objectives. In line with the goals of vision2025 document in which Iran is considered as a developed country occupying the first economic, scientific and technological place in the region; and by establishing an effective interaction in its international affairs, PIRI tries to reach the first scientific rank in the region.

== Staff ==
RIPI has 1628 staff including 145 Ph.Ds, 458 M.Scs and 281 B.Scs.

== Sections ==
RIPI has three campuses:

- Upstream Petroleum Industry - studies are in association with geology, hydrocarbon reservoir, exploration, production and petroleum engineering and field management and development are performed.
- Downstream Petroleum Industry - studies on refinery and petrochemical processes especially catalysts synthesis and characterization, nanotechnology, gas processing and distribution and polymer synthesis.
- Energy and Environment - deals with renewable energy such as fuel cell technology and the environmental issues regarding energy conversions.

Sub-sections and faculties are included in each campus, which in turn are hosts to research groups in the fields of oil and gas.

== See also ==
- Petroleum University of Technology
- Higher education in Iran
- Science and technology in Iran
- National Iranian Oil Company
