= Ahvaz Field =

Oil field in Iran

Ahvaz oil field
- Location within Iran
- Country: Iran
- Region: Khuzestan
- Offshore/onshore: Onshore
- Coordinates: 31°19′13″N 48°40′09″E
- Operators: NISOC
- Partners: NIOC

Field history
- Discovery: 1953
- Start of production: 1954

Production
- Current production of oil: 750,000 barrels per day (~3.7×10^{7} t/a)
- Current production of gas: 450×10^{6} cu ft/d (13×10^{6} m^{3}/d)
- Estimated oil in place: 65,500 million barrels (~8.94×10^{9} t)
- Recoverable oil: 37,000 million barrels (~5.0×10^{9} t)
- Estimated gas in place: 11,000×10^{9} cu ft (310×10^{9} m^{3})
- Producing formations: Oligocene-Miocene; Cretaceous; Jurassic

Ahvaz Field is a super-giant oil field located in Ahvaz, Khuzestan, Iran. It was discovered in 1953, developed by Anglo-Persian Oil Company and began production in 1954. Ahvaz field is one of the richest oil fields in the world with an estimated proven reserves around 65.5 billion barrels (~8.94×10^{9} t), and production is centered on 750,000 barrels per day (119,000 m^{3}/d). The field is owned by National Iranian Oil Company (NIOC) and operated by National Iranian South Oil Company (NISOC).

== History ==
Ahvaz oil field was discovered in 1953 by Anglo-Persian Oil Company (APOC). A year later, in 1954 oil production started at an average of 35,000 barrels per day. So far, more than 600 oil wells have been drilled and completed on the field.

The super-giant Ahvaz field is the largest oil field in Iran and is located in the southwestern of the country, in the prolific zagros basin. Production from the field comes from the Asmari and the Bangestan reservoirs which respectively started producing in 1959 and 1972. The field is one of the largest contributors to national production and although production is in decline, it remains the largest individual oil producer in Iran.

In Ahwaz field, there are 5 production units that been constructed between 1953 and 1969. At present, the crude oil production is about 800,000 barrels a day and the amount of natural gas processed in this field is more than 13 million cubic meters (450 million cubic feet) per day. The field is owned by National Iranian Oil Company (NIOC) and operated by National Iranian South Oil Company (NISOC).

== Geology ==
The Ahvaz field is the third largest oil field in the world. The field is one of the most important oil fields in the Zagros basin, which is located in the Dezful embayment. The trend of ahvaz oil field is northwest-southeast parallel to the Zagros Mountains.

The ahvaz field is a series of structures trending NW-SE caused by uplift movement due to the Zagros reverse fault, with production area of about 67 kilometres (42 mi) long and 6 kilometres (3.7 mi) wide.

The ahvaz oil field is made up of three main subsurface structures, known as the Asmari, Bangestan, and Khami formations. The asmari formation deposited in the zagros foreland basin, during the Oligocene-Miocene.

== Reservoir ==
Ahvaz reportedly holds an estimated 65 billion barrels (1.03×10^{10} m^{3}) of oil; which accounts for 23% of Iran's oil reserves, estimated at 157 billion barrels. The oil sits approximately 2,400 m (7,900 ft) below the surface which is considered an easy target for production.

== Production ==
As of September 2016, the field produces 800,000 barrels per day (130,000 m^{3}/d) making up 20% of Iran's oil production of 4.2 million barrels per day (670,000 m^{3}/d). Currently ~430 production wells are operating at ahvaz field.

Oil production is operated by Karoon Oil and Gas Production Company (a subsidiary of NISOC) with 8 Production Units (degassing units) currently installed. These stations provide 3-phase separation (oil, water & natural gas). Crude oil is sent by pipeline to local refineries or pumping to ports in Kharg Island for export. Natural gas is provided to Gas Injection Facilities. Water is disposed into disposal wells.

== See also ==
- List of oil fields
- National Iranian Oil Company
- National Iranian South Oil Company
