= Gachsaran oil field =

Oil field in Kohgiluyeh and Boyer-Ahmad, Iran

- Location of the Gachsaran oil field within Iran
- Country: Iran
- Region: Kohgiluyeh and Boyer-Ahmad
- Offshore/onshore: onshore
- Coordinates: 30°21′N 50°48′E
- Operator: NISOC
- Partners: NIOC

Field history
- Discovery: 1928
- Start of production: 1930
- Peak year: 1976

Production
- Current production of oil: 560,000 barrels per day (~2.8×10^{7} t/a)
- Estimated oil in place: 52,900 million barrels (~7.22×10^{9} t)
- Recoverable oil: 23,700 million barrels (~3.23×10^{9} t)
- Producing formations: Miocene; Cretaceous

The Gachsaran oil field, until 1937 named Gach-i-Qaraghuli, is an Iranian oil field located in Kohgiluyeh and Boyer-Ahmad Province and is around Gachsaran city or Dogonbadan. It was discovered in 1928 and developed by Anglo-Persian Oil Company. It began production of crude oil in 1930. The total proven reserves of the Gachsaran field are around 52.9 billion barrels (9.394 billion tonnes), and production is centered on 560,000 barrels per day (89,000 m^{3}/d). The field is owned by National Iranian Oil Company (NIOC) and operated by National Iranian South Oil Company (NISOC).

== Production History ==
No. 1 well was started with a cable tool rig in 1926 and abandoned at 3,641ft as a dry hole. No. 2 well struck high pressure water at 4,228ft and was completed at 4,521ft. No. 3 well was spudded in 1928 and struck high pressure oil at 3,250ft. No. 4 well was spudded in 1929 and struck 1,990 psi gas at 2,734ft. Drilling was shut down in 1930 until suitable tools for dealing with the high pressures could be obtained. Drilling resumed at the end of 1936. No. 3 was deepened to 3,393ft by rotary drill and rated at 33,000bpd at 850psi. On the northeast flank of the structure No. 6 well gave 3,000bpd at 3,368ft and No. 7 gave 33,000bpd at 3,347ft.

Just before World War 2 broke out in Europe, APOC announced it would construct a 165 mile 12-inch pipeline to connect the field to the Abadan refinery and the new Bandar Shapur refinery. The 125 mile pipeline was completed during 1939.

Gachsaran is a mature oil field that experienced its peak production in 1976. Production from the Gachsaran oil field is declining due to its mature status. Contributing factors include a lack of investment, sanctions, and the natural decline rate of mature fields.
