= Rhum gasfield =

Gas field in the UK sector of the North Sea

Coordinates: 60.116°N 1.723°E

Rhum Gas Field
- Location within North Sea
- Country: Scotland, United Kingdom
- Location: Central North Sea
- Block: 3/29
- Offshore/onshore: Offshore
- Operator: Serica Energy
- Partners: Serica Energy; National Iranian Oil Company

Field history
- Discovery: 1977
- Start of production: 2005

The Rhum Gas Field (Persian: میدان گاز رهام) is a gas field owned halfly between Serica Energy and Iran, located 205 miles (330 km) north-east of Aberdeen in UK, in 109 metres (350 ft) of water. Its gas production and export began on 20 December 2005.

Development of the Rhum project cost approximately £350 million. Prior to the start of production, Rhum was the largest remaining undeveloped gas reservoir in the UK Continental Shelf. The original partners in the Rhum field were BP (Operator) 50% and Iranian Oil Company (U.K.) Limited (a subsidiary of the National Iranian Oil Company) 50%. The Rhum field is a high-temperature, high-pressure reservoir, experiencing down-hole temperatures of 150 °C and pressures of 12,700 psi. By comparison, the Bruce gas field, records temperatures of 99 °C and pressures of 6,000 psi.

Rhum, which lies in block 3/29, was discovered in 1977 by well 3/29a-2. An earlier well (3/29-1) which was drilled in 1973, was abandoned due to the high pressure gas. With the combination of a high pressure, high temperature (HPHT) gas reservoir developed using a long distance subsea tie-back, exploitation of Rhum is regarded by BP as a world first.

Plateau production of 300 million standard cubic feet per day is expected from the field. Rhum is expected to access recoverable reserves of 800 billion cubic feet of gas (23 billion cubic metres).

The field is tied back to the Serica-operated Bruce platform via a 28-mile (44 km) long 22-inch (560 mm) High Integrity Pipeline Protection System (HIPPS) protected pipe-in-pipe main export pipeline. New gas processing facilities were installed on the existing Bruce Compression Reception Centre (CR) platform to process gas from Rhum. Gas is exported from Bruce via the Frigg pipeline system to St Fergus. Associated condensate is piped via Bruce into the Forties Pipeline System.
