= Bibi Hakimeh oil field =

Oil field in Bibi Hakimeh, Iran

- Location within Iran
- Country: Iran
- Region: Kohgiluyeh and Boyer-Ahmad Province
- Offshore/onshore: Onshore
- Coordinates: 30°02′28″N 50°36′16″E
- Operators: NISOC
- Partners: NIOC

Field history
- Discovery: 1961
- Start of production: 1963

Production
- Current production of oil: 120,000 barrels per day (~6.0×10^{6} t/a)
- Estimated oil in place: 14,500 million barrels (~1.98×10^{9} t)

The Bibi Hakimeh oil field is an oil field located in Bibi Hakimeh, Kohgiluyeh and Boyer-Ahmad Province, Iran. The field lies 210 kilometres (130 mi) southeast of Ahvaz. It was discovered in 1961, and it has produced oil since 1963. In 2018, it produced 120,000 barrels per day (19,000 m^{3}/d) of oil. The field is owned by state-owned National Iranian Oil Company (NIOC) and operated by National Iranian South Oil Company (NISOC).

== See also ==
- List of oil fields
