= National Iranian Gas Company =

State-owned natural gas distribution company

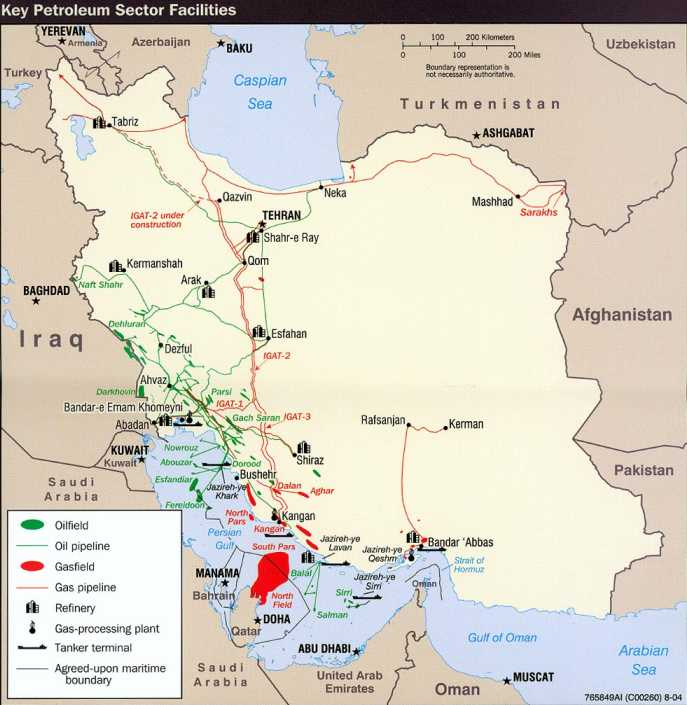
Iran's gas reserves are 15% of the world's total. Iran is a founding member of the Gas Exporting Countries Forum.

The National Iranian Gas Company (NIGC) was established in 1965 as one of the four principal companies affiliated to the Ministry of Petroleum of the Islamic Republic of Iran with 25,000 million Rials initial capital.

NIGC is responsible for the treatment, transmission, and delivery of natural gas to the domestic, industrial, and commercial sectors and power plants. The National Iranian Gas Exports Company (NIGEC) was created in 2003 to manage and to supervise all gas pipeline and LNG projects. Until May 2010, NIGEC was under the control of the NIOC, but the Petroleum Ministry transferred NIGEC, incorporating it under NIGC in an attempt to broaden responsibility for new natural gas projects. As at 2012, 12,750 villages have been connected to gas network. NIGC does not play a role in awarding upstream gas projects; that task remains in the hands of the National Iranian Oil Company. Iran has the largest gas network in the Middle East with 22,000 kilometres (14,000 mi) of high-pressure pipelines.

== Main subsidiaries ==
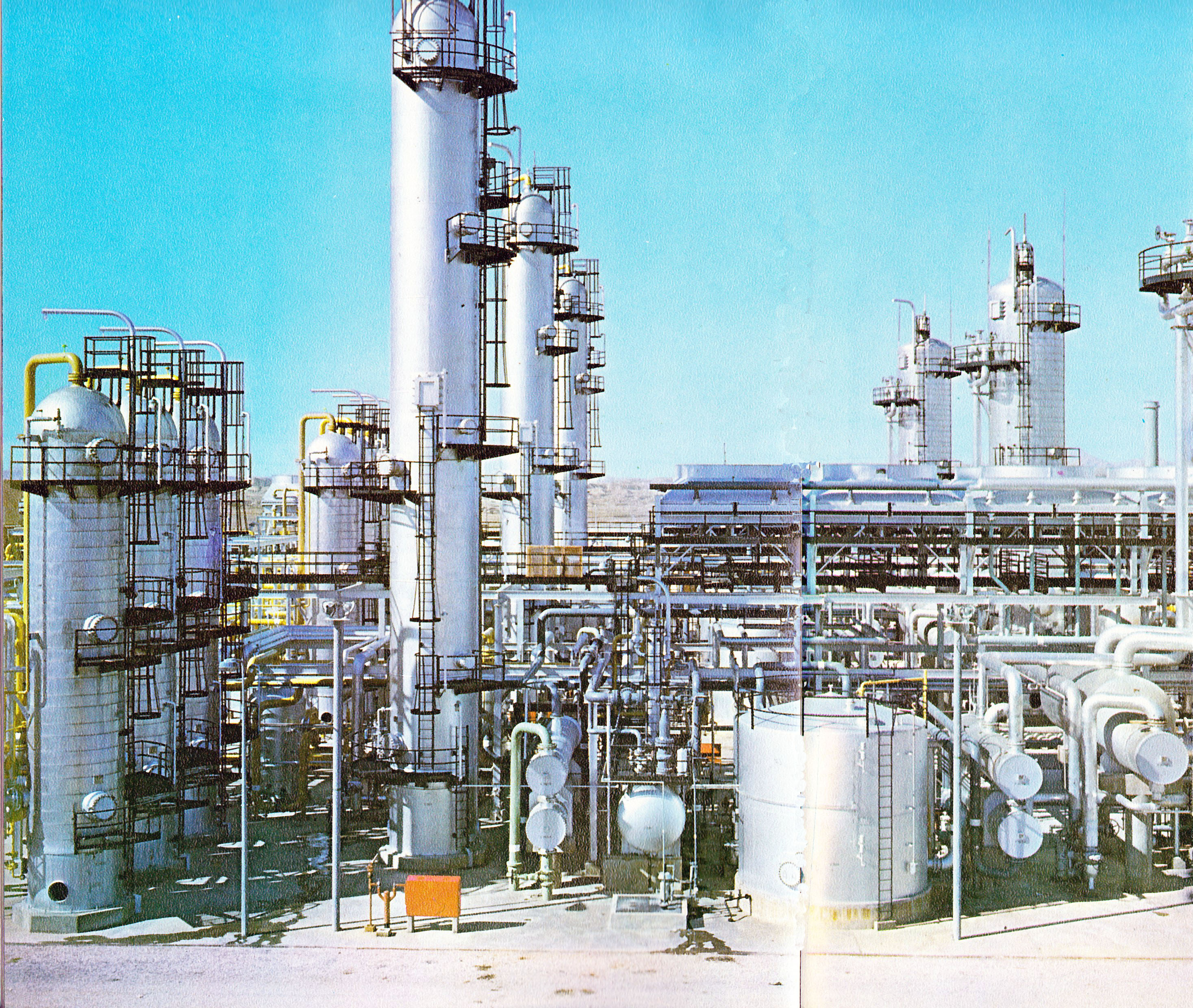
Bidboland gas refinery

Domestic Natural Gas Consumption by Sector - 2012
1. Power Plants (29.0%)
2. Residential (28.0%)
3. Industries (26.0%)
4. Transportation (5.00%)
5. Petrochemicals (4.00%)
6. Commercial (4.00%)
7. Other (4.00%)

The NIGC subsidiaries are:

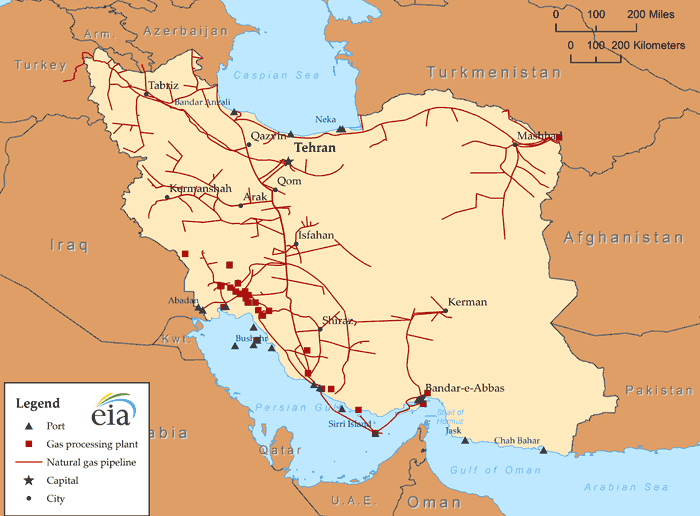
Iran - Natural gas infrastructure

- Iranian Gas Engineering and Development Company
- Iranian Gas Transmission Company
- Iranian Underground Gas Storage Company
- Iranian Gas Distribution Company
- Iranian Gas Commerce Company
- National Iranian Gas Export Company
- Provincial Gas Companies
- Gas Refining Companies

== Technology ==
Iran is able to produce all the parts needed for its gas refineries. Iran plans to export its first LNG cargo by 2013. Iran is expected to launch its first gas to liquids (GTL) plant by 2018.

== Development ==
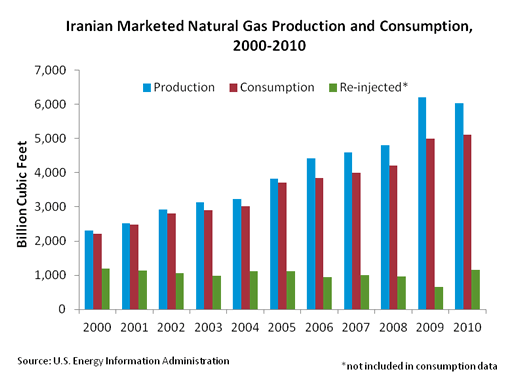
Iranian marketed natural gas production and consumption (2000–2010).

In 2011, Iran's net export of gas in 2010 was 1.57 billion cubic metres. In 2010, Iran's exports and imports of natural gas were 8.42 and 6.85 billion cubic metres respectively. In 2010, Iran exported 0.4, 0.25, and 7.77 billion cubic metres of gas to Armenia, Azerbaijan and Turkey respectively. In terms of imports, Iran has received 0.35 and 6.5 billion cubic metres from Azerbaijan and Turkmenistan respectively.

Iran has approximately 29.6 trillion cubic meters of proven gas reserves which accounts for 16% of the world's total reserves. This places Iran behind Russia with the second largest gas reserves worldwide. In 2009, Iran's natural gas production stood at 116 billion cubic metres. In 2010, this number rose to 138.5 billion cubic metres which shows a 19% increase. Iran plans to boost its natural gas production by 200 million cubic meters until March 2016. Most of Iran's gas is consumed domestically and has been increasing at an average annual rate of 12% for the past 15 years. Iran is seeking to reach a capacity of one million bpd of GTL-derived gasoline within the next decade.

In 2011, Iran signed a contract worth $10 billion with Baghdad and Damascus in order to export Iran's gas to Iraq, Syria, Lebanon, the Mediterranean region and eventually Europe. It is estimated that in the next three to four years there will be an excess production of 200-250 million cubic metres of gas in the South Pars gas field, the largest worldwide gas field located in Persian Gulf.

The liquefied natural gas (LNG) storage facility built in 2014 and named "Shourijeh" can supply 4.8 billion cubic metres of natural gas and aims to reduce gas imports from Turkmenistan.

== See also ==
- The nationalization of the Iran oil industry movement
- Aghajari Gas Injection Project
- Iran Natural Gas Reserves
  - South Pars Gas Field
  - North Pars Gas Field
  - Golshan Gas Field
  - Ferdowsi Gas Field
  - Kish Gas Field
  - Persian LNG
  - Iran LNG
- Rhum gasfield
