= National Iranian Tanker Company =

Subsidiary of National Iranian Oil Company

National Iranian Tanker Company (NITC)
- Type: Publicly traded limited company
- Industry: Oil tanker shipping
- Founded: 1955; 71 years ago
- Headquarters: Tehran, Iran
- Key people: Masoud Bazouee (CEO)
- Parent: National Iranian Oil Company

The National Iranian Tanker Company (NITC, Persian: شرکت ملی نفتکش ایران, Sherkat-e Meli-ye Naftkesh-e Iran) is a subsidiary of the National Iranian Oil Company, which was privatized in 2009. As of 2011, NITC was owned by funds managing pensions for 5 million Iranians. It is the biggest tanker company in the Middle East. The company transports Iranian crude oil to export markets and also engages in cross-trading of crude oil cargoes for some 150 oil majors worldwide, including Royal Dutch Shell, TotalEnergies, Saudi Aramco and state-run producers in Kuwait and Abu Dhabi. NITC has a capacity of 11 million tons per year.

== Facts and figures ==
- NITC's revenues during the last Iranian year (ended March 20, 2009) reached $1.5 billion. 51 percent of the revenues came from Europe, 26 percent from Asia, 15 percent from Africa and 8 percent from other parts of the world, including Canada, Venezuela and Latin America.
- NITC observes International Maritime Organization regulations. NITC has been awarded ISO 9002, ISO 14001 (for management), PMS (for maintenance and repair system), STCW (for maritime supervision systems) and ISMC (for maritime safety management).
- Iran pumps about 4mn barrels per day to world markets, with roughly 60% bound for Asia and the remaining headed to Europe (2008).
- In 2008, NITC transferred 103 million tons of petroleum products abroad.
- As of 2015, Iran has 42 very large crude carriers or VLCCs, each able to carry 2 million barrels of oil.

=== Fleet ===
As at 2010, the company operated 28 Very Large Crude Carriers (VLCC), nine Suezmax and five Aframax tankers. It also owns three chemical vessels and a liquefied petroleum gas (LPG) carrier. As of January 2011, NITC has 46 tankers with an annual capacity of 10.6 million tons to be increase to 12.5 million tons by the end of the year. As at 2012, NITC with 40 tankers of 100,000 to 300,000 tons, does not have the long-distance capacity for more than 2 million barrels (300,000 tons) a day in exports.

==== List of tankers ====
- Sabiti
- Marshall Z
- Pacific Bravo
- Latin Venture

SONIA

==== Expansion ====
NITC has a huge project for replacing tankers, including the construction and purchase of 25 tankers with a total capacity of 6 million tons. In 2009, Iran and South Korea's Daewoo signed a $128-million contract on tanker supply with a capacity to carry 2.1 million barrels of crude. The state-owned enterprise says it has ordered 16 other oil tankers that will join its current fleet of 45 carriers by 2011.

NITC expects by 2013 to have 74 ships of all sizes, including very large crude carriers, or VLCCs, and also smaller vessels. NITC will operate 50 VLCCs at that time, up from 28 in 2010. As at 2011, NITC ranks as the fifth-biggest tanker operator worldwide, with a total of 43 ships. Over the next two decades, Iran would need 500 new ships, including 120 oil tankers, 40 liquefied natural gas (LNG) carriers and over 300 commercial vessels.

In 2009 in a move aimed at further enhancing Iran's shipbuilding industry, President Mahmoud Ahmadinejad said he will ban the purchase of foreign ships by Iranian organizations.

==== Role during US sanctions ====
In May 2018, when the Trump administration re-imposed sanctions against Iran after the US withdrawal from the JCPOA, China shifted its petroleum cargo to ships owned by the NITC to maintain or even increase its imports from Iran. It was not immediately clear which entities would provide insurance for those shipments worth $1.5 billion a month. Zhuhai Zhenrong Corp and Sinopec Group have activated a business clause in their long term supply agreement with NIOC, and likely Iran will cover all the costs and risks, including insurance, for the delivery of the crude.

== See also ==
- Transport in Iran
- International rankings of Iran in Transport
- IRISL Group
