= Consortium Agreement of 1954 =

Oil agreement

The Consortium Agreement of 1954 (Persian: قرارداد کنسرسیوم) provided Western oil companies with 50% ownership of Iranian oil production after its ratification in 1954 expiring in 1979. According to the consortium agreement, 40% of Iran's oil shares belonged to 5 American companies, the other 40% belonged to Iran-UK oil companies, 14% belonged to a Dutch oil company, and the remaining 6% belonged to a French oil company. In spite of numerous negotiations and offers, Mohammad Reza Shah refused to extend the Agreement which originally and clearly postulated that the Consortium had the right to prolong it 15 years (3 times 5 years).

== History ==
A year after the overthrow of Premier Mohammad Mossadegh by the United States and the United Kingdom in the 1953 Iranian coup d'état, the British and American governments began pressuring the reinstated Shah of Iran into negotiations with Britain over the ownership of the Anglo-Persian Oil Company. The British cabinet had imposed a series of economic sanctions on Iran that prohibited the export of key commodities to Iran. Britain's boycott had become devastatingly effective, with Iranians "becoming poorer and unhappier by the day."

== Terms ==
The dispute was finalized with the incorporation of a 25-year international Oil Consortium Agreement of 1954, dividing the aforementioned 50% foreign ownership as follows: 40% to be divided equally (8% each) between five major American companies (Exxon, Mobil, Standard Oil of California, Texaco, and Gulf); 40% for British Petroleum; Royal Dutch/Shell to have 14%; and 6% for Compagnie française des pétroles (CFP), a French company. A year later in 1955 US-government ordered the 5 US-companies to each transfer 1% of their 8%, to several smaller companies because these companies had complained that 'they were left out'.

The agreement further stipulates that the Consortium would take care of (almost) all production, refining, transport, and international marketing for Iranian oil, for which purposes two Dutch legal entities—the Iranian Oil Refining Company and the Iranian Oil Exploration and Producing Company—were to be created.

Basing these companies in Great Britain, and BP's initial wish for a 50% share, were considered too offensive to the Iranians. Furthermore, BP had strong connections with the 6% holding CFP; with BP holding 40%, the two companies had less than half of the foreign owned share between them.

== Aftermath ==
The agreement, which was heavily pressured by President Eisenhower, gave American oil companies significant influence over how much petroleum Iran pumped and the price it could sell for. Beginning in 1973, the Shah faced increasing tensions with Western nations after announcing he would not renew the consortium agreement upon its expiration and planned to nationalize Iranian oil in 1979. The Shah, speaking to 5,000 farmers and workers, accused the oil companies of mishandling operations under the 1954 agreement. He said he had ordered the National Iranian Oil Company to start hiring foreign experts to work with Iranians so the company could take over the consortium's duties “either immediately or from 1979.”

Many Iranians accuse Western nations of supporting the overthrow of the Shah due to his failure to renew the consortium agreement in 1979 in what is known as the 1979 Iranian Revolution conspiracy theory. According to the New York Times, the oil companies, through a spokesman, argued that the Shah did not have a legal right to end their contract in 1979, because the Consortium had the right of prolonging it for 15 years.

== 1973 Sale and Purchase Agreement ==
In the early 1970s, the shah said that if the Consortium refused to overhaul the terms of the 1954 Agreement, it would not be extended at the end of the twenty-five-year period by 1979. Representatives of the Consortium member companies started negotiations with the shah in the winter of 1972 in St. Maurice, and presented a treaty known as the St. Maurice Document. Negotiations continued between the National Oil Company and representatives of the consortium in early 1973 and finally a new contract, called the "Sales and Purchase Agreement", was signed on June 31, 1973, and became law after the approval of the legislative bodies in Iran on July 31, 1973.

According to this agreement, which was to take effect on March 21, 1973 and remain in force for twenty years, the National Iranian Oil Company retained ownership of oil facilities and reserves and gained full control over operations in the oil industry. These included exploration, development, investment, production, refining, and the transport of crude oil, gas, and petroleum products. The Consortium became only buyers of oil and privileged customers of the National Iranian Oil Company.

== Ending ==
The Consortium was ended completely following the Iranian Revolution in 1979, with the assets of all foreign oil companies operating in Iran seized and their employees expelled.
