= National Iranian Oil Company =

Oil and gas company of Iran

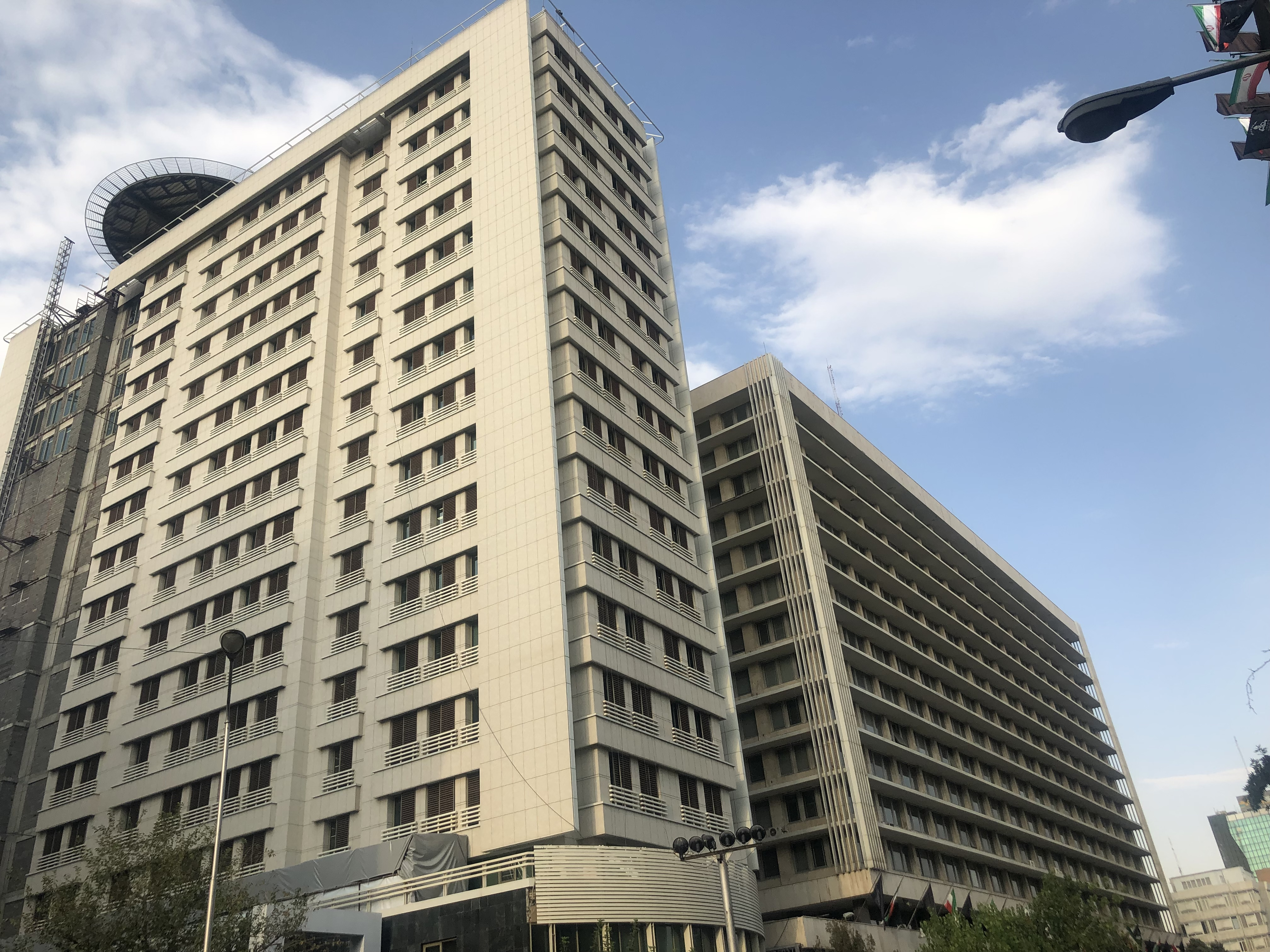
- National Iranian Oil Company headquarters
- Type: State-owned enterprise
- Industry: Oil and gas
- Predecessor: Anglo-Persian Oil Company
- Founded: 20 March 1951; 75 years ago
- Founder: Government of Iran: The Majles; Mohammad Mosaddegh (later Prime Minister)
- Headquarters: Taleghani Street, Tehran, Iran
- Area served: Worldwide
- Key people: Hamid Bovard (Chairman); Farrokh Alikhani (CEO)
- Products: Petroleum; Natural gas; Motor fuels; Aviation fuels; Petrochemicals
- Revenue: ▲US$53 billion (2023)
- Total assets: ▲US$200 billion (2023)
- Owner: Iranian government (100%)
- Number of employees: 87,500 (2018)
- Parent: Ministry of Petroleum
- Subsidiaries: NISOC; IOOC; ICOFC; NIDC; NICO; NITCO
- Website: en.nioc.ir

The National Iranian Oil Company (NIOC; Persian: شرکت ملّی نفت ایران, romanized: Sherkat-e Melli-ye Naft-e Irān) is a government-owned national oil and natural gas producer and distributor under the direction of the Ministry of Petroleum of Iran. NIOC was established in 1951 and restructured under The Consortium Agreement of 1954. NIOC ranks as the world's second largest oil company, after Saudi Arabia's state-owned Aramco.

The NIOC is exclusively responsible for the exploration, drilling, production, distribution and export of crude oil, as well as exploration, extraction and sales of natural gas and liquefied natural gas (LNG). NIOC exports its surplus production according to commercial considerations determined by the OPEC and at the prices prevalent in the international markets. In early 2015 NIOC's recoverable liquid hydrocarbon reserves was 156.53 billion barrels (24.886 km^{3}) (10% of world's total) and recoverable gas reserves were 33.79×10^{12} m^{3} (15% of world's total). As of 2012, the NIOC production capacity included over 4 million barrels (640×10^{3} m^{3}) of crude oil and in excess of 750 million cubic meters of natural gas per day.

In 2024, the National Iranian Oil Company was responsible for 1,208 Mt of CO_{2} emissions, which was 3.13% of global CO_{2} emissions.

Flag of the National Iranian Oil Company

== History ==
=== Background: 1901–1951 ===
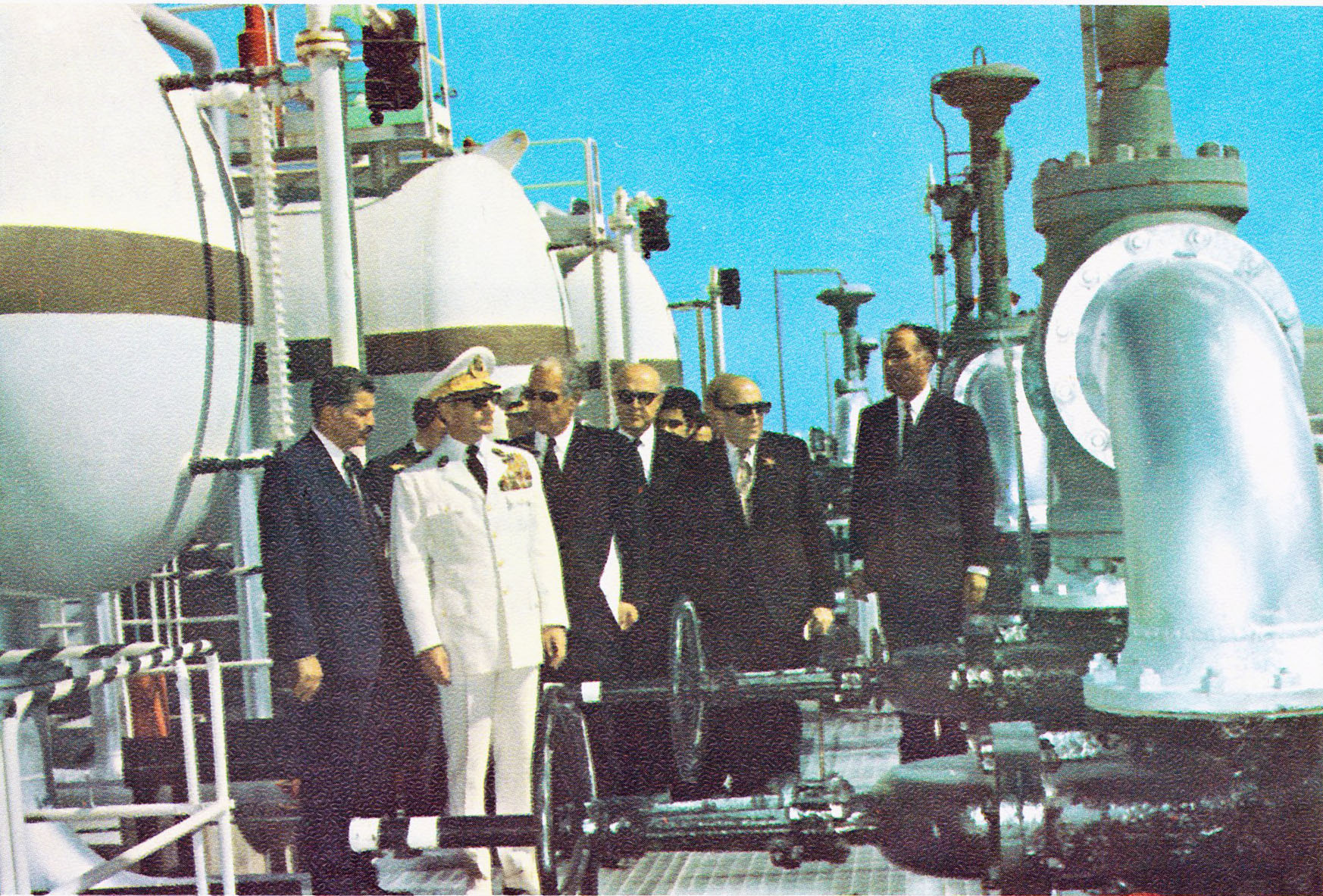
The Shah opens the facilities of International Naval Oil Company of Iran in 1970

In May 1901, William Knox D'Arcy was granted a concession by Mozaffar ad-Din Shah Qajar to search for oil, which he discovered in May 1908. This was the first commercially significant find in the Middle East. In 1923, Burmah Oil employed future Prime Minister, Winston Churchill as a paid consultant; to lobby the British government to allow the Anglo-Persian Oil Company (APOC) to have exclusive rights to Persian oil resources, which were successfully granted.

In 1935, Rezā Shāh requested the international community to refer to Persia as 'Iran', which was reflected in the name change of the Anglo-Persian Oil Company (APOC) to the Anglo-Iranian Oil Company (AIOC). Following World War II, Iranian nationalism was on the rise, especially surrounding the Iranian natural resources being exploited by the foreign companies without adequately compensating Iranian taxpayers. AIOC and the pro western Iranian government led by Prime Minister Ali Razmara, initially resisted nationalist pressure to revise AIOC's concession terms still further in Iran's favour. In March 1951, Ali Razmara was assassinated; and Mohammed Mossadeq, a nationalist, was elected as the new prime minister by the Majlis of Iran.

=== NIOC: 1951–1979 ===
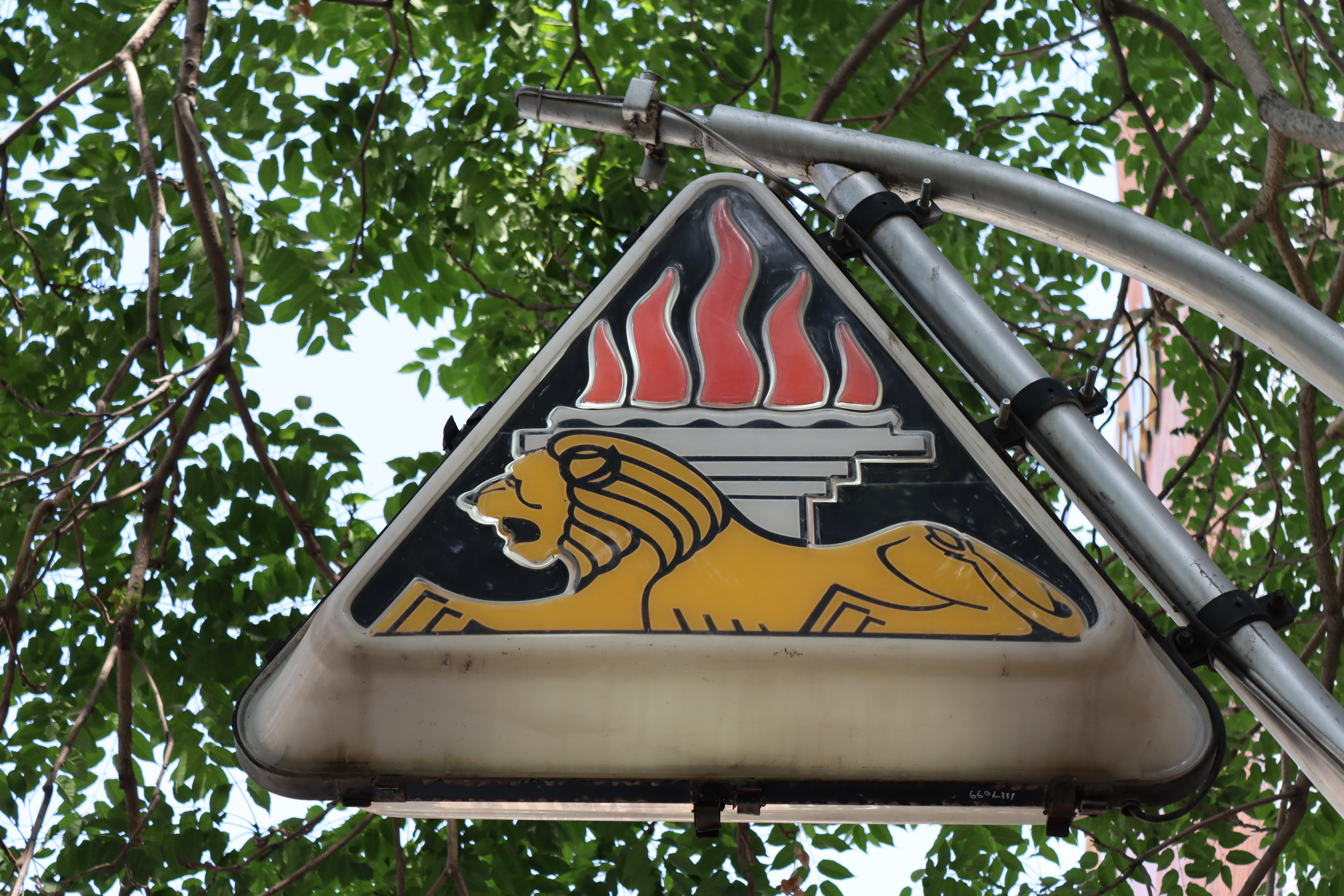
Emblem of NIOC from the 1950s to the 1970s

In April 1951, the Majlis nationalized the Iranian oil industry by a unanimous vote, and the National Iranian Oil Company (NIOC) was formed, displacing the AIOC. The AIOC withdrew its management from Iran and organised an effective worldwide embargo of Iranian oil. The British government, which owned the AIOC, contested the nationalization at the International Court of Justice at The Hague, but its complaint was dismissed.

By the spring of 1953, incoming US President Dwight D. Eisenhower authorised the Central Intelligence Agency (CIA), to organise a coup against the Mossadeq government, the 1953 Iranian coup d'état. In August 1953, the coup brought pro-Western general Fazlollah Zahedi to power as the new PM, along with the return to Iran of the Shah Mohammad Reza Pahlavi from his brief exile in Italy. The anti-Mossadeq plan was orchestrated by the CIA under the code-name Operation Ajax, and by the British SIS (MI6) as Operation Boot.

In 1954, the AIOC became British Petroleum. The return of the shah had not meant that British Petroleum was able to monopolise Iranian oil as before. Under pressure from United States, British Petroleum reluctantly accepted membership in a consortium of companies, founded in October 1954, to bring back Iranian oil to the international market. It was incorporated in London as a holding company called Iranian Oil Participants (IOP). The founding members of IOP included British Petroleum (40%), Gulf (later Chevron, 8%), Royal Dutch Shell (14%), and Compagnie Française des Pétroles (later Total, 6%). The four Aramco partners – Standard Oil of California (SoCal, later Chevron) – Standard Oil of New Jersey (later Exxon, then ExxonMobil) – Standard Oil Co. of New York (later Mobil, then ExxonMobil) – Texaco (later Chevron) – each held an 8% stake in the holding company.

All IOP members acknowledged that NIOC owned the oil and facilities in Iran, and IOP's role was to operate and manage them on behalf of NIOC. To facilitate that, IOP established two operating entities incorporated in the Netherlands, and both were delegated to NIOC. Similar to the Saudi-Aramco "50/50" agreement of 1950, the IOP consortium agreed to share profits on a 50–50 basis with Iran, "but not to open its books to Iranian auditors or to allow Iranians onto its board of directors". The negotiations leading to the creation of the consortium, during 1954–55, were considered a feat of skillful diplomacy.

In Iran, IOP continued to operate until the Islamic Revolution in 1979. The new regime of Ayatollah Khomeini confiscated all of the company's assets in Iran. According to the NIOC: The victory of the Islamic revolution annulled the Consortium Agreement of 1954 and all regulations pertaining to it. The revolution led to the withdrawal or expulsion of virtually all foreign employees from the oil industry with the new Iranian government assuming full control of its affairs.

== Oil reserves ==
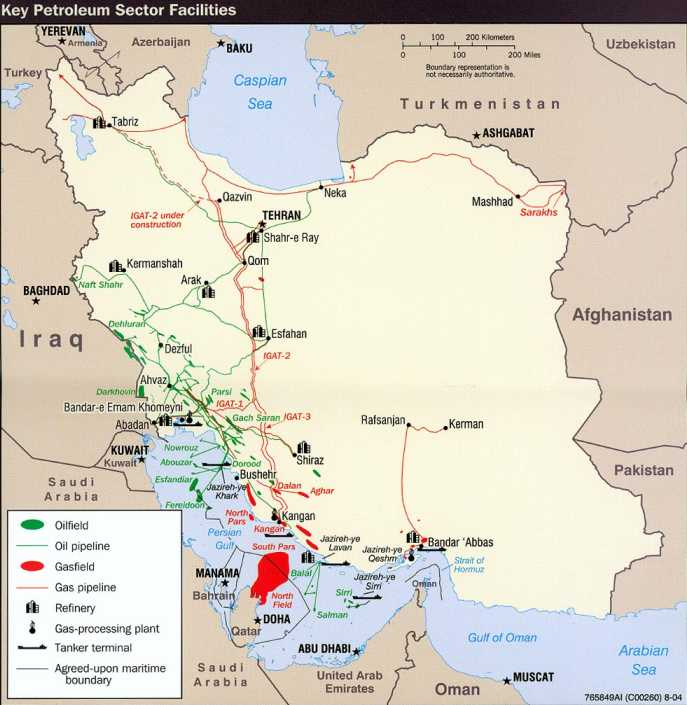
Iranian oil and gas fields, infrastructure

Iran oil production, domestic consumption and exports

According to OPEC, NIOC recoverable liquid hydrocarbon reserves at the end of 2006 was 1,384 billion barrels (2.200×10^{11} m^{3}).

NIOC oil reserves at the beginning of 2001 was reported to be about 99 billion barrels (1.57×10^{10} m^{3}), however in 2002 the result of NIOC's study showed huge reserves upgrade adding about 317 billion barrels (5.04×10^{10} m^{3}) of recoverable reserves to the Iranian oil reserves.

After 2003 Iran made some significant discoveries which led to addition of another 7.7 billion barrels (1.22×10^{9} m^{3}) of oil to the recoverable reserves of Iran.

The vast majority of Iran's crude oil reserves are located in giant onshore fields in the south-western Khuzestan region near the Iraqi border. Overall, Iran has 40 producing fields – 27 onshore and 13 offshore. Iran's crude oil is generally medium in sulfur and in the 28°-35 °API range.

As of 2012, 98 rigs are in operation in onshore fields, 24 in offshore fields and a single rig is in operation in the Caspian Sea. Iran plans to increase the number of its drilling rigs operating in its onshore and offshore oilfields by 36 units to reach 134 units by March 2014.

Table 1- The biggest NIOC oil fields;

| Rank | Field Name | Formation | Oil in Place (Billion Barrels) | Recoverable Reserves (Billion Barrels) | Production Thousand barrels per day |
|---|---|---|---|---|---|
| 1 | Ahvaz Field | Asmari & Bangestan | 65.5 | 25.5 | 945 |
| 2 | Gachsaran Field | Asmari & Bangestan | 52.9 | 16.2 | 480 |
| 3 | Marun Field | Asmari | 46.7 | 21.9 | 520 |
| 4 | Azadegan oil field | Bangestan & Khami | 33.2 | 5.4 | 70 |
| 5 | Aghajari Field | Asmari & Bangestan | 30.2 | 17.4 | 300 |
| 6 | Rag Sefid oil field | Asmari & Bangestan | 16.5 | 4.49 | 180 |
| 7 | Abteymour oil field | Bangestan | 15.2 | 2.6 | 60 |
| 8 | Soroush Oil Field | Asmari & Bangestan | 14.2 | 9.1 | 46 |
| 9 | Karanj Oil Field | Asmari & Bangestan | 11.2 | 5.7 | 230 |
| 10 | Bibi Hakimeh oil field | Asmari & Bangestan | 7.59 | 5.6 | 120 |

Largest Iranian Oil Fields by Production
| Field's Name | Thousand barrels per day | Thousand cubic meters per day |
(onshore)
| Ahvaz Field | 750 | 119 |
| Marun Field | 520 | 83 |
| Gachsaran Field | 480 | 76 |
| Aghajari Field | 300 | 48 |
| Karanj Oil Field | 200 | 32 |
| Rag Safid Oil Field | 180 | 29 |
| Bibi Hakimeh Oil Field | 130 | 21 |
| Darquin Oil Field | 100 | 16 |
| Pazanan Oil Field | 70 | 11 |
(offshore)
| Dorood Oil Field | 130 | 21 |
| Salman Field | 130 | 21 |
| Abuzar Oil Field | 125 | 19.9 |
| Sirri Oil Field | 95 | 15.1 |
| Soroush Field | 60 | 9.5 |

=== Strategic petroleum reserves ===
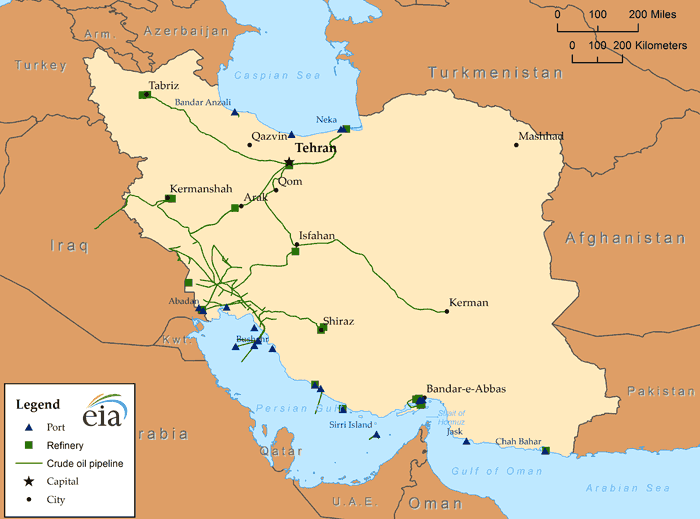
Iran – Oil infrastructure

Iran began in 2006 with plans to create a global strategic petroleum reserve with the construction of 15 crude oil storage tanks with a planned capacity of 10 million barrels (1,600,000 m^{3}). The storage capacity of oil products in the country is around 11.5 billion liters (2011), but it will reach 16.7 billion liters by the end of the Fifth Five Year Development Plan (2010–2015). As of 2012, Iran is capable of storing crude oil in the Persian Gulf for a period of 10–12 days. The figure should hit 30–40 days after the construction of new storage facilities are completed.

== Gas reserves ==
NIOC holds about 1,000×10^{12} cu ft (28,000 km^{3}) of proven Natural gas reserves of which 36% are as associated gas and 64% is in non-associated gas fields. It stands for world's second largest reserves after Russia.

NIOC's ten biggest Non-Associated Gas Fields;

NIOC's ten biggest Non-Associated Gas Fields.
| Field's Name | Gas in Place Tcf | Recoverable Reserve Tcf |
|---|---|---|
| South Pars | 500 | 322 |
| North Pars | 60 | 47 |
| Kish Gas Field | 60 | 45 |
| Golshan Gas Field | 55 | 25–45 |
| Tabnak Gas Field | NA | 21,2 |
| Kangan Gas Field | NA | 20,1 |
| Khangiran Gas Field | NA | 16,8 |
| Nar Gas Field | NA | 13 |
| Aghar Gas Field | NA | 11,6 |
| Farsi Field | NA | 11–22 |

== Recent discoveries ==
Since 1995, National Iranian Oil Company (NIOC) has made significant oil and gas discoveries, standing for some 84-billion-barrels (1.34×10^{10} m^{3}) of oil in place and at least 175×10^{12} cu ft (5,000 km^{3}) of gas in place, which are listed below.

NIOC Oil Discoveries Since 1995.
| Field's name | Oil in Place (billion barrels) | Recoverable oil (billion barrels) | Discovery year |
|---|---|---|---|
| Azadegan Oil Field | 33.2 | 5.2 | |
| Yadavaran Oil Field | 17 | 3 | |
| Ramin Oil Field | 7.398 | 1.11 | 2007 |
| South Pars Oil Layer | 6 | NA | |
| Band-E-Karkeh Oil Field | 4.5 | NA | 2007 |
| MansourAbad Oil Field | 4.45 | NA | 2007 |
| Changoleh Oil Field | 2.7 | NA | |
| Azar Oil Field | 2.07 | NA | 2007 |
| Paranj Oil Field | 1.6 | NA | 2007 |
| Balaroud Oil Field | 1.1 | 0.233 | 2007 |
| Binalood Oil Field | 0.776 | 0.099 | 2008 |
| Mansouri Oil Field | 0.760 | NA | |
| Jofeyr Oil Field | 0.750 | NA | 2008 |
| Asaluyeh Oil Field | 0.525 | NA | 2008 |
| Arvand Oil Field | 0.500 | NA | 2008 |
| Tusan Oil Field | 0.470 | NA | 2006 |
| Arash Gas Field | 0.168 | NA | |
| Total | 83.967 | NA | |

NIOC Natural Gas Discoveries Since 1995.
| Field's name | Gas in place | | Recoverable gas reserve | |
| Field's name | Trillion cubic feet | Billion cubic meters | Trillion cubic feet | Billion cubic meters |
|---|---|---|---|---|
| Kish Gas Field | 59 | 1,700 | 47 | 1,300 |
| Tabnak Gas Field | 30 | 850 | NA | |
| Farsi Gas Field | NA | | 11–23 | 310–650 |
| Sefid Zakhur Gas Field | 11.4 | 320 | 8.5 | 240 |
| Yadavaran Field | 9.75 | 276 | NA | |
| Lavan Gas Field | 9.1 | 260 | NA | |
| Balal Gas Field | 8.8 | 250 | NA | |
| Homa Gas Field | 7.6 | 220 | NA | |
| Marun Field | 6.2 | 180 | NA | |
| Gardan Gas Field | 5.7 | 160 | NA | |
| Day Gas Field | 4.4 | 120 | NA | |
| Binak Field | 3.5 | 99 | NA | |
| Karanj Gas Field | 2.9 | 82 | NA | |
| Bibi Hakime Oil Field | 2.4 | 68 | NA | |
| Zireh Gas Field | 1 | 28 | NA | |
| Masjed Soleiman Field | 1 | 28 | 0.739 | 20.9 |
| Arash Gas Field | 0.79 | 22 | NA | |
| KheyrAbad Gas Field | 0.17 | 4.8 | NA | |
| Total | 170 | 4,800 | NA | |

== Organizational structure ==
The company is completely owned by Iranian government. NIOC's General Assembly (GA) consists of:

- The President
- Vice President
- Director General of the Management and Planning Organization
- Minister of Petroleum
- Minister of Energy
- Minister of Industries and Mines
- Minister of Labor and Social Affairs
- Minister of Economy and Finance

=== Members of the board ===
| Name | Position | Board's Position |
|---|---|---|
| Javad Owji | Minister of Petroleum | Chairman |
| Mohsen Khojastemehr | CEO | Vice Chairman |
| Ahmad Mohammadi | CEO of NISOC | Member of the board |
| Karim Zobeidi | Manager of Integrated Planning | Member of the board |
| Saeed Khoshrou | Manager of International Affairs | Member of the board |
| Mohammad Bilkar | Director of Finance | Member of the board |
| Seyyed Saleh Hendi | Exploration Manager | Member of the board |

== Subsidiary companies ==
The NIOC's subsidiaries are as follows:

NIOC subsidiaries
| Company name | Activities |
|---|---|
| Iranian Offshore Oil Company (IOOC) | in charge of offshore oil fields in the Persian Gulf offshore oil and gas fields with the exception of South Pars. It focuses mainly on production platforms, ancillary facilities, and installations. Massive corruption in the lease of offshore platforms reported by the Iranian media in 2015. |
| Iranian Central Oil Fields Company (ICOFC) | supervises all upstream activities in the central oil and gas regions of the country, i.e. everything, excluding the oil-rich southern Khuzestan province, Caspian and offshore. As of 2015, it is the largest natural gas producer in Iran. |
| National Iranian Gas Export Co. (NIGEC) | in charge of gas exports for the National Iranian Gas Company. Until May 2010, NIGEC was under the control of the NIOC, but the Petroleum Ministry transferred NIGEC, incorporating it under NIGC in an attempt to broaden responsibility for new natural gas projects. See also: Persian pipeline and Peace pipeline. |
| National Iranian South Oil Company (NISOC) | in charge of onshore oilfields in southern Iran. Focuses on onshore upstream activity in the province of Khuzestan. As Khuzestan is the main oil and gas-producing province, this entity is among the most significant in the NIOC family. It produces approximately 80 percent of all crude oil produced in Iran. |
| Khazar Oil Exploration and Production Company | in charge of Iran's Caspian Sea sector (onshore and offshore) |
| Karoon Oil and Gas Production Company (KOGPC) | Operating in Khouzestan, the company operates 538 wells and delivers natural gas to NIGC. |
| Petroleum Engineering and Development Company (PEDEC) | is the most important NIOC offshoot company. The responsibility for all buy-back projects under operation, study or negotiation has been given to PEDEC. This company enjoys full authority to manage the projects. Further information: Foreign Direct Investment in Iran |
| Pars Oil and Gas Company (POGC) | National Iranian Gas Company does not play a role in awarding upstream gas projects; that task remains in the hands of the National Iranian Oil Company. Pars Oil and Gas Co. is in charge of the offshore North and South Pars gas fields and responsible for awarding the contracts for the different phases. Since 2010, it has been raising capital on the domestic and international markets in order to finance its projects. |
| South Pars Company | South Pars Gas Company is responsible for the refineries of the South Pars on shore, while POGC operates the platforms of the field, offshore. |
| Pars Special Economic Energy Zone Co. | handles and organizes all activities in the Pars Special Economic-Energy Zone, located near the South Pars gas field (a subsidiary of Pars Oil & Gas Co.) |
| Iranian Oil Terminals Company | has four transport hubs including facilities on the three islands of Kharg, Lavan and Sirri consisting of 17 jetties capable of berthing tankers of all sizes to lift and export its crude oil that load more than 2,000 oil tankers per year. 2,000 of them dock in Bandar Abbas Port, 1,000 in Khark Island. Iran earned nearly $2 billion in 2009 from bunkering ships in the Persian Gulf (25% market share). Projected bunkering sites by 2015: Bandar Abbas (two sites), Kish, Qeshm, Bushehr, Mahshahr, Assalouyeh, Khark and Chabahar. Fujairah bunkering hub, UAE is Iran's main competitor in the Persian Gulf. The country's terminal storage capacity should soar to 100 million barrels by 2015 from the current 24 million barrels. |
| National Iranian Drilling Company (NIDC) | in charge of all offshore and onshore drilling activities. NIDC provides more than 90 percent of drilling services needed by the oil companies inside the country. In 2011, NIDC, drilled or completed 192 oil and gas wells, drilled 454 thousand meters of wells and provided more than 8 thousand expert or technical services to customers. As at 2012, 123 drilling rigs are in operation in Iran's offshore and onshore. |
| Ahwaz Pipe Mills Company | manufacturing oil and gas pipes and has a capacity of up to 420,000 tons per year. It operates three plants. |
| Iranian Fuel Conservation Organization | regimenting the fuel consumption in different sectors through review and survey of the current trend of consumption and executing conservation measures nationwide. See also: 2007 Gasoline Rationing Plan in Iran |
| National Iranian Tanker Company | controls the second largest fleet of tankers in OPEC. Despite having domestic manufacturing capacity, NITC purchases many VLCC abroad (e.g. China) for unknown reasons. |
| Exploration Service Company (ESC) | responsible for providing operational services in all facets of exploration and production activities within NIOC onshore regions. |
| Kala Naft (London) Ltd. | in charge of carrying out the procurement needs of the NIOC that cannot be met domestically. However, NIOC organizations can in theory also purchase directly from suppliers. |
| Kala Naft (Canada) Ltd. | in charge of carrying out the procurement needs of the NIOC that cannot be met domestically |
| Naftiran Intertrade Co. (NICO) (Switzerland) | handles trading & swaps operations on behalf of NIOC. Iran has swap arrangements with Azerbaijan, Turkmenistan, and Kazakhstan, under which it ships crude from the Central Asian producers to its Caspian ports in Neka. In exchange Iran delivers the equivalent barrels of crude on behalf of the three Central Asian producers to their customers in the Persian Gulf. In October 2010, Iran asked for the terms of the contract to be re-negotiated because it claims it has lost money because of it. On 2 July 2011, NIOC resumed oil swaps with Caspian states. NaftIran also buys the vast majority of Iran's gasoline imports. Naftiran is a key player in Iran's energy sector. Naftiran also holds 25.77% stake in Madras Fertilizers Limited, an Indian PSU operating in Chennai. |
| Petropars | General contractor for the oil & gas industry (a subsidiary of Naftiran Intertrade Co.) |
| Petroiran Development Company (aka PetroIran or PEDCO) | General offshore contractor (a subsidiary of Naftiran Intertrade Co.). PetroIran was initially formed to be the Iranian partner of foreign contractors with a 10% share in each buy-back contract. |
| Iranian Oil Company (UK) | in charge of Rhum gasfield (a subsidiary of Naftiran Intertrade Co.) |
| Iranian Offshore Engineering and Construction Company (IOEC) | First Iranian general contractor to the oil and gas industries. Joint venture with IDRO |
| Arvandan Oil & Gas Company (AOGC) | responsible for the development of the Arvandan oil & gas fields. AOGC was established in 2004 working as the main operator in oil and gas production from Azadegan, Yadavaran, Darquain, Jufeyr, Moshtagh, Khorramshahr, Arvand, Susangerd, Band-e-Karkheh, Omid and other fields which are located in west of Karun River. |
| Research Institute of Petroleum Industry (RIPI) | NIOC will implement 69 research projects between 2010 and 2015 which include topics as enhancing recovery rate, modeling, control and management of reservoirs, production and exploitation, exploration, promotion and technology in drilling operations, establishment of an integrated data bank, industrial protection and environment, optimizing energy consumption, materials and equipments manufacturing, strategic and infrastructure studies, productivity and specialized maintenance. Iran is expected to launch its first gas to liquids (GTL) plant by 2018. As of 2019, NIOC was conducting 25 major research projects worth nearly 700 billion rials (about $16 million). As of 2019, 300 knowledge-based companies were active in the field of oil industry in Iran. See also: Science and technology in Iran and Petroleum University of Technology. |

== Production costs and investments ==
The cost of producing each barrel will rise to $30 or more from $7 in 2012.

Iran currently allocates $20 billion a year to develop fields and $10 billion on maintaining output. In the next decade, maintaining production will cost $50 billion, with a similar sum required for development. This does not include development and investment costs in related fields such as Petrochemicals.

== NIOC's major domestic contractors ==
Although usually neglected and overlooked, Iran also has a number of very active private companies in the oil sector. The growing private sector activity is mainly active in projects involving the construction of oil field units, refinery equipment, tanks and pipelines, as well as engineering. Iranian manufacturers will supply oil industry with $10 billion worth of domestically made goods and equipment in 2012.

NIOC produces 60–70% of its industrial equipment domestically including towers, reactors, various turbines, refineries, oil tankers, oil rigs, offshore platforms, valves, pipelines, generators and exploration instruments. Iran is also cooperating with foreign companies to transfer technology to Iranian oil industry. The objective is to become self-sufficient by 85% before 2015. The strategic goods include onshore and offshore drilling rigs, pumps, turbines and precision tools. Domestic production of 52 petrochemical catalysts will be started in 2013.

In 2019, the government sub-contracted projects worth 6.2 billion to domestic contractors. Pending projects include domestication of wellhead equipment, desalinating packages, anti-corrosions, sulfur recovery catalysts, wellhead control panels, among others. According to NIOC in 2019, Iran was manufacturing 12,000 components and complicated equipment of the petroleum industry.

In 2021, Iran announced that 820 domestic firms, including 182 knowledge-based, have manufactured 85% of the parts or equipments needed by the oil and gas sector, worth some $5 billion. The companies have generated some 80,000 and 250,000 jobs directly and indirectly, respectively.

== Participations in foreign gas fields ==
- Iran owns 50% of the offshore gas field of Rhum in the North Sea, which is Britain's largest untapped gas field. It is a joint-venture with BP worth $1 million a day at 15 June 2010 spot prices.
- Iran has another 10% joint-venture participation with BP and other foreign oil companies in Azerbaijani Shah Deniz gas field, producing 8 billion cubic meters of gas per year, worth up to a reported $2.4 billion per year. The Iranian entity with which BP has partnered in these ventures is the Swiss-based Naftiran Intertrade, a subsidiary company of the NIOC.

== Environmental record ==
According to geographer Richard Heede, is third on the list of companies with the highest level of CO_{2} emissions globally with 739 million tonnes (727,000,000 long tons; 815,000,000 short tons) in 2013, amounting to more than 3.1% of worldwide anthropogenic emissions.

== See also ==
- The nationalization of the Iran oil industry movement
- International rankings of Iran
- Petroleum industry in Iran
- Ministry of Petroleum of Iran
  - National Iranian Gas Company
  - National Iranian Petrochemical Company
  - National Iranian Oil Refining and Distribution Company
- Economy of Iran
- Iranian oil bourse
- Foreign Direct Investment in Iran
- Privatization in Iran
- Eilat Ashkelon Pipeline Company – used to be 50% in control of NIOC and the focus of a dispute between Israel and Iran.
- William Knox D'Arcy
