= National Iranian South Oil Company =

Iranian oil company

- Type: State-owned enterprise
- Industry: Oil and gas
- Founded: 1971
- Headquarters: Ahvaz, Iran
- Key people: Ramin Hatami (CEO)
- Products: Oil, natural gas and liquefied gases
- Owner: National Iranian Oil Company
- Number of employees: 19,000 (2012)
- Website: www.nisoc.ir

The National Iranian South Oilfields Company (NISOC) (Persian: شرکت ملی مناطق نفت‌خیز جنوب ایران, Sherkat-e Meliy-e Manateq-e Naftxiz-e Jonub-e Iran) is a government-owned corporation under the direction of the Ministry of Petroleum of Iran, and operates as a subsidiary of National Iranian Oil Company.

NISOC was incorporated in 1971 in Masjed Soleyman, Khouzestan as Oil Service Company of Iran (OSCO). Currently NISOC is Iran's biggest oil producer, and produces 3 million barrels of oil per day. The company is active in a land area more than 400,000 km^{2} with headquarters in Ahvaz. NISOC is producing about 83% of all crude oil and 17% of natural gas produced in Iran and ranks as the Iran's biggest oil company.

National Iranian South Oilfields Company, through its subsidiaries, produces crude oil, gas, and liquefied gases. The company's reserves portfolio include Ahvaz Field (the world's 3rd largest oil field) and in charge of onshore giant oilfields in Iran (like Gachsaran, Maroun, Bibi Hakimeh, RagSefid and Aghajari) and focuses on onshore upstream activity in the province of Khuzestan, Kohgiluyeh and Boyer-Ahmad, Bushehr and Ilam. As Khuzestan is the main oil- and gas-producing province, this entity is among the most significant in the NIOC subsidiaries.

== Aghajari oil field ==
The Aghajari oil field is an iranian oil field located in Khuzestan Province. It was discovered by Anglo-Persian Oil Company in 1938 and developed by National Iranian Oil Company. It began production in 1940 and produces oil. The total proven reserves of the Aghajari oil field are around 30 billion barrels (3758 million tonnes), and production is centered on 170,000 barrels per day (27,000 m^{3}/d). The field is owned by state-owned National Iranian Oil Company (NIOC) and operated by NISOC.

=== Aghajari Gas Injection Project ===
The Aghajari Gas Injection Project is the world’s biggest enhanced oil recovery project inaugurated in Iran in late 2008, aiming at boosting production from the aging Aghajari oil field. The reservoir dimension of Aghajari fields is 56×6 km with the original oil-in-place of 28 billion barrels (4.5×10^{9} m^{3}) and 10.2 billion barrels of recoverable oil (based on latest studies). The total quantities extracted since the start of operations at Aghajari till this date have been 8.8 bn barrels.

However, production has been on the decline because of loss of pressure and oil extraction, so that current output is 180,000 barrels (29,000 m^{3}) a day.

With injection of 3.6 billion cubic feet (100,000,000 m^{3}) of gas per day (20 trillion cubic feet (570 km^{3}) of gas in total) from the south pars field and subsequent buildup of pressure, an additional quantity of 1.2 billion barrels (190,000,000 m^{3}) of oil will be produced. It is also estimated that daily crude oil output of the field will increase to 300,000 barrels per day (48,000 m^{3}/d).

Project consists of three main parts;

- Upstream:

Development of South Pars phases 6, 7 and 8.

- Midstream:

The 504-km long, 56-inch pipeline for transfer of sour gas from the South Pars gas field phases 6,7 and 8 to be injected to Aghajari oilfield.

- Downstream:

Installation of a gas-compression station, drilling of 19 new wells, work over of 3 existing wells for gas injection, installing pipelines on 2 existing gas injecting wells.

== See also ==
- Petroleum industry in Iran
- National Iranian Oil Company
- World Largest Gas Fields
- National Iranian Gas Company
- NIOC Recent Discoveries
- Iran Natural Gas Reserves
- South Pars
- North Pars
- Kish Gas Field
- Golshan Gas Field
- Ferdowsi Gas Field
- Persian LNG
- Iran Gas Trunkline (IGAT)
