= List of natural gas fields =

List of current and former natural gas fields in the world

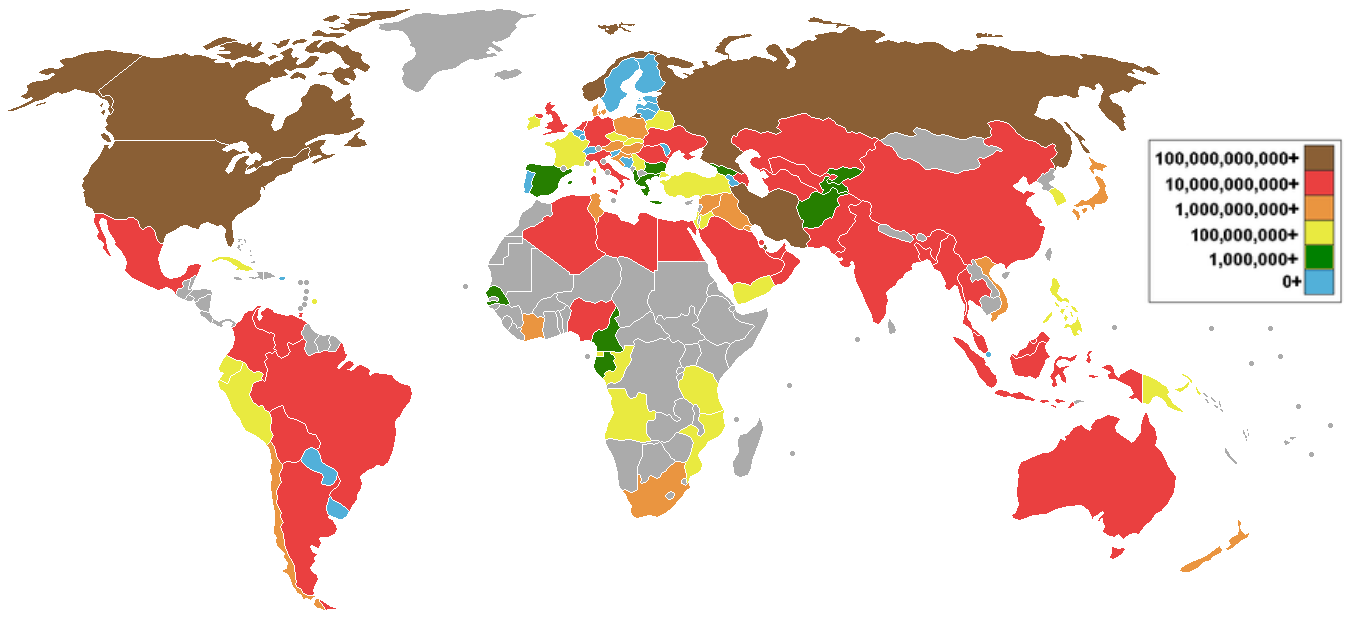
Countries where natural gas fields are located

This list of natural gas fields includes major fields of the past and present.

N.B. Some of the items listed are basins or projects that comprise many fields (e.g. Sakhalin has three fields: Chayvo, Odoptu, and Arkutun-Dagi).

== 25 largest conventional non-associated gas fields ==
No.	Field name	Country	Recoverable reserves		10^9 BOE	Depletion (as of 2021)
1	South Pars / North Dome	Iran and Qatar	1,230×10^{12} cu ft	35,000 km^{3}	220	10 %
2	Urengoy	Russia	222×10^{12} cu ft	6,300 km^{3}	38	90 %
3	Yamburg	Russia	138×10^{12} cu ft	3,900 km^{3}	24	80 %
4	Bovanenkovo	Russia	140×10^{12} cu ft	4,000 km^{3}	24	20 %
5	Hassi R’Mel	Algeria	123×10^{12} cu ft	3,500 km^{3}	21	80 %
6	Shtokman	Russia	110×10^{12} cu ft	3,100 km^{3}	19	0 %
7	Galkynysh	Turkmenistan	98×10^{12} cu ft	2,800 km^{3}	17	unknown
8	Rusanovskoye	Russia	100×10^{12} cu ft	2,800 km^{3}	17	0 %
9	Astrakhan	Russia	100×10^{12} cu ft	2,800 km^{3}	16	75 %
10	Zapolyarnoye	Russia	95×10^{12} cu ft	2,700 km^{3}	16	40 %
11	Groningen	Netherlands	73×10^{12} cu ft	2,100 km^{3}	13	95 %
12	Leningradskoye	Russia	70×10^{12} cu ft	2,000 km^{3}	12	0 %
13	Kruzenshtern	Russia	70×10^{12} cu ft	2,000 km^{3}	11	5 %
14	Medvezhye	Russia	68×10^{12} cu ft	1,900 km^{3}	11	95 %
15	Troll	Norway	63×10^{12} cu ft	1,800 km^{3}	11	60 %
16	Dauletabad	Turkmenistan	49.5×10^{12} cu ft	1,400 km^{3}	8	unknown
17	Karachaganak	Kazakhstan	48.4×10^{12} cu ft	1,370 km^{3}	8	45 %
18	North Pars	Iran	47.2×10^{12} cu ft	1,340 km^{3}	8	0 %
19	Kish	Iran	45×10^{12} cu ft	1,300 km^{3}	8	unknown
20	Orenburg	Russia	45×10^{12} cu ft	1,300 km^{3}	8	90 %
21	Kharasavey	Russia	42×10^{12} cu ft	1,200 km^{3}	7	5 %
22	Shah Deniz	Azerbaijan	42×10^{12} cu ft	1,200 km^{3}	7	20 %
23	Golshan	Iran	30×10^{12} cu ft	850 km^{3}	5	0 %
24	Zohr	Egypt	30×10^{12} cu ft	850 km^{3}	5	10 %
25	Hugoton	United States	27×10^{12} cu ft	760 km^{3}	5	95 %

Table sources:

Data was retrieved from, depletion levels from or calculated from open source production data.

Notes:

- Gasfields are non-associated gas and condensate fields.
- Size refers to ultimate recoverable reserves (including past production) expressed in trillion cubic feet.

== By location ==
Algeria

- Hassi R'mel (96×10^{12} cu ft (2,700 km^{3}))

Australia

- Bass Strait
- Jansz (20×10^{12} cu ft (570 km^{3}))
- Greater Gorgon (40×10^{12} cu ft (1,100 km^{3}))
- Browse Venture (16×10^{12} cu ft (450 km^{3})
- North West Shelf Venture (33×10^{12} cu ft (930 km^{3}))
- Yolla gas field
- Fairview, Scotia, Spring Gully, Bowen Basin

Azerbaijan

- Shah Deniz gas field (44×10^{12} cu ft (1,200 km^{3}))

Bahrain

- Awali (20×10^{12} cu ft (570 km^{3}))

Bolivia (~1.5 trillion m^{3})

- Margarita
- Sabalo
- Itaú-San Alberto

Brazil

- Albacora-Leste oil field (5.7×10^{12} cu ft (160 km^{3}))
- Jupiter gas field (17 x 10¹²) cu ft ( 480 km^{3}))
- Marlin gas field (3.8×10^{12} cu ft (110 km^{3}))
- Tupi oil field (7×10^{12} cu ft (200 km^{3}))

Burma

- Zawtica (8.5×10^{12} cu ft (240 km^{3}))
- Shwe Gas (located in Rakhine state)

Canada

- Sable Offshore Energy Project
- Elsuort (53×10^{12} cu ft (1,500 km^{3}))
- Kopanoar (12.5×10^{12} cu ft (350 km^{3}))
- King Kristian (12.5×10^{12} cu ft (350 km^{3}))
- Greater Sierra
- Hekla gas field (7.5 198 billion m^{3})
- Drake Point (5.4×10^{12} cu ft (150 km^{3}))
- Medicine Hat
- Provost, Alberta (town)

China

- Anyue gas field (15.4×10^{12} cu ft (440 km^{3}))
- Canxue gas field
- Chunxiao gas field (0.17×10^{12} cu ft (4.8 km^{3}))
- Duanqiao gas field
- Karamay (1.1×10^{12} cu ft (31 km^{3}))
- Shiyugou Dunxi (7.5×10^{12} cu ft (210 km^{3}))
- Sulige (20×10^{12} cu ft (570 km^{3}))
- Tianwaitian gas field

Cyprus

- Aphrodite gas field (5×10^{12} cu ft (140 km^{3}))
- Calypso gas field (8×10^{12} cu ft (230 km^{3}))
- Glaucos 1 gas field (5×10^{12}–8×10^{12} cu ft (140–230 km^{3}))
- Onisiforos gas field (0.5×10^{12} cu ft (14 km^{3}))
- Cronos 1 gas field (2.5×10^{12} cu ft (71 km^{3}))
- Zeus 1 gas field (2.0×10^{12} cu ft (57 km^{3}))

Ecuador

- Amistad gas field (9.8×10^{12} cu ft (280 km^{3}))

Egypt

- Nile Delta Basin (50×10^{12} cu ft (1,400 km^{3}))

New finding in the Nile Delta Basin of 223×10^{12} cu ft (6,300 km^{3}))

  - Wakar (1.5×10^{12} cu ft (42 km^{3}))
  - Temsah (1.5×10^{12} cu ft (42 km^{3}))
  - Ras El Barr (4×10^{12} cu ft (110 km^{3}))
  - Halawa (1×10^{12} cu ft (28 km^{3}))
  - Kafr Al Shaikh (2×10^{12} cu ft (57 km^{3}))
  - Zohr (30×10^{12} cu ft (850 km^{3}))

Ethiopia

- Ogaden Basin (2.4×10^{9} cu ft (68,000,000 m^{3}), 68 million m^{3})

France

- Lacq (9×10^{12} cu ft (250 km^{3}))

Hungary

- Makó gas field (22-55×10^{12} cu ft (1,600 km^{3}))

India

- Krishna Godavari Basin KG-D6 gas field (9.2×10^{12} cu ft (260 km^{3}))

Indonesia

- Arun gas field (5×10^{12} cu ft (140 km^{3})), depleted 14 sep 2015.
- Mahakam gas field (31×10^{12} cu ft (880 km^{3}))
- Peciko gas field (6.1×10^{12} cu ft (170 km^{3}))
- Sakakemang gas field (2×10^{12} cu ft (57 km^{3}))
- Tangguh gas field (14×10^{12} cu ft (400 km^{3}))
- Tuna gas field
- Abadi gas field(10×10^{12} cu ft (280 km^{3}))

Iran

- South Pars (500×10^{12} cu ft (14,000 km^{3}))
- North Pars (59×10^{12} cu ft (1,700 km^{3}))
- Kish Gas Field (58×10^{12} cu ft (1,600 km^{3}))
- Golshan Gas Field (45 - 55×10^{12} cu ft (1,600 km^{3}))
- Forouz gas field (24.8×10^{12} cu ft (700 km^{3}))
- Tabnak (21.2×10^{12} cu ft (600 km^{3}))
- Kangan (20.1×10^{12} cu ft (570 km^{3}))
- Farsi (11-22×10^{12} cu ft (620 km^{3}))
- Nar (13×10^{12} cu ft (370 km^{3}))
- Aghar (11.6×10^{12} cu ft (330 km^{3}))
- Khangiran (11×10^{12} cu ft (310 km^{3}))
- Ahwaz Field (11×10^{12} cu ft (310 km^{3}))
- Ferdowsi Gas Field (10×10^{12} cu ft (280 km^{3}))
- Aghajari Field (10×10^{12} cu ft (280 km^{3}))
- Gachsaran Field (6×10^{12} cu ft (170 km^{3}))

Iraq

- Kirkuk Field (3×10^{12} cu ft (85 km^{3}))
- Akkas gas field (46×10^{12} cu ft (1,300 km^{3}))

Ireland

- Corrib gas project (1×10^{12} cu ft (28 km^{3}))
- Kinsale Head gas field (1.4×10^{12} cu ft (40 km^{3}))

Israel

- Noa North
- Mari (1.1×10^{12} cu ft (31 km^{3}))
- Tamar gas field (8.4×10^{12} cu ft (240 km^{3}))
- Dalit (0.53×10^{12} cu ft (15 km^{3}))
- Leviathan gas field (18.9×10^{12} cu ft (540 km^{3}))
- Sarah and Myra
- Dolphin
- Tanin gas field

Italy

- Malossa field
- San Salvo field
- San Giorgio field
- Angeli field
- Cassiopea gas field

Japan

- Minami Kanto gas field (375 billion m^{3})

Kazakhstan

- Karachaganak field (63×10^{12} cu ft (1,800 km^{3}))
- Kisimbay field (11.7×10^{12} cu ft (330 km^{3}))
- Kyzyloi Field (53.6×10^{12} cu ft (1,520 km^{3}))
- Tengiz Field

Lebanon

- Chekka
- Levant Basin Province (estimated total of this entire region 122×10^{12} cu ft (3,500 km^{3})) within the territorial waters of Lebanon, Turkey, the Palestinian Gaza Strip, Israel, Syria, and Cyprus
- North Levant Basin

Libya

- Khateyba (11×10^{12} cu ft (310 km^{3}))

Mauritania

- Chinguetti field (fairly large estimates)

Mexico

- Reynosa gas field
- Chicontepec Field (42×10^{12} cu ft (1,200 km^{3}))
- Tabasco
- Noxal oil field (0.25×10^{12} cu ft (7.1 km^{3}))

Mozambique

- Collier gas field (5.0×10^{12} cu ft (140 km^{3}))

Namibia

- Kudu gas field (1.3 – 9×10^{12} cu ft (250 km^{3}))

Netherlands

- Annerveen gas field
- Groningen (100×10^{12} cu ft (2,800 km^{3})) - also known as Slochteren
- L10 gas field

New Zealand

- Maui gas field (3.6×10^{12} cu ft (100 km^{3}))
- Pohokura field (1.0×10^{12} cu ft (28 km^{3}))
- Kupe field (0.2×10^{12} cu ft (5.7 km^{3}))
- Kapuni (1.3×10^{12} cu ft (37 km^{3}))

Nigeria

- Akpo
- Bonga Field

North Sea

- Asgard field, Norway (8.5×10^{12} cu ft (240 km^{3}))
- Amethyst gasfield
- Brent oilfield
- Dan field
- Easington Catchment Area
- Ekofisk oil field, Norway (7×10^{12} cu ft (200 km^{3}))
- Everest gasfield
- Frigg gas field (7×10^{12} cu ft (200 km^{3}))
- Gullfaks oil field (1×10^{12} cu ft (28 km^{3}))
- Gullfaks Sor field (1.5×10^{12} cu ft (42 km^{3}))
- Heimdal field (1.6×10^{12} cu ft (45 km^{3}))
- Indefatigable field (12.6×10^{12} cu ft (360 km^{3}))
- Kristin field (1.2×10^{12} cu ft (34 km^{3}))
- Kvitebjon field (2×10^{12} cu ft (57 km^{3}))
- Lemen Bank (17×10^{12} cu ft (480 km^{3}))
- Mikkel field (1×10^{12} cu ft (28 km^{3}))
- Eldfisk field (2×10^{12} cu ft (57 km^{3}))
- Oseberg oil field, Norway (3.8×10^{12} cu ft (110 km^{3}))
- Rhum gasfield (0.9×10^{12} cu ft (25 km^{3}))
- Sleipner gas field (65×10^{12} cu ft (1,800 km^{3}))
- Snorre oil field (0.24×10^{12} cu ft (6.8 km^{3}))
- Statfjord oil field (3×10^{12} cu ft (85 km^{3}))
- Troll, Norway
- Valhall oil field (1×10^{12} cu ft (28 km^{3}))
- Viking field (3.2×10^{12} cu ft (91 km^{3}))
- Visund field (2×10^{12} cu ft (57 km^{3}))

Norwegian Sea and Barents Sea (Norwegian part of the Barents Sea only)

- Heidrun oil field (1.5×10^{12} cu ft (42 km^{3}))
- Ormen Lange, Norway (11.1×10^{12} cu ft (310 km^{3}))
- Snøhvit, Norway (3.9×10^{12} cu ft (110 km^{3}))
- Troll, Norway (46.8×10^{12} cu ft (1,330 km^{3}))

Pakistan (~10^{12}m^{3})

- Adhi Oil and Gas Field
- Badin
- Bhit gas field
- Khasan gas field
- Kadanwari
- Kandkhot field (2×10^{12} cu ft (57 km^{3}))
- Khan field
- Mari field
- Miano gas field
- Mizra field
- Qadirpur gas field
- Sawan Gas Field (1×10^{12} cu ft (28 km^{3}))
- Sui gas field (13×10^{12} cu ft (370 km^{3}))
- Toot gas field
- Ul Haq field (1×10^{12} cu ft (28 km^{3}))
- Zamzama field

Palestine (Gaza)

- Gaza marine gas field

Peru

- Camisea Gas Project

Philippines

- Malampaya gas field
- Sampaguita gas field

Qatar

- North Field, Ras Laffan, exceeding 900 trillion cubic feet (25,000 km^{3})

Romania (~600 billion m^{3})

- Transylvanian Basin
  - Filitelnic gas field (1.786×10^{12} cu ft (50.6 km^{3}))
- Carpathian oil basin
  - Grădiștea gas field (0.17×10^{12} cu ft (4.8 km^{3}))
  - Mamu gas field (0.276×10^{12} cu ft (7.8 km^{3}))
- Bacău oil basin
  - Roman-Secuieni gas field (0.85×10^{12} cu ft (24 km^{3}))
- Pannonian Basin

Russia

- Urengoy gas field (385×10^{12} cu ft (10,900 km^{3}))
- Yamburg gas field (198×10^{12} cu ft (5,600 km^{3}))
- Bovanenkovskoe field (166×10^{12} cu ft (4,700 km^{3}))
- Leningradskoye field (151×10^{12} cu ft (4,300 km^{3}))
- Rusanovskoye field (151×10^{12} cu ft (4,300 km^{3}))
- Zapolyarnoye gas field (132×10^{12} cu ft (3,700 km^{3}))
- Shtokman field (113×10^{12} cu ft (3,200 km^{3}))
- Arctic field (104×10^{12} cu ft (2,900 km^{3}))
- Astrakhanskoye field (102×10^{12} cu ft (2,900 km^{3}))
- West Kamchatka shelf (868×10^{12} cu ft (24,600 km^{3}))
- Medvezhye field (83×10^{12} cu ft (2,400 km^{3}))
- Yurubchen (73.7×10^{12} cu ft (2,090 km^{3}))
- Kharasoveiskoye field (62.5×10^{12} cu ft (1,770 km^{3}))
- Orenburgskoe field (62.5×10^{12} cu ft (1,770 km^{3}))
- Kovykta field (62.5×10^{12} cu ft (1,770 km^{3}))
- Kyrtael field (60×10^{12} cu ft (1,700 km^{3}))
- Sakhalin-III (49×10^{12} cu ft (1,400 km^{3}))
- Chayandinskoye field (46.8×10^{12} cu ft (1,330 km^{3}))
- Angaro-Lenskoye field (46×10^{12} cu ft (1,300 km^{3}))
- Central-Astrakhan field (45×10^{12} cu ft (1,300 km^{3}))
- Yuzhno-Russkoye field (35×10^{12} cu ft (990 km^{3}))
- South-Tambey field (35×10^{12} cu ft (990 km^{3}))
- Krusenstern field (34×10^{12} cu ft (960 km^{3}))
- North-Tambey field (35×10^{12} cu ft (990 km^{3}))
- Kharampurskoye field (32×10^{12} cu ft (910 km^{3}))
- Pestsovoe field (30×10^{12} cu ft (850 km^{3}))
- Utrenneye field (28×10^{12} cu ft (790 km^{3}))
- Malyginskoye field (28×10^{12} cu ft (790 km^{3}))
- Yurkharovskoye field (26×10^{12} cu ft (740 km^{3}))
- Harvutinskoye field (26×10^{12} cu ft (740 km^{3}))
- North-Urengoy field (21×10^{12} cu ft (590 km^{3}))
- Ledovoe field (19×10^{12} cu ft (540 km^{3}))
- Samburg field (19×10^{12} cu ft (540 km^{3}))
- Sakhalin-II (18.8×10^{12} cu ft (530 km^{3}))
- Kamennomysskoye field (19×10^{12} cu ft (540 km^{3}))
- Sakhalin-I (17.1×10^{12} cu ft (480 km^{3}))
- Tasiyskoye field (16.6×10^{12} cu ft (470 km^{3}))
- Yamsoveiskoye gas field (15×10^{12} cu ft (420 km^{3}))
- East-Tarkosalinskoye field (15×10^{12} cu ft (420 km^{3}))
- Aneryahinskoye field (15×10^{12} cu ft (420 km^{3}))
- Gubkinskoye field (15×10^{12} cu ft (420 km^{3}))
- Vuktyl (14.7×10^{12} cu ft (420 km^{3}))
- Beregovoye field (12.2×10^{12} cu ft (350 km^{3}))
- Yubileynoye field (12.2×10^{12} cu ft (350 km^{3}))
- Hvalynskoye field (12.2×10^{12} cu ft (350 km^{3}))
- Tarkosalinskoye (12.2×10^{12} cu ft (350 km^{3}))
- North-Kamennomysskoye field (12×10^{12} cu ft (340 km^{3}))
- Ety-Purovskoye Field (11×10^{12} cu ft (310 km^{3}))
- Vyngapurovskoye field (11×10^{12} cu ft (310 km^{3}))
- Nahodkinskoe field (10×10^{12} cu ft (280 km^{3}))
- Pelyadkinskoe field (9.5×10^{12} cu ft (270 km^{3}))
- Lyantorskoye field (9.4×10^{12} cu ft (270 km^{3}))
- West-Astrakhan field (9.4×10^{12} cu ft (270 km^{3}))
- Severo-Stavropolskoye field (8.6×10^{12} cu ft (240 km^{3}))
- Nurminskoye field (8.4×10^{12} cu ft (240 km^{3}))
- Ludlovskoye field (8×10^{12} cu ft (230 km^{3}))
- Geophisicheskoye field (7.9×10^{12} cu ft (220 km^{3}))
- Verhneviluchanskoye field (7.9×10^{12} cu ft (220 km^{3}))
- Minkhovskoye field (7.8×10^{12} cu ft (220 km^{3}))
- Novo Portovskoye field (7.5×10^{12} cu ft (210 km^{3}))
- Yen-Yahinskoye field (7.5×10^{12} cu ft (210 km^{3}))
- West-Siyakhinskoye field (7.2×10^{12} cu ft (200 km^{3}))
- North-Komsomolskoye field (7.1×10^{12} cu ft (200 km^{3}))
- Sredne-Tyugskoye field (6.2×10^{12} cu ft (180 km^{3}))
- Soletsko-Khanaveyskoye field (5.8×10^{12} cu ft (160 km^{3}))
- Layavozhskoye field (5.3×10^{12} cu ft (150 km^{3}))
- Gydanskoye field (4.4×10^{12} cu ft (120 km^{3}))
- Tas-Yuryakhskoye field (4.2×10^{12} cu ft (120 km^{3}))
- Hancheiskoye field (4.2×10^{12} cu ft (120 km^{3}))
- Verhnetiuteyskoye field (4.2×10^{12} cu ft (120 km^{3}))
- Vyngayahinskoye field (4.0×10^{12} cu ft (110 km^{3}))
- Myldzhinskoye field (3.8×10^{12} cu ft (110 km^{3}))
- Messoyakha Gas Field (3.8×10^{12} cu ft (110 km^{3}))

Saudi Arabia

- Ghawar Field (57×10^{12} cu ft (1,600 km^{3}))

Saudi-Iraqi neutral zone

- Dorra (35×10^{12} cu ft (990 km^{3}))

Saudi-Kuwaiti neutral zone

- Safaniya-Khafji Field (12.3×10^{12} cu ft (350 km^{3}))

South Korea

- Donghae-1 gas field

Syria

- Levant Basin province (estimated total of this entire region 122×10^{12} cu ft (3,500 km^{3})) within the territorial waters of Syria, the Palestinian Gaza Strip, Israel, Lebanon, and Cyprus
- The Leviathan gas field located off the coast of Israel and Palestine (Gaza), and possibly Lebanon

Taiwan

- Nushan

Tajikistan

- Komsomolsk gas field (11.2×10^{12} cu ft (320 km^{3}))

Turkey

- Sakarya (19×10^{12} cu ft (540 km^{3}))
- Tuna-1 (11.2×10^{12} cu ft (320 km^{3}))

Turkmenistan

- Iolotan gas field (264×10^{12} cu ft (7,500 km^{3}))
- Dauletabad gas field (60×10^{12} cu ft (1,700 km^{3}))
- Shatlyk gas field (44×10^{12} cu ft (1,200 km^{3}))
- Achak gas field (5.7×10^{12} cu ft (160 km^{3}))
- South Gutliyak gas field

Ukraine

- Efremovske field (4×10^{12} cu ft (110 km^{3}))
- Shebeli field (25×10^{12} cu ft (710 km^{3}))
- West-Khrestish field (13×10^{12} cu ft (370 km^{3}))

United Arab Emirates

- Rub Al Khali Province (426×10^{12} cu ft (12,100 km^{3})) part of Rub Al Khali province is in the territory of the United Arab Emirates

United Kingdom

- Lockton natural gas field
- Ryedale gas fields

United States

- Anadarko Basin (100×10^{12} cu ft (2,800 km^{3}))
- Barnett Shale [Newark East Gas Field] (46.5×10^{12} cu ft (1,320 km^{3}))
- Carthage Gas Field (18×10^{12} cu ft (510 km^{3}))
- Cisco Springs Oil Field (13-15×10^{12} cu ft (420 km^{3}))
- Fayetteville Shale (18.2×10^{12} cu ft (520 km^{3}))
- Gomez Gas Field (11×10^{12} cu ft (310 km^{3}))
- Haynesville Shale (250×10^{12} cu ft (7,100 km^{3}))
- Hugoton Natural Gas Area (27×10^{12} cu ft (760 km^{3}))
- Jonah Gas Field (10.5×10^{12} cu ft (300 km^{3}))
- Katy Gas Field (13.7×10^{12} cu ft (390 km^{3}))
- Kettleman North Dome Oil Field (13.7×10^{12} cu ft (390 km^{3}))
- Kenai Field (5.7×10^{12} cu ft (160 km^{3}))
- Marcellus Shale (168-516×10^{12} cu ft (14,600 km^{3})) billion m^{3})
- McFaddin Oil & Gas Field (0.5×10^{12} cu ft (14 km^{3}))
- Mocane-Laverne Gas Area (Part of Anadarko Basin)
- Monroe Gas Field (6.5×10^{12} cu ft (180 km^{3}))
- Old Ocean Gas Field (4.5×10^{12} cu ft (130 km^{3}))
- Point Thomson (113×10^{12} cu ft (3,200 km^{3}))
- Prudhoe Bay (28×10^{12} cu ft (790 km^{3}))
- Rio Vista Gas Field (3.9×10^{12} cu ft (110 km^{3}))
- South Pass Field
- Tom O'Connor Oil & Gas Field (1×10^{12} cu ft (28 km^{3}))
- Vermilion Block 14 (1.8×10^{12} cu ft (51 km^{3}))
- Wamsutter Gas Field

Uzbekistan

- Shurtan (24×10^{12} cu ft (680 km^{3}))
- Gazli (18×10^{12} cu ft (510 km^{3}))
- Zevardi (8.3×10^{12} cu ft (240 km^{3}))
- Alan gas field (68×10^{12} cu ft (1,900 km^{3}))
- Dengizkul-Khauzak (KKSK project) (6.3×10^{12} cu ft (180 km^{3}))
- Kandym (KKSK project) (5.8×10^{12} cu ft (160 km^{3}))
- Kokdamulak (5.4×10^{12} cu ft (150 km^{3}))
- Urtabulak gas field (3.9×10^{12} cu ft (110 km^{3}))
- Urga/Kuanysh/Akchalak (44×10^{12} cu ft (1,200 km^{3}))

Venezuela

- Deltana Platform (6×10^{12} cu ft (170 km^{3})); see also: Orinoco Belt
- Perla gas field (14×10^{12} cu ft (400 km^{3}))

Vietnam

- Baovang (11×10^{12} cu ft (310 km^{3}))

== By size ==
Sorted by size (billion m^{3}):

1. Asalouyeh, South Pars Gas Field (10000 - 15000)
2. Urengoy gas field (10200)
3. Marcellus shale (4452–13674)
4. Haynesville Shale (7079)
5. Iolotan gas field (7000)
6. Yamburg gas field (5242)
7. Bovanenkovskoe field (4400)
8. Leningradskoye field (4000)
9. Rusanovskoye field (4000)
10. Zapolyarnoye gas field (3500)
11. Shtokman field (3200)
12. Point Tomson (3000)
13. Manas (3000)
14. Groningen (2850)
15. Astrakhanskoye field (2711)
16. Anadarko Basin (2650)
17. Sampaguita gas field (2600)
18. Hassi R'mel (2549)
19. West Kamchatka shelf (2300)
20. Medvezhye field (2200)
21. Yurubchen (2100)
22. Hugoton Natural Gas Area (2039)
23. Kharasoveiskoye field (1900)
24. Orenburgskoe field (1900)
25. Kovykta field (1900)
26. Karachaganak field, Kazakhstan (1800)
27. Dauletabad gas field (1602)
28. Jupiter gas field (1000–1600)
29. Kyrtael field (1600)
30. North Pars (1565)
31. Kish Gas Field (1560)
32. Ghawar Field (1500)
33. Kyzyloi Field (1420)
34. Pazanun (1415)
35. Elsuort (more than 1400)
36. Golshan Gas Field (1325)
37. Troll (1325)
38. Sakhalin-III (1300)
39. Chayandinskoye field (1240)
40. Angaro-Lenskoye field (1220)
41. Shah Deniz gas field (1200)
42. Central-Astrakhan field (1200)
43. Shatlyk gas field (1200)
44. Urtga/Kuanysh/Akchalak (1200)
45. Shebeli field (1200)
46. Chicontepec Field (1100)
47. Greater Gorgon (1100)
48. Dorra (1000)
49. Yuzhno-Russkoye field (1000)
50. South-Tambey field (1000)
51. Dazhou (600)
52. Krusenstern field (960)
53. North-Tambey field (929)
54. North West Shelf Venture (875)
55. Kharampurskoye field (825)
56. Mahakam gas field (822)
57. Pestsovoe field (800)
58. Utrenneye field (747)
59. Malyginskoye field (745)
60. Yurkharovskoye field (740)
61. Prudhoe Bay, Alaska (736)
62. Harvutinskoye field (700)
63. Shurtan (634)
64. North-Urengoy field (600)
65. Jansz (570)
66. Tabnak (562)
67. leviathan (540)
68. Sulige (534)
69. Kangan (533)
70. Avali (530)
71. Samburg field (500)
72. Sakhalin-II (500)
73. Tangguh gas field (500)
74. Kamennomysskoye field (500)
75. Ledovoe field (500)
76. Sakhalin-I (485)
77. Gazli (477)
78. Lemen Bank (460)
79. Tasiyskoye field (440)
80. Yamsoveiskoye gas field (436)
81. Farsi (425)
82. Ormen Lange (400)
83. Aneryahinskoye field (400)
84. Gubkinskoye field (400)
85. Vuktyl (390)
86. Minami Kanto gas field (375)
87. Cisco Springs Oil Field (370)
88. Katie field (362)
89. Kettlemen Hills field (362)
90. Kamrik (360)
91. Kandkhot field (347)
92. Nar (345)
93. West-Khrestish field (335)
94. Indefatigable field (333)
95. Kopanoar (331)
96. King Kristian (330)
97. Safaniya-Khafji Field (327)
98. Beregovoe field (324)
99. Yubileynoye field (323)
100. Hvalynskoye field (322)
101. Tarkosalinskoye (322)
102. Kisimbay field (310)
103. North-Kamennomysskoye field (310)
104. Aghar (307)
105. Jonah Field (300)
106. Ety-Purovskoye Field (300)
107. Khangiran (300)
108. Khateyba (300)
109. Ahwaz Field (300)
110. Baovang (300)
111. Ferdowsi Gas Field (297)
112. Komsomolsk gas field (296)
113. Vyngapurovskoye field (290)
114. Gomez gas field (283)
115. Nahodkinskoe field (275)
116. Pelyadkinskoe field (255)
117. Lacq (250)
118. Lyantorskoye field (250)
119. West-Astrakhan field (250)
120. Severo-Stavropolskoye field (229)
121. Asgard field (226)
122. Zawtica (225)
123. Nurminskoye field (223)
124. Zevardi (220)
125. Ludlovskoye field (220)
126. Geophisicheskoye field (210)
127. Verhneviluchanskoye field (209)
128. Minkhovskoye field (208)
129. Novo Portovskoye field (200)
130. Yen-Yahinskoye field (200)
131. Frigg gas field (200)
132. Hekla gas field (198)
133. Shiyugou Dunxi (198)
134. West-Siyakhinskoye field (190)
135. North-Komsomolskoye field (186)
136. Ekofisk oil field (185)
137. Scott reef (180)
138. Alan gas field (179)
139. Sleipner gas field (174)
140. Dengizkul-Khauzak (167)
141. Amistad gas field (163)
142. Sredne-Tyugskoye field (165)
143. Peciko field (162)
144. Deltana Platform (160)
145. Soletsko-Khanaveyskoye field (155)
146. Kandym (153)
147. Kenai (152)
148. Achak gas field (150)
149. Albacora-Leste oil field (150)
150. Kokdamulak (144)
151. Drake Point (142)
152. Tamar 1 (142)
153. Mokane Lavern (140)
154. Snøhvit (140)
155. Layavozhskoye field (140)
156. Arun gas field (125)
157. Gydanskoye field (116)
158. Tas-Yuryakhskoye field (112)
159. Hancheiskoye (111)
160. Efremovske field (110)
161. Vyngayahinskoye field (107)
162. Ras El Barr (106)
163. Urtabulak gas field (103)
164. Oseberg oil field (102)
165. Myldzhinskoye field (100)
166. Marlin (100)
167. Messoyakha Gas Field (100)
168. Kudu gas field (34 – 240)
169. Barnett Shale (60 - 900)
170. Sui Gas Field (50–60)

== See also ==
- Oil fields
- Giant oil and gas fields
- List of countries by natural gas proven reserves
- List of countries by natural gas production
- National Oil Company
