= Azadegan oil field =

Oil field in Iran

- Location within Iran
- Country: Iran
- Offshore/onshore: onshore
- Coordinates: 31.32°N 48.53°E
- Operator: Arvandan Oil and Gas Company
- Partners: NIOC

Field history
- Discovery: 1999

Production
- Current production of oil: 40,000 barrels per day (~2.0×10^{6} t/a)
- Estimated oil in place: 33,200 million barrels (~4.53×10^{9} t)
- Recoverable oil: 5,200 million barrels (~7.1×10^{8} t)
- Producing formations: Sarvak, Kazhdomi, Godvan, and Fahilan layers

The Azadegan oil field is an oil field in Iran. It is located 80 kilometres (50 mi) west of Ahvaz, near the Iraqi border.

== History ==
The first exploration well was drilled in the field in 1976, but its discovery was finalized after drilling the second well in 1999. The field has an approximate area of 900 square kilometres (350 sq mi).

== Reserves ==
Iranian authorities claim that the Azadegan field has oil-in-place reserves of about 33.2 billion barrels (5.28×10^{9} m^{3}) and recoverable resources estimated at about 5.2 billion barrels (830×10^{6} m^{3}). It is one of the NIOC Recent Discoveries and the biggest oil field found in Iran in the last 30 years.

Sarvak, Kazhdomi, Godvan, and Fahilan are productive layers of the field. The current production is 40,000 barrels per day (6,400 m^{3}/d). Crude oil produced by the Fahilan layer is light while the other layers yield heavy crude.

== See also ==
- Yadavaran Field
- World Largest Gas Fields
- NIOC Recent Discoveries
- South Pars Gas Field
- Iran Natural Gas Reserves
- North Pars
- Golshan Gas Field
- Ferdowsi Gas Field
- Persian LNG

== Other sources ==
- Atimes
- NIOC
