= Yadavaran Field =

Iranian oil field

Coordinates: 30°59′18″N 48°02′32″E

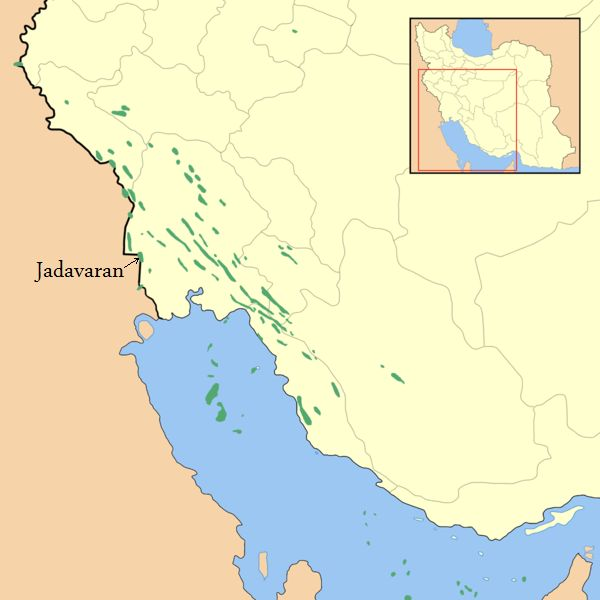
Map of Yadavaran

The Yadavaran Field is an oil field in Khuzestan, Iran. Discovered by the NIOC, it is made up of two former fields, Koushk (discovered in 2000) and Hosseinieh (discovered in 2002). After researchers discovered that the two fields were actually connected, the field was renamed as the Yadavaran Field.

The field is estimated to have reserves of up to 17 billion barrels (2.7 km^{3}) of oil, with 3 billion barrels (0.5 km^{3}) considered to be recoverable.

On October 29, 2004, Iran negotiated a $70 billion deal with Sinopec, giving the Chinese company a 51% stake in the field's development. As part of the deal, China agreed to buy 10 million metric tons of liquefied natural gas (LNG) from Iran per annum for 25 years.

In December 2007, NIOC and Sinopec signed the final agreement for development of Yadavaran oil field. Based on the contract field will reach to the 180,000 bbl/d (29,000 m^{3}/d) of production capacity. Sinopec will be operator with a 51% stake in the project and NIOC holding the remaining interest. Total project cost at around US$2 billion. In a third phase the field is expected to reach 300,000 bbl/d (48,000 m^{3}/d) of production capacity.

The field will be developed under an enhanced Iranian buyback contract. The most significant revision in terms from earlier versions is that the partners will only agree the target capital cost of the development following receipt of construction tender submissions. This should reduce the contractors’ exposure to value erosion through cost inflation.

The oil field is currently at an early production of 16,000 bbl/d (2,500 m^{3}/d) after 16 months development by the Chinese contractor.

== See also ==
- Azadegan
- NIOC Recent Discoveries
- Iran Natural Gas Reserves
- South Pars
- North Pars
- Golshan Gas Field
- Ferdowsi Gas Field
- Persian LNG
- Al-Fakkah Field.
