= Kish Gas Field =

Giant gas field near Kish Island, Persian Gulf

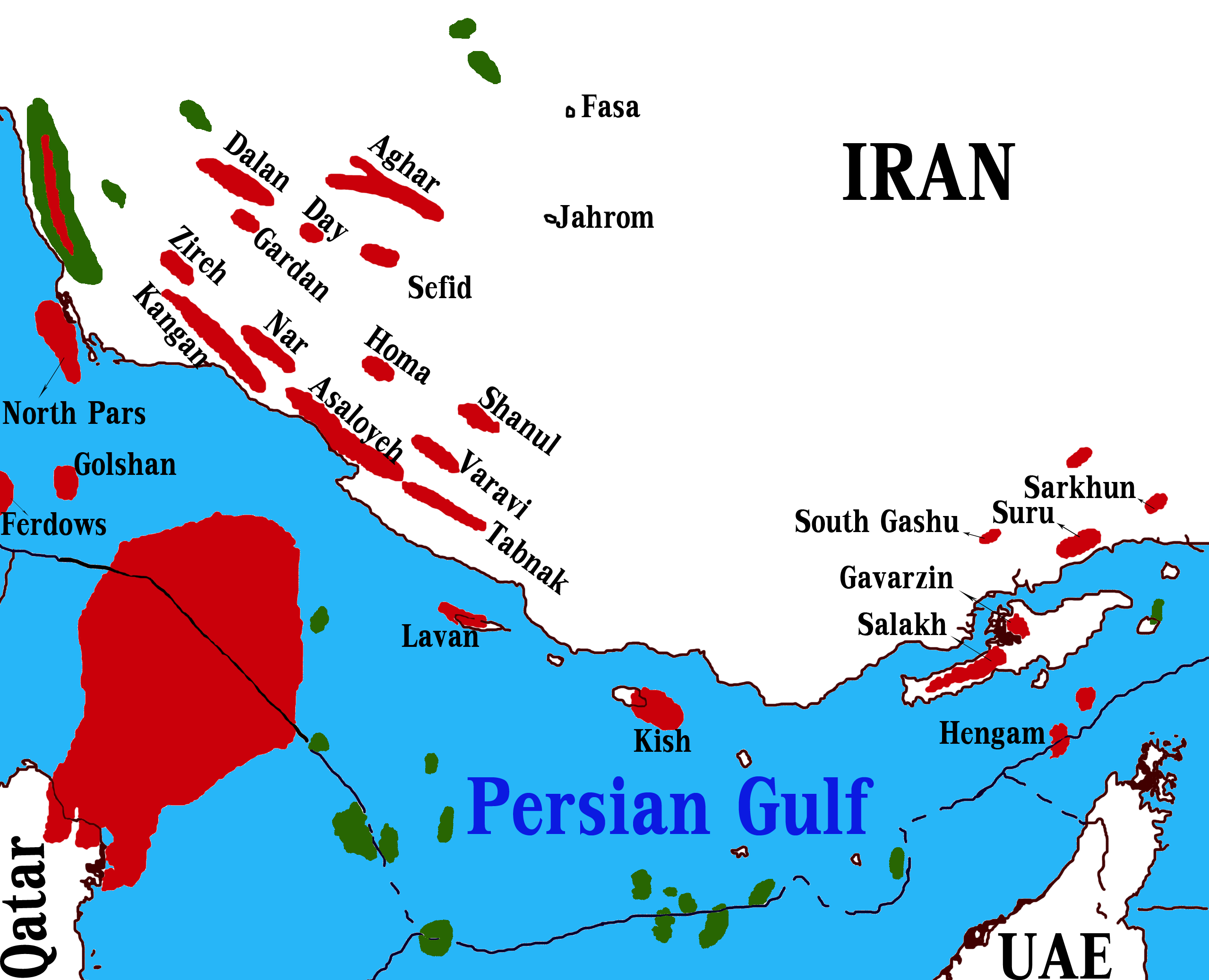
Iran Gas Fields Location Map

Kish gas Field is a giant gas field close to Kish Island in the Persian Gulf.

It is one of the NIOC Recent Discoveries which was discovered in 2006 and holds 66×10^{12} cu ft (1,900 km^{3}) of gas in place of which 50×10^{12} cu ft (1,400 km^{3}) is recoverable. The field also holds at least 1 billion barrels (160,000,000 m^{3}) of condensate of which at least 331 million barrels (52,600,000 m^{3}) are recoverable.

The field gas is sweet, it contains 50-80 PPM hydrogen sulphide. The field has the potential of producing 4000 million cubic meters of natural gas per day.

In February 2010, an Iranian consortium headed by Bank Mellat signed a $10-billion agreement with the National Iranian Oil Company (NIOC) to develop the Kish gas field. The gas field will produce 85 million cubic meters of natural gas per day

== See also ==
- World Largest Gas Fields
- NIOC Recent Discoveries
- Iran Natural Gas Reserves
- North Pars
- South Pars Gas Field
- Golshan Gas Field
- Ferdowsi Gas Field
- Persian LNG
