= List of oil and gas fields of the Barents Sea =

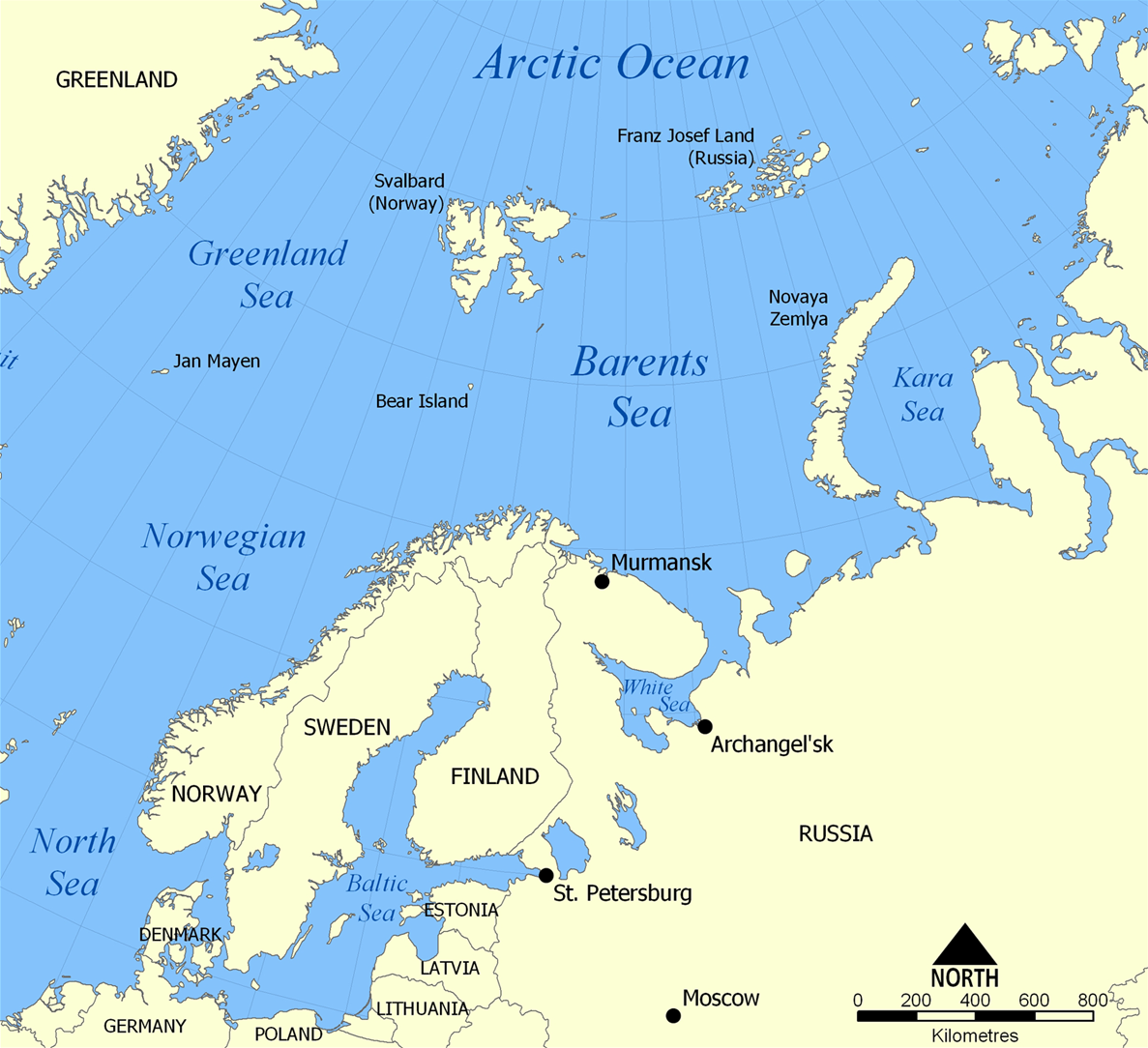
Location of the Barents Sea

This list of oil and gas field of the Barents Sea contains links to the major oil and gas fields beneath the Barents Sea. The Barents Sea is bordered by the north Norwegian and Russian coasts, the Novaya Zemlya, Franz Josef Land and Svalbard archipelagos, and the eastern margin of the Norwegian Sea.

In terms of hydrocarbon exploration, the area is divided into the Russian side on the East and the Norwegian side on the West, with the two also showing quite different petroleum geology. The Russian side contains a number of very large gas fields contained in Upper Jurassic sandstone reservoirs, bounded by anticline structures, whereas the Norwegian side contains much smaller Middle-Lower Jurassic sandstone reservoirs bounded by fault blocks. Some of the largest discoveries were made in the 1980s but have still not been brought into production because of a combination of the extreme conditions, political instability and the historical low price of gas.

== List of fields ==
=== Norway ===
- Snøhvit field - The first offshore field to be brought into production in the Barents Sea, includes Snøhvit, Askeladd and Albatross discoveries.
- Johan Castberg field - Formerly Skrugard-Havis field.
- Goliat field - First oil field to be discovered in the Norwegian side of the Barents Sea.

=== Russia ===
- Shtokman field - a giant gas field.
- Prirazlomnoye field
- Ludlovskaya field
- Murmanskoye field
- Ledovoye field

== See also ==
- Barents Basin
- Energy in Norway
- Energy in Russia
