= Urtabulak gas field =

Natural gas field in Uzbekistan

- Location within Uzbekistan
- Country: Uzbekistan
- Region: Qashqadaryo Region
- Offshore/onshore: Onshore
- Coordinates: 38.968°N 64.519°E
- Operators: Uzbekneftegaz; Tethys Petroleum (former)
- Service contractors: Baker Hughes; Eriell Group

Field history
- Discovery: 1963

Production
- Current production of oil: 1,100 barrels per day (~55,000 t/a)
- Year of current production of oil: Sep 2011
- Recoverable oil: 124 million barrels (~1.69×10^{7} t)
- Estimated gas in place: 23×10^{9} m^{3} (810×10^{9} cu ft)

The Urtabulak gas field (Russian: Уртабулас, romanized: Urtabulas Uzbek: Ўртабулоқ, romanized: Oʻrtabuloq) is a natural gas field located in South Uzbekistan near the Uzbekistan–Turkmenistan border. It was the site of a natural gas well blowout which led to the first use of a nuclear bomb to seal the well.

== Geology ==
The Urtabulak field consists largely of terrigenous sediment layers, with deposits from the Jurassic and Cretaceous present. Exploratory drilling did not uncover any rocks older than the Cenozoic at a depth of 3,430 m (11,253 ft). Sandstones and other similar rocks occupy the field to a depth of 400 m (1,312 ft), with limestones and salt anhydrides covering another 1,030 m (3,379 ft) below that layer, below which is largely marine sediment. Natural gas reserves were estimated at just over 23,000,000,000 m^{3} (8.1×10^{11} cu ft) in 1968. The Urtabulak field is considered to be a combination trap, with the gas trapped between an anhydride layer and limestone.

== Accident ==
On 1 December 1963, control during drilling in Well No. 11 in the Southern Urtabulak was lost at a depth of 2,450 m (8,038 ft) after encountering an area of abnormally high pressure natural gas, with pressures exceeding 300 atm (4,409 psi), alongside higher than expected concentrations of hydrogen sulfide. A combination of a wellhead that was not equipped with a blowout preventer and steel that did not have the chemical properties to resist corrosive environments caused the wellhead to fail. An ignition source set fire to the natural gas, ejecting the wellhead from wellbore and melting a portion of the drilling rig.

The fire went on to burn for 1,064 days, consuming an estimated 12,000,000 m^{3} (420,000,000 cu ft) of natural gas daily, and killed numerous wildlife. The head of the taskforce dedicated to extinguishing the fire, Kamil Mangushev, wrote in his diary that "At night, flocks of migrating birds and clouds of insects, attracted by the light, fell into this fiery dance of death and, falling down, burned, often before even reaching the ground". Attempts to quell the fire were unsuccessful; diverting the gas into nearby wells was hampered by the high hydrogen sulfide concentrations, the lower 1,000 m (1,094 yd) of the well had not yet been cemented either, alongside the exact location of the bottom of the well being unknown as it had not been logged at the time of the accident.

In 1966, detonating a nuclear charge near the well in order to shift the rock layers to seal the well was proposed. Employees of Design Bureau No. 11 in Sarov had already investigated in theory the use of peaceful nuclear explosions and were tasked with resolving the blowout in the Urtabulak gas field. By the fall of 1966, a specialised nuclear explosive with a yield of 30 kilotonnes of TNT (126 TJ) had been developed by the Design Bureau in Sarov for sealing the well. The explosive was lowered into an inclined well which had been drilled in order to try to achieve the closest proximity to the original well.

With approval from then-General Secretary of the Communist Party of the Soviet Union Leonid Brezhnev, the explosive was detonated at a depth of 1,500 m (1,640 yd) on 30 September 1966. The hole that the explosive was lowered into had also been sealed with cement so as to prevent atmospheric radioactive contamination. Just over twenty seconds later, the fire was successfully extinguished, the first time a peaceful nuclear explosion was used to seal a gas well. Almost two years later, a similar detonation with a yield of 47 kilotonnes of TNT (200 TJ) was successfully conducted at the nearby Pamuk gas field to seal another leaking well.

== Commercial operation ==
The discovery of the Urtabulak field was made as part of a larger discovery of hydrocarbons in the Amu-Darya basin, with the Gazli gas field being the first, having been discovered in 1956 with estimated reserves of 25,000 billion cu ft (7.1×10^{11} m^{3}). Operation of the field began in the 1960s prior to the accident, with exploratory drilling beginning in 1961. The discovery of hydrocarbons came in 1963, and the fire briefly paused commercial activities until 1969.

Baker Hughes under its Cyprian subsidiary operated the Northern Urtabulak under a Production Enhancement Contract (PEC) from 1999 to 2005 in partnership with Rosehill Energy. A Production Enhancement Contract stipulates that contractors must increase production of the assigned field by introducing modern, up-to-date technology and drilling techniques in exchange for a fifty-fifty split of the increased production. Baker Hughes was later charged with bribery under the Foreign Corrupt Practices Act in 2007, having been previously issued a cease-and-desist in 2001. The field was then managed by Canadian energy firm Tethys Petroleum, following the acquisition of the PEC rights in 2009 for US$6.5 million (equivalent to $9,754,537 in 2025) for the field from British firm Rosehill Energy. Tethys also specified in the share purchase agreement that Rosehill cover any legal fees as a result of potential damages by using the Baker Hughes name. Tethys duly fulfilled their duties to increase production by raising production up to 1,100 US bbl (131 m^{3}) per day in 2011, up from 913 US bbl (109 m^{3}) when Tethys acquired the PEC rights in 2009. Techniques employed to help increase production included radial drilling and the use of muriatic acid as a well stimulant. Tethys later announced in January 2014 that it would be exiting Uzbekistan, following accusations by the Uzbek government of crude oil theft.

== See also ==
- Nuclear Explosions for the National Economy
- Project Plowshare
