= List of locations and entities by greenhouse gas emissions =

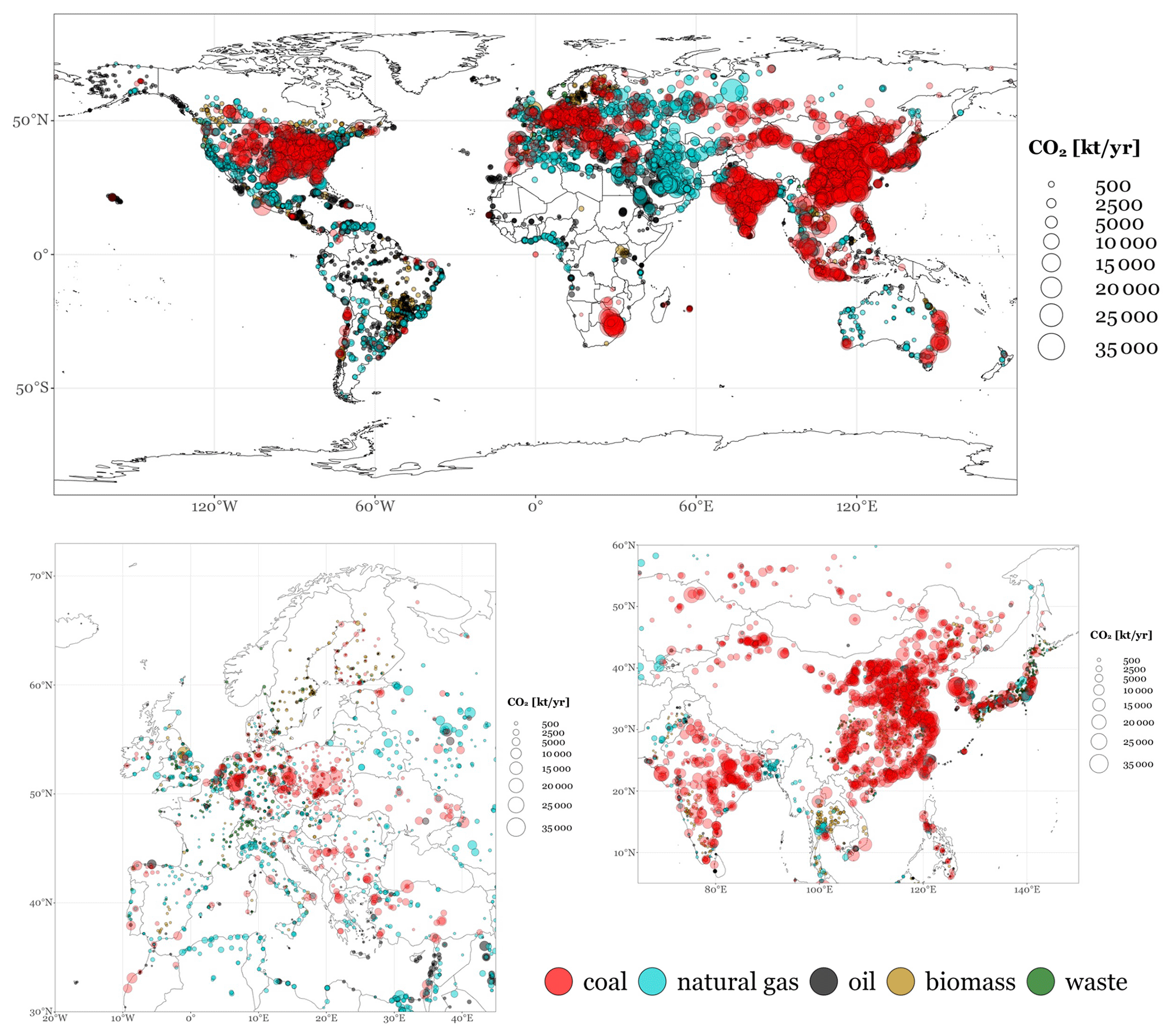
Emissions attributed to specific power stations around the world in 2018, color-coded by type of fuel used at the station. Lower half focuses on Europe and Asia

This article is a list of locations and entities by greenhouse gas emissions, i.e. the greenhouse gas emissions from companies, activities, and countries on Earth which cause climate change. The relevant greenhouse gases are mainly: carbon dioxide, methane, nitrous oxide and the fluorinated gases bromofluorocarbon, chlorofluorocarbon, hydrochlorofluorocarbon, hydrofluorocarbon, nitrogen trifluoride, perfluorocarbons and sulfur hexafluoride.

The extraction and subsequent use of fossil fuels coal, oil and natural gas, as a fuel source, is the largest contributor to global warming.

== Carbon dioxide ==
=== Countries ===
During June of 2023, with 12,705 million tonnes CO_{2} equivalent produced, China is the largest emitter; United States is second with 6,001, India 3,394, EU (which is 27 countries) 3,383, Russia 2,476, Japan 1,166, Brazil 1,057, Indonesia 1,002, Iran 893, and Canada 736.

=== Scope 1+3 emissions, cumulative of the years 1988 - 2015, from fossil fuel extraction ===
This section uses data from a climate accountability report of Heede of the Carbon Accountability Institute, and van Der Vlugt and Griffin of the Carbon Disclosure Project. While data of emissions "Direct operational" and indirectly caused from the companies surveyed were indicated by the CDP, requests for data which were ignored by companies and emissions resulting from the use of products originating with companies were included as estimates by the researchers. The data used by the CDP scientists is a composite of quantities of emissions as described via the GHG Protocol Corporate Standard (GHG): Scope 1 and Scope 3 emissions (not including Scope 2) - these three being all the possible Scope-emission types. 1 is direct emissions sources from a companies owned or possessed resources, 3 is indirect sources subsequential from production activities; these are divided by GHG Protocol Corporate Standard into types: upstream and downstream, and 15 categories. Scope 3 emissions are thought to be approximately 90% of the total from any company and result from the combustion of coal, and, or, oil, and, or, gas during the conversion of these into energy i.e. as fuel; which is categorized as a downstream. The relevant tables below have a ranking of 20 industrial greenhouse gas emitters from 1988 to 2015 from the Carbon Majors Database (CDP) report, a 10 July 2017 dataset of GtCO2e.

The table below shows the total combined (cumulative) emissions as a percentage of global emissions. Oil and gas production data was obtained from annual reports from company websites and the SEC (2016). For some state owned enterprises, data was sourced from the 'Oil & Gas Journal' (1986-2016) or is estimated from national statistics (EIA 2017, BP 2016, and OPEC 2016):

| Rank | Company | Country | Percentage |
|---|---|---|---|
| 1 | Saudi Arabian Oil Company (Aramco) | Saudi Arabia | 4.8% |
| 2 | Gazprom OAO | Russia | 4.2% |
| 3 | National Iranian Oil Co | Iran | 2.3% |
| 4 | ExxonMobil Corp | United States | 2.1% |
| 5 | Petroleos Mexicanos (Pemex) | Mexico | 2.0% |
| 6 | Shell plc | United Kingdom | 1.8% |
| 7 | BP PLC | United Kingdom | 1.7% |
| 8 | China National Petroleum Corp (PetroChina) | China | 1.6% |
| 9 | Chevron Corp | United States | 1.4% |
| 10 | Petroleos de Venezuela SA (PDVSA) | Venezuela | 1.3% |
| 11 | Abu Dhabi National Oil Co | United Arab Emirates | 1.2% |
| 12 | Kuwait Petroleum Corp | Kuwait | 1.0% |
| 13 | Total SA | France | 1.0% |
| 14 | Sonatrach SPA | Algeria | 1.0% |
| 15 | ConocoPhillips | United States | 1.0% |
| 16 | Petroleo Brasileiro SA (Petrobras) | Brazil | 0.8% |
| 17 | Nigerian National Petroleum Corp | Nigeria | 0.7% |
| 18 | Petroliam Nasional Berhad (Petronas) | Malaysia | 0.7% |
| 19 | Rosneft OAO | Russia | 0.7% |
| 20 | Lukoil OAO | Russia | 0.7% |
| SUM | | | 32.0% |

=== All cause 1+3 cumulative emissions ===
The Guardian newspaper (England, Britain) and Acciona (bracketed); both citing CDP:

| Rank | Company | Country | Percentage |
|---|---|---|---|
| 1 | China (Coal) | China | 14.32% (14.3%) |
| 2 | Saudi Aramco | Saudi Arabia | 4.50% (4.5%) |
| 3 | Gazprom | Russia | 3.91% (3.9%) |
| 4 | National Iranian Oil Company | Iran | 2.28% (2.3%) |
| 5 | ExxonMobil | United States | 1.98% (2.0%) |
| 6 | Coal India | India | 1.87% (1.9%) |
| 7 | Petróleos Mexicanos | Mexico | 1.87% (1.9%) |
| 8 | Russia (Coal) | Russia | 1.86% (1.9%) |
| 9 | Shell | United Kingdom | 1.67% (1.7%) |
| 10 | China National Petroleum Corporation | China | 1.56% (1.6%) |
| 11 | BP | United Kingdom | 1.53% |
| 12 | Chevron Corporation | United States | 1.31% |
| 13 | PDVSA | Venezuela | 1.23% |
| 14 | Abu Dhabi National Oil Company | United Arab Emirates | 1.20% |
| 15 | Poland (Coal) | Poland | 1.16% |
| 16 | Peabody Energy | United States | 1.15% |
| 17 | Sonatrach | Algeria | 1.00% |
| 18 | Kuwait Petroleum Corporation | Kuwait | 1.00% |
| 19 | Total | France | 0.95% |
| 20 | BHP | Australia | 0.91% |
| SUM | | | 47.2% |

==== Scope 3 ====
Scope 3 emissions are thought to be approximately 90% of the total from any company (Scope 1) and result from fuel combustion.

===== Vehicle emissions =====
Pickup trucks were found to produce the most emissions in a group of vehicles including SUVs and cars, in a survey reported January 2022. Excluding pickup trucks, the most polluting car type surveyed 2017 is the 2011 - 2020 Jeep Grand Cherokee which creates 372 grams per kilometre from the exhaust pipe, the 2007 - 2014 Audi R8 creates 346, thirdly the Chevrolet Camaro 335, the tenth most polluting, the Porsche Macan creates 291.

=== Largest sources carbon dioxide (Scope 1) ===
This part details most CO_{2} emissions for the year 2021 using Climate TRACE:

| Rank | Source | Emission (million tonnes) |
|---|---|---|
| 1 | Permian Oil and Gas Field, Texas, United States | 208.61 |
| 2 | Urengoyskoye Russia | 152.0 |
| 3 | North of Quebec, Canada logging operations | 126.77 |
| 4 | Marcellus, United States, oil and gas field | 124.38 |
| 5 | Bovanenkovskoye, Russia, oil and gas field | 122.69 |
| 6 | South Pars, Iran, oil and gas field | 118.09 |
| 7 | Zapolyarnoye, Russia, oil and gas field | 105.41 |
| 8 | Permian New Mexico, United States, oil and gas field | 93.12 |

=== Largest point source (Scope 1) ===
This section details production sites at single locations where the most pollution exists or existed in the recent past.

During March 2020, Secunda CTL, owned by Sasol, a synthetic fuel and chemicals from coal plant in Secunda, South Africa, was the producer of the single most emissions, at 56.5 million tonnes of CO_{2} a year. The Department of Forestry, Fisheries, and the Environment (DFFE) of the Government of South Africa determined Sasol has until 1 April 2025 to comply with the legal limits for emissions, as described by the Air Quality Act 2004:Part 3; 12; Category 3. Sasol's pledge to reduce its emissions from the plant by 10% by 2030 was reported during November 2020, during 2023 it was reported that this was amended to 30%.

As of 2021, the gas-fired power plant which emits the most was the Taichung Power Station in Taiwan, at 34.19 million tonnes CO_{2}.

== Methane ==
Sources of anthropogenic production are in the majority:

- natural gas, petroleum, and coal mining: the United States produced the most recent emissions from oil and gas sources at least prior to April 2023.
- livestock production systems; manure and enteric fermentation,
- waste deposit sites: landfills waste water

== Carbon bomb projects (new extractions) ==
A carbon bomb, or climate bomb, is any new extraction of hydrocarbons from underground whose potential greenhouse gas emissions exceed 1 billion tonnes of CO_{2} worldwide. In 2022, a study showed that there are 425 fossil fuel extraction projects (coal, oil and gas) with potential CO_{2} emissions of more than 1 billion tonnes worldwide. The potential emissions from these projects are twice the 1.5°C carbon budget of the Paris Agreement. According to these researchers, defusing carbon bombs should be a priority for climate change mitigation policy.

According to the same study, the Global Energy Monitor and "Banking on Climate Chaos" associations, between 2016 and 2022, the main backers of these climate bombs are the American banks JPMorgan Chase, Citibank and Bank of America.

Between 2020 and 2022, at least twenty new "climate bombs" went into operation, reveals an international journalistic investigation. In this survey, France's TotalEnergies is cited as the second most responsible group for fossil mega-fields, with a presence at 23 major hydrocarbon extraction sites. In November 2023, China's China Energy will lead the ranking and Saudi Aramco of Saudi Arabia will be third.

=== Examples ===
- Exploitation of new coal mines in Australia.
- Exploiting Canada's oil sands.
- Shale gas extraction, for instance in Permian basin in Texas

== See also ==
- Climate TRACE
- Non-linear effects
- Non-methane volatile organic compound
