= Kokdumalak gas field =

Gas field in Qashqadaryo Province, Uzbekistan

Kokdumalak
- Country: Uzbekistan
- Region: Qashqadaryo Province
- Offshore/onshore: onshore
- Operator: Uzbekneftegaz

Field history
- Discovery: 1956
- Start of production: 1960

Production
- Current production of gas: 12.8×10^{6} m^{3}/d 450×10^{6} cu ft/d
- Estimated gas in place: 343×10^{9} m^{3} 12×10^{12} cu ft

The Kokdumalak gas field is a natural gas field located in the Qashqadaryo Province. It was discovered in 1956 and developed by and Uzbekneftegaz. It began production in 1960 and produces natural gas and condensates. The total proven reserves of the Kokdumalak gas field are around 12 trillion cubic feet (343 km^{3}), and production is slated to be around 450 Million cubic feet/day (12.8×10^{5}m^{3}) in 2013.
