= Gazli gas field =

Natural gas field in Xorazm Province, Uzbekistan

Gazli gaz field
- Location within Uzbekistan
- Country: Uzbekistan
- Region: Bukhara region
- Offshore/onshore: onshore
- Coordinates: 40.13°N 63.46°E
- Operator: Uzbekneftegaz

Field history
- Discovery: 1956
- Start of production: 1961

Production
- Current production of gas: 13.7×10^{6} m^{3}/d 479×10^{6} cu ft/d
- Estimated gas in place: 714×10^{9} m^{3} 25×10^{12} cu ft

The Gazli gas field is a natural gas field located in the Bukhara Province. It was discovered in 1956 and developed by and Uzbekneftegaz. It began production in 1960 and produces natural gas and condensates. The total proven reserves of the Gazli gas field are around 25 trillion cubic feet (714 km^{3}), and production is slated to be around 479 Million cubic feet/day (13.7×10^{5}m^{3}) in 2013.

Gas is exported to Kazakhstan, Kyrgyzstan, Russia. Oil is used for local needs. Gas pipelines from the field go to Tashkent, the Urals, the Center of the European part of Russia.
