= Kyzyloi Field =

Gas field in Kazakhstan

- Location within Kazakhstan
- Country: Kazakhstan
- Offshore/onshore: onshore
- Coordinates: 46.1235733°N 58.0551052°E
- Operator: BN Munai LLP
- Partners: Tethys Petroleum Investments Limited

Field history
- Discovery: 1966
- Start of production: 19 December 2007

Production
- Current production of gas: 0.625×10^{6} m^{3}/d (22.1×10^{6} cu ft/d)
- Recoverable gas: 1.42×10^{9} m^{3} (50×10^{9} cu ft)

The Kyzyloi Field (Kazakh: Қызылой газ кен орны, Qyzyloı gaz ken orny) is a dry natural gas field in southern Kazakhstan about 65 kilometres (40 mi) to the north of the border with the Karalkalpak region of Uzbekistan and 55 kilometres (34 mi) to the north-west of the Aral Sea. It is a first gas field in Kazakhstan, which is operated by independent operator.

== Field specification ==
Kyzyloi Field, which covers 287 square kilometres (111 sq mi), was discovered in 1966. It contains sweet natural gas (97% methane) in shallow sandstones of Paleogene age at a depth of approximately 600 metres (2,000 ft). The net proved and probable economically recoverable reserves are approximately 1.42 billion cubic meter.

== Production ==
A commercial gas production commenced on 19 December 2007. The initial production capacity is 625,000 cubic metres per day (22,100,000 cu ft/d). All produced gas is sold to the gas trading company GazImpex and assigned to Kazakhstan's Petrochemical Company Kemikal LLP.

Gas is exported from the Kyzyloi field along a 56 square kilometres (22 sq mi) pipeline to Tethys' compressor station adjacent to the tie-in point to the major Bukhara-Urals export trunkline system where three gas fired compressors compress the gas into the trunkline. Compressors pump gas into the line at a pressure of up to 54 standard atmospheres (5,500 kPa).

== Operator ==
The field is developed and operated by BN Munai LLP, a subsidiary of Tethys Petroleum Investments Limited.
