= Yury Komarov (businessman) =

Russian businessman (born 1945)

Yury Alexandrovich Komarov
- Юрий Александрович Комаров
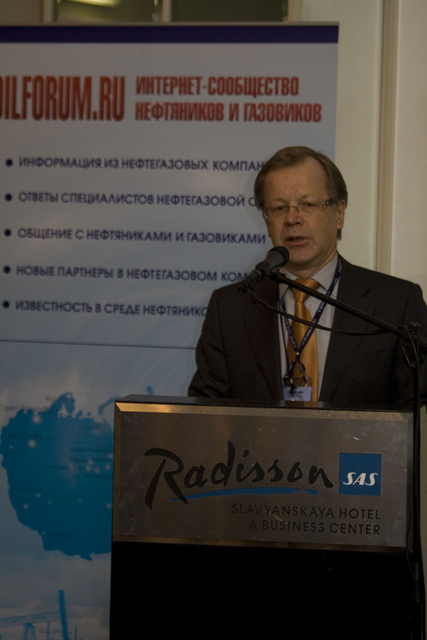
- Born: 1945 (age 80–81); Novosibirsk, Soviet Union
- Occupation: Businessman

Yury Alexandrovich Komarov (in Russian: Юрий Александрович Комаров, born 1945 in Novosibirsk, Soviet Union) is a Russian businessman.

== Career ==
In August 1996 – January 1999 he was the Director General of Gazexport, export subsidiary of Gazprom. In July–August 2002 he was the acting Director General of Gazexport. From 21 January 2002 until 12 May 2005 he was a Deputy Chairman of the Management Committee of Gazprom.

From October 2005 until February 2008 Komarov was a general director of Sevmorneftegaz, a subsidiary of Gazprom, which owns license to develop the Shtokman gas field. From February 2008 to April 2010 he was a head of Shtokman Development AG, the developer of Shtokman field.

Komarov is a member of the Coordination Committee of RosUkrEnergo.

In March 2004 he was appointed Representative of Russia in the business advisory council of Asia-Pacific Economic Cooperation forum for the 2004-2006 period by President Vladimir Putin.

Preceded by	Director General of Gazexport; August 1996 – January 1999	Succeeded by Yury Vyakhirev
Preceded by Oleg Siyenko	acting Director General of Gazexport; July–August 2002	Succeeded by Alexander Medvedev
