= Shurtan gas field =

Gas field in Qashqadaryo Province, Uzbekistan

Shurtan
- Country: Uzbekistan
- Region: Qashqadaryo Province
- Offshore/onshore: onshore
- Operator: Uzbekneftegaz

Field history
- Discovery: 1956
- Start of production: 1960

Production
- Current production of gas: 13.7×10^{6} m^{3}/d 479×10^{6} cu ft/d
- Estimated gas in place: 686×10^{9} m^{3} 24×10^{12} cu ft

The Shurtan gas field is a natural gas field and natural gas condensate in Uzbekistan. The total proven reserves of the Shurtan gas field are around 24 trillion cubic feet (686 km^{3}), and production is slated to be around 479 million cubic feet/day (13.7×10^{5}m^{3}) in 2013.
