= Samburgskoye gas field =

Russian natural gas field

Samburgskoye
- Country: Russia
- Region: Yamalo-Nenets Autonomous Okrug
- Offshore/onshore: onshore
- Operator: Novatek

Field history
- Discovery: 2006
- Start of development: 2006
- Start of production: 2012

Production
- Current production of gas: 2.6×10^{6} m^{3}/d 92.2×10^{6} cu ft/d
- Estimated oil in place: 15.7 million tonnes (~ 18.6×10^{6} m^{3} or 117 million bbl)
- Estimated gas in place: 97.8×10^{9} m^{3} 3.469×10^{12} cu ft

The Samburgskoye gas field is a natural gas field located in the Yamalo-Nenets Autonomous Okrug. It was discovered in 2006 and developed by Novatek. It began production in 2012 and produces natural gas and condensates. The total proven reserves of the Samburgskoye gas field are around 3.47 trillion cubic feet (97.8 billion m³), and production is slated to be around 92.2 million cubic feet/day (260,000 m³) in 2010.
