= Pyreinoye gas field =

Gas field in Yamalo-Nenets Autonomous Okrug, Russia

Pyreinoye
- Country: Russia
- Region: Yamalo-Nenets Autonomous Okrug
- Offshore/onshore: onshore
- Operator: Novatek

Field history
- Discovery: 2006
- Start of development: 2006
- Start of production: 2009

Production
- Current production of gas: 2.6×10^{6} m^{3}/d 92.2×10^{6} cu ft/d
- Estimated oil in place: 3.3 million tonnes (~ 3.91×10^{6} m^{3} or 24.6 million bbl)
- Estimated gas in place: 19.2×10^{9} m^{3} 681×10^{9} cu ft

The Pyreinoye gas field is a natural gas field located in the Yamalo-Nenets Autonomous Okrug. It was discovered in 2006 and developed by and Novatek. It began production in 2009 and produces natural gas and condensates. The total proven reserves of the Pyreinoye gas field are around 681 Billion cubic feet (19.2 billion m^{3}), and production is slated to be around 92.2 million cubic feet/day (260,000 m^{3}/d) in 2010.
