= East-Tarkosalinskoye gas field =

Gas field in Yamalo-Nenets Autonomous Okrug, Russia

East-Tarkosalinskoye
- Country: Russia
- Region: Yamalo-Nenets Autonomous Okrug
- Offshore/onshore: onshore
- Operator: Novatek

Field history
- Discovery: 1971
- Start of development: 1971
- Start of production: 1994

Production
- Current production of gas: 34.8×10^{6} m^{3}/d 1.23×10^{9} cu ft/d
- Estimated oil in place: 21 million tonnes (~ 24.8×10^{6} m^{3} or 156 million bbl)
- Estimated gas in place: 198×10^{9} m^{3} 7.013×10^{12} cu ft

The East-Tarkosalinskoye (Russian: восточно-таркосалинскго, romanized: Vostochno-Tarkosalinsky) gas field is a natural gas field located in the Yamalo-Nenets Autonomous Okrug. It was discovered in 1971 and developed by Novatek. It began production in 1994 and produces natural gas and condensates. The total proven reserves of the East-Tarkosalinskoye gas field are around 7.013 trillion cubic feet (198 billion m^{3}). Production peaked in 2006 and by 2023, Novatek had recovered 91% of the recoverable reserves.
