= Beregovoye field =

Gas field in Yamalo-Nenets Autonomous Okrug, Russia

Beregovoye Field
- Location within Russia
- Country: Russia
- Region: Yamalo-Nenets Autonomous Okrug
- Location: Purovsky District
- Offshore/onshore: Onshore
- Operator: Sibneftegaz
- Partners: Novatek; Itera

Field history
- Discovery: 1982
- Start of production: 2007

Production
- Recoverable oil (million tonnes): 9.035
- Recoverable gas: 324.211×10^{9} m^{3} (11.4494×10^{12} cu ft)

The Beregovoye Field is a natural gas field in the northeast of Purovsky District, Yamalo-Nenets Autonomous Okrug, Russia. The field is developed by Sibneftegaz, a joint venture of Novatek and Itera. Sibneftegaz holds the exploration and development license for the Beregovoy license area until 2023.

== History ==
The field was discovered in 1982 and it was named after Russian geologist Vladimir Beregovoi. It was to be developed by Sibneftegaz, a subsidiary of Gazprom. However, in late 1990s Gazprom lost control over Sibneftegaz and the main shareholder became Itera. The second largest shareholder became the Russian fertilizer producer Acron Group.

The field was ready for production in 2003; however, commercial production started only in 2007 after change in its ownership structure as Gazprom did not allowed produced gas to enter into the gas transportation system. In 2006, Gazprom through its banking arm Gazprombank bought back controlling stake (51%) in Sibneftegaz from Itera and commercial production started after that. In 2009, Itera bought Acron Group 21% stake in Sibneftegaz.

In December 2010, Novatek bought a 51% stake in Sibneftegaz from Gazprombank.

== Reserves ==
It has reserves of 324.211 billion cubic metres (11.4494 trillion cubic feet) of natural gas, 0.991 million tonnes of gas condensate, and 9.035 million tonnes of crude oil.

The field is connected by 32-kilometre (20 mi) pipeline with the Zapolyarnoye–Urengoi pipeline.
