= Sulige gas field =

Natural gas field in Inner Mongolia, China

Coordinates: 36°N 106°E

Sulige
- Location within China
- Country: China
- Region: Inner Mongolia
- Offshore/onshore: onshore
- Operator: China National Petroleum Corporation

Field history
- Discovery: 2000
- Start of production: 2006

Production
- Current production of gas: 37×10^{6} m^{3}/d 1.3×10^{9} cu ft/d 13.5×10^{9} m^{3}/a (480×10^{9} cu ft/a)
- Estimated gas in place: 1.68×10^{12} m^{3} 59.64×10^{12} cu ft

The Sulige gas field is a natural gas field located in Inner Mongolia, China. Discovered in 2000, it was developed by the China National Petroleum Corporation, determining it to have initial total proven reserves of around 59.6 trillion ft^{3} (1680 km^{3}). It began production of natural gas and condensates in 2006, with a production rate of around 1.3 billion ft^{3}/day (37×10^{5} m^{3}).
