= North-Urengoyskoye gas field =

Gas field in Yamalo-Nenets Autonomous Okrug, Russia

North-Urengoyskoye
- Country: Russia
- Region: Yamalo-Nenets Autonomous Okrug
- Offshore/onshore: Onshore
- Operator: Novatek

Field history
- Discovery: 1966
- Start of development: 1966
- Start of production: 1970

Production
- Current production of gas: 11.5×10^{6} m^{3}/d 407.8×10^{6} cu ft/d
- Estimated oil in place: 21.1 million tonnes (~ 25.0×10^{6} m^{3} or 157 million bbl)
- Estimated gas in place: 157.3×10^{9} m^{3} 5.58×10^{12} cu ft

The North-Urengoyskoye gas field is a natural gas field located in the Yamalo-Nenets Autonomous Okrug. It was discovered in 1966 and developed by and Novatek. It began production in 1970 and produces natural gas and condensates. The total proven reserves are around 5.58 trillion cubic feet (1.58×10^{11} m^{3}), and daily production was slated to be around 407.8 million cubic feet (11,550,000 m^{3}) in 2010.

According to a 2022 report by Climate TRACE, the North-Urengoyskoye gas field is the largest single source of greenhouse gas emissions in Russia. The field continues to operate amid increasing environmental scrutiny and sector-wide challenges related to international sanctions on Russia’s energy industry.
