= Margarita gas field =

Natural gas field in Gran Chaco Province, Bolivia

Margarita
- Country: Bolivia
- Region: Gran Chaco Province
- Offshore/onshore: onshore
- Operator: Repsol

Field history
- Discovery: 1998
- Start of production: 2004

Production
- Current production of gas: 6×10^{6} m^{3}/d 210×10^{6} cu ft/d 2.2×10^{9} m^{3}/a (78×10^{9} cu ft/a)
- Estimated gas in place: 371×10^{9} m^{3} 13×10^{12} cu ft

The Margarita gas field is a natural gas field located in the Gran Chaco Province of Bolivia. Discovered in 1998, it was developed by Repsol, determining it to have initial total proven reserves of the Margarita gas field are around 13 trillion ft^{3} (371 km^{3}). It began production of natural gas and condensates in 2004, with a production rate of around 210 million ft^{3}/day (6×10^{5} m^{3}).
