= Itaú-San Alberto gas field =

Natural gas field in the Tarija Department of Bolivia

Itaú-San Alberto
- Country: Bolivia
- Region: Tarija Department
- Offshore/onshore: onshore
- Coordinates: 21.9119°S 63.8443°W
- Operator: Total S.A.

Field history
- Discovery: 1998
- Start of production: 2004

Production
- Current production of gas: 5.7×10^{6} m^{3}/d 200×10^{6} cu ft/d 2×10^{9} m^{3}/a (71×10^{9} cu ft/a)
- Estimated gas in place: 581×10^{9} m^{3} 20.33×10^{12} cu ft

The Itaú-San Alberto gas field is a natural gas field located in the Tarija Department of Bolivia. Discovered in 1998, it was developed by Total S.A., determining it to have initial total proven reserves of around 20.33 trillion ft^{3} (581 km^{3} (139 cu mi)). It began production of natural gas and condensates in 2004, with a production rate of around 200 million ft^{3}/day (5.7×10^{5} m^{3}).
