= Kandym–Khausak–Shady–Kungrad project =

Gas field project in Uzbekistan

The Kandym–Khausak–Shady–Kungrad project is a project to develop natural gas fields in Uzbekistan. The project is carried out by a consortium of Lukoil (90%) and Uzbekneftegaz (10%).

== History ==
The production sharing agreement on the project was signed between Lukoil and Uzbekneftegaz on 16 June 2004 in Tashkent in the presence of the presidents of Russia and Uzbekistan. The agreement came into force on 24 November 2004 and will be in force until 2039. Output is to be shared on a fifty-fifty basis.

On 8 September 2005, the agreement on creating a consortium comprising Uzbekneftegaz, Lukoil, Petronas, Korea National Oil Corporation and China National Petroleum Corporation was signed in Tashkent. However, this agreement was not implemented.

The drilling of development wells in the Khausak gas field started on 1 July 2006. The Khausak field was inaugurated on 29 November 2007.

In March 2012, Lukoil signed a deal with a consortium of banks for a loan of up to US$500 million for the development.

== Development ==
Confirmed geological reserves of natural gas in the project area amount to 329 billion cubic metres (11.6 trillion cubic feet). The project was expected to produce 207 billion cubic metres (7.3 trillion cubic feet) of gas over its lifetime, with maximum annual output of 11 billion cubic metres (390 billion cubic feet) expected to be reached by 2013. Lukoil aimed for peak gas production at Kandym-Khauzak-Shady of around 47 million barrels per year (7.5×10^{6} m^{3}/a) of oil equivalent in 2018.

The project comprises a gas processing plant, plans for drilling more than 170 production wells and construction of 1,500 kilometres (930 mi) of pipelines. In addition, the project foresees construction of two compressor plants, gas gathering stations, shift camps, high-voltage power transmission lines and a separate 1,400 kilometres (870 mi) long railroad track, motorways and access roads.
