= Annerveen gas field =

Natural gas field in the Netherlands

Annerveen
- Country: Netherlands
- Offshore/onshore: onshore
- Operator: Nederlandse Aardolie Maatschappij BV

Field history
- Discovery: 1962
- Start of development: 1962
- Start of production: 1973

Production
- Current production of gas: 7.3×10^{6} m^{3}/d 257×10^{6} cu ft/d 2.57×10^{9} m^{3}/a (91×10^{9} cu ft/a)
- Estimated gas in place: 75.6×10^{9} m^{3} 2.669×10^{12} cu ft

The Annerveen gas field is a natural gas field located in the Netherlands. It was discovered in 1962 and developed by Nederlandse Aardolie Maatschappij BV. It began production in 1973 and produces natural gas and condensates. The total proven reserves of the Annerveen gas field are around 2.669 trillion cubic feet (75.6 billion m^{3}), and production is centered on 257 million cubic feet/day (0.73 million m^{3}). NAM announced that the field would be closed in 2021.
