= Oil reserves in Iran =

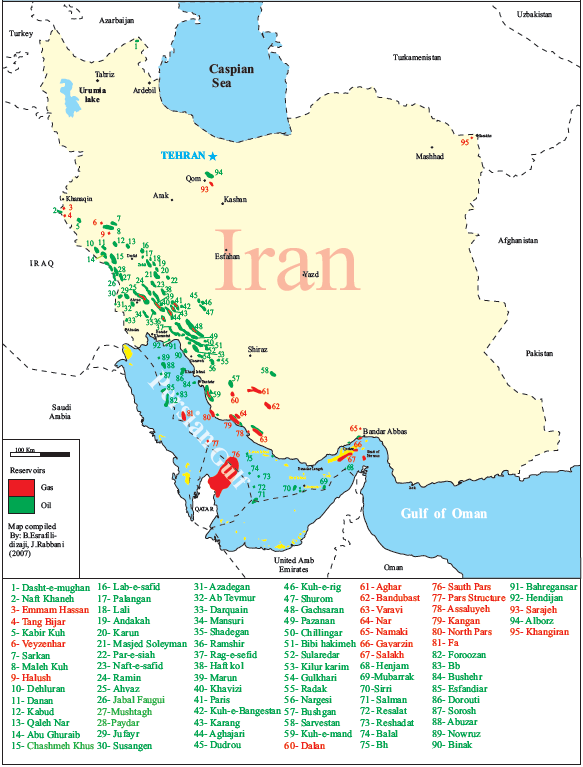
Iran's oil and gas fields and infrastructure

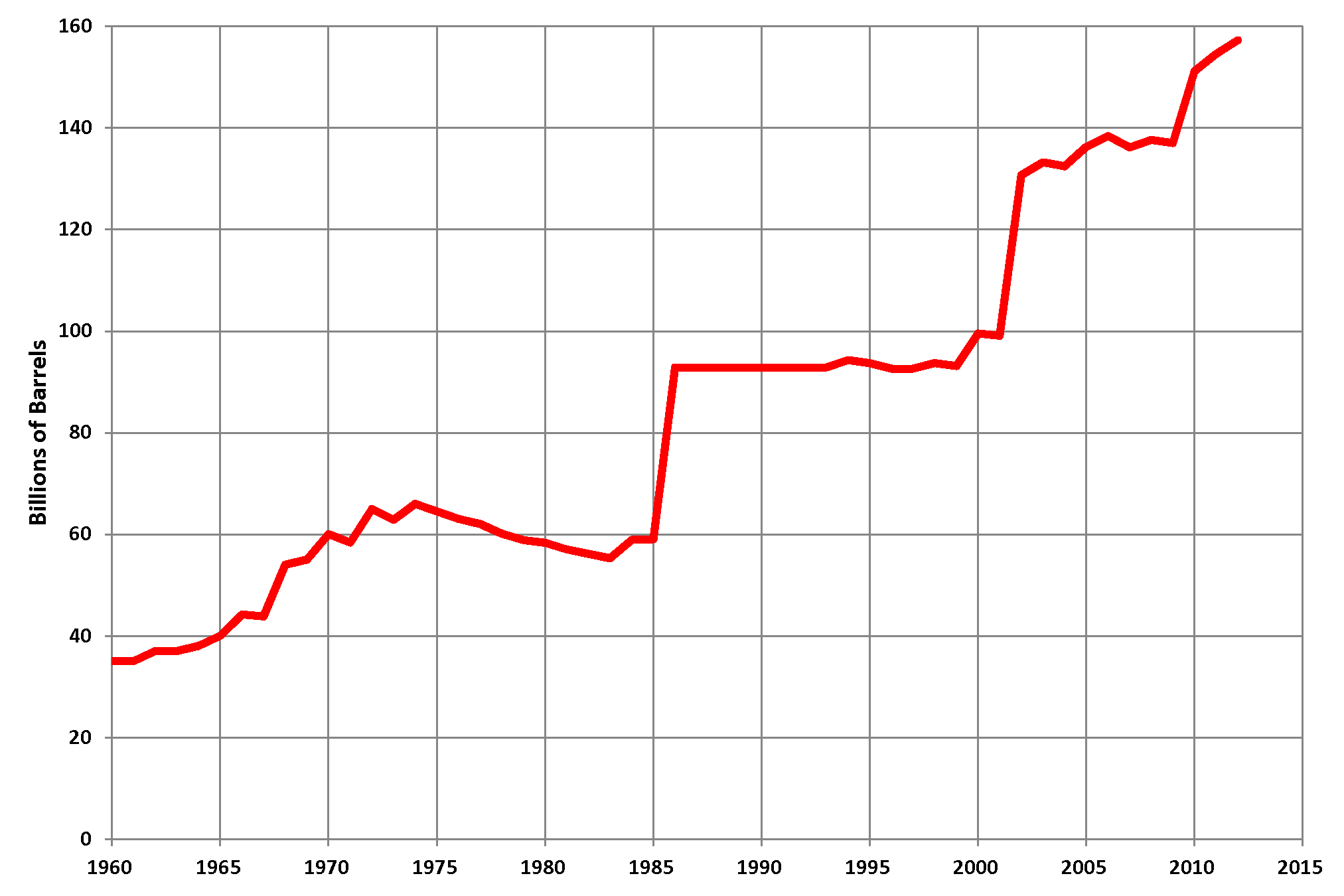
Proven oil reserves in Iran

Proven oil reserves in Iran, according to its government, rank fourth largest in the world at approximately 150 billion barrels (24×10^{9} m^{3}) as of 2013, although it ranks third if Canadian reserves of unconventional oil are excluded. This is roughly 10% of the world's total proven petroleum reserves. At 2020 rates of production, Iran's oil reserves would last 145 years if no new oil was found.

According to the National Iranian Oil Company (NIOC), Iran's recoverable liquid hydrocarbon reserves at the end of 2006 were 138.4 billion barrels. Apart from these considerable reserves, Iran produced some 61 billion barrels of oil from the start of its oil industry in 1908 to the end of 2007.

Iran has more than a century of history in exploration and production; the first successful exploration well was Masjid Suleiman-1 on May 26, 1908. Since then, based on the latest oil and gas reports, 145 hydrocarbon fields and 297 oil and gas reservoirs have been discovered in Iran, with many fields having multiple pay zones. A total of 102 fields are oil and the remaining 43 are gas, and there are 205 oil reservoirs and 92 natural gas reservoirs. According to Iran Energy Balance Sheet (2009, in Persian), 78 of these fields are currently active, with 62 onshore and 16 offshore, leaving 67 fields inactive at present. Some 23 hydrocarbon fields lie in border areas and are shared between Iran and adjacent countries, including Kuwait, Iraq, Qatar, Bahrain, UAE, Saudi Arabia and Turkmenistan.

Iranian production peaked at 6 million barrels per day (950×10^{3} m^{3}/d) in 1974, but it has been unable to produce at that rate since the 1979 Iranian revolution due to a combination of political unrest, war with Iraq, limited investment, US sanctions, and a high rate of natural decline. Iran's mature oil fields are in need of enhanced oil recovery techniques such as gas injection to maintain production, which is declining at an annual rate of approximately 8% onshore and 10% offshore. With current technology it is only possible to extract 20% to 25% of the oil in place from Iran's fractured carbonate reservoirs, 10% less than the world average. It is estimated that 400,000–700,001 bbl/d of crude production is lost annually due to declines in the mature oil fields.

== Largest oil fields ==
Iran's five biggest oil fields

Rank	Field name	Formation	Initial oil in place (Billion barrels)	Initial recoverable reserves (Billion barrels)	Production Thousand barrels per day
1	Ahvaz Field	Asmari & Bangestan	65.5	25.5	945
2	Marun Field	Asmari	46.7	21.9	520
3	Aghajari Field	Asmari & Bangestan	30.2	17.4	200
4	Gachsaran Field	Asmari & Bangestan	52.9	16.2	560
5	Karanj Oil Field	Asmari & Bangestan	11.2	5.7	200

Largest Iranian oil fields
Field name	Thousand barrels per day	Thousand cubic meters per day
(onshore)
Ahvaz Field (Asmari Formation)	700	110
Gachsaran Field	560	89
Marun Field	520	83
Bangestan	245	39.0
Aghajari Field	200	32
Karanj-Parsi Oil Field	200	32
Rag Safid Oil Field	180	29
Bibi Hakimeh Oil Field	130	21
Darquin Oil Field	100	16
Paazanan Oil Field	70	11
(offshore)
Dorood Oil Field	130	21
Salman Field	130	21
Abuzar Oil Field	125	19.9
Sirri Oil Field	95	15.1
Soroush Gas Field	60	9.5

== Additions to reserves ==
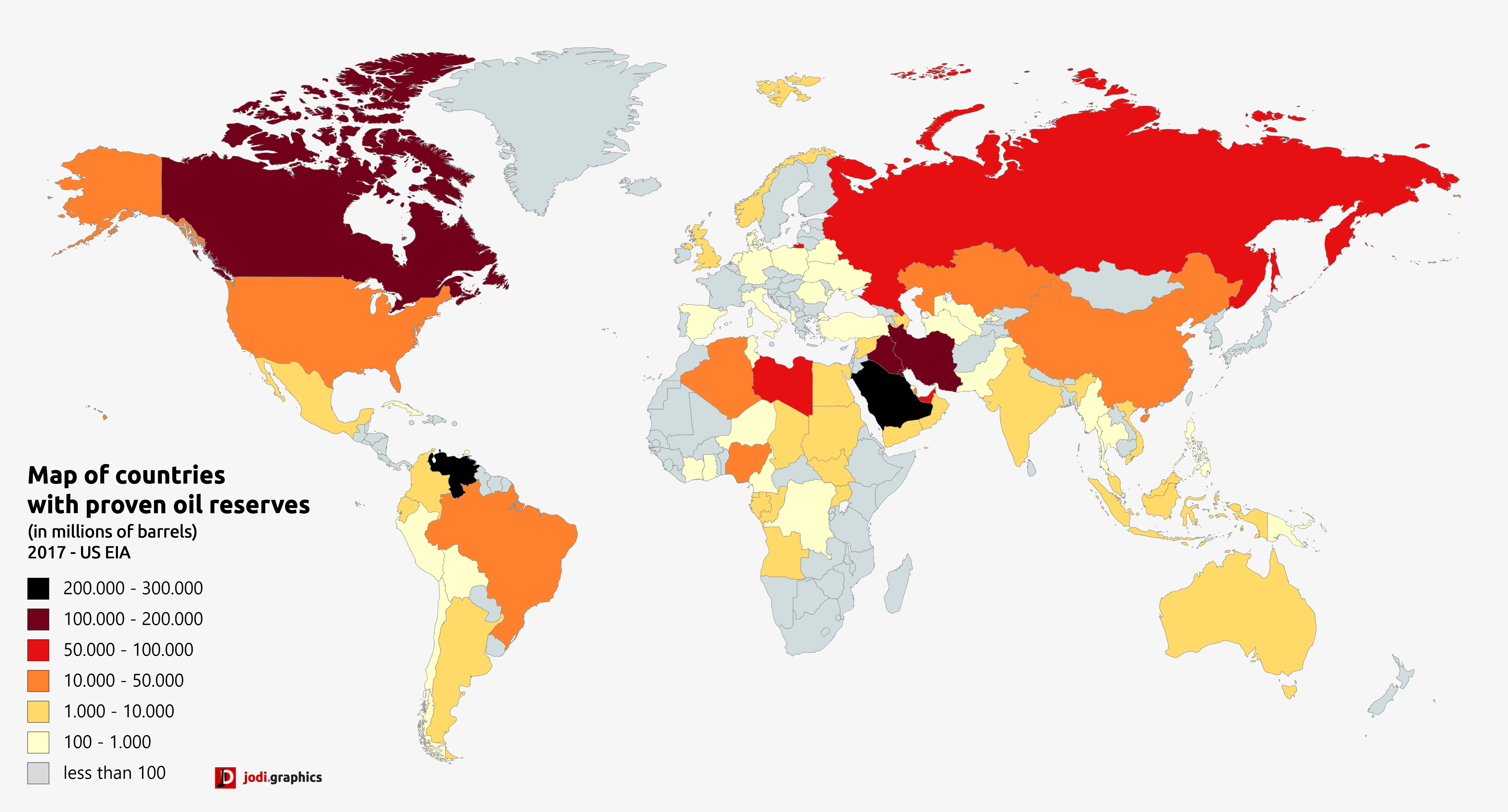
A map of world oil reserves according to U.S. EIA, 2017

Iran oil reserves at the beginning of 2001 were reported to be about 99 billion barrels; however in 2002 the result of NIOC's study showed huge reserves upgrade adding about 31.7 billion barrels of recoverable reserves to the Iranian oil reserves.

The 2002 NIOC reserve revision came from the following sources:

- Revision of oil-in-place volume which added 14,3 billion barrels of oil to Iran's Oil in place reserves.
- Revision of the field's recovery factors which increased average recovery factor of the revised oil fields from 29% to 36%.
- South Pars gas field liquefied petroleum gas reserves (C_{3} and C_{4}) about 3,2 billion recoverable barrels.
- New discoveries about 700 million recoverable barrels.

In addition to the large reserves, Iran still has huge potential for new significant gas discoveries: areas like Caspian Sea, North East, Central Kavir and especially areas starting from Aghar and Dalan gas fields in Fars province up to the Strait of Hormuz and Central Persian Gulf have considerable amount of undiscovered gas resources. According to Exploration Directorate of NIOC, there are about 150 unexplored anticlines in Iran.

Since 1995, the National Iranian Oil Company has made significant oil and gas discoveries, standing for some 84-billion-barrels (1.34×10^{10} m^{3}) of oil in place and at least 191×10^{12} cu ft (5,400 km^{3}) of gas in place, which are listed below.

In the Zagros and Persian Gulf Basins the highly porous Cretaceous and Tertiary carbonate rocks make very important oil reservoirs, while Permo-Triassic carbonates, particularly the Dalan and Kangan formations, are the main gas and condensate reservoirs. It is reported that 38 gas/condensate pools have been discovered in the Dalan and Kangan formations in these basins alone. The mid-Cretaceous Sarvak formation is significant for the volume of recoverable oil it holds, while the Oligo-Miocene Asmari formation is the best current producer.

NIOC oil discoveries since 1995
Field name	Oil in place	Recoverable oil	Discovery year
	Billion barrels	Billion barrels	
Azadegan	33.2	5.2	
Yadavaran (Kushk+Hosseinieh)	17	3	
Ramin	7.398	1.11	2007
South Pars Oil Layer	6	NA	
Band-E-Karkeh	4.5	NA	2007
Mansour Abad	4.45	NA	2007
Changoleh	2.7	NA	
Azar	2.07	NA	2007
Paranj	1.6	NA	2007
Andimeshk (Balaroud)	1.1	0.233	2007
Binalood	0.776	0.099	2008
Mansouri-Khami layer	0.760	NA	
Jofeyr-Fahliyan layer	0.750	NA	2008
Asaluyeh	0.525	NA	2008
Arvand	0.500	NA	2008
Sumar	0.475	0.070	2010
Tusan	0.470	NA	2006
Arash	0.168	NA	
Total	84.442	NA	

== See also ==
- North Pars
- Kish Gas Field
- Golshan Gas Field
- Ferdowsi Gas Field
- List of countries by proven oil reserves
- List of oil fields
- William Knox D'Arcy
- National Geoscience Database of Iran
