= Perla gas field =

Gas field in the Gulf of Venezuela

- Country: Venezuela
- Location: Gulf of Venezuela
- Block: Cardon IV
- Offshore/onshore: Offshore
- Partners: Repsol YPF; Eni

Field history
- Discovery: 1976
- Start of production: 2013

Production
- Estimated gas in place: 16,300×10^{9} cu ft (460×10^{9} m^{3})
- Producing formations: Lower Jurassic shelf limestone

Perla gas field is a giant offshore gas field in the Gulf of Venezuela. It is located south of Gela field, about 50 kilometres (31 mi) offshore at the Cardon IV block in water depths about 60 metres (200 ft). It covers area about 33 square kilometres (13 sq mi).

== History ==
The field was discovered in 1976. Exploration activities were carried out in 2009. The Pearl-1 well, drilled by the jack-up rig Ensco 68, encountered a 60 m (200 ft) hydrocarbon column with a production capacity of about 600,000 cubic metres per day (21,000,000 cu ft/d) of gas and 500 barrels per day (79 m^{3}/d) of gas condensate. Perla-2 produced 1.4 million cubic metres per day (49×10^{6} cu ft/d) of gas and 1,500 barrels per day (240 m^{3}/d) of condensate, Perla-3produced 1.9 million cubic metres per day (67×10^{6} cu ft/d) of gas and 1,350 barrels per day (215 m^{3}/d) of condensate, and Perla-4 produced 17 million cubic feet per day (480×10^{3} m^{3}/d) of gas and 560 barrels per day (89 m^{3}/d) of condensate. In total, it is expected to hold more than 16.3 trillion cubic feet (460 billion cubic metres) of natural gas.

At the phase I light offshore platforms will be installed to utilise the wells already drilled. A pipeline will be installed to a central processing facility located onshore. The phase I is expected to cost of US$1.4 billion.

The field will be developed by consortium of Repsol YPF (50%) and Eni (50%) . The front-end loading will be carried out by Foster Wheeler. The field is expected to come onstream by the first half of 2013. The development contract will be in force until 2036.
