= Deltana Platform =

Natural gas field offshore Tobejuba Island, Venezuela

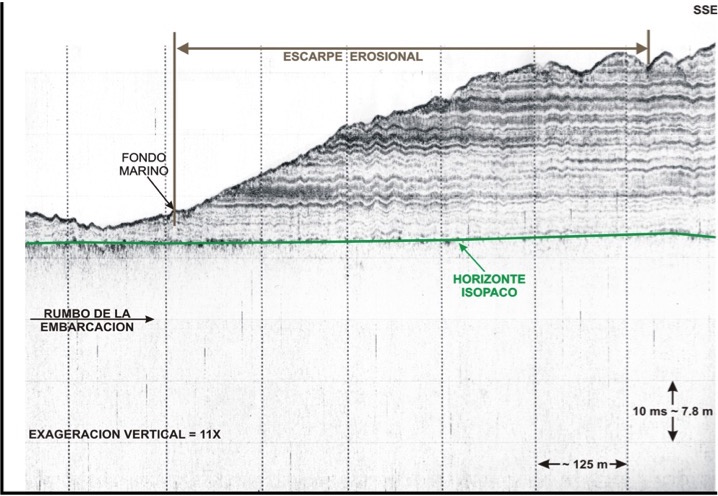
Pinguer 3.5 kHz. Showing abrupt erosional slopes and scarps

The Deltana Platform is a natural gas field located offshore of Tobejuba Island in the Delta Amacuro state of Venezuela. It is located about 90 km northeast of the island and approximately 233 km southeast of Güiria, the capital city of Sucre State, Venezuela.

== Geology ==
The water depths range from about 66 m in the southwest up to 308 m in the northeast, with an average slope of approximately 0.4% (0.25 grades) to the east-northeast. The relief of the seabed is generally irregular and includes frequent scarps related with faulting and erosion.

The seabed in general is composed mainly of very soft clays. The geologic features in this area include normal faults with northwest-southeast orientation, a system of exposed and buried reefs that cross the area from the northwest toward the southeast, gas pockets trapped in faults and shallow strata at different levels of depth, paleo-channels, abrupt erosional slopes and scarps associated with submarine debris flows and faulting. Several side scan sonar targets are interpreted as scattered small debris.
