= Sampaguita gas field =

Natural gas field in the South China Sea

Sampaguita
- Country: Philippines
- Region: South China Sea
- Offshore/onshore: Offshore
- Operator: Forum Energy
- Partners: Monte Oro

Field history
- Discovery: 1970

Production
- Estimated gas in place: 2,600×10^{9} cu ft (74×10^{9} m^{3})

The Sampaguita gas field is a natural gas field located in the South China Sea and concession SC72. Initially explored in 1970, three wells have been drilled to date and two produced gas.

In 2002, SC72 was awarded to Sterling Energy Ltd. In 2005, Forum Energy acquired the concession from Sterling and became its operator, and in 2008 Monte Oro acquired a 30% interest from Forum Energy.

A survey done in 2012 indicated that the field contained contingent resources of 2.6 trillion cubic feet (TCF). Another survey done later in 2015 estimated prospective resources in the area directly north of the field but within the same concession to be 3.1 TCF.

The field came under force majeure in 2014 due to a maritime border dispute between China and the Philippines (see: South China Sea Arbitration). This was lifted in 2016 by the government of the Philippines, and reinforced again in 2022.
