= Cisco Springs Oil Field =

Oil field in Utah, USA

Coordinates: 39°04′30″N 109°21′19″W

The Cisco Springs Oil and Gas Field is located in Grand County, Utah.

The field produces mostly natural gas from the Dakota and Morrison Formations at depths ranging from 1,200 feet (370 m) to 2,200 feet (670 m).

== Current operators ==
The Cisco Springs field is currently operated by Running Foxes Petroleum, Inc. a Denver, Colorado-based independent company. Running Foxes owns 100% of the field. The field at present primarily produces oil from the Dakota 1 sand located along the western flank of a northwest plunging anticline that is crosscut by northeast-trending faults. Gas production has temporarily ceased due to low product prices.
