= Persian LNG =

Persian LNG is the LNG project in Iran. It has been defined based on the reserves of the South Pars gas field. The project is developed by the National Iranian Gas Export Company.

== Technical description ==
Persian LNG project consists of development of phases 13 and 14 of South Pars Gas field and construction of two LNG trains each with capacity of 8.1 million tonnes per year. Liquefaction process was to be based on the Shell-Double Mixed Refrigrant Process.

The plant will be located in Tombak port (50 km North West of Asaluyeh and 15 km South East of Kangan) and will be connected with South Pars by 135 kilometres (84 mi) long subsea pipeline with diameter of 32 inches (810 mm).

The project is expected to cost US$10 billion and the LNG plant is expected to be commissioned by 2012. The project is in FEED stage.

The LNG plant was to be fed by gas from the South Pars phase 13; however, it was decided to be replaced by other phases.

== Project company ==
Project was originally seen as a partnership of NIOC (50%), Royal Dutch Shell (25%) and Repsol YPF (25%). In 2010, Shell and Repsol were excluded from the project.

== See also ==
- World Largest Gas Fields
- NIOC Recent Discoveries
- Iran Natural Gas Reserves
- South Pars Gas Field
- North Pars Gas Field
- Golshan Gas Field
- Ferdowsi Gas Field
