= Sakhalin-III =

Oil and gas development in Sakhalin Island, Russia

Sakhalin-III project East-Odoptu, Ayashsky, Veninsky and Kirinsky fields
- Country: Russia
- Region: Sakhalin
- Offshore/onshore: offshore

The Sakhalin-3 (Russian: Сахалин-3) project is an oil and gas development in Sakhalin Island, Russia. It includes four blocks (East-Odoptu, Ayashsky, Veninsky and Kirinsky) containing 5.1 billion barrels (810×10^{6} m^{3}) of crude oil and 46 trillion cubic feet (1.3×10^{12} m^{3}) of natural gas.

The Veninsky field is being developed by Venineft, a joint venture of Rosneft (79.5%) and Sinopec (21.5%). It has oil reserves of 1.2 billion barrels (190×10^{6} m^{3}) and 9.1 trillion cubic feet (260×10^{9} m^{3}) of natural gas.

Kirinsky gas and condensate field is being developed by Gazprom Dobycha Shelf, a subsidiary of Gazprom. Kirinsky field is located 28 kilometres (17 mi) offshore Sakhalin Island in the Sea of Okhotsk in water depths of approximately 90 metres (300 ft). It has gas reserves about 3.6 trillion cubic feet (100×10^{9} m^{3}). The field is expected to be commissioned in 2014. In addition, Gazprom owns the East-Odoptu and Ayashsky licences.

Chevron Corporation, ExxonMobil, and Rosneft got the licence to operate Sakhalin-3 under a production sharing agreement granted in 1993. The licence was revoked and re-tendered in 2005 under a normal tax regime.

In June 2009, Prime Minister of Russia Vladimir Putin invited Royal Dutch Shell to participate in the Sakhalin-3 project.

There are current talks of a Sakhalin VI project.

== See also ==
- Sakhalin-I
- Sakhalin-II
- Petroleum industry in Russia
