= Noxal oil field =

Underwater oil field in the Gulf of Mexico

- Country: Mexico
- Region: Gulf of Mexico
- Offshore/onshore: Offshore

Production
- Estimated oil in place: 10,000 million barrels (~1.4×10^{9} t)
- Estimated gas in place: 245×10^{9} cu ft (6.9×10^{9} m^{3})

Noxal is a deep underwater oil field in the Mexican waters of the Gulf of Mexico that was once believed to contain up to 10 billion barrels (1.6 billion cubic metres) of crude oil. Further drilling has revealed a modest 245 billion cubic feet (6.9 billion cubic metres) a modest natural gas find. The region is still expected to contain 10 billion barrels (1.6 billion cubic metres) of oil and natural gas equivalent. The field lies 4,000 metres (13,000 ft) below the sea bottom, which is itself 930 metres (3,050 ft) below sea surface, about 100 kilometres (62 mi) off the coast of Veracruz state.

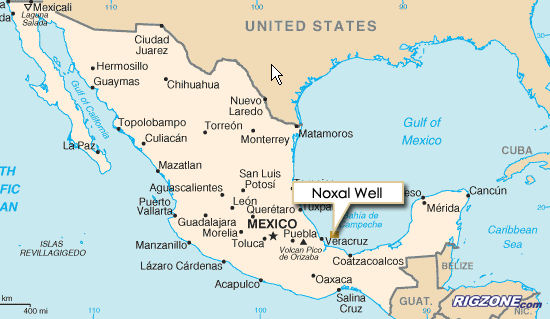
The Noxal Oil Field located off the Veracruz Coast

== Research ==
In December 2005, the quest to drill into the Gulf began with the intent to replace the dwindling supply of oil from the Cantarell field. Pemex, a Mexican petroleum company, began their first deepwater research and discovered Noxal and Lakach. Noxal, located in the Catemaco Folded Belt, was the first ever deepwater oil well found by Pemex. The news about this discovery went public in 2006. When tests were conducted at four different intervals, they confirmed the well was indeed filled with natural gas, containing 10 billion barrels of oil. After the success of the Noxal oil field, Pemex drilled into the second oil field it discovered, Lakach. Noxal and Lakach are just a few of many oil fields that have been discovered and ready to be drilled into so Pemex can bring these gases to land. However, at the time of the discovery of both of these oil fields, Pemex encountered issues due to having no knowledge or experience with deepwater drilling. Pemex was also not allowed to have outside help due to the nationalization of oil reserves in Mexico. This was one of the reasons for the country's decline in the production of oil in the first place.

While Noxal was announced as a major oil field, it turned out to be non-existent or unprofitable for development.

== Drilling ==
The Noxal-1 well (3,115 feet deep) was drilled by Diamond Offshore Drilling, a Texas-based company. The drilling started on 8 December 2005.
