= Anyue gas field =

Natural gas field in Sichuan, China

Anyue
- Country: China
- Region: Sichuan
- Offshore/onshore: onshore
- Operator: Sinopec

Field history
- Discovery: 2014
- Start of production: 2014

Production
- Current production of gas: 11×10^{6} m^{3}/d 383×10^{6} cu ft/d
- Estimated gas in place: 440×10^{9} m^{3} 15.4×10^{12} cu ft

The Anyue gas field is a natural gas field located in the central Sichuan basin of China. Discovered in 2014, it was developed by Sinopec, determining it to have initial total proven reserves of around 15.4 trillion ft^{3} (440 km^{3}). It began production of natural gas and condensates later that year, with a production rate of around 383 million ft^{3}/day (11×10^{5} m^{3}).
