= North Pars Gas Field =

Iranian gas field in the Persian Gulf

- Country: Iran
- Offshore/onshore: Offshore
- Operators: NIOC

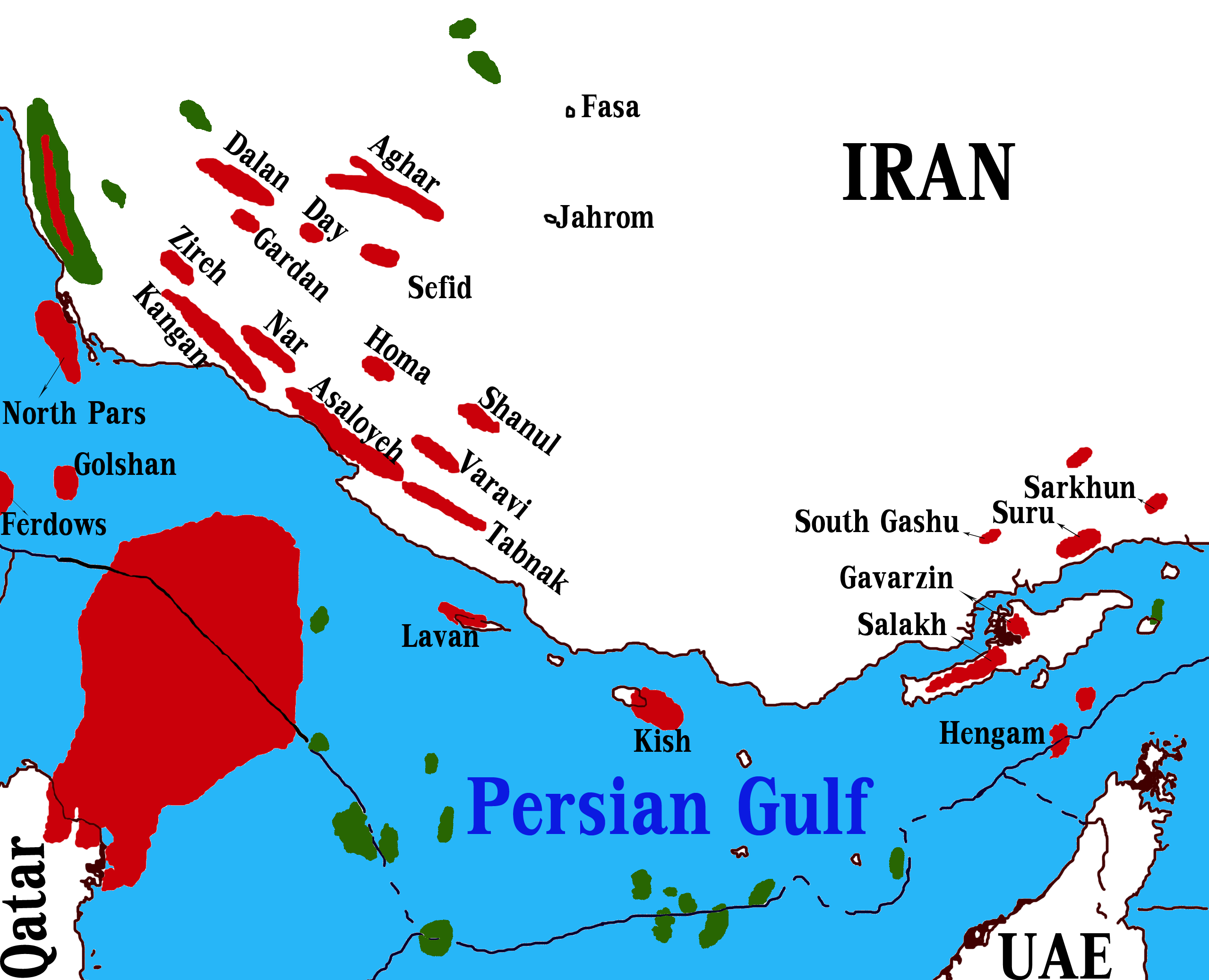
Map

North Pars Gas Field (Persian: میدان گازی پارس شمالی) is one of the biggest independent gas fields of the world. This field which was discovered in 1967 is located some 120 kilometers south east of Bushehr province in water depths of 2 to 30 meters in the Persian Gulf.

In 1963, exploration activities started in this field with carrying out seismic tests and the first exploration well was completed in 1967. The total volume of the gas in place of this field is about 58.9×10^{12} cu ft (1.67×10^{12} m^{3}) and the recoverable volume of sour gas is approximately 47.2×10^{12} cu ft (1.34×10^{12} m^{3}).

Filed gas is lean and sour, its Condensate Gas Ratio is 4 bbl (0.64 m^{3}) per 1000 cu ft and it contains around 6,000 ppm H_{2}S and 5% CO_{2}.

The first design to operate this field was approved in 1977 and after drilling 17 wells and installation of 26 maritime platforms and due to commencement of Islamic revolution and the imposed war the project was stopped.

At present, final studies for development of this field - 4 phases- equivalent to 3,600 million cubic feet per day (100,000,000 m^{3}/d) is under implementation. The whole recovered gas from this field will be used for producing 20 Mtpa of LNG

In September 2006, China's CNOOC signed a memorandum of understanding with NIOC for development of the North Pas field. The MoU was extended in December 2006, to incorporate development of a four-train LNG facility with a 20 mtpa capacity.

Final negotiations for development of North Pars gas field is going on with a Chinese company.

== See also ==
- World Largest Gas Fields
- NIOC Recent Discoveries
- Iran Natural Gas Reserves
- South Pars Gas Field
- Kish Gas Field
- Golshan Gas Field
- Ferdowsi Gas Field
- Persian LNG
