= Barents Basin =

Sedimentary basin in the Barents Sea

Coordinates: 71°N 46°E

The Barents Basin or East Barents Basin is a sedimentary basin underlying the eastern half of the Barents Sea. Lying off Russia on the continental shelf between the Kola Peninsula and Novaya Zemlya, it produces oil and gas.

The Barents Basin is bordered by land and the Timan-Pechora Basin to the south, the Murmansk Rise and Murmansk Plateau to the west, the Admiralty High and the island of Novaya Zemlya to the east, and rise of Franz Josef Land to the north. The Barents Basin is subdivided into the South Barents Basin (south of the Ludlov Saddle), the North Barents Basin, and the North Novaya Zemlya Basin. The latter two are separated by a major NW–SE fault.

== Geology ==
Beginning in the late Palaeozoic and continuing through to the early Cretaceous sediments were deposited on the continental shelf of the supercontinent Pangaea, these underlie the current Barents Basin which was created during the break-up of Pangaea. Beginning in the Cretaceous a rift zone opened between the Baltic Plate and the Siberian Plate, parallel to and west of the old Ural Mountains suture zone, represented here by Novaya Zemlya.

== Oil and gas ==
The largest natural gas fields in the basin are the Shtokman field (Shtokmanovskoye or Stokmanovskaya) and the Ludlovskoye (Ludlovskaya) field. The Shtokman field in the northwestern South Barents Basin was discovered in 1988 and has gas reserves of an estimated 2500 billion cubic meters. The Ludlovskoye field is on the Ludlov Saddle and was discovered in 1990. The Ledovoye field was discovered in 1991 and lies between the Shtokman field and the Ludlovskoye field.
