= Zapolyarnoye gas field =

Natural gas field in Russia

Zapolyarnoye
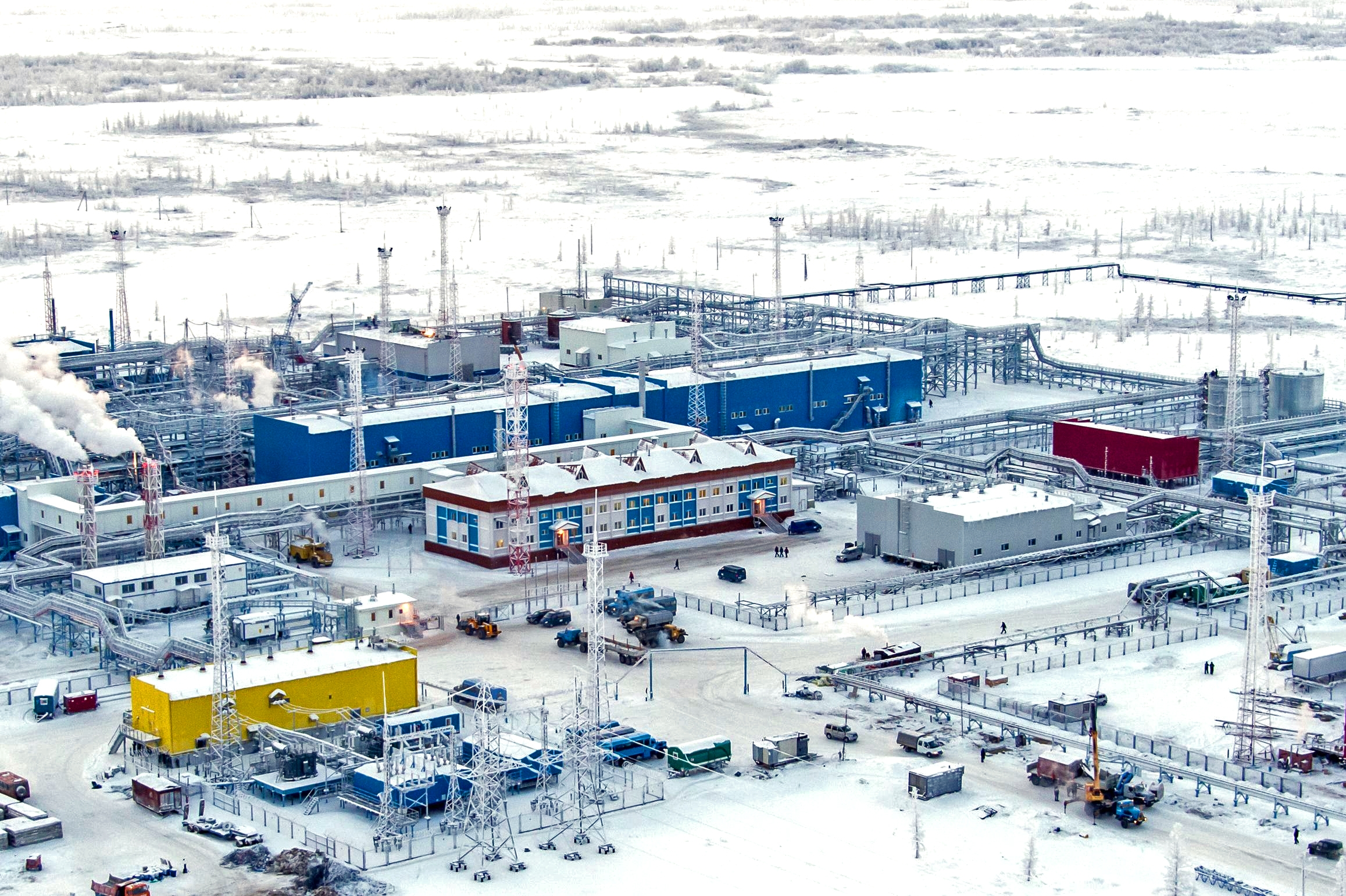
- Zapolyarnoye gas field

- Location within Yamalo-Nenets Autonomous Okrug Location within Russia
- Country: Russia
- Region: Yamalo-Nenets Autonomous Okrug
- Offshore/onshore: onshore
- Coordinates: 66.716667°N 78.783333°E
- Operator: Gazprom

Field history
- Discovery: 1965
- Start of development: 1994
- Start of production: 2001

Production
- Current production of gas: 17×10^{6} m^{3}/d 9.738×10^{9} cu ft/d
- Estimated oil in place: 9 million tonnes (~ 10×10^{6} m^{3} or 66 million bbl)
- Estimated gas in place: 2.3×10^{12} m^{3} 95×10^{12} cu ft

The Zapolyarnoye gas field is a natural gas field located in the Yamalo-Nenets Autonomous Okrug, Russia. It was discovered in 1965, and developed (and operated) by Gazprom. It began production in 2001 and produces natural gas, oil, and condensates. The total proven reserves of the Zapolyarnoye gas field are around 95 trillion cubic feet (2300 billion m³), and production is slated to be around 9.74 billion cubic feet/day (27.4 million m³) in 2010.

In 2017, an oil pipeline between Zapolyarnoye and Purpe was launched by Transneft. The pipeline can reportedly transfer up to 7.5 million tonnes of oil per year.
