= Tethys Petroleum =

Oil and gas company

Tethys Petroleum Limited
- Type: Public
- Industry: Oil and gas
- Number of locations: London, Aktobe, Grand Cayman
- Area served: Central Asia
- Products: Upstream oil services, oil and gas exploration and production
- Website: tethys-group.com

Tethys Petroleum Limited is an oil and gas company active in the field of exploration and production. The company is based in central Asia, mainly in Kazakhstan.

== Listing ==
Tethys Petroleum is a public company with its primary listing on the NEX board of the TSX Venture Exchange and is also listed on the Kazakhstan Stock Exchange (KASE).

The name comes from the fact that central Asian hydrocarbons are formed in the sedimentary rocks that filled the Tethys Ocean.
