= Shtokman field =

Russian arctic offshore gas field

- Location within Russia
- Country: Russia
- Region: Barents Sea
- Offshore/onshore: offshore
- Coordinates: 73°N 44°E
- Operators: Shtokman Development AG
- Partners: Gazprom, TotalEnergies, Equinor

Field history
- Discovery: 1988
- Start of production: Postponed Indefinitely

Production
- Estimated gas in place: 3,800×10^{9} m^{3} (130×10^{12} cu ft)

The Shtokman field (also Stockman field; Russian: Штокмановское месторождение), one of the world's largest natural gas fields, lies in the northwestern part of the South Barents Basin in the Russian sector of the Barents Sea, 600 kilometres (370 mi) north of Kola Peninsula. Its reserves are estimated at 3.8 trillion cubic metres (130 trillion cubic feet) of natural gas and more than 37 million tons of gas condensate.

== History ==
The Shtokman field was discovered in 1988. It was named after the Soviet geophysicist Vladimir Shtokman (Russian: Владимир Штокман).

In the early 1990s, Gazprom started talks with a group of five Western companies to participate in the field's development. In 1992, the foreign consortium was pushed out by the Rosshelf consortium, a Gazprom subsidiary that comprised 19 Russian companies. in August 1995, Gazprom and Rosshelf signed a letter of intent with Norsk Hydro of Norway, Conoco Inc. of the United States, Neste Oy of Finland, and TotalEnergies of France to evaluate the possible joint development of Shtokman field.

In January 1996, a project of a large floating liquefaction plant was designed, but this plan was abandoned and in March 2000, Rosshelf began developing plans for production and construction of a natural gas pipeline from the field via Murmansk to Vyborg. In 2001, Gazprom announced its intention to develop the gas field together with Rosneft. In 2002, the license for the field development and recovery was transferred from Rosshelf to Sevmorneftegas.

On 20 June 2005, Russia and Norway signed a number of agreements related to development of Shtokman field. On 28 June 2005 Russia signed a memorandum with France. In August 2005, Gazprom received bids from ConocoPhillips, ExxonMobil, Norsk Hydro, Statoil, Mitsui, Sumitomo Corporation, Royal Dutch Shell, Chevron Corporation, and TotalEnergies to develop the field. In September 2005, Gazprom selected five companies—Statoil, Norsk Hydro, TotalEnergies, Chevron and ConocoPhillips—as finalists in a search for partners to develop the field, but in October 2006 decided to reject all potential partners.

On 13 July 2007, Gazprom and French energy company TotalEnergies signed a framework agreement to organize the design, financing, construction and operation of the Shtokman phase one infrastructure. On 25 October 2007, similar contract was signed between Gazprom and StatoilHydro (later Statoil, now Equinor). The consortium of three companies, Shtokman Development AG, was established on 21 February 2008 in Zug, Switzerland.

Due to the global LNG oversupply and the United States shale gas, the shareholders of the project decided in 2010 to postpone it for 3 years. Based on this, the pipeline gas production might start in 2016 and LNG production in 2017.

The shareholders agreement expired on 30 June 2012 without development started. Statoil wrote off its investment into the project and handed shares back to Gazprom. In August 2012, Gazprom put the project on hold with a final investment decision on the first phase postponed until at least 2014, citing high costs and low gas prices. However, the company confirmed being in talks with foreign partners to find a new business model for the project. There are speculations that Royal Dutch Shell may become a project partner.

The Shtokman project was postponed indefinitely in May 2019, and Gazprom closed down the Shtokman Development AG.

== Development ==
The field so far was not developed owing to extreme Arctic conditions and the depth of the sea varying from 320 to 340 metres (1,050 to 1,120 ft). In September 2006, Gazprom completed drilling of appraisal well No. 7 in the field. Russian scientists have warned that the Shtokman's development may face problems as global warming unleashes vast icebergs into the Arctic. The Shtokman Development Company plans to address this challenge by using floating removable platforms, which can be moved around in case of emergency situations.

Originally it was planned to ship Shtokman's gas to the United States as liquid natural gas (LNG). Later it was indicated by Gazprom that the majority of produced natural gas would be sold to Europe via the planned Nord Stream 2 pipeline. For this purpose, the pipeline from the Shtokman field to the Murmansk Oblast and further via Kola Peninsula to Volkhov in the Leningrad Oblast will be built. The LNG plant will be laid in by the village of Teriberka, about 100 kilometres (62 mi) north-east of Murmansk.

The front-end engineering and design (FEED) is divided between different companies. The onshore transportation and technological complex, including an LNG plant, will be prepared by Technip. DORIS Engineering will prepare the subsea production system and the offshore technological platform. JP Kenny, a subsidiary of Wood Group, will design together with Rubin Design Bureau and Giprospetsgaz, a subsidiary of Gazprom, the 600 kilometres (370 mi) long 44 inches (1,120 mm) subsea pipeline from the Shtokman field to south of Murmansk. WorleyParsons and its subsidiary INTECSEA will perform FEED of the production vessel, which will process produced gas before transportation onshore.

== Geology ==
The main reservoir is of Upper Jurassic age, with a smaller amount of gas in the Middle Jurassic and the trapping structure is a large anticline, sealed by Upper Jurassic shales.

== Technical features ==
At the initial stage the project is expected to produce 22.5 billion cubic meter (bcm) of natural gas and 205,000 tons of gas condensate annually. Later the production is expected to increase up to 70 bcm of natural gas and 0.6 million tonnes of gas condensate. All extraction facilities will probably be located under water. The development costs are estimated at US$15 billion to US$20 billion, although according to the estimate by Alexander Medvedev, deputy chairman of Gazprom's management committee, the field's development costs will be only US$12 billion.

== Project company ==
The license to explore for and produce gas and condensate on the Shtokman field is owned by Russian company Gazprom Shelf Dobycha (formerly Sevmorneftegaz), a wholly owned subsidiary of Gazprom. Gazprom Shelf Dobycha is a sole customer for the design and construction of the field infrastructure, including a production complex, a pipeline network and an LNG plant, and has all marketing rights for hydrocarbons of the Shtokman field. Shtokman Development AG was to bear all financial, geological and technical risks related to the production activities. Gazprom owned 51% of shares in Shtokman Development, while TotalEnergies had 25% and Statoil 24% of shares. Head of the company was Yury Komarov. Shtokman Development was to own infrastructure for 25 years from field commissioning. Upon completion of phase one, TotalEnergies and Statoil should transfer their shares in Shtokman Development AG to Gazprom.
