= Golshan Gas Field =

Iranian gas field in the Persian Gulf

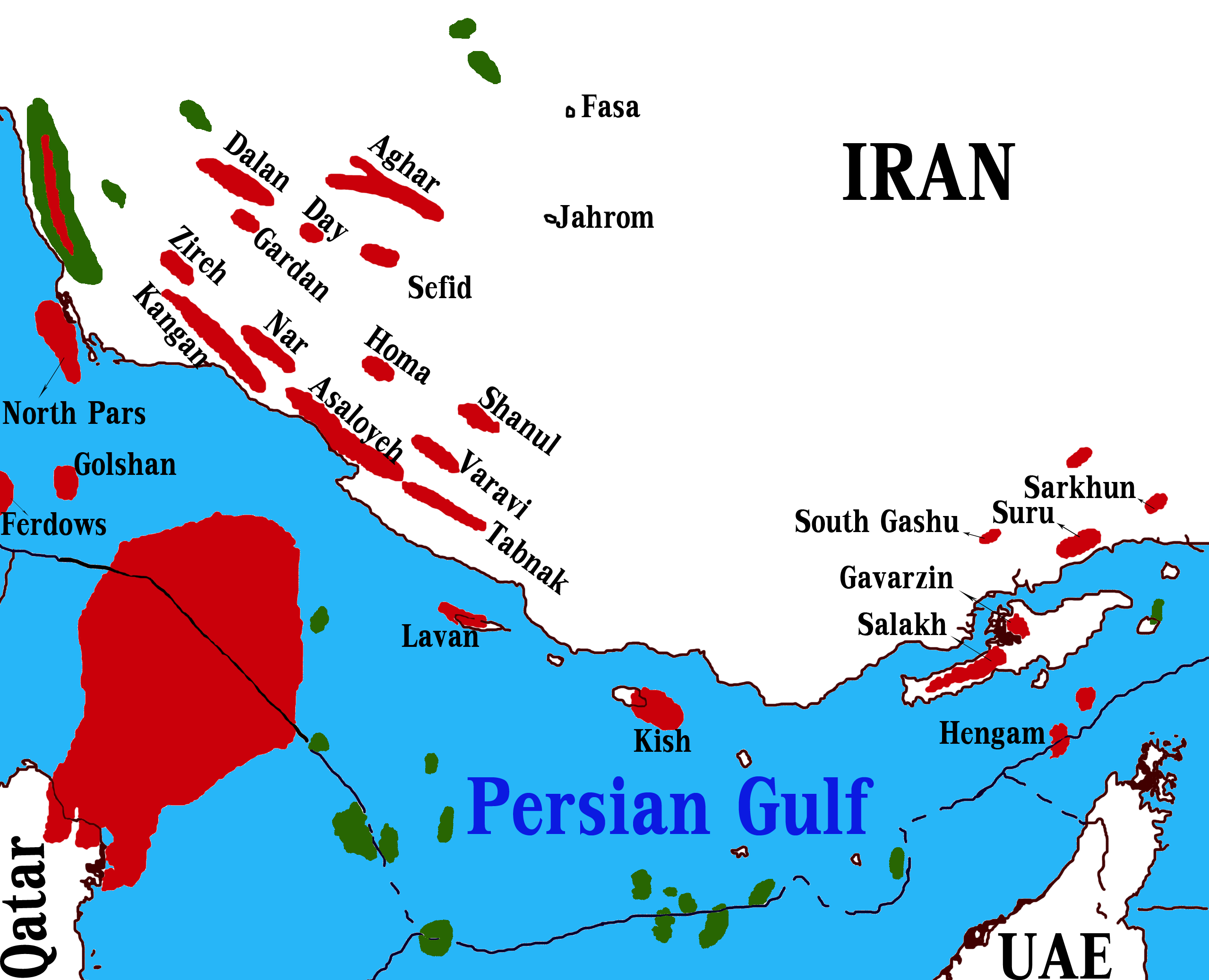
Iran Gas Fields Location Map

The Golshan gas field is one of the NIOC Recent Discoveries which is located at approximately 180 km south east of Bushehr, 65 km offshore the Persian Gulf. The volume of gas in place (GIP) of the field is estimated at 42 to 56 TCF.

On December 26, 2007, the contract for development of the field was signed between NIOC and SKS of Malaysia, in the presence of the Petroleum Minister of Iran.

== See also ==
- World Largest Gas Fields
- NIOC Recent Discoveries
- Iran Natural Gas Reserves
- South Pars Gas Field
- North Pars
- Ferdowsi Gas Field
- Persian LNG
