= Ferdowsi Gas Field =

Iranian gas field in the Persian Gulf

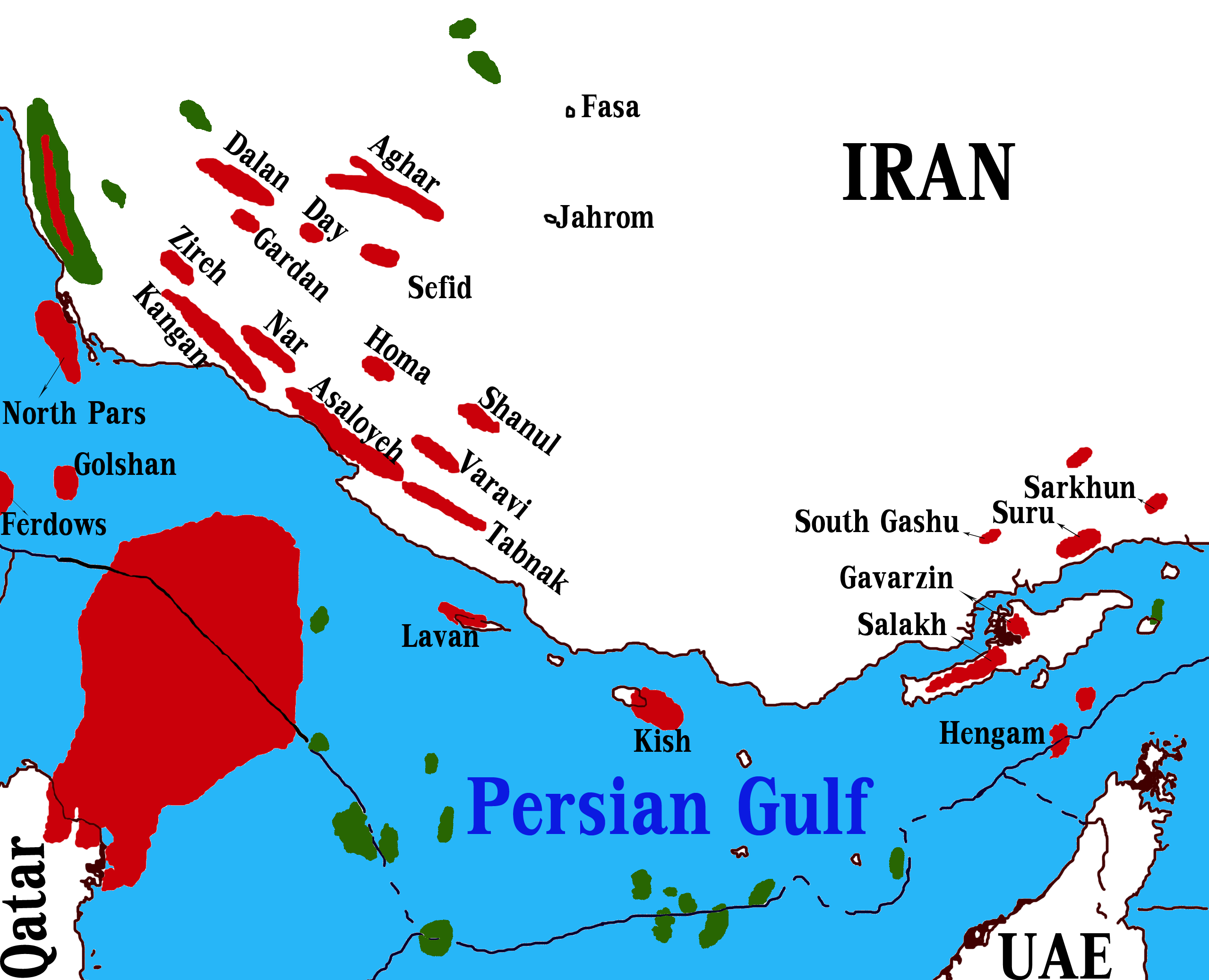
Iran gas fields location map

The Ferdowsi Gas Field is one of the NIOC Recent Discoveries, located at approximately 190 kilometers southeast of Bushehr, 85 kilometers off the coast of Iran, in the Persian Gulf.

The volume of gas and recoverable gas in this field is estimated at 13 and 9 trillion cubic feet (370×10^{9} and 250×10^{9} m^{3}), respectively.

On 26 December 2007, a contract for development was signed between the National Iranian Oil Company and the Malaysian SKS International Oil & Gas Co.

== See also ==
- World Largest Gas Fields
- Iran Natural Gas Reserves
- South Pars Gas Field
- North Pars
- Golshan Gas Field
- Persian LNG
