= Novatek =

Russian natural gas producer

Novatek PJSC
- Type: Public (ПАО)
- Traded as: MCX: NVTK; LSE: NVTK
- Industry: Oil and gas
- Founded: August 1994; 32 years ago
- Founder: Leonid Mikhelson
- Headquarters: Tarko-Sale, Russia
- Key people: Alexander Y. Natalenko (chairman of the board of directors); Leonid Mikhelson (chairman of the management board)
- Products: Petroleum; Natural gas
- Revenue: $17 billion (2025)
- Operating income: $3.3 billion (2025)
- Net income: $2.18 billion (2025)
- Total assets: $42.1 billion (2025)
- Total equity: $33.4 billion (2025)
- Number of employees: 5,997
- Website: www.novatek.ru/en/

Novatek (Russian: ПАО «НОВАТЭК», MCX: NVTK, LSE: NVTK) is Russia's second-largest natural gas producer (behind Gazprom), and the seventh-largest publicly traded company globally by natural gas production volume. The company was originally known as OAO FIK Novafininvest. Novatek is based in the Yamalo-Nenets Autonomous Region in West Siberia, and maintains a head office in Moscow. In the 2020 Forbes Global 2000, Novatek was ranked as the 316th-largest public company in the world.

== History ==
In 2006, the company produced roughly thirty billion cubic metres (1.1 trillion cubic feet) of natural gas. By 2010, production had grown to 37.2×10^{9} m^{3} (1.31×10^{12} cu ft), and in 2011 to 52.9×10^{9} m^{3} (1.87×10^{12} cu ft) In 2010, Novatek supplied 13% of the domestic market and accounted for 32% of non-Gazprom production. Total reserves amount to 9.4×10^{9} BOE (5.8×10^{10} GJ) using the Securities and Exchange Commission methodology. Regarding dry sales gas, Novatek operates only in the domestic market, which is characterized by artificially low prices. Novatek's earnings before interest, taxes, depreciation, and amortization and net profit margin in 2011 were 49% and 32%, respectively.

The major gas field owned by Novatek is the Yurkharovskoye field. On 27 May 2009, Novatek bought a 51% stake in Yamal LNG from Volga Resources, which controls the giant South-Tambeyskoye field. On 2 July 2010, Novatek purchased Tambeyneftegas, which holds the licence to the Arctic Malo-Yamalskoye field, located on the Yamal Peninsula and holding 161×10^{9} m^{3} (5.7×10^{12} cu ft) of natural gas and 14.4 million tonnes of gas condensate.

In June 2010 Novatek and Gazprom announced plans to build a liquefied natural gas plant in Yamalo-Nenets Autonomous Okrug. Total S.A. will also be involved as a 20% shareholder.

It was announced in July 2010 that, together with Total S.A., Novatek was developing the Termokarstovoye field in Yamal.

In December 2010, Novatek bought a 51% stake in Sibneftegaz from Gazprombank (Itera owns 49% of the shares). Sibneftegaz holds licences for exploration and production in the Yamal-Nenets region, including for the Beregovoye field, Pyreinoye field, Zapadno-Zapolyarnoye field, and the Khadyryakhinskiy licence area. Sibneftegaz owns rights to develop oil and gas condensate fields with a total resource of 395.53 bcm of natural gas and 8.44 million tonnes of gas condensate.

In 2011, Novatek was awarded licences to develop the Geofizichenskoye field, Salmanovskoye (Utrenneye) field, Severo-Obskoye field, and Vostochno-Tambeiskoye field.

In addition, Novatek acquired these companies:

- SNP Nova – pipeline construction
- Purneftegasgeologiya – natural gas
- Tarkosaleneftegas – natural gas
- Khancheyneftegas – natural gas
- Yurkharovneftegas – natural gas

Old company logo.

It was announced in 2013 that Novatek would develop the Sabetta port on the Yamal Peninsula, in a joint project with the Russian government to allow LNG exports by sea.

The final investment decision on Novatek's Arctic LNG 2 project on the Gyda Peninsula was made in March 2019.

In September 2021, Yamal SPG Resurs of Novatek acquired the Arkticheskoye and Neytinskoye fields for $10.88 billion and $2.28 billion, respectively, for further geological study of subsurface resources, exploitation, and production. A notable aspect of the auction sale was the participation of Novatek structures only.

Novatek has been ranked as being among the 13th-best of 92 oil, gas, and mining companies on indigenous rights in the Arctic. In 2021, Novatek was ranked no. 19 in the Arctic Environmental Responsibility Index (AERI) that covers 120 oil, gas, and mining companies involved in resource extraction north of the Arctic Circle. In 2022, the company's revenue amounted to 805 billion rubles.

After the 24 February 2022 Russian invasion of Ukraine, on 3 March, the London Stock Exchange declared it would suspend trading in GDR securities for Russian firms, and so Novatek was affected. Later on 7 February 2023, Novatek cancelled its (suspended) listing on the LSE.

Novatek exploitation of Arctic energy resources include the planned Arctic LNG 1, 2 and 3 liquefied natural gas plants which are being developed so that Novatek will become the main player in the Liquefied natural gas industry in Russia with plans to generate LNG capacity of 70 million tons per annum (MTPA) by 2030. The export of the Arctic LNG requires building Arc6 and Arc7 ice breaking LNG carriers.

Novatek was in the news in March 2024 when the Moscow Times disclosed that many European suppliers for its LNG projects in the Gulf of Ob had traded with it, seemingly in contravention of EU sanctions imposed in the wake of the 2022 Russian invasion of Ukraine. The total value of goods supplied exceeded 500 million euros, and the investigation identified goods from Italy, France, Germany, the Netherlands, and Spain.

In May 2024, Novatek launched the North Chaselskoye gas and condensate field in West Siberia, with an annual capacity of 3 billion cubic meters, aimed at supporting domestic needs and the upcoming Murmansk LNG project in northwestern Russia. This move, a response to EU and US sanctions, shifts the focus from Arctic operations to ice-free zones in the northwest, aligning with Gazprom's strategy to prioritize the domestic market amid geopolitical changes.

In 2025, the LNG carrier Aleksey Kosygin was launched, and entered service the same year it has a gross tonnage of 81,000 gross registered tons. The ship was built by the Zvezda Shipbuilding Complex, the tanker is intended for year-round LNG transportation via the Northern Sea Route as part of Novatek's Arctic LNG 2 project.

== Ownership ==
Novatek is a public company with shares traded on the Moscow stock exchange. The company delisted from the London Stock Exchange in March 2023. The major shareholders of Novatek are Leonid Michelson, the CEO, with around 28% of the shares, Gennady Timchenko's Volga Group with 23% of shares, Total S.A. with 16%, and Gazprom with 9.4%.

== Sanctions ==
On July 16, 2014, Novatek was placed on the Sectoral Sanctions Identification list by the U.S. Department of the Treasury following Russia's continued attempts to destabilize eastern Ukraine.

On January 29, 2018, CEO Leonid Mikhelson was named in a Countering America's Adversaries Through Sanctions Act report delivered to Congress.

On April 26, 2022, the Polish government imposed sanctions against NOVATEK and its Polish subsidiary Novatek Green Energy. In October, external management was introduced at the subsidiary. Leonid Mikhelson promised to appeal this decision in court. In April 2023, the Polish authorities announced the sale of the company's assets. Novatek Green Energy's revenue in 2021 was $382 million.

Sanctions against Russian banks have led to the cancellation of South Korean contracts to build Arc7 tankers, which are necessary for the Arctic 2 LNG plant, following missed payment deadlines in May 2022.

International sanctions against Arctic development impacted the Arctic 2 LNG plant development and its associated infrastructure when the USA sanctioned in November 2023 two vessels designed to serve as transhipment terminals.

== Controversies ==
In September 2021, CFO Mark Gyetvay was arrested in the United States. He allegedly hid $93 million worth of assets in offshore accounts. If convicted, he could face a decades-long prison sentence. He has since been released on a $80M bond. On March 28, 2023, a jury found Gyetvay guilty of hiding his foreign assets, defrauding the IRS, and failing to file tax returns between 2005 and 2015. He faces up to five years for each of the first two counts and an additional year for each return not filed. The verdict will be delivered on September 21. Gyetvay was sentenced to 86 months incarceration on that date.

In April 2022, former Deputy Chairman on the Board of Directors, Sergey Protosenya, reportedly stunned his wife and daughter with an axe and then stabbed them to death before hanging himself, at a luxury villa in Lloret de Mar, Spain. He had a fortune of over $400 million. Two other similar reports of gas company executives killing their wives and children emerged around the same time in Moscow. Investigators have not found evidence of third parties despite the case not looking like a typical murder-suicide. Novatek issued a statement casting doubt on a murder-suicide theory.

== See also ==
- Subsidiaries and affiliates of Total S. A.
- Liquefied natural gas industry in Russia
