= Uzbekneftegaz =

Uzbek state-owned oil and gas company

- Type: State owned
- ISIN: UZ7036270005
- Industry: oil and gas exploration and extraction
- Founded: 3 May 1992
- Headquarters: Tashkent, Uzbekistan
- Key people: Sidiqov Baxodirjon Baxromovich, Chairman of the Board (2023)
- Products: petroleum products, petrochemicals
- Revenue: US$3 billion (2014)
- Number of employees: 121,000 (2014)
- Website: http://www.ung.uz

The national holding company Uzbekneftegaz (Uzbek: "Oʻzbekneftegaz" MXK, Russian: НХК "Узбекнефтегаз") is a state-owned holding company of Uzbekistan's oil and gas industry.

== History ==
Uzbekneftegaz was established on May 3, 1992. In 1998, it was transformed into a national holding company.

In line with the reform process of the presidential administration under President Shavkat Mirziyoyev, Uzbekneftegaz is expected to go for an IPO. In December 2022 the Chairman of Uzbekneftegaz was one of a number of public officials who were ordered to work in emergency measures for two months, due to the gas crisis in the country.

== Operations ==
Uzbekineftegaz leads a consortium of Korea National Oil Corporation, China National Petroleum Corporation and Lukoil exploring and developing gas condensate fields in the Aral Sea. In February 2008, Uzbekneftegaz and consortium led by the Korea Gas Corporation established the joint venture Uz-Kor Gas Chemical to develop the Surgil gas field, containing about 133 billion cubic metres (4.7 trillion cubic feet) of natural gas, and build the Ustyurt gas-chemical complex. It will produce 4 billion cubic metres (140 billion cubic feet) of gas per year and about 500,000 tons per year of plastics as well as 100,000 tons of petrol which is derived as a bi-product in the process.

Together with another Korean company, Korea National Oil Corporation, Uzbekneftegaz explores Namangan-Tergachi and Chust-Pap oil fields in eastern Uzbekistan. In August 2008, Uzbekneftegas signed a cooperation agreement with Petrovietnam. It also cooperates with Lukoil in the Kandym-Khausak-Shady-Kungrad project to develop several natural gas fields in Uzbekistan.

Uzbekneftegaz together with China National Petroleum Corporation owns and operates the Uzbek section of the Central Asia–China gas pipeline. They also have a joint venture for developing the Mingbulak oilfield.

Together with Sasol and Petronas, Uzbekneftegaz develops Uzbekistan GTL, a gas-to-liquids (GTL) project. In June 2022 GTL launched a synthetic production plant.

In addition, Uzbekneftegaz has a production sharing agreement with Gazprom on gas exploration, joint ventures with Prista Oil on motor oil and lubricants production, and with Ariston Thermo on heating boilers production.
