= Təngərud =

Tangerud
- Municipality
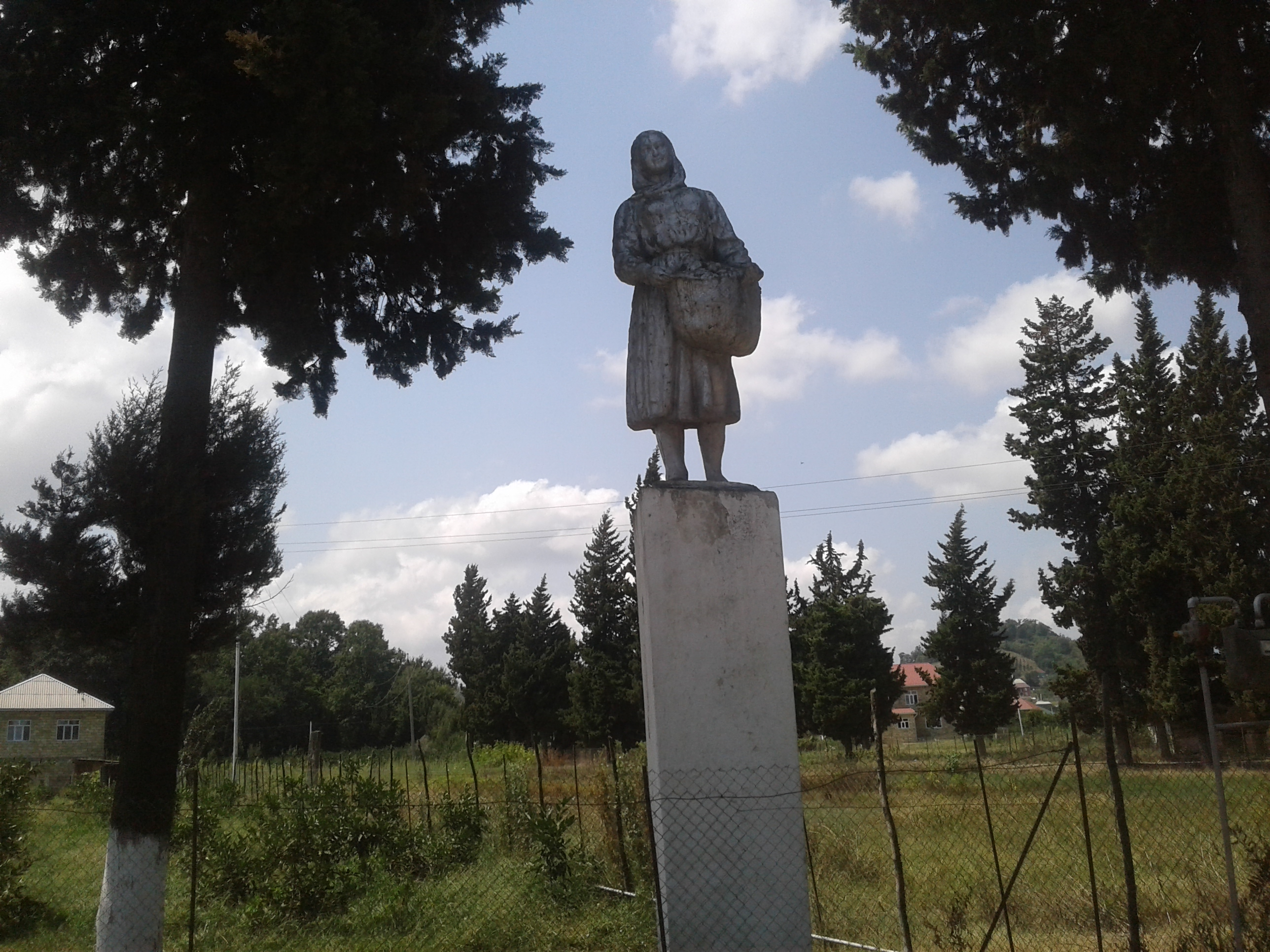
- Monument to a worker of a state-owned farm

- Location within Azerbaijan
- Coordinates: 38°34′48″N 48°49′06″E
- Country: Azerbaijan
- Rayon: Astara

Population
  - Total: 3,298
- Time zone: UTC+4 (AZT)
- Area code: 26

Təngərud (also, Tengerud, Təngərüd, Tangerud, and Tangyarud) is a village and municipality in the Astara Rayon of Azerbaijan. It has a population of 3,298.

== Etymology ==
Tengerud means "narrow river" in the Talysh language. The name comes from the name of the river in Tengerud. The river starts from the Talysh Mountains and flows into Caspian Sea.

== Location ==
Tengerud is located on the Baku–Astara highway. The neighborhood villages are Penser and Masxan. The distance between Astara city and Tengerud is 18 km, and between Baku city and Tengerud is 295 km. It is surrounded by the Talysh Mountains.

== Demographics ==
Majority (~98%) of total population is Talysh. The rest of the population are people from different regions of Azerbaijan and Iran.

== Religion ==
Nearly 100% population of Tengerud is Muslim and majority of this population belongs to Sunni branch of Islam. There is one mosque named after Ali and one madrasah for religion education of the local people of Tengerud.

== Education ==
School named after Samad Vurgun (Tengerud High School) was established in 1914. Later in 2007 the school got renewed with the support of Haydar Aliyev Fund. There are 2 buildings on school campus. Building N on the north side of the campus is for elementary school students and Building S on the south side of the campus is for middle school and high school students. Currently there are 719 students, 88 teachers and 35 classes in this school. Children under age 6 attend the Tengerud kindergarten located near Tengerud Hospital.

== Nature ==
There are more than 40 Natural Springs in Tengerud.

== Transportation ==
There are regular time buses to Baku, Astara and Lankaran cities from Tengerud.
