= Mirza Jabiyev =

Azerbaijani Red Army rifleman Hero of the Soviet Union (1925–1978)

Mirza Agamurad oglu Jabiyev
- Mirzə Ağamurad oğlu Cəbiyev
- Born: 22 February 1925; Hamoşam, Azerbaijan SSR, Soviet Union
- Died: 10 February 1978 (aged 52); Astara District, Azerbaijan SSR, Soviet Union
- Military career
- Allegiance: Soviet Union
- Branch: Red Army
- Service years: 1943–1946
- Rank: Captain
- Unit: 235th Rifle Division
- Conflicts: World War II; Operation Bagration; Battle of Königsberg
- Awards: Hero of the Soviet Union; Order of Lenin; Order of the Red Banner; Order of the Red Star; Order of Glory 3rd class

Mirza Agamurad oglu Jabiyev (Azerbaijani: Mirzə Ağamurad oğlu Cəbiyev; 22 February 1925 – 10 February 1978) was a Red Army captain, and a Hero of the Soviet Union. Jabiyev was awarded the title on 19 April 1945, for his actions in the Battle of Königsberg during the storming of Fort Five. He led his platoon in the storming of the fort and reportedly raised the red flag on the main tower of the fort. Jabiyev left the army in 1946, and became chairman of the village council and a kolkhoz director.

== Early life ==
Jabiyev was born on 22 February 1925 in Hamoşam to a peasant family, and he received lower secondary education; after graduating, he worked on the kolkhoz. Jabiyev's ethnicity is unclear, but he is described as either Talysh.

== World War II ==
Jabiyev volunteered for the Red Army in February 1943. His military service began in a reserve regiment, from which he was sent to a rifle division in Penza. At the beginning of 1944 he served with the 879th Rifle Regiment of the 158th Rifle Division. In February, during a battle near Bondar, Jabiyev protected his battalion commander from an exploding mine. Despite his wound Jabiyev reportedly evacuated his shell-shocked battalion commander from the battlefield under German fire. For his action, Jabiyev received the Order of Glory 3rd class on 15 February.

In late June, Jabiyev fought in the Vitebsk–Orsha Offensive, part of Operation Bagration. Between 23 and 27 June, during the breakthrough toward Vitebsk, he was the battalion commander's messenger. Under German fire, Jabiyev reportedly delivered orders to units on the front, then helped evacuate wounded while returning. He reportedly fought in the repulse of counterattacks and killed several German soldiers with machine gun fire. He was recommended for the Order of Glory 2nd class but the award was upgraded to the Order of the Red Star on 8 August.

In 1944, Jabiyev graduated from courses for junior lieutenants. He became a platoon commander in the 806th Rifle Regiment of the 235th Rifle Division. He fought in the Battle of Königsberg in April 1945. On 6 April, Jabiyev's platoon crossed the moat of Fort Five. The platoon cleared mines from the approaches, then blew up the wall and broke into the fort. The fighting lasted for days. On 8 April, Jabiyev reportedly raised the red flag on the main tower of the fort. He was wounded, but remained on the front, taking over command of the company. After the fort had been captured Jabiyev went to the field hospital. In subsequent street fighting in the city, the platoon was reported to have stormed several buildings, destroyed several German firing points, killed 100 German soldiers, and captured a large amount of equipment. Jabiyev reportedly killed eight German soldiers and captured thirteen. On 9 April, he was awarded the Order of the Red Banner for his actions on 6 April. On 19 April, he was awarded the title Hero of the Soviet Union and the Order of Lenin.

== Postwar ==
After the end of the war Jabiyev continued to serve in the army. In 1945 he joined the Communist Party of the Soviet Union. He left the army in 1946 with the rank of captain. Jabiyev was chairman of the Ashkenokerapskogo village council. In 1969 he graduated from the Lankaran Agricultural College. He worked as a kolkhoz director in Astara District. Jabiyev died on 10 February 1978 and was buried in Hamoşam.

In Hamoşam and Astara, there are busts of Jabiyev. A museum was opened in Hamoşam. In Kaliningrad Jabiyev's name is on the memorial to the heroes of the assault on Königsberg and on a memorial stele in Fort Five.
