= Digo =

Digo may refer to:

- the Digo people
- the Digo language
- Diqo, a village in Azerbaijan

DIGO may refer to:

- Drug-induced gingival overgrowth, a side-effect of some medicines
