= Ajamu Baraka =

American human rights activist

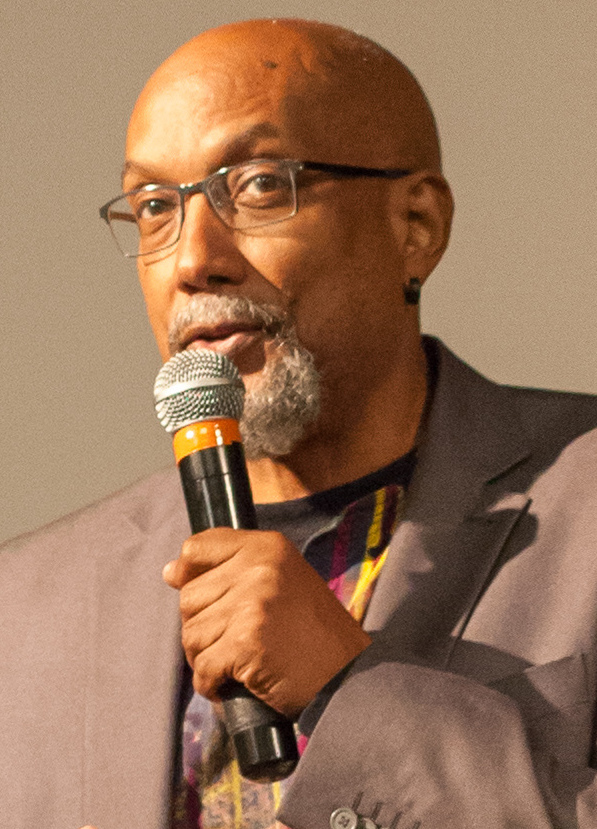
- Baraka in 2016

Personal details
- Born: Ajamu Sibeko Baraka; October 25, 1953 (age 73) Chicago, Illinois, U.S.
- Party: Green
- Education: City College of New York; University of South Florida (BA); Clark Atlanta University (MA, PhD)
- Website: Official website

Military service
- Allegiance: United States
- Branch/service: United States Army
- Battles/wars: Vietnam War

Ajamu Sibeko Baraka (/əˈʒɑːmuː bəˈrɑːkə/ ə-ZHAH-moo bə-RAH-kə; born October 25, 1953) is an American political activist. In 2016, he was the Green Party nominee for Vice President of the United States on the ballot in 45 (Note: Howie Hawkins stood in Baraka's place for Vice President on the ballot in Minnesota.) states and received 1,457,216 votes (1.07% of the popular vote).

Baraka currently serves as the national organizer and spokesperson for the Black Alliance for Peace.

== Early life ==
Baraka was born in 1953 and grew up on the South Side of Chicago. He served in the U.S. Army during the Vietnam War. Upon discharge, he moved to the southern United States, where he became involved in anti-segregation activism.

Baraka received his BA in international studies and political science from the University of South Florida, Tampa in 1982 and his MA and PhD in political science from Clark Atlanta University in 1987. Baraka has said the work of W.E.B. Du Bois was important in the formation of his black internationalist worldview, and he attended Clark Atlanta, where Du Bois had taught. Baraka became involved in the Central America solidarity movement, organizing delegations to Nicaragua in support of the Nicaraguan Revolution. He then became an Amnesty International volunteer, eventually moving up to the board of the organization.

== Career ==
From 2004 to 2011, Baraka served as the founding executive director of the US Human Rights Network, a national network that grew to over 300 U.S.-based organizations and 1,500 individual members. Baraka has served on the boards of several human rights organizations, including Amnesty International, the Center for Constitutional Rights, and Africa Action.

As the Southern Regional Director of Amnesty International USA Baraka was instrumental in developing the organization's 1998 campaign to expose human rights violations in the United States. Additionally, Baraka directed Amnesty's National Program to Abolish the Death Penalty and was involved in most of their major death penalty cases.

Baraka has taught political science at the university level and is currently an editor and contributing columnist for the Black Agenda Report and a writer for CounterPunch.

== Activism ==
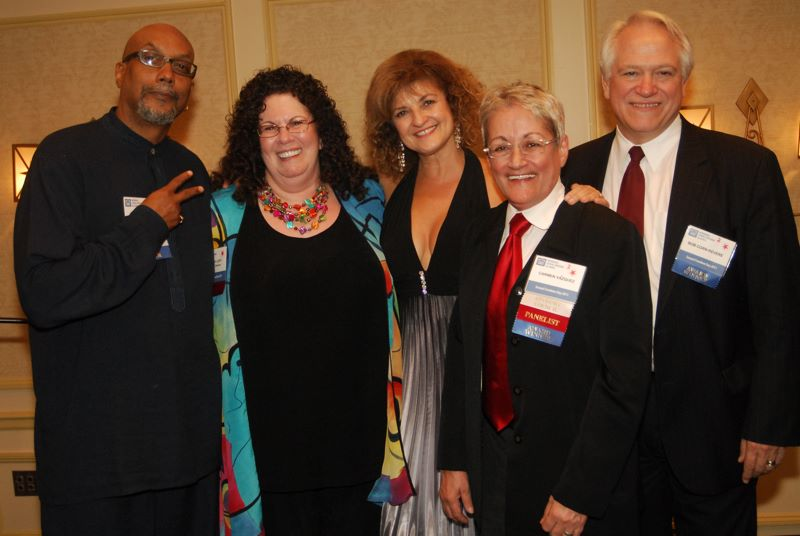
Baraka (left) with other recipients of the Vicki Sexual Freedom Award, 2011

In 2008, Baraka worked with the US Human Rights Network and over 400 organizations to develop a CERD Shadow Report, which concerned US compliance with the terms of the International Convention on the Elimination of All Forms of Racial Discrimination. They felt the US government's reports did not adequately address racial profiling, displacement from Hurricane Katrina, and land rights for the Western Shoshone, among other issues. A large delegation presented their findings.

In September 2016, a Morton County, North Dakota judge issued an arrest warrant against Baraka and Jill Stein, after the two were charged with misdemeanor criminal trespassing and criminal mischief in connection with their protest against the Dakota Access Pipeline. Baraka had spray-painted the word "decolonization" on a bulldozer during the protest. In an interview shortly afterward, Baraka said that he and Stein were "in discussions with our legal team about how we're going to deal with this" and described his action as an act of resistance against "corporate America and the colonial state."

== Views and writings ==
Writings by Baraka have appeared in Black Agenda Report, Common Dreams, Dissident Voice, Pambazuka News, CounterPunch, and other media outlets.

=== Foreign policy ===
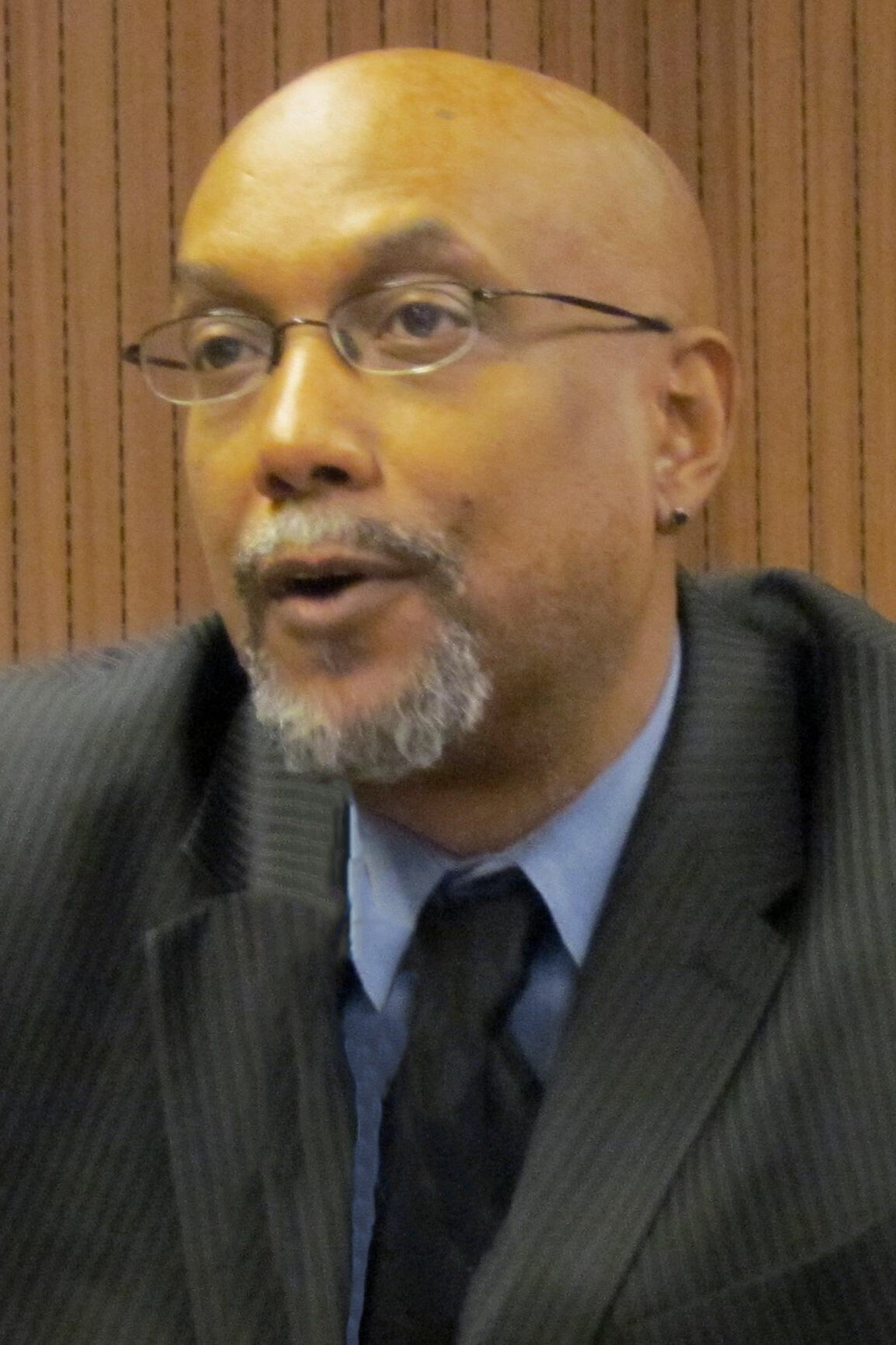
Ajamu Baraka

==== Israel ====
Baraka has been a vehement critic of Israel. In October 2014, Baraka traveled to the Palestinian territories as a member of the African Heritage Delegation organized by the Interfaith Peace-Builders group. After its visit, the delegation issued six "findings and demands" signed by the sixteen members, including Baraka: specifically, they called the expansion of Israeli settlements "ethnic cleansing and 21st century colonialism"; called for an end to U.S. aid to Israel; accused Israel of apartheid; and praised the "Boycott, Divestment and Sanctions" (B.D.S.) movement as "an essential tool in the struggle for Palestinian liberation."

After the visit, Baraka wrote that "a negotiated, relatively 'peaceful' resolution of the conflict is impossible" because "the Israeli state has no interest in a negotiated settlement with Palestinians." He accused Israel of carrying out what he termed a "brutal occupation and illegal theft of Palestinian land," adding:

During my activist life I have traveled to many of the countries that Western colonial/capitalist leaders characterized as despotic totalitarian states – the old Soviet Union, North Korea, Cuba before 1989 – but in none of those states did I witness the systematic mechanism of population control and scientific repression that I witness in "democratic" Israel. The security walls, towers, checkpoints, and armed settlers created an aura of insecurity and impending assault on one's dignity at any time. I left that space wondering how anyone with a modicum of humanity and any sense of morality could reconcile living in that environment from the spoils of Palestinian dispossession and degradation and how any nation could support the Israeli political project.

Baraka also questioned news stories about the June 2014 kidnapping and murder of three Israeli teenagers, which Israel blamed on Hamas members and which led to Israeli air strikes in the Gaza Strip against Hamas. One month after the kidnappings, which he called a "false flag operation," Baraka indicated in an interview his belief that "the kids were supposed to be kidnapped but they weren't supposed to be murdered. That was an accident. But nevertheless it gave Israel the pretext that they were setting up for, and that was the opportunity to basically attack Hamas in order to destroy the unity government."

In March 2015, Baraka condemned Israeli prime minister Benjamin Netanyahu's comments on the day of the 2015 Israeli elections. Netanyahu had warned supporters in a video posted to his Facebook page that his government was in danger because "Arab voters are coming out in droves to the polls." Baraka called Netanyahu's words a "racist rant" that exposed "the brutal and immoral reality of the Israeli colonial project" and the "illusion" of a two-state solution.

==== Syria and Iraq ====
Speaking in 2014 on U.S. involvement in Iraq, Baraka characterized U.S. foreign policy in the Middle East over the previous 20 years as "disastrous" and said that "what has occurred in Iraq was predictable."

In a 2014 interview on Kevin Barrett's Truth Jihad Radio, Baraka stated his belief that the U.S. had a part in creating the "boogeyman" of ISIS "to basically garner significant public support for an argument that says that this monster, these evil forces—that, by the way, we helped to create—we are the only ones that can go in and slay this monster." In the interview, he suggested that control of natural resources, such as the proposed Qatar-Turkey and Iran-Iraq-Syria natural gas pipelines, is one of the underlying reasons for U.S. and Turkish interests in the region:

These are not just geopolitical fights based on principle, but these fights are based on real material realities, real material advantages. So you look at the routes of these various pipelines that are being proposed and actually built to bring natural gas from Central Asia to the European markets. Turkey felt that it was in their interest to make sure that they can influence the best deal possible that will allow them to be positioned to take full advantage of these pipelines. That's one of the reasons many people argue that Syria had to go: that when there were proposals to run these natural gas pipelines from Iran through Iraq and through Syria, that it was a direct threat to some of the ambitions that Erdogan has for Turkey.

Baraka rejected the U.S. position that Syrian president Bashar al-Assad and the 2014 Syrian presidential election are illegitimate. He characterised Syria's opposition as "Salafi-Wahhabi fundamentalists who reject representative democracy and support the imposition of sharia law in Syria". In a 2014 article, he wrote that the idea of Assad's illegitimacy had been "carefully cultivated by Western state propagandists and dutifully disseminated by their auxiliaries in the corporate media."

In 2019 Baraka travelled to Syria to participate in the Third International Trade Union Forum, presided over by President Assad and sponsored by the regime.

==== Ukraine ====
After the 2014 Odesa clashes, which resulted in the deaths of 42 pro-Russian and six pro-Ukrainian protestors, Baraka wrote that he was "outraged by the murder of people defending their rights to self-determination at the hands of U.S.-supported thugs in Odesa."

Two days after the event, Baraka expressed his suspicions that the shootdown of Malaysia Airlines Flight 17 over Ukraine was a "false flag" operation, saying: "Someone wrote about three weeks ago that we should expect a major false flag operation in eastern Ukraine that's going to be then blamed on the Russians. And that's exactly what has happened. They're trying to say in the Western press that the Ukrainian government does not have access to that kind of weaponry, when it's clear that they do." He criticized Western media coverage of the event for "undermining anything coming from Russia Today. That's where you see the story being advanced that there is a possibility that this story is a little more complicated than people realize." Baraka also claimed that observers from the Organization for Security and Co-operation in Europe were "sent in basically as spies who showed up on the scene to quote-unquote 'monitor'."

==== Nigeria ====
Baraka has criticized calls for Western military action against the jihadist rebel group Boko Haram, arguing that "a purely military response will only exacerbate an insurgency whose roots lie in the complex socio-historical conditions and internal contradictions of Northeast Nigeria." In May 2014, a month after Boko Haram kidnapped 276 schoolgirls from the northern Nigerian town of Chibok, he expressed skepticism about the official version of events and the number of victims, saying that "even if there was a kidnapping, there's some people who are suggesting that the numbers are in fact inflated." Baraka also stated that while he was "outraged" by the kidnapping, he was also suspicious of U.S. humanitarian concerns in the region: "U.S. policymakers don't give a damn about the schoolgirls in Nigeria because their real objective is to use the threat of Boko Haram in the northern part of the country to justify the real goal of occupying the oil fields in the south and to block the Chinese in Nigeria."

=== Je suis Charlie movement ===
In a January 2015 essay, Baraka described the Republican march in Paris in reaction to the Charlie Hebdo shooting as a "white power march," and the Je suis Charlie movement in general as an "arrogant rallying cry for white supremacy". Baraka condemned what he perceived as the disproportionate interest in the Charlie Hebdo attacks, and the relative lack of interest in the Baga massacre in Nigeria by Boko Haram, which took place days before the Charlie Hebdo shooting and resulted in many more deaths. Baraka also criticized the "degrading ritual" of assimilation that Arabs and Muslims undergo in France, the "arrogant lack of respect for the ideas and culture of non-European peoples" that led to the French ban on face covering in public spaces, and the "racist" and "Islamophobic" character of Charlie Hebdo's recent publications. Baraka's "Je suis Charlie" article was republished in January 2016 in an anthology about the November 2015 Paris attacks, titled ANOTHER French False Flag? Bloody Tracks from Paris to San Bernardino. This was controversial because the editor, Kevin Barrett, is widely considered a denier of the Holocaust and the 9/11 attacks, although Baraka said he was unaware of this and disassociated himself from Barrett's views.

In an article titled "No 'Je Suis Charleston'?" Baraka contended that a collective response similar to "Je suis Charlie" was absent after the Charleston church shooting at the Emanuel AME Church, and criticized Obama for not calling suspect Dylann Roof a terrorist. As a longtime opponent of the death penalty, Baraka has also criticized the Department of Justice's decision to seek the death penalty for Roof, saying that it "should be seen as no more than another tactical move by the state as part of the last phase of the counterinsurgency launched against the black liberation movement. ... By appealing to African Americans, the group in the country most consistently opposed to the death penalty, state propagandists saw this as a perfect opportunity to undermine opposition to capital punishment and facilitate the process of psychological incorporation."

=== Reception ===
Writing for Politico, Christopher Hooks claimed Baraka "has a long history of fringe statements and beliefs."

== Critique of public individuals ==
Baraka has described Ta-Nehisi Coates, Beyoncé and Bernie Sanders as "media-driven pseudo-opposition".

=== Bill Clinton ===
In June 2016, Baraka criticized the family of Muhammad Ali for inviting Bill Clinton to deliver the boxer's eulogy. Baraka described Clinton as a "rapist" and "petty opportunist politician."

=== Barack Obama ===
Baraka referred to President Barack Obama as an "Uncle Tom president" after Obama condemned the 2014 riots and violence in Ferguson, Missouri that occurred in the wake of the police killing of Michael Brown. Defending his use of the term, Baraka later said that he was speaking to a "specialized audience" and was attempting to "shock people into a more critical look at this individual." Baraka has also argued that Obama has shown "obsequious deference to white power," and that Obama and Loretta Lynch are members of the "black petit-bourgeoisie who have become the living embodiments of the partial success of the state's attempt to colonize the consciousness of Africans/black people."

Baraka was critical of the Obama administration's decision to not attend the 2009 UN World Conference Against Racism in Geneva. In 2013, Baraka stated that inviting Obama to the 50th anniversary of the 1963 March on Washington "should be taken as an insult by everyone who has struggled and continues to struggle for human rights, peace and social justice." More recently, he has argued that "the Obama Administration collaborated with suppressing the 2009 report from the Department of Homeland Security (DHS), which identified violent white supremacist groups as a threat to national security more lethal than the threat from Islamic 'fundamentalists'."

In an October 2016 interview with The Detroit News, Baraka described Obama as a "moral disaster" and one of "the worst things that has happened to African-American people".

=== Cornel West ===
In September 2015, Baraka initially criticized Cornel West for supporting Bernie Sanders, saying that West was "sheep-dogging for the Democrats" by "drawing voters into the corrupt Democratic party". West later endorsed the Stein/Baraka ticket after Sanders endorsed Hillary Clinton.

== 2016 U.S. vice presidential campaign ==
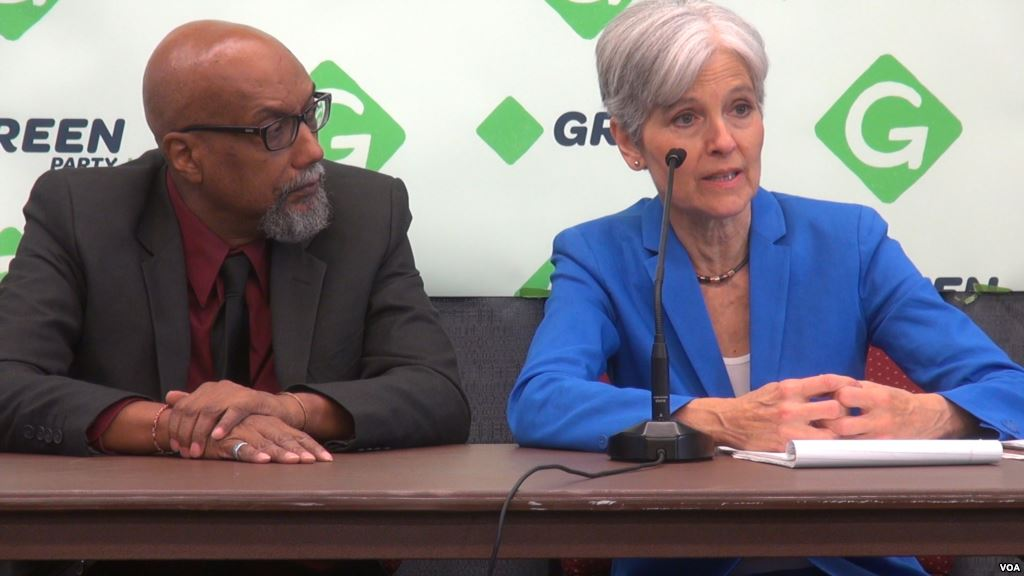
Baraka and Stein, August 2016

On August 1, 2016, Green Party presumptive presidential nominee Jill Stein announced that Baraka would be her running mate. Stein and Baraka were formally nominated by delegates at the 2016 Green National Convention on August 6, 2016. In his acceptance speech, Baraka said that he joined the Green Party effort to "build a multinational movement here in this country based on the needs and the aspirations of working people".

The Stein/Baraka ticket received over 1% of the national popular vote from 1,457,218 voters in the 2016 election.

== Awards and recognition ==
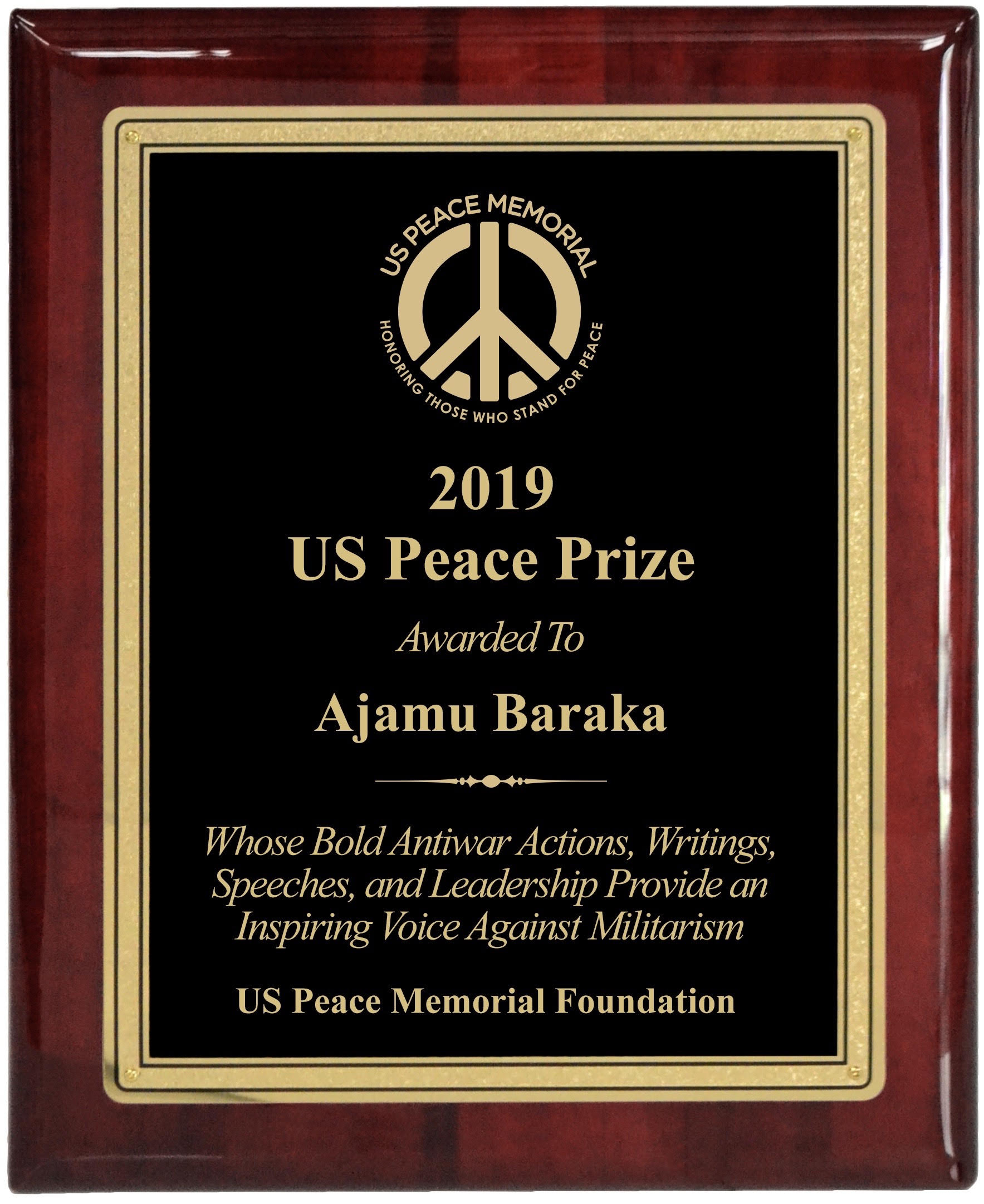
The US Peace Prize plaque awarded to Baraka in 2019

In 1998, Baraka was one of 300 human rights workers honored by UN Secretary General Kofi Annan. In 2001, Baraka was named "abolitionist of the year" by the National Coalition to Abolish the Death Penalty for his efforts to end the death penalty in the United States.

In 2019, the US Peace Memorial Foundation awarded Baraka with The US Peace Prize for his "bold antiwar actions, writings, speeches, and leadership that provide an inspiring voice against militarism." In the same year, Baraka was also awarded with the Serena Shim Award for "Uncompromised Integrity in Journalism".

== Publications ==
- Ajamu Baraka (2013). "Praxis from the Centre Back to the Margins: Amílcar Cabral's Method as a Guide for Reconstructing the Radical Black Political Subject". In Firoze Manji; Bill Fletcher Jr. (eds.). Claim No Easy Victories: The Legacy of Amílcar Cabral. Codesria. ISBN 9782869785557. Archived from the original on January 27, 2021.
- Ajamu Baraka (2014). "Socialism Is the Highest Expression of Human Rights". In Frances Goldin; Debby Smith; Michael Smith (eds.). Imagine: Living in a Socialist U.S.A. HarperCollins. ISBN 9780062305589.
- Ajamu Baraka (2014). "For a national alliance for racial justice and human rights". In Kevin Alexander Gray; Jeffrey St. Clair; JoAnn Wypijewski (eds.). Killing Trayvons : an anthology of American violence. CounterPunch Books. ISBN 9780692213995.
- Ajamu Baraka (January 6, 2016). "The Paris Attacks and the White Lives Matter Movement". In Kevin Barrett (ed.). ANOTHER French False Flag?: Bloody Tracks from Paris to San Bernardino. Sifting and Winnowing Books. ISBN 9780996143011.

== Notes ==
Party political offices
Preceded by Cheri Honkala	Green nominee for Vice President of the United States; 2016	Succeeded by Angela Nicole Walker; Affiliated, Presumptive
