= Bala Şahağac =

- Municipality
- Location within Azerbaijan
- Country: Azerbaijan
- Rayon: Astara
- Municipality: Siyaku
- Time zone: UTC+4 (AZT)
  - Summer (DST): UTC+5 (AZT)

Bala Şahağac (also, Balaca Şahağac) is a village and municipality in the Astara Rayon of Azerbaijan. It has a population of 1,379. The municipality consists of the villages of Bala Şahağac and Qamışovka.
