= Anbuba =

Anbabu
- Village
- Location within Azerbaijan
- Coordinates: 38°36′19″N 48°40′30″E
- Country: Azerbaijan
- Rayon: Astara
- Municipality: Motolayataq
- Time zone: UTC+4 (AZT)

Anbabu (also, Ambabu and Anbabo) is a village in the Astara Rayon of Azerbaijan. The village forms part of the municipality of Motolayataq.
