= Kokolos =

- Municipality
- Location within Azerbaijan
- Coordinates: 38°37′08″N 48°50′50″E
- Country: Azerbaijan
- Rayon: Astara

Population
  - Total: 3,505
- Time zone: UTC+4 (AZT)
  - Summer (DST): UTC+5 (AZT)

Kokolos (also, Kakalos) is a village and municipality in the Astara Rayon of Azerbaijan. It has a population of 3,505.
