= Hamoşam =

- Municipality
- Location within Azerbaijan
- Coordinates: 38°33′41″N 48°35′49″E
- Country: Azerbaijan
- Rayon: Astara

Population
  - Total: 1,750
- Time zone: UTC+4 (AZT)

Hamoşam (also, Hamuşam, Həmoşam, Hamosam, Khamosham, and Khimosham) is a village and municipality in the Astara Rayon of Azerbaijan. It has a population of 1,750. The municipality consists of the villages of Hamoşam, Klinbi, Rivadila, and Rıqloba.

== Notable natives ==
- Mirza Jabiyev — Hero of the Soviet Union.
