= Tüləküvan =

- Municipality
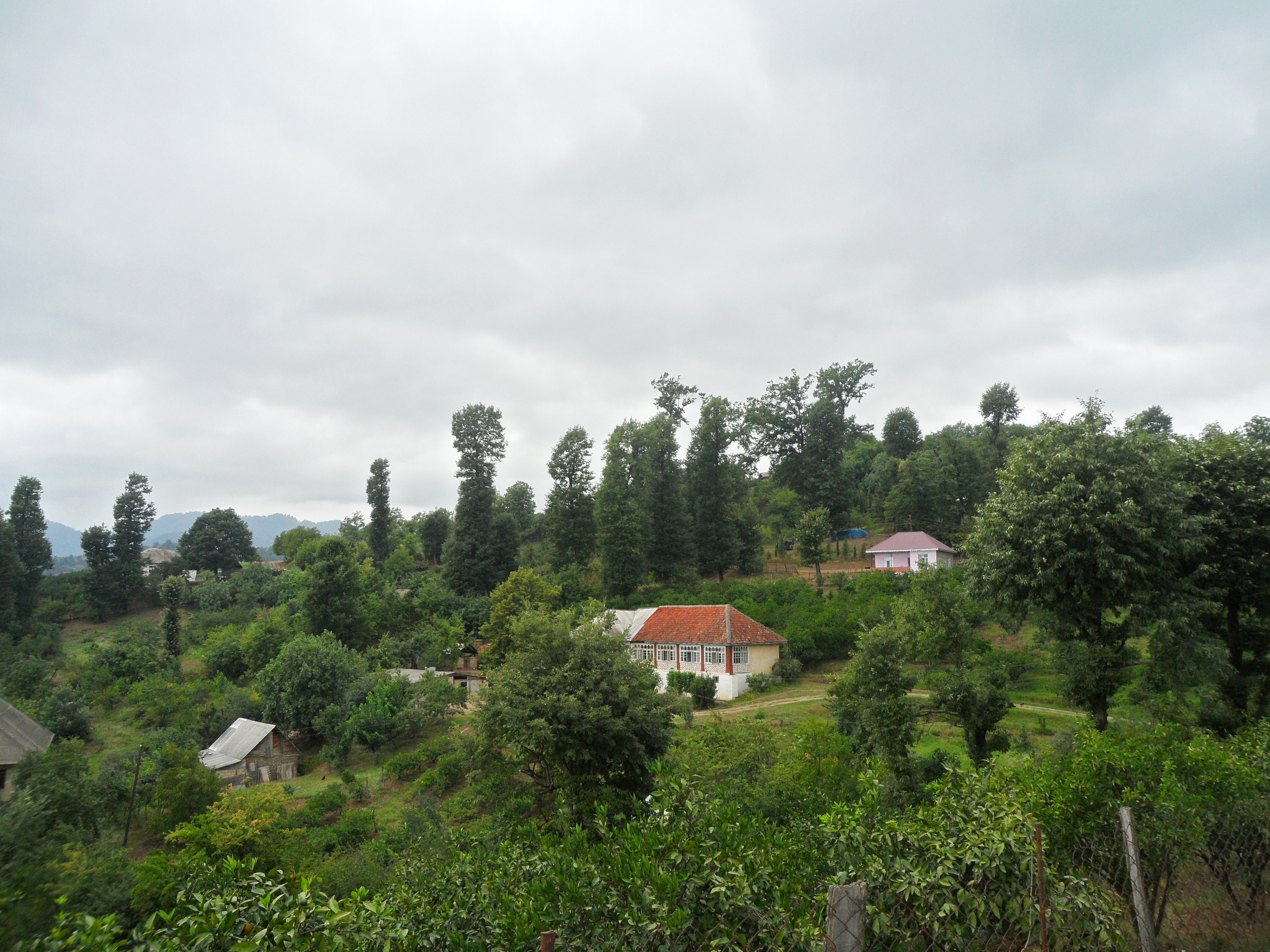

- Location within Azerbaijan
- Coordinates: 38°34′N 48°47′E
- Country: Azerbaijan
- Rayon: Astara

Population
  - Total: 1,296
- Time zone: UTC+4 (AZT)

Tüləküvan (also, Tüləgüvan, Tuaguan, and Tulaguvan) is a village and municipality in the Astara Rayon of Azerbaijan. It has a population of 1,296.
