= Vələparqo =

- Village
- Location within Azerbaijan
- Coordinates: 38°36′N 48°40′E
- Country: Azerbaijan
- Rayon: Astara
- Municipality: Motolayataq
- Time zone: UTC+4 (AZT)

Vələparqo is a village in the municipality of Motolayataq in the Astara Rayon of Azerbaijan.
