= Sıqalonu =

- Municipality
- Location within Azerbaijan
- Coordinates: 38°36′15″N 48°47′40″E
- Country: Azerbaijan
- Rayon: Astara

Population
  - Total: 403
- Time zone: UTC+4 (AZT)
  - Summer (DST): UTC+5 (AZT)

Sıqalonu (also, Sığaloni) is a village and municipality in the Astara Rayon of Azerbaijan. It has a population of 403.
