= Toradi =

- Municipality
- Location within Azerbaijan
- Coordinates: 38°34′03″N 48°33′58″E
- Country: Azerbaijan
- Rayon: Astara

Population
  - Total: 820
- Time zone: UTC+4 (AZT)

Toradi (also, Torady) is a village and municipality in the Astara Rayon of Azerbaijan. It has a population of 820.
