= Cukas =

Cukas may refer to:

- Çükəş, a village in Azerbaijan
- CUKAS, a music course clearing house by Conservatoires UK
