= Rıqloba =

- Village
- Location within Azerbaijan
- Coordinates: 38°33′N 48°36′E
- Country: Azerbaijan
- Rayon: Astara
- Municipality: Hamoşam
- Time zone: UTC+4 (AZT)
  - Summer (DST): UTC+5 (AZT)

Rıqloba (also, Rıqlaba, Ryglyba and Yagul’ba) is a village in the Astara Rayon of Azerbaijan. The village forms part of the municipality of Hamoşam.
