= Qaladəhnə =

- Village
- Location within Azerbaijan
- Coordinates: 38°31′09″N 48°52′17″E
- Country: Azerbaijan
- Rayon: Astara
- Time zone: UTC+4 (AZT)
  - Summer (DST): UTC+5 (AZT)

Qaladəhnə (also, Kaladagna, Kaladagnya, and Kaladakhna) is a village in the Astara Rayon of Azerbaijan.
