= Siyətük =

- Municipality
- Location within Azerbaijan
- Coordinates: 38°28′36″N 48°47′07″E
- Country: Azerbaijan
- Rayon: Astara

Population
  - Total: 982
- Time zone: UTC+4 (AZT)

Siyətük (also, Seatuk) is a village and municipality in the Astara Rayon of Azerbaijan. It has a population of 982. The municipality consists of the villages of Siyətük, Vəznəş, and Sekəşam.
