= Gülyatan =

Kələdəhnə
- Village
- Location within Azerbaijan
- Coordinates: 38°36′12″N 48°51′59″E
- Country: Azerbaijan
- Rayon: Astara
- Time zone: UTC+4 (AZT)

Qaladəhnə (also, Qaladəhnə and Kaladəhnə) is a village in the Astara Rayon of Azerbaijan.
