= Giləşə =

- Village
- Location within Azerbaijan
- Coordinates: 38°36′N 48°47′E
- Country: Azerbaijan
- Rayon: Astara
- Municipality: Siyaku
- Time zone: UTC+4 (AZT)

Giləşə is a village in the municipality of Siyaku in the Astara Rayon of Azerbaijan.
