= Züngüləş =

- Municipality
- Location within Azerbaijan
- Coordinates: 38°27′16″N 48°47′10″E
- Country: Azerbaijan
- Rayon: Astara

Population
  - Total: 554
- Time zone: UTC+4 (AZT)

Züngüləş (also, Zünqüləş, Zangyulyash, and Zungulyash) is a village and municipality in the Astara Rayon of Azerbaijan. It has a population of 554.
