= Unuz =

- Village
- Location within Azerbaijan
- Coordinates: 38°25′11″N 48°39′12″E
- Country: Azerbaijan
- Rayon: Astara
- Time zone: UTC+4 (AZT)

Unuz is a village in the Astara Rayon of Azerbaijan.
