= Məscidməhəllə =

- Municipality
- Location within Azerbaijan
- Coordinates: 38°27′30″N 48°51′02″E
- Country: Azerbaijan
- Rayon: Astara

Population
  - Total: 1,046
- Time zone: UTC+4 (AZT)
  - Summer (DST): UTC+5 (AZT)

Məscidməhəllə (also, Meçidməhlə, Məsçitməhəllə, Mechet’ Megla, Mechet’maglya, and Mechet’makhla) is a village and municipality in the Astara Rayon of Azerbaijan. It has a population of 1,046.
