= Şəvqo =

Human settlement in Azerbaijan

Coordinates: 38°31′N 48°37′E

Şəvqo is a village and municipality in the Astara Rayon of Azerbaijan. It has a population of 465. The municipality consists of the villages of Şəvqo, Avyarud, and Diqo.
