= Siraf refineries complex =

Oil refinery in Bushehr, Iran

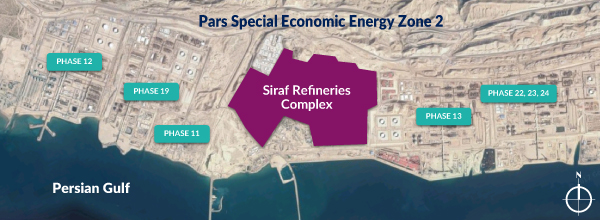

The Siraf refineries complex is an Iranian oil refinery. It is located at the Siraf region of Bushehr province, between 13th and 19th phases of the South Pars gas field over an area of approximately 300 hectares.

== History ==
In 2014, Petroleum Ministry of the Islamic Republic of Iran planned to develop a complex known as “Siraf Refining Park” to be located on the Persian Gulf in the Tombak Region (50 km West of Assaluyeh). The hydrocarbon condensate feed was to be mainly supplied from existing sources.

== Design ==
Siraf refineries complex consists of eight independent gas condensate refineries with common facilities and infrastructure units with the total capacity of 480,000 barrels (76,000 m^{3}) per stream day.

This location has access to the Iranian Natural Gas Trunk-line (IGAT) and gas condensate as feed for the refineries. Moreover, infrastructures such as jetty, sea water intake, power grid, etc. reduce the total investment cost of this complex by almost 1 billion US$.
