= Motolayataq =

- Municipality
- Location within Azerbaijan
- Coordinates: 38°36′N 48°39′E
- Country: Azerbaijan
- Rayon: Astara

Population
  - Total: 1,108
- Time zone: UTC+4 (AZT)
  - Summer (DST): UTC+5 (AZT)

Motolayataq (also, Motalayataq, Motalayatag, and Motolayyatag) is a village and municipality in the Astara Rayon of Azerbaijan. It has a population of 1,108. The municipality consists of the villages of Motalayataq, Anbabu, Vələparqo, Əkbərməhlə, and Şıxımpeştə.
