= Burzubənd =

- Municipality
- Location within Azerbaijan
- Coordinates: 38°32′07″N 48°45′52″E
- Country: Azerbaijan
- Rayon: Astara

Population
  - Total: 978
- Time zone: UTC+4 (AZT)
  - Summer (DST): UTC+5 (AZT)

Burzubənd (also, Birziband and Burzubend) is a village and municipality in the Astara Rayon of Azerbaijan. It has a population of 978. The municipality consists of the villages of Burzubənd, Vənəşikəş, and Noyabud.
