= Kijoba =

- Municipality
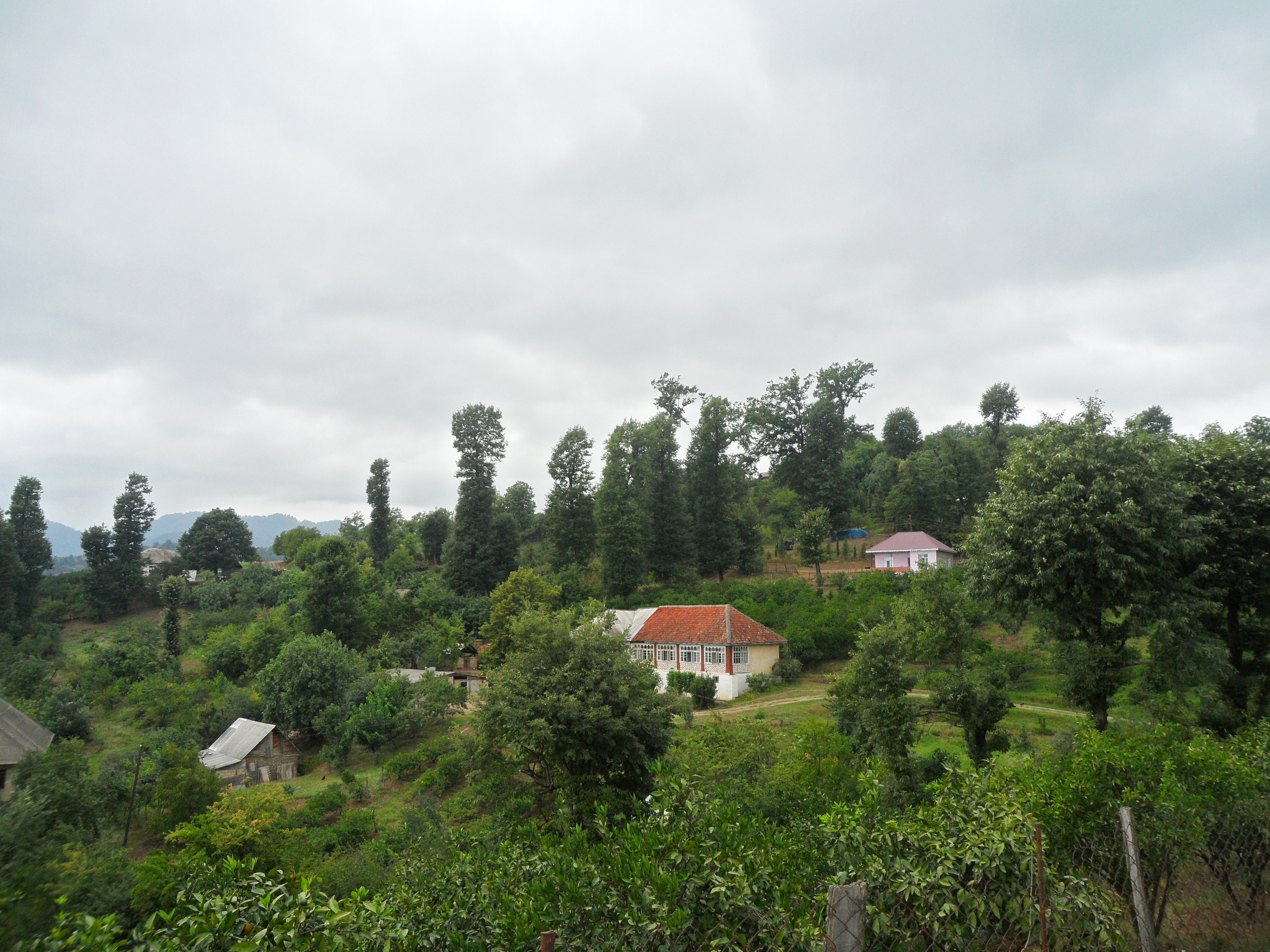

- Location within Azerbaijan
- Coordinates: 38°31′58″N 48°49′00″E
- Country: Azerbaijan
- Rayon: Astara

Population
  - Total: 4,412
- Time zone: UTC+4 (AZT)
  - Summer (DST): UTC+5 (AZT)

Kijoba (Talysh: Kijəbə) is a village and municipality in the Astara Rayon of Azerbaijan. It has a population of 4,412. Kijoba's tea plantations are a local focus of ecotourism.
