= Noyabud =

- Village
- Location within Azerbaijan
- Coordinates: 38°31′N 48°46′E
- Country: Azerbaijan
- Rayon: Astara
- Municipality: Burzubənd
- Time zone: UTC+4 (AZT)
  - Summer (DST): UTC+5 (AZT)

Noyabud (also, Noyabut) is a village in the Astara Rayon of Azerbaijan. The village forms part of the municipality of Burzubənd.
