= Vəznəş =

- Village
- Location within Azerbaijan
- Coordinates: 38°29′N 48°47′E
- Country: Azerbaijan
- Rayon: Astara
- Municipality: Siyətük
- Time zone: UTC+4 (AZT)

Vəznəş is a village in the municipality of Siyətük in the Astara Rayon of Azerbaijan.
