= Binabəy =

- Village
- Location within Azerbaijan
- Coordinates: 38°35′N 48°49′E
- Country: Azerbaijan
- Rayon: Astara
- Municipality: Siyaku
- Time zone: UTC+4 (AZT)
  - Summer (DST): UTC+5 (AZT)

Binabəy (also, Benabay) is a village in the Astara Rayon of Azerbaijan. The village forms part of the municipality of Siyaku.
