= Xıçaso =

- Village
- Location within Azerbaijan
- Coordinates: 38°33′N 48°44′E
- Country: Azerbaijan
- Rayon: Astara
- Municipality: Şəmətük
- Time zone: UTC+4 (AZT)

Xıçaso (also, Xiçaso, Khachasu, and Khychaso) is a village in the Astara Rayon of Azerbaijan. The village forms part of the municipality of Şəmətük.
