= Astara TV Tower =

Astara Television Tower
- Astara televiziya qüllə
- Location within Azerbaijan

General information
- Status: Completed
- Type: Steel lattice television tower
- Location: Astara, Astara Rayon, Azerbaijan
- Coordinates: 38°29′3.24″N 48°50′11.39″E
- Construction started: 1981
- Completed: 1981

Height
- Architectural: 244 m (801 ft) (approximate estimate)
- Antenna spire: 243.84 m (800 ft)

Astara Television Tower (Azerbaijani: Astara televiziya qüllə), is a steel 243.9 m (800 ft) tall Azerbaijani lattice television tower located in the city of Astara, in the southeastern part of the Republic of Azerbaijan. The tower is used for transmitting FM Radio and TV-broadcasting as well as a mobile repeater.

The tower is 200 m (656 ft), excluding the antenna and a total height of 243.84 m (800 ft) with the antenna.

== Design ==
The tower is a lattice tower with a horizontal cross and a guyed antenna at the tower's pinnacle.

== Transmission ==
The Astara TV Tower transmits FM-/TV-broadcasting throughout the city of Astara. For more information, see the table below.

| Frequency (MHz) | Polarization | Program | Year | Language | HMax (Maximum Effective Relative Height) | PMax (Maximum Effective Power) |
|---|---|---|---|---|---|---|
| 90 | Vertical | AzTV | 1926-present | Azerbaijani | 56 | .31 |
| 99.75 | Horizontal | ORT | 1938-present | | | 3.9 |
| 104.3 | Mixed | Araz FM | | | | |

== See also ==
- Lattice tower
- Astara
- AzTV
- TRT
- ORT
