= Qamışoba =

- Village
- Location within Azerbaijan
- Coordinates: 38°37′54″N 48°52′08″E
- Country: Azerbaijan
- Rayon: Astara
- Municipality: Bala Şahağac
- Time zone: UTC+4 (AZT)

Qamışoba, Qamışovka (?-2018) (also, Qamişovka, Kamyshevka, and Kamyshovka) is a village in the Astara Rayon of Azerbaijan. The village forms part of the municipality of Bala Şahağac.
