= Vovlada =

- Village
- Location within Azerbaijan
- Coordinates: 38°30′52″N 48°40′12″E
- Country: Azerbaijan
- Rayon: Astara
- Municipality: Lomin
- Time zone: UTC+4 (AZT)

Vovlada (also, Vavada, Vavlada, and Vovada) is a village in the Astara Rayon of Azerbaijan. The village forms part of the municipality of Lomin. Vovlada in Astara (region) is a town located in Azerbaijan, about 145 miles (or 233 kilometers) South-West of Baku, the country's capital town.
