= Dürriyə =

- Municipality
- Location within Azerbaijan
- Coordinates: 38°32′N 48°40′E
- Country: Azerbaijan
- Rayon: Astara

Population
  - Total: 697
- Time zone: UTC+4 (AZT)

Dürriyə (also, Deruya and Duriya) is a village and municipality in the Astara Rayon of Azerbaijan. It has a population of 697.
