= Bagchilyar =

- Village
- Location within Azerbaijan
- Coordinates: 38°25′N 48°38′E
- Country: Azerbaijan
- Rayon: Astara
- Time zone: UTC+4 (AZT)
  - Summer (DST): UTC+5 (AZT)

Bagchilyar is a village in the Astara Rayon of Azerbaijan.
