= Şıxarxı =

- Village
- Location within Azerbaijan
- Coordinates: 38°33′22″N 48°51′55″E
- Country: Azerbaijan
- Rayon: Astara
- Time zone: UTC+4 (AZT)

Şıxarxı (also, Shikharkhi and Shykharkhi) is a village in the Astara Rayon of Azerbaijan.
