= Ojakəran =

- Municipality
- Location within Azerbaijan
- Coordinates: 38°32′N 48°46′E
- Country: Azerbaijan
- Rayon: Astara

Ojakəran (also, Odzhakachan and Ozhakeran) is a village and municipality in the Astara Rayon of Azerbaijan. It has a population of 1,750.
