= Vənəşikəş =

- Village
- Location within Azerbaijan
- Coordinates: 38°32′N 48°44′E
- Country: Azerbaijan
- Rayon: Astara
- Municipality: Burzubənd
- Time zone: UTC+4 (AZT)

Vənəşikəş is a village in the municipality of Burzubənd in the Astara Rayon of Azerbaijan.
