= Avyarud =

- Village
- Location within Azerbaijan
- Coordinates: 38°30′24″N 48°37′05″E
- Country: Azerbaijan
- Rayon: Astara
- Municipality: Şəvqo
- Time zone: UTC+4 (AZT)

Avyarud (also, Ayarud) is a village in the Astara Rayon of Azerbaijan. The village forms part of the municipality of Şəvqo.
