= Şıxımpeştə =

- Village
- Location within Azerbaijan
- Coordinates: 38°36′N 48°39′E
- Country: Azerbaijan
- Rayon: Astara
- Municipality: Motolayataq
- Time zone: UTC+4 (AZT)

Şıxımpeştə (also, Shekhin-Peshta and Shykhympeshta) is a village in the Astara Rayon of Azerbaijan. The village forms part of the municipality of Motolayataq.
