= Siyakeş =

- Village
- Location within Azerbaijan
- Coordinates: 38°35′N 48°47′E
- Country: Azerbaijan
- Rayon: Astara
- Municipality: Şağlazüzə
- Time zone: UTC+4 (AZT)

Siyakeş is a village in the municipality of Şağlazüzə in the Astara Rayon of Azerbaijan.
