= Şağlazüzə =

Coordinates: 38°35′N 48°47′E

Şağlazüzə (also, Şaqlazüzə) is a village and municipality in the Astara Rayon of Azerbaijan. It has a population of 1,299. The municipality consists of the villages of Şağlazüzə, Siyakeş, Şıxməhlə and Həsin.
