= Gilakeran =

- Village
- Location within Azerbaijan
- Coordinates: 38°28′53″N 48°52′12″E
- Country: Azerbaijan
- Rayon: Astara
- Time zone: UTC+4 (AZT)

Gilakeran (also, Gelakeran, Geliakeran, and Gilekeran) is a village in the Astara Rayon of Azerbaijan.
