= Əkbərməhlə =

- Village
- Location within Azerbaijan
- Coordinates: 38°35′N 48°39′E
- Country: Azerbaijan
- Rayon: Astara
- Municipality: Motolayataq
- Time zone: UTC+4 (AZT)

Əkbərməhlə is a village in the municipality of Motolayataq in the Astara Rayon of Azerbaijan.
