= Dylmady =

- Village
- Location within Azerbaijan
- Coordinates: 38°27′N 48°40′E
- Country: Azerbaijan
- Rayon: Astara
- Time zone: UTC+4 (AZT)

Dylmady (also, Dyl’mady and Dil’mady) is a village in the Astara Rayon of Azerbaijan.
