= Artupa =

- Municipality
- Location within Azerbaijan
- Coordinates: 38°28′23″N 48°50′20″E
- Country: Azerbaijan
- Rayon: Astara

Population
  - Total: 1,882
- Time zone: UTC+4 (AZT)

Artupa (also, Ardupa) is a village and municipality in the Astara Rayon of Azerbaijan. It has a population of 1,882.
