= Vaqo =

- Municipality
- Location within Azerbaijan
- Coordinates: 38°36′17″N 48°47′19″E
- Country: Azerbaijan
- Rayon: Astara

Population
  - Total: 1,598
- Time zone: UTC+4 (AZT)

Vaqo (also, Vago) is a village and municipality in the Astara Rayon of Azerbaijan. It has a population of 1,598. The municipality consists of the villages of Vaqo, Lələkəpeştə, and Liəzi.
