= Miki, Azerbaijan =

Miki
- Municipality
- Location within Azerbaijan
- Coordinates: 38°35′23″N 48°44′23″E
- Country: Azerbaijan
- Rayon: Astara

Population
  - Total: 935
- Time zone: UTC+4 (AZT)
  - Summer (DST): UTC+5 (AZT)

Miki (also, Mikk) is a village and municipality in the Astara Rayon of Azerbaijan. It has a population of 935. The municipality consists of the villages of Miki, Qanqalaş, Vaqadi, Giləparqo, and Lobir.
