= Şəmətük =

- Municipality
- Location within Azerbaijan
- Coordinates: 38°34′N 48°45′E
- Country: Azerbaijan
- Rayon: Astara

Population
  - Total: 462
- Time zone: UTC+4 (AZT)
  - Summer (DST): UTC+5 (AZT)

Şəmətük (also, Shamatuk and Shematuk) is a village and municipality in the Astara Rayon of Azerbaijan. It has a population of 462. The municipality consists of the villages of Şəmətük, Sipiyaəlfətik, and Xıçaso.
