= Vagif Akhundov =

Azerbaijani military figure (born 1950)

Vagif Akhundov Vaqif Axundov
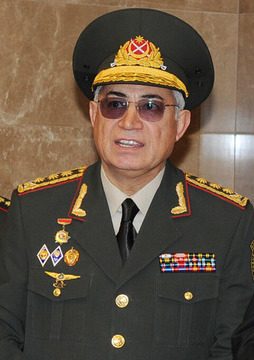

Chief of the Special State Protection Service of Azerbaijan
- In office June 2, 2003 – March 16, 2020

Chief of the Main Security Department of the Supreme State Authorities and Management Bodies of the Republic of Azerbaijan
- In office August 23, 1993 – May 6, 2002

Chief of the Department of Protection of the Supreme State Authorities and Management Bodies of the Republic of Azerbaijan
- In office February 25, 1992 – August 23, 1993

Personal details
- Born: September 16, 1950 (age 76) Astara, Astara District, Azerbaijan SSR, USSR
- Civilian awards

Military service
- Rank: colonel general
- Military awards

Vagif Alibala oghlu Akhundov (Azerbaijani: Vaqif Əlibala oğlu Axundov, born September 16, 1950) is an Azerbaijani military figure, colonel-general, was the chief of the Special State Protection Service of the Republic of Azerbaijan.

== Biography ==
Vagif Akhundov was born on September 16, 1950, in the city of Astara. In 1968-1972 he studied at the Azerbaijan Institute of Petroleum and Chemistry, in 1989–1994 at Baku State University, and in 1999–2002 at the Academy of Public Administration under the President of the Republic of Azerbaijan. He is an economist-engineer and a lawyer by profession.

He began his career in 1971 as a lathe operator at a drilling and ax plant in Kuybishev. From 1972 to 1975 he served in the Soviet Army as an officer. After returning from military service, he worked as a normalizer, senior engineer, economist at the Lieutenant Schmidt Machine-Building Plant in Baku.

In 1975 he worked as an assistant on duty at the Ministry of Internal Affairs of Azerbaijan, in 1975-1978 as a secretary of the Komsomol committee in the Baku Department of Internal Affairs, in 1978-1991 as a deputy head of the department, head of the department at the Ministry of Internal Affairs.

In 1992–1993, he served as Chief of the Department of Protection of the Supreme State Authorities and Management Bodies of the Republic of Azerbaijan, and since 1993, he has served as Chief of the Main Security Department of the Supreme State Authorities and Management Bodies of the Republic of Azerbaijan.

From June 2, 2003 to March 16, 2020, he was the Chief of the Special State Protection Service of Azerbaijan.

== Awards ==
- Azerbaijani Flag Order
- Shohrat Order — September 16, 2020
- For service to the Fatherland Order (1st degree) — August 20, 2018
- For service to the Fatherland Order (2nd degree) — September 15, 2010

== Sources ==
- "Axundov Vaqif Əlibala oğlu". Azərbaycan Milli Ensiklopediyası. Vol. I (A – Argelander). Bakı: AMEA "Azərbaycan Milli Ensiklopediyası" Elmi Mərkəzi. 2009. p. 222. ISBN 978-9952-441-02-4.
