= Ovala =

- Municipality
- Location within Azerbaijan
- Coordinates: 38°33′28″N 48°42′58″E
- Country: Azerbaijan
- Rayon: Astara

Population
  - Total: 258
- Time zone: UTC+4 (AZT)
  - Summer (DST): UTC+5 (AZT)

Ovala is a village and the least populous municipality in the Astara Rayon of Azerbaijan. It has a population of 258.
