= Qanqalaş =

- Village
- Location within Azerbaijan
- Coordinates: 38°35′N 48°45′E
- Country: Azerbaijan
- Rayon: Astara
- Municipality: Miki
- Time zone: UTC+4 (AZT)
  - Summer (DST): UTC+5 (AZT)

Qanqalaş is a village in the municipality of Miki in the Astara Rayon of Azerbaijan.
