= Səkəşam =

- Village
- Location within Azerbaijan
- Coordinates: 38°29′N 48°45′E
- Country: Azerbaijan
- Rayon: Astara
- Municipality: Siyətük
- Time zone: UTC+4 (AZT)
  - Summer (DST): UTC+5 (AZT)

Səkəşam (also, Sekəşam, Sekashan, and Sekesham) is a village that forms part of the municipality of Siyətük, in the Astara Rayon of Azerbaijan.
