= Şahağac =

- Municipality
- Location within Azerbaijan
- Coordinates: 38°35′21″N 48°51′59″E
- Country: Azerbaijan
- Rayon: Astara

Population
  - Total: 4,300
- Time zone: UTC+4 (AZT)
  - Summer (DST): UTC+5 (AZT)

Şahağac (also, Shakhagach and Sahagaci) is a village and municipality in the Astara Rayon of Azerbaijan. It has a population of 1000.
