= Çükəş =

Çükəş Çükəş
- Village
- Location within Azerbaijan
- Coordinates: 38°32′N 48°42′E
- Country: Azerbaijan
- Rayon: Astara
- Municipality: Sipiyəpart
- Time zone: UTC+4 (AZT)
  - Summer (DST): UTC+5 (AZT)

Çükəş is a village in the municipality of Sipiyəpart in the Astara Rayon of Azerbaijan.‍
