= Lomin =

- Municipality
- Location within Azerbaijan
- Country: Azerbaijan
- Rayon: Astara

Population
  - Total: 549
- Time zone: UTC+4 (AZT)
  - Summer (DST): UTC+5 (AZT)

Lomin is a village and municipality in the Astara Rayon of Azerbaijan. It has a population of 549. The municipality consists of the villages of Lomin and Vovlada.
