= Seləkəran =

- Municipality
- Location within Azerbaijan
- Coordinates: 38°28′20″N 48°52′00″E
- Country: Azerbaijan
- Rayon: Astara

Population
  - Total: 886
- Time zone: UTC+4 (AZT)
  - Summer (DST): UTC+5 (AZT)

Seləkəran (also, Selakeran and Selyakeran) is a village and municipality in the Astara Rayon of Azerbaijan. It has a population of 886.
