= Maşxan =

- Municipality
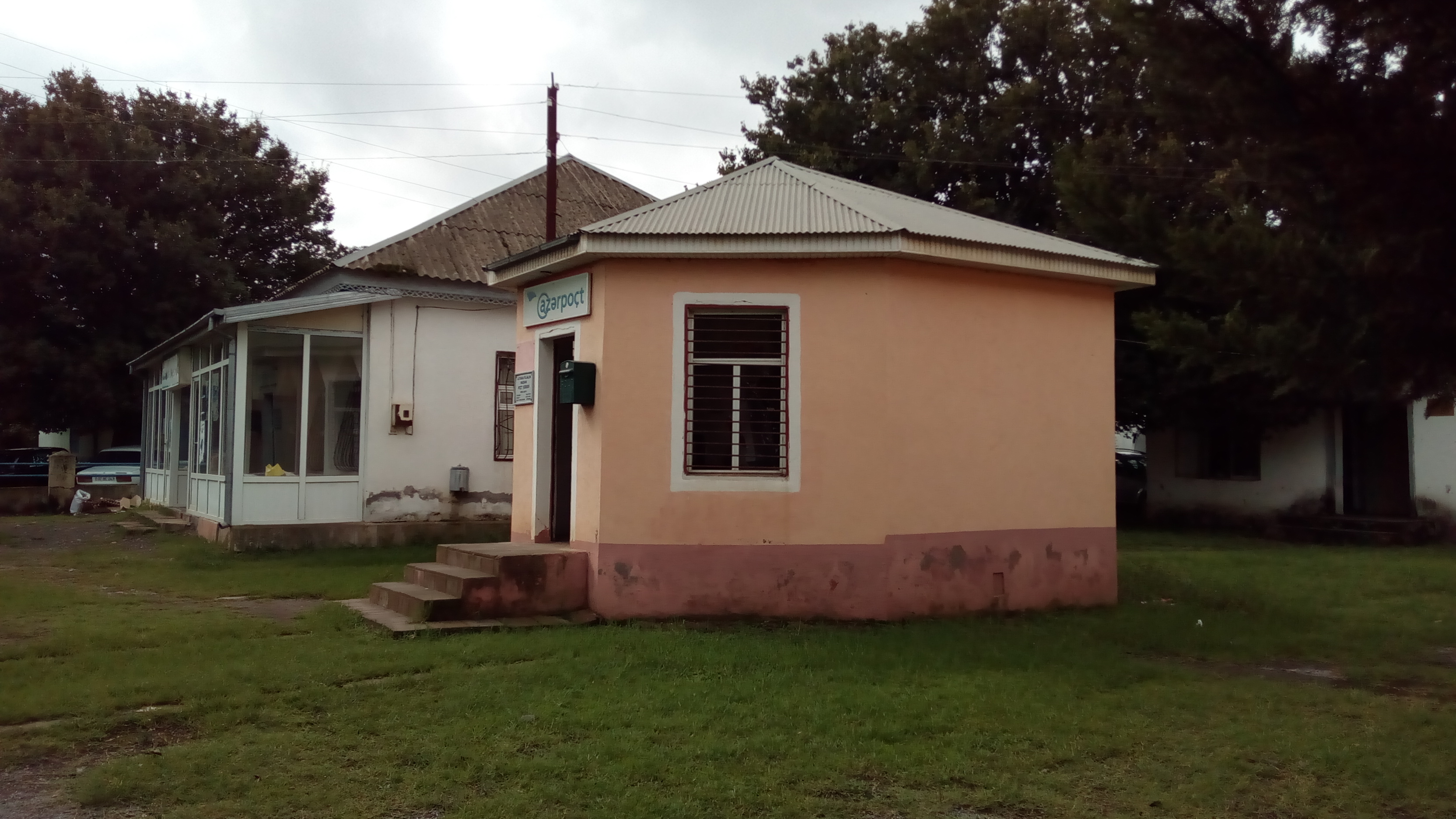
- Post office in Maşxan

- Location within Azerbaijan
- Coordinates: 38°32′59″N 48°49′37″E
- Country: Azerbaijan
- Rayon: Astara

Population
  - Total: 2,518
- Time zone: UTC+4 (AZT)
  - Summer (DST): UTC+5 (AZT)

Maşxan (also, Mashkhan) is a village and municipality in the Astara Rayon of Azerbaijan. It has a population of 2,518.
