= Siyaku =

- Municipality
- Location within Azerbaijan
- Coordinates: 38°35′41″N 48°47′16″E
- Country: Azerbaijan
- Rayon: Astara

Population
  - Total: 1,281
- Time zone: UTC+4 (AZT)

Siyaku (also, Siyakh and Siaku) is a village and municipality in the Astara Rayon of Azerbaijan. It has a population of 1,281. The municipality consists of the villages of Siyaku, Giləşə, and Binabəy.
