= Hajiqabul–Astara–Abadan pipeline =

Location
- Country: Azerbaijan, Iran
- Direction: north-south
- Start: Hajiqabul, Azerbaijan
- Passes through: Astara (Azerbaijan), Astara (Iran), Rasht, Tehran
- To: Abadan (Bid-Boland), Iran

General information
- Type: natural gas
- Partners: SOCAR, National Iranian Gas Company
- Commissioned: 1970

Technical information
- Length: 1,474.5 km (916.2 mi)
- Maximum discharge: 10 billion cubic meters per year

The Hajiqabul–Astara–Abadan pipeline is a natural gas pipeline from Kazi Magomed in Azerbaijan to Iran.

== History ==
The pipeline was agreed between Iran and the Soviet Union in 1965. It was inaugurated in October 1970 in Astara by Mohammad Rezā Shāh Pahlavi and Nikolai Podgorny, Chairman of the Presidium of the Supreme Soviet. In 1971–1979, Southern Caucasus republics of the Soviet Union were supplied through this pipeline by natural gas from Iran. Soviets, in return, agreed to transfer the technology of heavy machinery manufacturing, which led to the foundation of Machine Sazi Arak and to construct Esfahan Steel Complex. After Iranian Revolution Iranian supplies were cut off.

In 2006, Azerbaijan began a swap deal with Iran, providing gas through the Baku-Astara line to Iran; while Iran supplies Nakhchivan. On 11 November 2009, the State Oil Company of Azerbaijan (SOCAR) and National Iranian Gas Company signed a memorandum according to which Azerbaijani will supply 500 million cubic meters of natural gas per year starting from 2010.

== Technical features ==
The overall length of the pipeline is 1,474.5 kilometres (916.2 mi), of which 296.5 kilometres (184.2 mi) in Azerbaijan. The pipe diameter is 1,020 millimetres (40 in) and it had original capacity of 10 billion cubic meters of natural gas per year at 55 standard atmospheres (5,600 kPa). The Iranian section of the pipeline is known as IGAT1.
