= Pəlikəş =

- Municipality
- Location within Azerbaijan
- Coordinates: 38°31′21″N 48°39′16″E
- Country: Azerbaijan
- Rayon: Astara

Population
  - Total: 1,587
- Time zone: UTC+4 (AZT)
  - Summer (DST): UTC+5 (AZT)

Pəlikəş (also, Palikesh, Palikyash, and Palokyat) is a village and municipality in the Astara Rayon of Azerbaijan. It has a population of 1,587.
