= Qapıçıməhəllə =

Azerbaijani village

Coordinates: 38°27′N 48°50′E

Qapıçıməhəllə is a village and municipality in the Astara Rayon of Azerbaijan. It has a population of 598.
