= Sipiyəpart =

- Municipality
- Location within Azerbaijan
- Coordinates: 38°31′56″N 48°36′22″E
- Country: Azerbaijan
- Rayon: Astara

Population
  - Total: 616
- Time zone: UTC+4 (AZT)
  - Summer (DST): UTC+5 (AZT)

Sipiyəpart (also, Sipiyət, Sipiya, and Sipiyad) is a village and municipality in the Astara Rayon of Azerbaijan. It has a population of 616. The municipality consists of the villages of Sipiyəpart and Çükəş.
