= Diqo =

- Village
- Location within Azerbaijan
- Coordinates: 38°29′N 48°36′E
- Country: Azerbaijan
- Rayon: Astara
- Municipality: Şəvqo
- Time zone: UTC+4 (AZT)

Diqo (also, Digo) is a village in the Astara Rayon of Azerbaijan. The village forms part of the municipality of Şəvqo.
