= Kazim Azimov =

Azerbaijani sociologist

- Kazım Əzimov
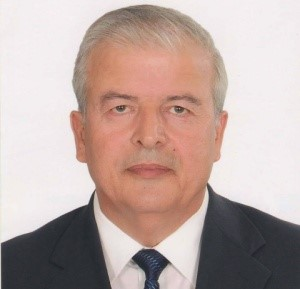
- Born: February 10, 1951 (age 75); Astara, Azerbaijan SSR, Soviet Union (now Azerbaijan)
- Citizenship: Azerbaijan
- Education: Baku State University, Harvard University, Moscow State University, University of Hawaiʻi.

Kazim Azimov Agamirza (Azerbaijani: Kazım Ağamirzə oğlu Əzimov; born February 10, 1951, Astara, Azerbaijan SSR, USSR) is an Azerbaijani historian of philosophy, culture, sociologist, Orientalist, specialist in the field of history of ancient and medieval philosophy of the Middle East and Azerbaijan. He received a doctorate of sciences in philosophy (1989) and became a professor (1991).

== Biography ==
Kazim Azimov was born on February 10, 1951, in Astara, Azerbaijan. His parents were secondary school teachers. His maternal grandfather was engaged in philanthropic activities, and his paternal grandfather was a connoisseur of the Qur’an and Islamic knowledge. His father was a public figure and was awarded an “Honored Teacher of the Azerbaijan SSR”. After finishing secondary school in 1968, he studied at the faculty of English and Azerbaijani languages at the Institute of Foreign Languages (now the Azerbaijan University of Languages or AUL). He graduated with honors from AUL in 1973. The same year, he was assigned as a teacher of the English language at AUL.

He served in the Soviet army in 1974. He continued his studies at the Moscow State University postgraduate school (Aspirantura) for a PhD (Candidate of Sciences) in philosophy (1975-1978). He defended his Candidate of Sciences thesis in 1979, titled “Ethical Thought of Medieval Azerbaijan and Critique of Western Orientalism”, at the philosophy faculty of Moscow State University after M. V. Lomonosov. In 1980-1982 he continued learning Arabic and Persian languages at the faculty of Oriental Studies at the Azerbaijan State University (now Baku State University). After completing his doctoral studies (doktorantura) in 1983-1986 for a doctor in sciences in philosophy at the philosophy faculty of Moscow State University after M. V. Lomonosov, he successfully defended therein his doctoral thesis in 1989, titled “Man in Ancient and Medieval Philosophy of Azerbaijan (in the context of Middle East)”. In 1990 he became a professor of Social Sciences.

== Scientific and pedagogical activity ==
Since the 1970s, Prof. Azimov has been combining the scientific research with his teaching activity at different universities. In 1979, Prof. Serafim Timofeevich Melyukhin, then the Dean of the Faculty of Philosophy at the Moscow State University, Corresponding (Associate) Member of the USSR Academy of Sciences, recommended Azimov as a teacher of philosophy for foreign students at the Moscow University of Friendship of Peoples named after Patrice Lumumba (now Peoples' Friendship University of Russia).

In 1980-1998s he worked as a teacher, Associate Professor, Professor, Head of the Department of Social Sciences at the Azerbaijan State Institute of Arts, Head of the Department of Philosophy and Sociology, Dean of the Faculty of Social Sciences and Law at the Khazar University in Baku. From 1998 to the present, he is a professor of sociology, history and methodology of sociology at Baku State University.

Since 2000s he has taught and researched at universities of United States and Europe as a visiting professor and senior research fellow.

== Key ideas and concepts ==
In his monograph “Azerbaijani thinkers about human nature” (Baku, 1986), Kazim Azimov considers Azerbaijani medieval philosophical thought in the context of the philosophy of the Middle East, and compares it with classical Greek, in particular, Hellenistic philosophy. For the first time in the Soviet and Western academic literature, he has undertaken a semiotic approach to the medieval Middle Eastern and Azerbaijani culture and philosophy. As a result, the idea of polyfunctionality of medieval Muslim cultural texts, and the classification of the languages of medieval cultures, including philosophy of Middle East and Azerbaijan, were theoretically grounded. Medieval Islamic philosophical thought was usually defined as materialistic pantheism in soviet academic literature. For an accurate terminological and conceptual definition of God and His relationship to the world and man in medieval Islamic philosophy, Kazim Azimov thought up a new term - “Theopantism” (Greek words, “theos” – “God”, and “panth”, “pass” - “all”, which literally means that “God is all”). Kazim Azimov redefined the Islamic medieval philosophy as a “universal undivided all-unity in diversities”. In this connection, Kazim Azimov proposes two alternative conceptions for medieval Islamic philosophy - the “mythological-poetic panentism” and the “transcendental philosophy of the all-unity”, i.e. religious, mystical and philosophical-intellectualistic Theopantism. He substantiates that Middle Eastern, including Azerbaijani medieval religious, mystical-poetic and philosophical thoughts are adequate to these two forms. He also advocates the non-dialectical nature of binary oppositions or “dual code” in medieval Islamic thought, in which, according to Prof. Azimov, the medieval Islamic thinkers themselves have clearly distinguished between the logical basis of knowing and the immanent ontological causality of the material world. The meanings of binary oppositions in Islam refer to the highest order of traditional metaphysical Reality, devoid of material space-time dimensions. In the meantime, modern researchers, beginning with the pantheist Baruch Spinoza, identify, confuse, and finally mix the logical basis of the knowledge of the Superior Reality with ontological basis (causality) of the existence or formation of the material world. And thus they blur the line between transcendentalism of God, manifested in the worlds of noumena and phenomena, and the immanent ontological causality of material beings. Kazim Azimov also analyzed the modern Western concepts of Orientalism in colonial and post-colonial perspectives.

The second monograph by Kazim Azimov “The problem of man in the religious and philosophical doctrines of Zoroastrianism and Islam” (Baku, 2009) continues his studies in eternally “old” and “new” questions about human existence - ideas related to the valuable world of man in the religious and philosophical doctrines of Zoroastrianism and Islam. The problems of religious and philosophical anthropology of Zoroastrianism and Islam in domestic and foreign academic literature have not been analytically studied before. Kazim Azimov has made the problem of man as the object of his studies in this monograph. In it, the author adheres to the concept of continuity//discontinuity of philosophical thoughts in the countries of the Middle East, including Azerbaijan, Central Eurasia and the Mediterranean, which is based on a contrasting examination of cultures and civilizations in the given region. In connection with this development, within the framework of a strict chronology of the era of antiquity, more precisely before the emergence of Islam in the East and Christianity in the West, it introduces the concept of a Central Eurasian geocultural continuum. Kazim Azimov emphasizes that Zoroastrian philosophical tradition is an integral part of the given cultural space and time. In the past it was a kind of universal language of the ancient Middle East and Azerbaijan. According to this conception, the direction of philosophical developments in the region changes due to the emergence of Christianity and Islam. For the first time, Kazim Azimov exposes the paradigms of the Zoroastrian and Islamic religious-philosophical anthropologies, picks up their convergences. The Zoroastrian and Islamic religious, mystical and philosophical anthropologies are considered not only as an aggregate of beliefs, cults, rituals, but also as definite historical forms of values-laden knowledge about human existence. K. Azimov argues that the sociocultural context, the ideological and worldview contents of Zoroastrianism and Islam, in which traditions play a significant role, set up a common base for philosophical paradigms on the issues of man. According to this conception, the state of things is intimately connected with the nature of the prophetic cultures, which represent not a type of free will, but an exemplar of knowing the totality of immutable truths, revealed by a true creator, i.e. God and his messengers.

== Reception and review ==
Soviet specialists spoke positively about the Zoroastrian and Islamic religious, mystical and philosophical anthropology, argued by Kazim Azimov. This is evidenced by the positive feedbacks, comments and recommendation letters written by well-known Western experts in the field . Modern Western experts gave both the positive and critical assessments.

Michael Weinstein, a professor of sociology at the University of Hawaiʻi and Harvard University, wrote:

The publication of the monograph by my colleague Kazim Azimov delighted me. His concept of Orientalism is very close to the traditions of rationalistic humanism. He himself is an example of the preservation and multiplication of these traditions in modern academic culture. I am still learning from him.

Anne Sheppard, Professor of Classical Greek Philosophy and Literature at the University of London, concludes:

"The monograph by Professor Asimov shows how he skillfully applies the semiotic approach to Islamic thought in a productive and stimulating way. I commend his proposal to you as groundbreaking comparative study of the linguistic aspects of mystical religion and philosophy and hope that it will be considered favorably″.

Professor and Chair of Islamic Studies at the University of Michigan Alexander Knysh writes:

"Professor Azimov is a prominent specialist in Sufism studies in Azerbaijan ... He has published extensively in this field and is currently working on a new project that conducts a semiotic study in the spiritual and esoteric aspects of Christian, Jewish and Islamic religious and philosophical systems. I commend his project as an innovative comparative study of the linguistic and semiotic characteristics of mystical religion and philosophy.Prof. Azimov's proposal makes clear how he relates semiotic concepts to Islamic thought in fruitful and thought-provoking way″.r

Professor of Philosophy of Islam and Central Asia at the University of Hawaiʻi Tamara Albertini writes:

Professor Azimov is a notable expert in culture and philosophy studies of the Middle East, Central Asia and the South Caucasus. I recommend him for teaching at U.S. universities as a talented historian of philosophy and culture. By hiring him, any American university will benefit.

== Visiting professorships ==
Since the 2000s, Kazin Azimov was invited by a number of foreign universities as a visiting professor:

- 2000-2001 - University of Harvard and University of Hawaiʻi (USA, 1 year).
- 2003 - Central European University, Budapest (7 months).
- 2004 - George Mason University, Fairfax, Virginia, (USA, 3 months).
- 2004 - British Academy, University of London and University of Liverpool (1 month).
- 2004 - Boğaziçi University, Istanbul (1 month).
- 2005 - Georg August University, Göttingen, Germany (4 months).
- 2006 - Free University of Berlin, Germany (4 months).
- 2009 - Free University of Berlin, Germany (4 months).
- 2011 - Aristotle University of Thessaloniki, Greece (7 months).
- 2017 - University of Malmö, Faculty of Culture and Society, Sweden (4 months).

== Selected Scientific Works ==
=== Monographs ===
- Problema cheloveka v religiozno-filosofskikh doktrinakh zoroastrianizma i islama. Baku 2003, 303 P. (The Problem of Man in the Religious and Philosophical Doctrines of Zoroastrianism and Islam. Baku, 2003, 303 P.) Available at the Harvard Widener Library.
- Azerbaydjanskie misliteli o cheloveke. Baku 1986, 207 P. (Medieval Azerbaijani Thinkers about the Human nature. Baku, 1986, 207 p. ). Available at the Harvard Widener Library.
- Tsennostniy mir cheloveka v religiozno-filosofskoy doktrine Zoroastrianizma. Baku 1991, 122 P. (The Valuable World of Man in the Religious and Philosophical Doctrines of Zoroastrianism. Baku "Society of Knowledge” 1991, 122 P.).
- Problema cheloveka i obshestva v drevney i srednevekovoy sosialnoy filosofii Azerbaydjana i Tsentralnoy Azii. Moskva “INION” Akademiya Nauk, 1987 (No. 25485), 350 P. (The Problem of Man in Ancient and Medieval Social Philosophy of Azerbaijan and Central Asia. Moscow, deposited in Academy of Sciences. Moscow, 1987, (No. 25485), 350 P.).

== Sources ==
- Professor. K.A. Azimov.
- Müstəqil Azərbaycanda Fəlsəfə və Filosoflar. Bakı 2007, S.234-236. (Philosophy and Philosophers in Sovereign Azerbaijan. Bakı, 2007, pp. 234–236).
- Avesta. Bakı 2017, S. 2-3. (Avest. Baku, 2017, pp. 2–3).
- Azimov, Kiazim. Problema cheloveka v religiozno-filosofskikh doktrinakh zoroastrianizma i islama. Baku 2003. Available at the Harvard Widener Library.
- Azimov, Kiazim. Azerbaydjanskie misliteli o cheloveke. Baku 1986.Available at the Harvard Widener Library.
- Online Lectures for students at Malmö University, Sweden, by Prof. Azimov:
- Part 1. Azerbaijani Multiculturalism Model.
- Part 2. Multiculturalism as a response to ethnic and linguistic diversities.
- Part 3. Multiculturalism and religious diversity in Azerbaijan.
- Социальные, этические и эстетические взгляды аль-Фараби. Под. ред. А. Сагадеев, М. Бурабаев, Г. Курмагалиева. М., Наука, 1984.
- ALexander Murinson. Turkey's Entente with Israel and Azerbaijan State identity and security in the Middle East and Caucasus. New York: Routledge 2010.
- Vitalie Nicon Marinuta. Evolution of Transdniestrian Conflict in the Republic of Moldova: Prospects for its Solution. Thesis. California, Monterey 2004.
- Ien B. Philosophy of the Caucasus and the Central Asia in the Soviet period. – In: Studies in Soviet Thought. Dordrecht (Holland), Boston (USA), 1982, vol. 23, No. 4, pp. 285–299.
