= Fort No. 5 =

- U.S. National Register of Historic Places
- Alabama Register of Landmarks and Heritage
- Sketch of the Defenses of Columbus, Fort No. 5 at far left
- Interactive map of Fort No. 5
- Location: Opelika Rd., Phenix City, Alabama
- Coordinates: 32°29′00″N 85°02′04″W
- Built: 1863
- NRHP reference No.: 76000354

Significant dates
- Added to NRHP: May 6, 1976
- Designated ARLH: August 20, 1975

Fort No. 5 is a historic American Civil War fort in Phenix City, Alabama. It was built in 1863 as one of eight forts for the defense of Columbus, Georgia, which was a major producer of war materiel for the Confederacy. The pentagonal fort is 30 yards (27 m) per side, with earthen walls. During the Battle of Columbus on April 16, 1865, the Confederate army was badly undermanned, and Fort No. 5 was left unoccupied as the Union Army captured Columbus.

The fort was listed on the National Register of Historic Places in 1976.
