= Qatar–Turkey pipeline =

Proposed natural gas pipeline

Qatar-Turkey pipeline

Location
- Country: Qatar, Turkey
- Direction: East–West
- Start: Qatar
- To: Turkey (with links from there to Europe)

General information
- Type: Natural gas

The Qatar–Turkey pipeline was a proposal to build a natural gas pipeline from the Iranian–Qatari South Pars/North Dome Gas-Condensate field towards Turkey, where it could connect with the Nabucco pipeline to supply European customers as well as Turkey. One proposed route to Turkey was via Saudi Arabia, Jordan, and Syria, and another was through Saudi Arabia, Kuwait and Iraq.

After the fall of Assad regime, the Turkish Energy Minister Alparslan Bayraktar stated that the pipeline project could be revived if: 'Syria achieves its territorial integrity and stability.'

== See also ==
- Iran–Iraq–Syria pipeline
