= Pensər =

- Municipality
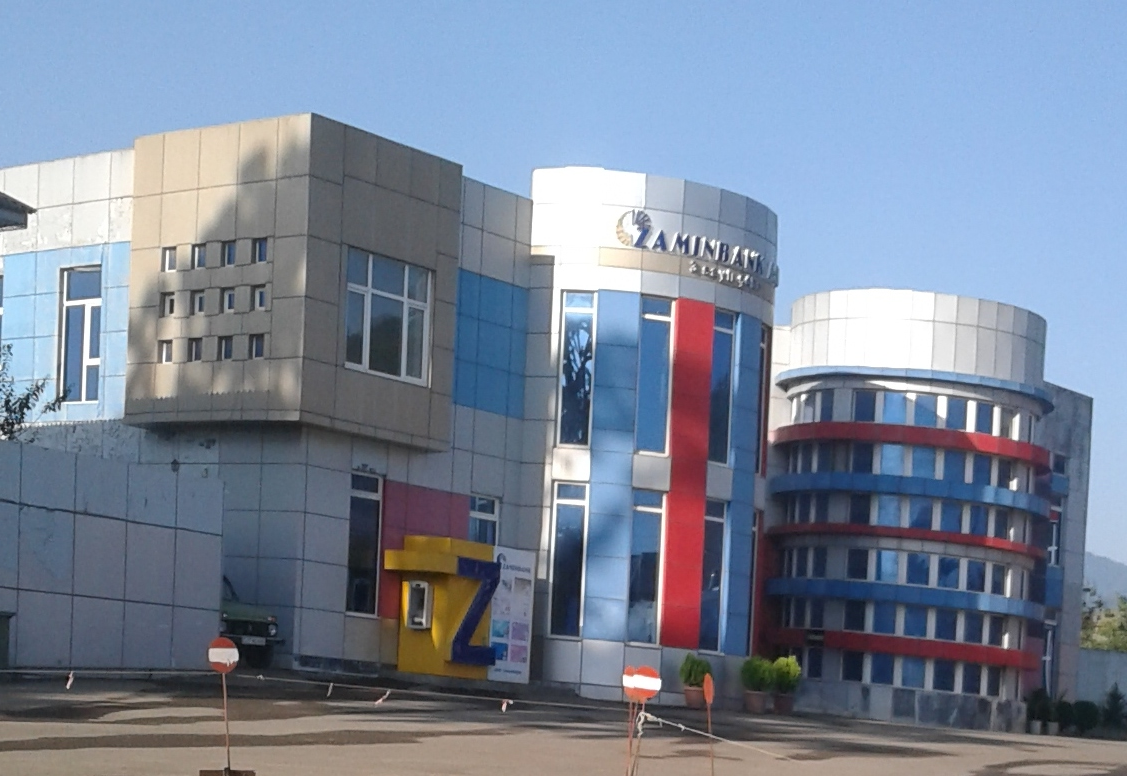
- Bank in Pensər

- Location within Azerbaijan
- Coordinates: 38°36′48″N 48°49′02″E
- Country: Azerbaijan
- Rayon: Astara

Population
  - Total: 4,702
- Time zone: UTC+4 (AZT)
  - Summer (DST): UTC+5 (AZT)

Pensər is a village and municipality in the Astara Rayon of Azerbaijan. It has a population of 4,702.
