= Drug-induced gingival enlargement =

Swelling of gums due to side effect of medications

Drug-induced gingival enlargement (DIGE), also referred to as drug-induced gingival hyperplasia (DIGH) or drug-induced gingival overgrowth (DIGO), is a side effect of many systemic medications for which the Gingervae are not the target receptor. It is normally resultant of medications including immunoregulators, calcium channel blockers and anticonvulsants. When allowed to progress assisted by routinely poor oral hygiene, DIGE can lead to pain and disfigurement, however there are great variations in its presentation and severity dependent on the case. It is suggested that enlargement is aided by genetic predispositions, tending to occur more frequently in the papillae of the anterior Gingivae in younger age groups.

== Class of drugs ==
The main classes of drugs that result in gingival hyperplasia are as follows.

| Category | Pharmacologic agent |
| Anticonvulsants | Phenytoin Sodium valproate |
| Immunoregulating drugs | Ciclosporine Tacrolimus Sirolimus |
| Calcium channel blockers | Nifedipine Verapamil Diltiazem Amlodipine Felodipine |

=== Anticonvulsants ===
Anticonvulsant agents, such as phenytoin, are associated with common forms of gingival overgrowth. It is caused by the increase of metabolites from the breakdown of anticonvulsants in the body. It should also be noted that concurrent usage of different anticonvulsants in children has resulted in accumulative gingival enlargement.

=== Immunosuppressive drugs ===
Immunoregulators are often prescribed to patients who have organ transplantations and/or some autoimmune diseases. Common immunosuppressive drugs linked to gingival hyperplasia are cyclosporin and tacrolimus.

The most frequently used immunosuppressive drug is cyclosporin, which is commonly prescribed after an organ transplant. Nearly 53% of patients taking cyclosporin after renal transplants presented with gingival growth. Inflammation from bacterial overgrowth in the gingiva and cyclosporin's main metabolite, hydroxycyclosporin, stimulate production of collagen, while simultaneously inhibiting collagen breakdown — leading to a net increase in production of gingival tissues. Tacrolimus, on the other hand, is less toxic than cyclosporin, causing less severe gingival overgrowth, hepatic and renal toxicity.

== Management ==
If gingival overgrowth becomes a legitimate concern, initial management would be proper oral hygiene habits as it is the least invasive option to alleviate overgrowth. Otherwise, it may also be advisable to cease medication, although this should only be done with the patients’ medical practitioners’ consent, and complete resorption may still take up to 8 weeks. In cases where medication cannot be paused, patients’ medical practitioners or consultants should be consulted to discuss treatment options. Replacement drugs may be suggested. For example, vigabatrin may substitute phenytoin as anticonvulsant. However, this method may be ineffective for long-standing overgrowth.

Another option is the surgical removal of excess tissue via gingivectomy. This method is widely successful, although recurrence has been reported for certain drugs. Nonetheless, the procedure is associated with risk of hemorrhage in the highly inflamed and vascularized gingiva. As such, CO_{2} laser or ND:YAG laser has been suggested for accurate, cauterized, and sterilized incisions. Other nonsurgical interventions such as fast mimicking diet regime and nonsurgical periodontal therapy has also been suggested for alleviating gingival overgrowth, thus reducing the need for surgical intervention. However, they could not prevent or fully resolve gingival overgrowth alone.
