= Iran Gas Trunkline =

Pipeline network for the distribution of natural gas

Iran's Oil and Gas Fields and Infrastructures

The Iran Gas Trunkline (IGAT) is a series of large diameter pipelines constructed from gas refineries in the south of Iran (Khuzestan and Bushehr provinces) in order to transfer natural gas to consumption centers across the country.

As of 2024, there are ten trunklines in operation and one under construction

== History ==
IGAT1 was completed in October 1970, supplying gas to the Southern Caucasus republics of the Soviet Union. In 1975 the National Iranian Gas Company concluded agreements with Ruhrgas, Gaz de France, the Soviet Union, and Austria's OMV, to supply gas to Western Europe via a proposed IGAT2. Under the arrangement, Iran was to supply additional gas to the Soviet Union, while the Soviet Union was to supply gas to Czechoslovakia from its own gas fields in Siberia. Construction of IGAT2 was halted following the Iranian revolution.

== Main transmission lines ==
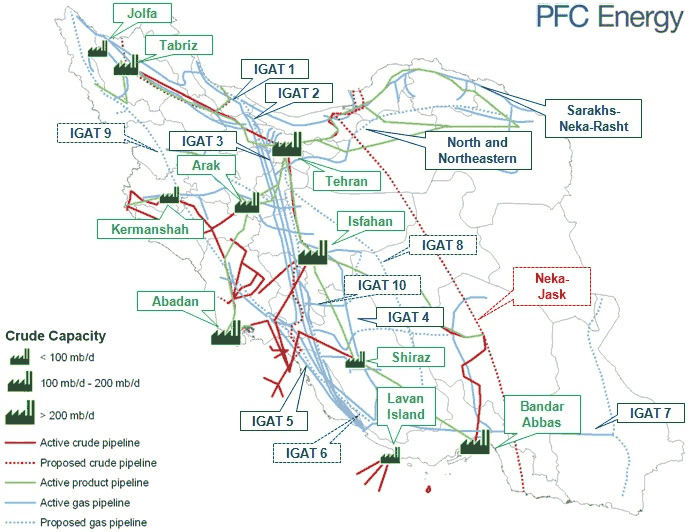
Iran Gas Trunkline

- IGAT1, 42 inches (1,070 mm) in diameter, was constructed between Bid Boland Refinery in Khūzestān Province and Astara in North.
- IGAT2, 56 inches (1,420 mm) in diameter, was constructed between fajr jam Refinery in Bushehr province and Qazvin in north.
- IGAT3, 56 inches (1,420 mm) in diameter, was constructed between Asalouyeh and Central Province and ultimately to north west of the country.
- IGAT4, 56 inches (1,420 mm) in diameter, transfers natural gas produced in South Pars phases 1 to 5 from Asalouyeh to Fars and Isfahan provinces.
- IGAT5, 56 inches (1,420 mm) in diameter, transfers sour gas produced in phases 6, 7 and 8 to Khūzestān Province to be injected into the oil wells.
- IGAT6, 56 inches (1,420 mm) in diameter, transfers natural gas produced in South Pars phases 6 to 10 from Asalouyeh to Khūzestān Province to be consumed there, in the west of the country, and in Iraq. See also: Iran-Iraq-Syria pipeline
- IGAT7, 56 inches (1,420 mm) in diameter, interconnects east of Asalouyeh to Hormozgān Province and Sar-Khoon Refinery and transfers natural gas produced in South Pars to Hormozgān, Sistan, Baluchestan and Kermān provinces.
- IGAT8, 56 inches (1,420 mm) in diameter, originates in east of Asalouyeh and passes by Parsian Refinery in Fars Province onto Isfahan province and then to Qom province.
- IGAT9 (Europe Gas Export Line), 56 inches (1,420 mm) in diameter, originates in east of Asalouyeh and passes by western provinces (Khūzestān, Īlām, Kurdistan and Azerbaijan) and reaches Turkey's border.
- IGAT10 The pipeline runs from Khuzestan and Bushehr Provinces in the south of Iran to the northern part of the country.It has an estimated transport capacity of 2,472.03 million cubic feet per day (70,000 million cubic centimeter), with a length of 393 miles / 632 km. Iran Daily reported in October 2014 that Iran Gas Trunkline-10 (IGAT-10) was expected to become operational in December.
- IGAT11 Iran Gas Trunkline-11 (IGAT-11) is an under construction gas transmission pipeline that would be operated by National Iranian Gas Company. With a proposed diameter of 56 inches (1,420 mm) and a proposed length of 746 miles / 1200 km, it would be capable of transporting 110,000 million centimeter cubed a day, from the southern city of Asalouyeh in Bushehr Province through Ahvaz, Dehgolan, to the Bazargan district and border crossing point in West Azerbaijan Province in the northwest. The project is estimated to cost 4 billion dollars. Construction is assumed to have started in 2022 and is expected to be running in 2025. The construction scope will also include 7 gas pressure stations that will be built along the pipeline route.

== See also ==
- NIOC Recent Discoveries
- Iran Natural Gas Reserves
- South Pars
- North Pars
- Kish Gas Field
- Golshan Gas Field
- Ferdowsi Gas Field
