= Iran–Iraq–Syria pipeline =

Proposed pipeline supplying gas to Europe

Iran-Iraq-Syria pipeline

Location
- Country: Iran, Iraq, Syria
- Direction: east–west
- Start: Asaluyeh, Iran
- Passes through: Damascus, Syria

General information
- Type: Natural gas

Technical information
- Length: 5,600 km (3,500 mi)
- Maximum discharge: 110 million cubic metres of natural gas per day
- Diameter: 56 in (1,422 mm)

The Iran–Iraq–Syria pipeline (called the Friendship Pipeline by the governments involved and the Islamic gas pipeline by some Western sources) is a proposed natural gas pipeline running from the Iranian South Pars/North Dome Gas-Condensate field towards Europe via Iran, Iraq, Syria and Lebanon to supply European customers as well as Iraq, Syria and Lebanon. The pipeline was planned to be 5,600 km (3,500 mi) long and have a diameter of 142 centimetres (56 in). A previous proposal, known as the Persian Pipeline, had seen a route from Iran's South Pars to Europe via Turkey; it was apparently abandoned after the Swiss energy company Elektrizitätsgesellschaft Laufenburg halted its contract with Iran in October 2010 in the face of pressure over U.S. sanctions against Iran.

Iraq signed an agreement with Iran in June 2013 to receive natural gas to fuel Iraqi power plants in Baghdad and Diyala. The contract covers 40 million m^{3} (1.4 billion ft^{3}) per day over 10 years. Iran's plans to export 5.0 million m^{3} (176 million ft^{3}) of gas per day at standard conditions to Iraq by 2015.

In July 2011 Iran, Iraq and Syria said they planned to sign a contract potentially worth around $6bn to construct a pipeline running from South Pars towards Europe, via these countries and Lebanon and then under the Mediterranean to a European country, with a refinery and related infrastructure in Damascus. In November 2012 the United States dismissed reports that construction had begun on the pipeline, saying that this had been claimed repeatedly and that "it never seems to materialize." A framework agreement was to be signed in early 2013, with costs now estimated at $10bn; construction plans were delayed by the Syrian civil war. In December 2012 the Oxford Institute for Energy Studies said that the project "remains doubtful. It is not clear how such a project will be financed given that both Iran and Syria are subject to strict financial sanctions." In July 2015, Iranian Gas Engineering and Development Company (IGEDC) and Pasargad Energy Development Company signed a BOT (build-operate-transfer) contract under which the project owner will provide 25% of finance and National Development Fund of Iran the rest for the construction of IGAT-6.

The pipeline would be a competitor to the Nabucco pipeline from Azerbaijan to Europe. It is also an alternative to the Qatar–Turkey pipeline which had been proposed by Qatar to run from Qatar to Europe via Saudi Arabia, Jordan, Syria and Turkey. Syria's rationale for rejecting the Qatar proposal was said to be "to protect the interests of [its] Russian ally, which is Europe's top supplier of natural gas."

== See also ==
- Iran Gas Trunkline
- Qatar–Turkey pipeline
