= Astara, Azerbaijan =

Astara
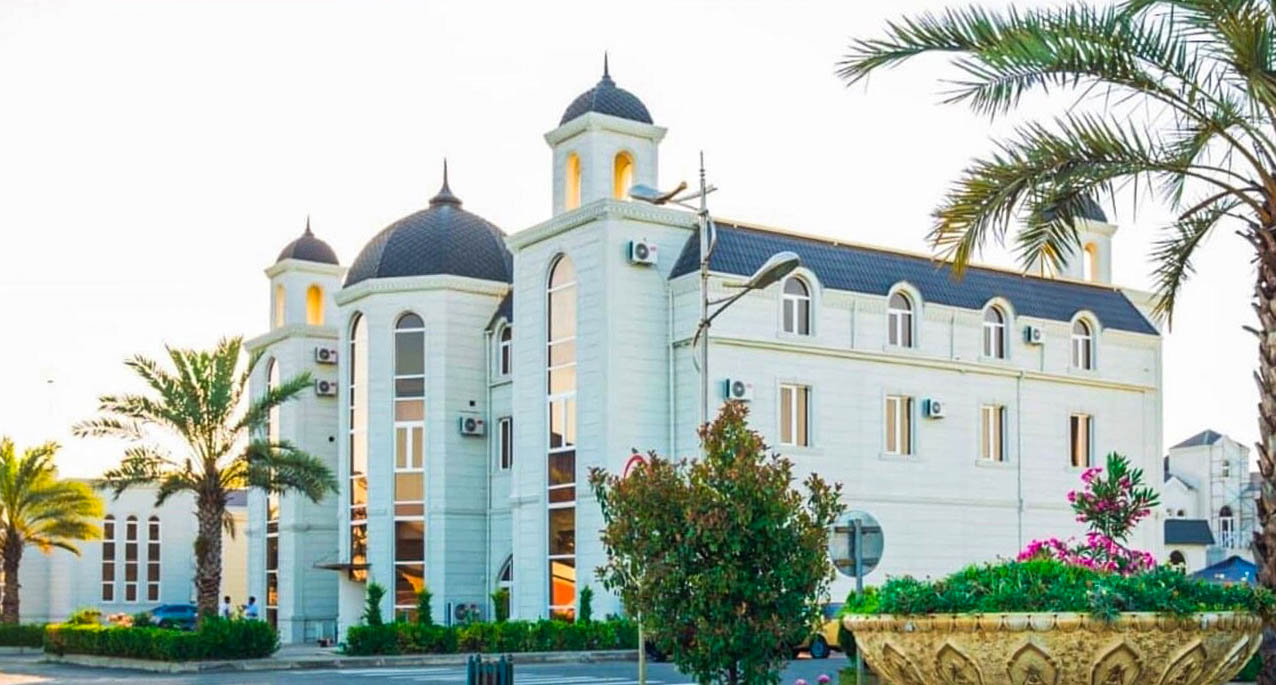
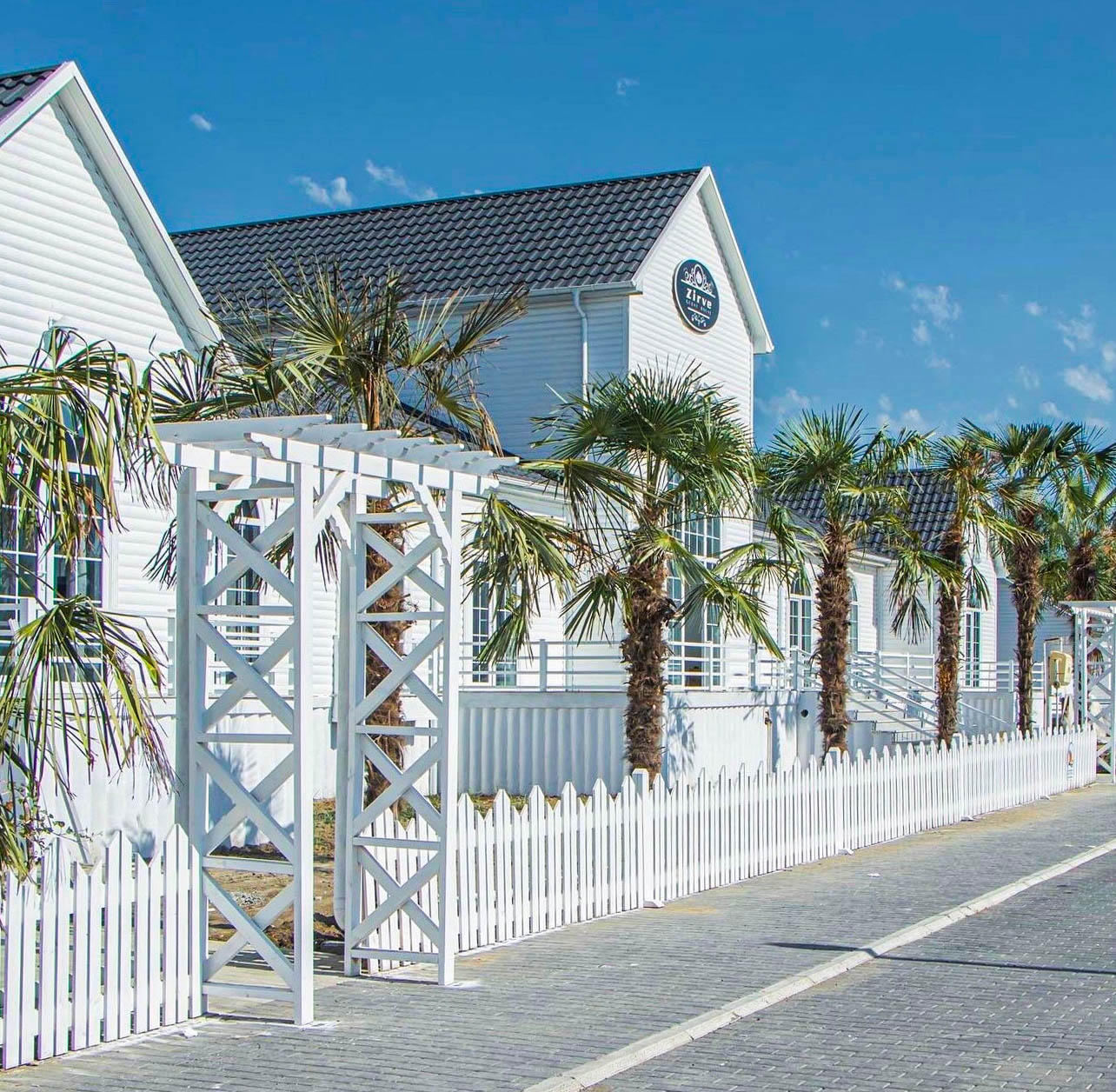
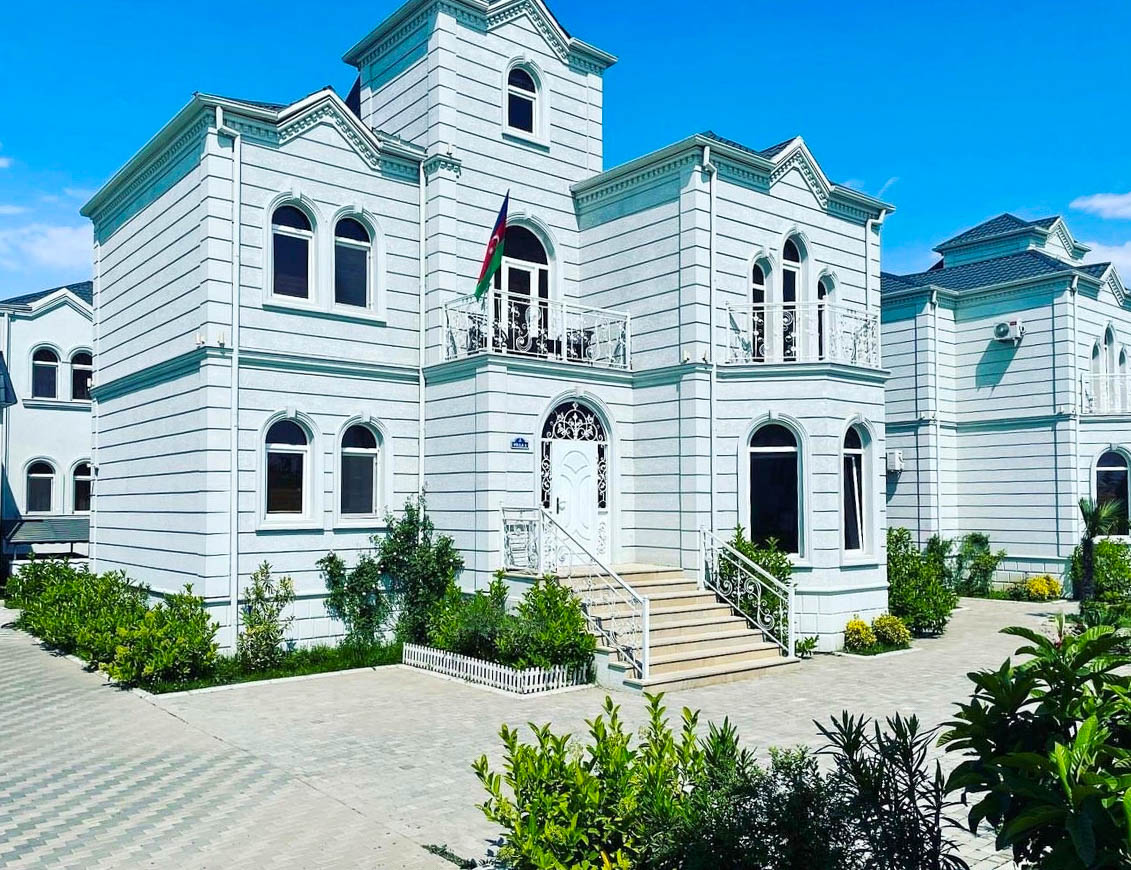
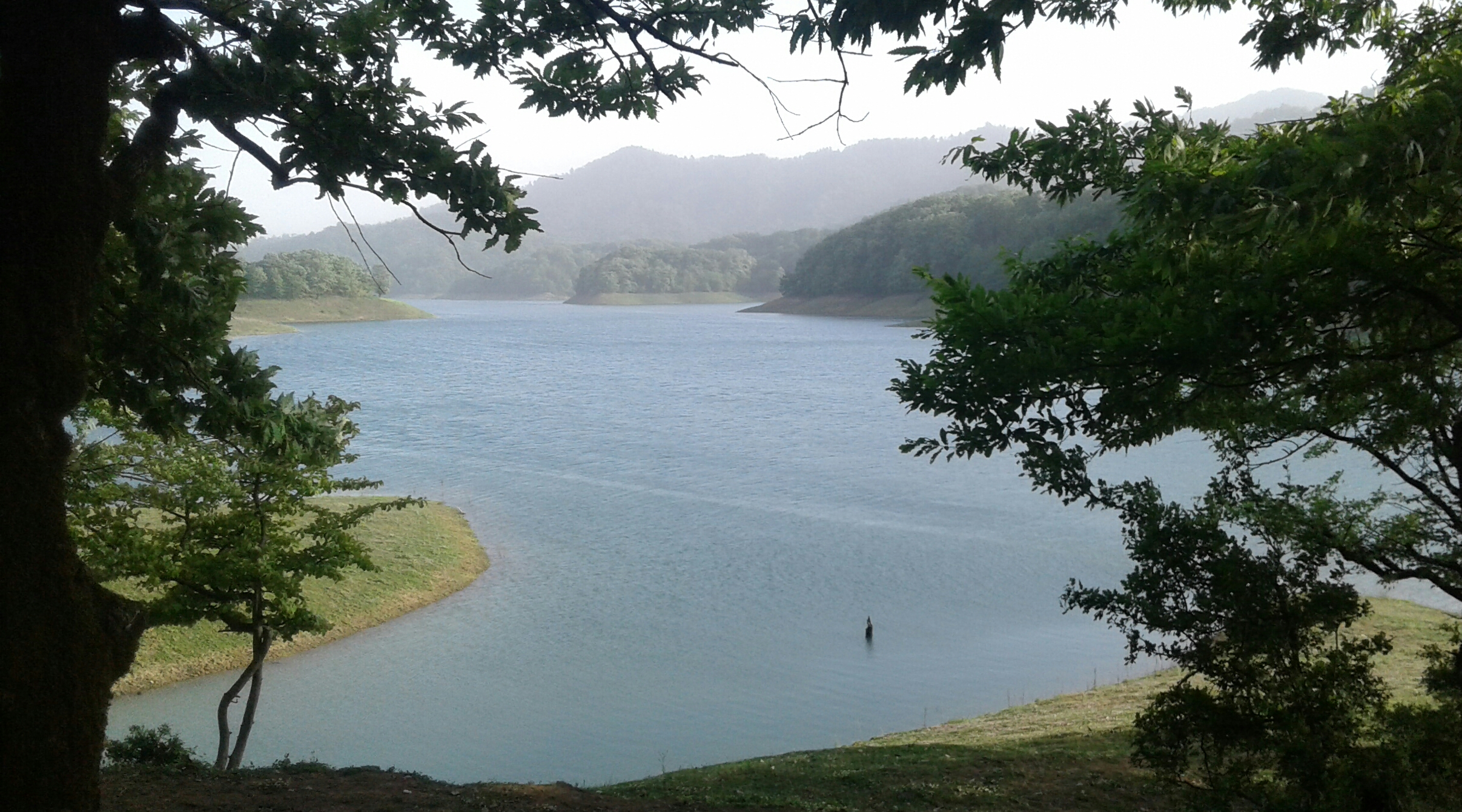
- Maricel Hotel Astara Astara beach houses Astara typical townhouses Hirkan National Park

- Location within Azerbaijan
- Coordinates: 38°27′22″N 48°52′43″E
- Country: Azerbaijan
- District: Astara
- Elevation: −22 m (−72 ft)

Population (2008)
  - Total: 16,130
- Time zone: UTC+4 (AZT)
- Area code: +994 195

Astara is a city in and the capital of the Astara District of Azerbaijan. Astara is a short walk across the border from Astara, Iran.

== Geography ==
Astara is located in the Lankaran Lowland. The area is bordered by the Talysh Mountains in the west and the Caspian Sea in the east. The district is famous for its dishes made of rare fish species from the Caspian Sea. The king of rare trees in the forests of Astara is the iron tree.

=== Climate ===
Astara has a borderline humid subtropical (Köppen climate classification: Cfa) and hot-summer mediterranean climate (Köppen climate classification: Csa). Astara has cool, wet winters and warm, humid summers with lower precipitation. The annual precipitation of the city is one of the highest in Azerbaijan.

Climate data for Astara (1971-1990 normals)
| Month | Jan | Feb | Mar | Apr | May | Jun | Jul | Aug | Sep | Oct | Nov | Dec | Year |
|---|---|---|---|---|---|---|---|---|---|---|---|---|---|
| Mean daily maximum °C (°F) | 7.7 (45.9) | 7.7 (45.9) | 10.5 (50.9) | 16.4 (61.5) | 21.5 (70.7) | 26.6 (79.9) | 29.9 (85.8) | 29.0 (84.2) | 25.5 (77.9) | 19.6 (67.3) | 14.7 (58.5) | 10.9 (51.6) | 18.3 (65.0) |
| Daily mean °C (°F) | 4.5 (40.1) | 4.7 (40.5) | 6.4 (43.5) | 11.4 (52.5) | 16.6 (61.9) | 21.2 (70.2) | 24.2 (75.6) | 23.3 (73.9) | 20.3 (68.5) | 15.4 (59.7) | 10.7 (51.3) | 6.8 (44.2) | 13.8 (56.8) |
| Mean daily minimum °C (°F) | 2.4 (36.3) | 2.5 (36.5) | 4.9 (40.8) | 9.6 (49.3) | 14.2 (57.6) | 18.7 (65.7) | 20.8 (69.4) | 20.6 (69.1) | 18.3 (64.9) | 13.6 (56.5) | 8.5 (47.3) | 4.3 (39.7) | 11.5 (52.8) |
| Average precipitation mm (inches) | 85 (3.3) | 89 (3.5) | 99 (3.9) | 54 (2.1) | 56 (2.2) | 35 (1.4) | 34 (1.3) | 64 (2.5) | 190 (7.5) | 288 (11.3) | 167 (6.6) | 103 (4.1) | 1,264 (49.7) |
| Average rainy days | 9 | 9 | 12 | 7 | 8 | 4 | 3 | 5 | 9 | 14 | 11 | 9 | 100 |
| Mean monthly sunshine hours | 113.3 | 99.4 | 110.9 | 152.4 | 208.9 | 268.3 | 284.9 | 248.5 | 185.9 | 127.3 | 101.5 | 110.9 | 2,012.2 |
| Mean daily sunshine hours | 3.7 | 3.5 | 3.6 | 5.1 | 6.7 | 8.9 | 9.2 | 8.0 | 6.2 | 4.1 | 3.4 | 3.6 | 5.5 |
Source: NOAA DWD

Climate data for Astara (records)
| Month | Jan | Feb | Mar | Apr | May | Jun | Jul | Aug | Sep | Oct | Nov | Dec | Year |
|---|---|---|---|---|---|---|---|---|---|---|---|---|---|
| Record high °C (°F) | 22.1 (71.8) | 26.1 (79.0) | 28.8 (83.8) | 29.0 (84.2) | 33.4 (92.1) | 38.0 (100.4) | 38.0 (100.4) | 40.0 (104.0) | 40.0 (104.0) | 31.3 (88.3) | 28.7 (83.7) | 25.7 (78.3) | 40.0 (104.0) |
| Record low °C (°F) | −7.8 (18.0) | −13 (9) | −6.1 (21.0) | −3.9 (25.0) | −2.8 (27.0) | 6.0 (42.8) | 11.1 (52.0) | 10.0 (50.0) | 10.0 (50.0) | −2.8 (27.0) | −7.8 (18.0) | −15 (5) | −15 (5) |
Source: climatebase.ru

== Attractions ==
=== Caspian Sea ===
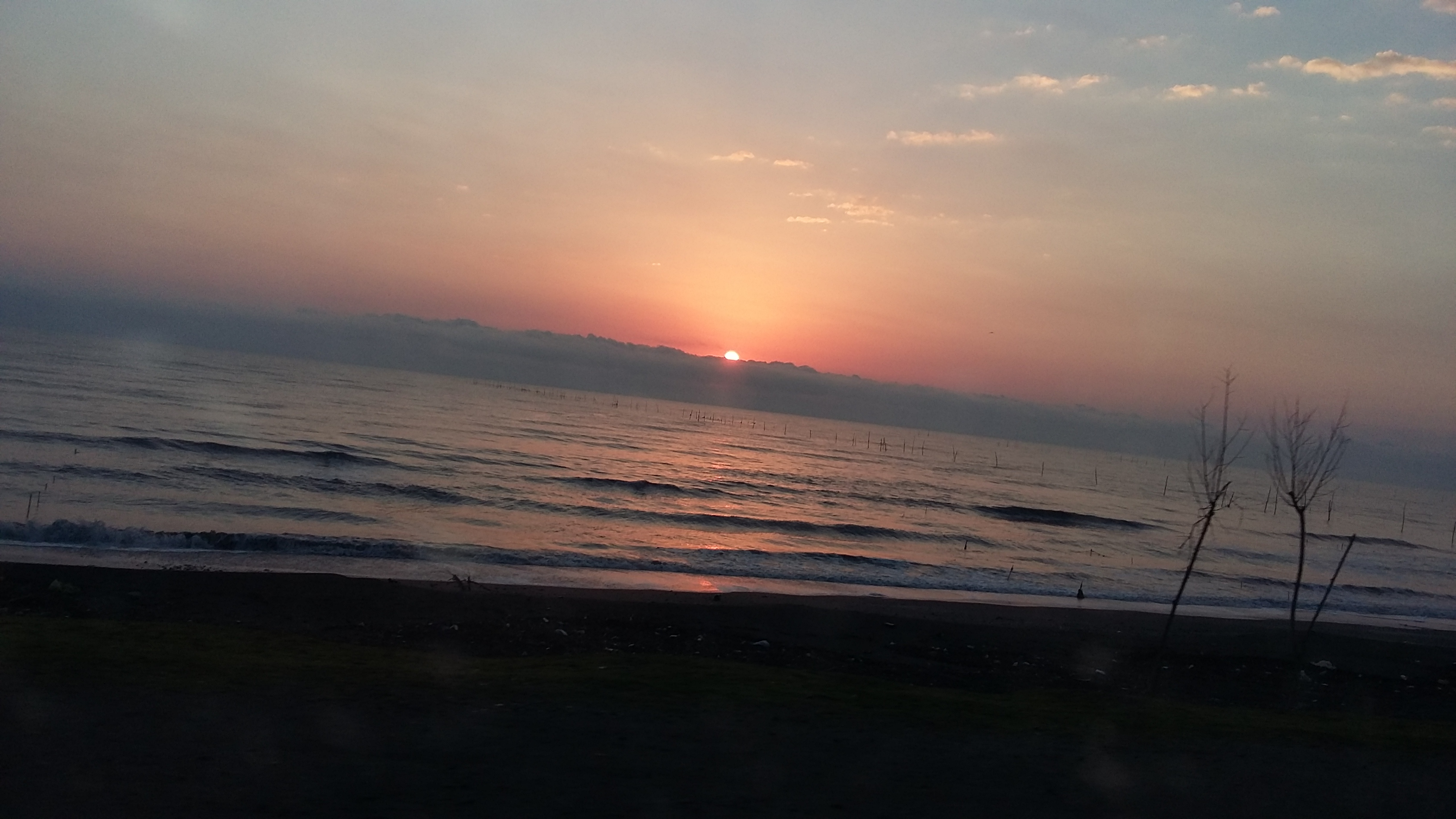
Caspian Sea, Astara

The Caspian Sea is the world's largest inland body of water, variously classed as the world's largest lake or a full-fledged sea. It is an endorheic basin (a basin without outflows) located between Europe and Asia, to the east of the Caucasus Mountains and to the west of the broad steppe of Central Asia. The sea has a surface area of 371,000 km^{2} (143,000 sq mi) (excluding the detached lagoon of Garabogazköl) and a volume of 78,200 km^{3} (18,800 mi^{3}). It has a salinity of approximately 1.2% (12 g/L), about a third of the salinity of most seawater that is found in the region.

=== Astara TV Tower ===
As the demand for television broadcasting and telecommunication grew in the early 1980s, the Astara TV Tower was built. The television tower was uniquely designed, as its pinnacle is guyed to a horizontal cross-like steel structure.

== Economy ==
Astara, a city in southern Azerbaijan nestled between the Caspian Sea and the Talysh Mountains, offers a blend of natural beauty and cultural richness, making it a popular destination for nature lovers and adventure seekers.

Astara in Azerbaijan is known for its coastline and beaches along the Caspian Sea, offering attractions like Hirkan National Park, Sym Waterfall, Yanar Bulag (Fire Spring), Shi Waterfall, and Astara Boulevard.

Astara Boulevard is a park spanning a kilometre along the Caspian Sea, offering a retreat to locals and visitors alike.

Located next to the Iranian border, Astara attracts numerous visitors from Iran, who come to Azerbaijan to purchase goods and services that may not be as readily available in Iran.

== Transport ==
Astara is currently served by a broad gauge railway only headed north. A standard gauge connection to the Iranian railway network along the shore of the Caspian Sea is planned. This break of gauge station is likely to be equipped with bogie exchange and SUW 2000 variable gauge axle track gauge changing facility.

The nearest Airport to Astara is Lankaran International Airport.

== Notable people ==
- Ziya Bunyadov (1923–1997), Azerbaijani historian and World War II veteran
- Vagif Akhundov (born 1950), colonel-general
- Kazim Azimov (born 1951), Azerbaijani historian of philosophy, culture, sociologist, Orientalist

== See also ==
- Lankaran
- Lankaran International Airport
- Bay of Baku
- Astara, Iran
