= Astara District =

District in southeastern Azerbaijan

Coordinates: 38°30′N 48°40′E

Astara District Astara rayonu
- District
- Map of Azerbaijan showing Astara District
- Country: Azerbaijan
- Region: Lankaran-Astara
- Established: 8 August 1930
- Capital: Astara
- Settlements: 92

Government
  - Governor: Gazanfar Aghayev

Area
  - Total: 620 km^{2} (240 sq mi)

Population (2020)
  - Total: 110,000
  - Density: 180/km^{2} (460/sq mi)
- Time zone: UTC+4 (AZT)
- Postal code: 0700
- Website: astara-ih.gov.az

Astara District (Azerbaijani: Astara rayonu) is one of the 66 districts of Azerbaijan. It is located in the southeast of the country, in the Lankaran-Astara Economic Region. The district borders the districts of Lankaran and Lerik, as well as the Ardabil and Gilan provinces of Iran. Its capital and largest city is Astara. As of 2020, the district had a population of 110,000.

== History ==
=== Ancient history ===
A famous mathematician, astronomer and geographer Ptolemy (c. 100 – 160s/170s) AD was one of the oldest researchers who also visited the territory of Azerbaijan. He compiled a map of the Caspian Sea in the second century, has given a clear overview on the geographical names, objects and settlements located on its shores. The names of many cities and villages belonging to Albania, as well as the name “Astara” (Greek: Astarata) are found on this map.

Another scholar of the ancient world, Strabon also pointed out the name “Astara” in his "Historical Sketches" (Historicahypomnemata). British traveler and explorer Anthony Jenkinson (1529 – 1610/1611) visited the coasts of the Caspian Sea in 1559 to establish trade relations between England and Bukhara. In 1562 he returned to London and published a book "Russia and Persia". He pointed out the names of the villages, settlements and residential areas located on the coasts of the Caspian in his book. The name Astara was mentioned as Stara in Greek in the book.

Astara, which was located on historic Silk Road, established extensive trade relations with Middle East, Central Asia and Asia Minor, China, India and the Arab world. There was Caravanserai with very ancient history in the village of Kapchimahalla located in the southwestern part of Astara. The results of the researches of the remains of this caravanserai showed that the caravanserai belongs to the 7th century.

German traveler Hans Schillerberger (1394–1427), who traveled to different Eastern countries as well asto Azerbaijan, gave information onAstara's international trade relations in his notes. The traveler noted that Astara is one of the centers of production of silk in Azerbaijan. The best type of silk produced in Astarawas exported to Damascus, Bursa, Kashan and Venice.

In the Middle Ages Astara was one of the religious, cultural and commercial centers in Azerbaijan. Especially pottery cultivation was the leading industry in the city. Later 13th century and earlier 14th century monetary was existed in the village of Mashkhan in Astara. Russian scientist A.M.Markov deeply investigated the coins produced in Derbent, Shamakhi and Tabriz, as well as in Astara. He gave detailed information about monetary in Astara. The scientist proves that the cities, which names written on the coins are present-day Azerbaijani cities. The Hulakis, Jalaris, Teymuris, their successors that ruled in different periods, minted coins in the Astara monetary. Coins of Amir Teymur's period and next period with legend "Zarbe Astara" are the coins, minted in Astara. This was proved in the works of European scientists. 16 pattern of these coins preserved in the Historical Institute, the Tajikistan National Academy of Sciences at present.

As of 1747 Astara was the capital of Talish district. Then the capital was moved from Astara to Lankaran. During moving many ancient construction and architecture objects, fortifications were destroyed. German traveler Adam Oleary (1599–1671), who was also a scientist, visited Astara in 1638 and gave certain interesting information about its territory, residents and culture. The traveler pointed out in his notes that Astara was located on the shore of the Caspian Sea. There were very large grapevines. Strabon also wrote this fact in his book. According to Strabon, one small grapevine yielded a basket of harvest in the places, named Hikaniya at that time. A big chapter of the book "Turkic countries" written by Hungarian traveler Armin Vanberin (1832–1913) was about Azerbaijan. The traveler mentioned in his book that he was in Astara and observed the local population who had beautiful folk patterns.

Famous French scientist, archeologist and traveler Jak De Morgan (1856–1934) also visited Astara. He said that he was astonished at over ground and underground recourses: "Astara is an ancient Russian town. It plays role of custom-house between Iran and Azerbaijan, as well as keeps its former peculiarity. Now it is just custom-house. Astara is exit of caravanserais and ships from Azerbaijan to Iran (Ardabil)". Famous French writer Alexander Duma gave interesting information about Astara as well.

=== Modern history ===
Astara District was established in 1930. In 1963, it was abolished as a district and its territory incorporated into Lankaran District and in 1965, its administrative district status was restored. Overall area of the district is 616.4 km^{2} (238.0 sq mi). Its population is 95,300 people. The district's capital, Astara is a small picturesque Caspian port town, on the Azerbaijan-Iran border, capital of Azerbaijan's southernmost district. Coming southbound from Lankaran, there is a giant samovar by the road welcoming visitors to the district.

Astara district is very wooded with 37,000 ha (370 km^{2}) of forests. Famous Juglans sigillata is a commonplace in Astara woods. The Astarachay and Tangarud rivers that flow through the district start at Talysh Mountains which are in the western part of the district. Highest peaks are 200 m (660 ft) above sea level. The northeastern part of the district is lowlands. A part of the Hirkan National Park is located in Astara district. Istisu, Ağ körppü, Sım, Bi, Toradi, Şeyx Nəsrullah resorts of Astara have treating mineral water. Average temperature is -1.5◦ C - 4◦C in January, 15-25◦C in July. Annual rainfall is 1200–1750 mm.

== Geography ==
Astara shares boundaries with Iran (Gilan Province) in the south, Lankaran and Lerik districts in the north, the Talysh Mountains in the west and the Caspian Sea in the east. The height of some peaks in the mountainous parts in Astara is 2000 m. Through the narrow lane on the Caspian coast anthropogenic sediments are spread, in the mountainous and foothills, the Paleogene sediments are spread. Two rivers- Tangar River and Astara River flows through the region. The forests cover about the area of 37,400 ha in Astara. The flora of Astara include chestnut oak, irontree, silk acacia, azat, as well as oak, hawthorn, peanut, walnut, golden gum, lime and so on. A part of the Hirkan National Park is located in Astara. The annual rainfall here is over 1600 mm.

"Yanar Bulag" complex, one of the geological objects in Astara, is located in the south of the village of Archivan, near the Alat-Astara highway. The spring water is rich with sulfur and methane gas. The spring is of great interest to both locals and tourists. “Istisu” (hot water), a herbal spring in Astara is known all over Azerbaijan.

=== Nature ===
Astara is located in lowland and mountain zone. The region is surrounded by the rich Talish mountain range in the west. The district is famous for its dishes made of rare fish species from the Caspian Sea. The king of rare trees in the forests of Astara is iron tree. This tree has a strategic importance, besides giving beauty to these forests. Lime, orange, kiwi, kinkan, feijoa and other citrus fruits, especially rice are grown in Astara. In the lower parts of the woods there are evergreen branches, as well as elder ones. The Caucasian Cherry creates special jungles on slightly wet slopes. Caspian Shelter dominates in the area. On the slopes of the forests, the Lankaran stream, lime and many other trees create specially mixed woods. At a slight height above the sea surface, another type of maple forms the thick woods with peanut. On the lower floors of this type of forest, blackberries, chumshads, and a small amount of granite create a special floor.

Most of the Hirkan National Park is located in the Astara region. The fauna of Astara include leopard, lynx, bear, forest cat, hedgehog, squirrel, badger, jackal, fox, wild boar, pheasants, wolves, goose, ducks, pigeons, thyme and so on.

=== Rivers ===
Astarachay River flows through the border between Azerbaijan and Iran. It flows into the Caspian Sea. The length of the river is 38 km, the basin area is 242 square km. It takes its source from the Shingan fortress (1817 m high) in the Talysh Range. About 70% of annual flows is rain water, 22% is underground waters, and 8% is snow waters. Strong floods are observed in the spring months. The river is used in irrigation. The city's name is derived from the name of Astarachay.

Astara is now famous for its environmentally friendly and high-quality rivers. In 2002 and subsequent years, Astara River was awarded the highest award and won a gold medal at the International Exhibitions held in Madrid, capital of Spain, an award in Moscow.

== Etymology ==
There are two main theories for the etymology of the city's name. One is that it derived from the Persian or Talysh word آهسته رو (Aste-ro or Aheste-ro), meaning "the place where the travel gets slower", given the marshlands that surrounded the region before.

== Architectural monuments ==
102 of the district's monuments were included in the "Distribution of Real Property and Cultural Monuments to State Protection in the Territory of the Republic of Azerbaijan" in 2001 and issued an official inventory number. According to the decree, 26 monuments are of national significance, 48 architectural monuments of local significance, 2 are monumental memorial monuments, 21 are archaeological monuments of local importance, 5 decorative. The most ancient of these monuments is the "Stone Box Necropolis" in the village of Ezettd, from the early first millennium BCE, "Miki dolmen necropolis" in Miki village. Architectural monuments include a 12th-century tomb in Shahagaj village and Sheikh Mohammed Zalani's tomb in Burzubend village.

There are more than 8,000 exhibits in the Astara Regional History and Ethnography Museum. Iron and Bronze Age include copper coins, mostly from the 9th to 12th centuries.

There are over 400 historical and architectural monuments in the district, among them a tower in Şindan village often called Babek tower, an ancient tower in Nudis village, Məşədi Abutalıb bath house, Hajı Teymur and Haji Jahanbakhish mosques in Pensər village, tomb in Şahağac village, Karbalayi Hamid Abdulla bath house in Ərçivan village. Ərçivan village has sulphur-rich springs which burn if ignited. There are stone monuments of the Stone and Bronze Ages in Qapıçıməhəllə village. Ruins of 8th-century bridges in Sipiyəpart, Seləkəran, Lomin və Pəlikəş villages are a major tourist attraction.

== Population ==
According to the State Statistics Committee, as of 2018, the population of the city recorded 107,600 persons, which increased by 22,300 persons (about 26 percent) from 85,300 persons in 2000. Of the total population, 54,100 are men and 53,500 are women. More than 26 percent of the population (about 28,100 persons) consists of young people and teenagers aged 14–29.

Population of the district by the year (at the beginning of the year, thsd. persons)
| Region | 2000 | 2001 | 2002 | 2003 | 2004 | 2005 | 2006 | 2007 | 2008 | 2009 | 2010 | 2011 | 2012 | 2013 | 2014 | 2015 | 2016 | 2017 | 2018 | 2019 | 2020 | 2021 |
|---|---|---|---|---|---|---|---|---|---|---|---|---|---|---|---|---|---|---|---|---|---|---|
| Astara region | 85,3 | 86,4 | 87,3 | 88,4 | 89,5 | 90,8 | 92,2 | 93,3 | 94,6 | 95,9 | 97,2 | 98,3 | 99,8 | 101,2 | 102,6 | 103,9 | 105,2 | 106,5 | 107,6 | 108,6 | 109,7 | 110,5 |
| urban population | 18,8 | 19,1 | 19,5 | 19,9 | 20,2 | 20,7 | 21,1 | 21,4 | 21,7 | 22,1 | 22,3 | 22,4 | 22,6 | 32,0 | 32,3 | 32,6 | 32,9 | 33,3 | 33,4 | 33,6 | 33,8 | 33,9 |
| rural population | 66,5 | 67,3 | 67,8 | 68,5 | 69,3 | 70,1 | 71,1 | 71,9 | 72,9 | 73,8 | 74,9 | 75,9 | 77,2 | 69,2 | 70,3 | 71,3 | 72,3 | 73,2 | 74,2 | 75,0 | 75,9 | 76,6 |

== Economy ==
Astara is a major source for Azerbaijan's fishing industry. Having a long coastline and inner access to rivers, the district has access to many types of marketable fish. The pipeline coming from Abadan enters Azerbaijan in Astara.

== Transport ==
The district has a border crossing into Iran, with the Iranian half of the town, also called Astara, on the other side of the river Astara. The Baku to Tehran bus stops in Astara.
