= List of oil fields =

Some of the major oilfields of the past and present

Oil industry map showing oil pipelines, refineries, and petroleum fields.

Countries by Oil Production in 2013

This list of oil fields includes some major oil fields of the past and present.

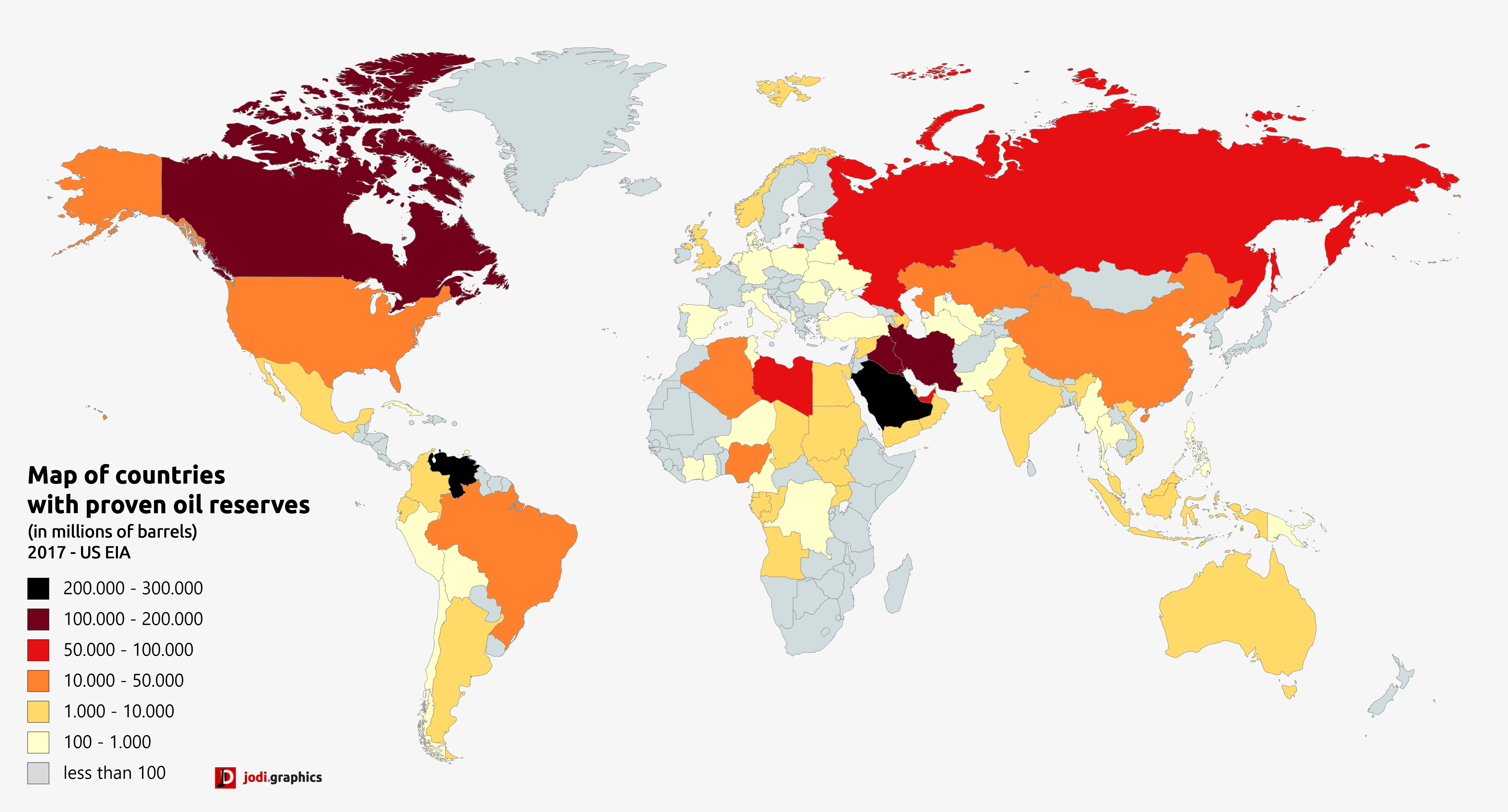
Countries by proven oil reserves 2017

The list is incomplete; there are more than 25,000 oil and gas fields of all sizes in the world. However, 94% of known oil is concentrated in fewer than 1,500 giant and major fields. Most of the world's largest oilfields are located in the Middle East, but there are also super giant (5 billion bbls) oilfields in Brazil, Mexico, Venezuela, Kazakhstan, and Russia.

A field containing 500 million barrels or more ultimately recoverable reserves is a giant field, while a super giant contains 5 billion barrels or more recoverable reserves.

Amounts listed below, in billions of barrels, are the estimated ultimate recoverable petroleum resources (proved reserves plus cumulative production also abbreviated as URR), given historical production and current extraction technology. Oil shale reserves (perhaps 3 trillion barrels (4.8×10^{11} m^{3})) and coal reserves, both of which can be converted to liquid petroleum, are not included in this chart. Other non-conventional liquid fuel sources are similarly excluded from this list.

Scientific assessments indicate the existence of substantial undiscovered, technically recoverable oil and natural gas resources in Arctic and other regions, but commercial exploration has either failed or not commenced due to unavailability of permits and approvals, restrictive policies, environmental risks and logistical challenges. The list excludes fields where commercial development has been unsuccessful and fields with no current plan for development and extraction.

Current production is for 2025, except when the year is specifically provided along with the production figure.

== Oil fields greater than 1 billion barrels (160 million cubic metres) URR ==
Field	Location	Discovered	Started production	Peaked	Recoverable oil, past and future (billion barrels)	Current Production (million barrels/day)	Status
Ghawar Field	Saudi Arabia	1948	1951	2005, disputed	88-104	3.8 (2019)	Production in managed decline phase with focus on maximizing long term extraction, unofficial estimates (from GlobalData) peg the production at 3.06 MBPD in 2023
Burgan Field	Kuwait	1937	1948	2005	66-72	1.7	Declining, rate of decline not publicly available
Bohai Field	China	1960s (Pilot Output) 2002 (Full Commercial Production)	1968		0.73-1	0.72 (2024)	Production is stable and gradually increasing, supported by continuous new developments
Ahvaz Field	Iran	1953	1954	1970s	25	0.75	Declining
Upper Zakum oil field	Abu Dhabi, UAE	1963	1982 (1967)		21	0.75	Extension planned to 1 MMb/d
Lower Zakum Field	United Arab Emirates	1963	1967		17.2	0.43	Expected to peak in 2028 at 0.45 MBPD
Gachsaran Field	Iran	1927	1930	1974	66	0.48	Declining
Cantarell Field	Mexico	1976	1981	2004	18–35	0.14	Declining, peaked in 2004 at 2.14 million barrels per day (340,000 m^{3}/d)
Ku-Maloob-Zaap	Mexico	1979	1981	2015	4.9	0.59	Declining, production peaked at 853,000 bpd in 2018
Bolivar Coastal Field	Venezuela	1917	1922		30–32	0.85	Production declined sharply in the 2010s and 2020s due to sanctions, under investment, and infrastructure degradation. Production stabilized by PDVSA and international partners
Aghajari Field	Iran	1938	1940		28	0.18	Declining
Tupi Field	Brazil, Santos Basin	2007	2009	2021	5–8	0.79	Declining
Roncador Field	Brazil, Campos Basin	1996	1999	2006	1.7	0.10	Declining
Ahdeb Oil Field	Iraq	1979	2011	2015	1	0.07	Declining
Safaniya Oil Field	Kuwait/Saudi Arabia	1951	1957	1981	30	1.2	Declining
Esfandiar Field	Iran	1969	2023		30	0.01	Increasing
Rumaila Field	Iraq	1953	1954	1979	17	1.4	Post peak, production stabilized with ongoing investments
Tengiz Field	Kazakhstan	1979	1993	2010	26–40	0.93	Peak production stage
Kirkuk Field	Iraq	1927	1934		8.5	0.29	Declining
Shaybah Field	Saudi Arabia	1998	1998		15	1.0	Peak production stage
Majnoon Field	Iraq	1975	2013		11–20	0.50	Production is stable, active plans and projects to increase production
Búzios oil field	Brazil	2010	2018		3	1.15 (2026)	Production expanding, target 2 mpbd
Samotlor Field	Russia, West Siberia	1965	1969	1980	14–16	0.33	Declining, 90% of reserves recovered 5% decline per year (2008–2014)
Shaikan Sheikh Adi Field	Iraqi Kurdistan	2009	2013		4–6	0.04	Production is stable with some fluctuation due to external incidents, but generally showing resilience and modest growth
Romashkino Field	Russia, Volga-Ural	1948	1949	1965	16–17	0.30 (2006)	Declining
Mero Oil field	Brazil, Santos Basin	2010	2022	2025	3.3	0.77	Peak production stage
Prudhoe Bay	United States, Alaska	1967–68	1977	1988	13	0.32 (2023)	Declining
Sarir Field	Libya	1961	1961		6.5	0.21	Declining
Priobskoye field	Russia, West Siberia	1982	2000		13	0.50 (2019)	Post peak, gradual managed tapering supported by advanced recovery methods and active drilling
Lyantorskoye field	Russia, West Siberia	1966	1979		13	0.17	Declining
Abqaiq Field	Saudi Arabia	1940	1940s	1973	12	0.43	Declining
Chicontepec Field	Mexico	1926			6.5 (19 certified)	0.07	Production is stable and has remained relatively low due to complex reservoir characteristics and high development costs, despite Pemex's ambitious target to attain 1 million bpd
Zuluf Field	Saudi Arabia	1965	1973		20	0.80	Increasing, planned capacity 1.4 million bpd
Berri Field	Saudi Arabia	1964	1970	1976	12	0.25	Post peak, production increased planned to 0.5 million bpd with additional investments
West Qurna Field	Iraq	1973	1976		33	1.0	Increasing, includes production from West Qurna 1 and West Qurna 2
Manifa Field	Saudi Arabia	1957	1964		11	0.90	Peak production stage
Khurais Field	Saudi Arabia	1957	2009		25	1.5	Peak production stage
Fyodorovskoye Field	Russia, West Siberia	1971	1974		11	0.69	Declining
East Baghdad Field	Iraq	1976			8	0.05	Production is stable, active plans to increase production
Foroozan-Marjan (Iran) Field	Saudi Arabia/Iran	1966	1975	1987	10	0.51	Declining, the Iranian side (Foroozan) procuces 0.04 MBPD, the Saudi side (Marjan) was estimated to produce 0.47 MBPD in 2023 by GlobalData
Marlim Field	Brazil, Campos Basin	1985		2002	10–14	0.01	Declining
Awali	Bahrain	1932	1932	1971	2.1	0.04	Declining
Azadegan Field	Iran	1999	2003		5.2	0.19	Increasing
Marun Field	Iran	1963	1966	1976	16	0.52	Declining
Minagish	Kuwait	1959			2		
Raudhatain	Kuwait	1955	1959	1960s-1970s	11	0.35	Declining
Sabriya	Kuwait	1955	2018		3.8–4		
Yibal	Oman	1962	1968	1997	1	0.02	Declining
Mukhaizna Oil Field	Oman	1975	2000	2016	1	0.08	Declining
Dukhan Field	Qatar	1939	1988	2007	2.2	0.34	Declining
Halfaya Field	Iraq	1976	2012	2025 (expected)	4.1	0.37 (2019)	Plateau production target of 400,000 bpd
Az Zubayr Field	Iraq	1949	1951	2019	6	0.40 (2023)	Production enhancement project by an Eni-led consortium began in 2010 to expand production to 1.2 million bpd, production fluctuated in the range of 300,000 to 400,000 bpd in 2023 - 2024
Nahr Umr Field	Iraq	1948			6	0.05	Production has fluctuated over its history, recent efforts ongoing to expand capacity. Agreement with Haliburton aims to increase capacity to 300,000 bpd
Abu-Sa'fah field	Saudi Arabia	1963	1966	2004	6.1	0.30	
Hassi Messaoud	Algeria	1956	1958	1977	6.4-8	0.35	Declining, peak production occurred in 1977 at about 717,000 bpd, though most references cite a plateau era of 500,000 bpd during the 1970s
Bouri Field	Libya	1976	1988	1995	4.5	0.06	Post peak, production stabilized with ongoing investments
Kizomba Complex	Angola				2		
Dalia (oil field)	Angola	1997	2006	2010	1	0.20	Post peak, production stabilized with ongoing investments
Belayim	Angola				>1		
Zelten oil field	Libya	1959	1961	1979	2.5	0.002	Accumulated production reached 2.426 billion barrels by 2006; initial estimates in 1959 suggested 2.5 billion barrels of reserves
Agbami Field	Nigeria	1998	2008	2009	0.8–1.2	0.09 (2019)	Declining
Bonga Field	Nigeria	1996	2005	2006	1.4	0.13	Declining
Azeri-Chirag-Guneshli	Azerbaijan	1985	1997	2010	5.4	0.33	Post peak, production stabilized with ongoing investments
Bahar oilfield	Azerbaijan, Bibiheybət	1846					
Karachaganak Field	Kazakhstan	1979	1984		2.4	0.26	Production reached around 100,000 bpd of oil and condensate before declining in the early 1990s, followed by redevelopment and expansions in the 2000s
Kashagan Field	Kazakhstan	2000	2016		30	0.40	Increasing
Darkhan Field	Kazakhstan				9.5		
Zhanazhol Field	Kazakhstan	1978	1987		3	0.02	Primarily a gas condensate field, the cumulative production of oil and condensate reached 652.65 million barrels by the end of 2020
Uzen Field	Kazakhstan	1962	1965	1982	12.6	0.10	Declining
Kalamkas Field	Kazakhstan				3.2		
Zhetybay Field	Kazakhstan				2.1		
Nursultan Field	Kazakhstan				4.5		
Jubilee oil field	Ghana	2007	2010		3	0.15	Declining
Ekofisk oil field	Norway	1969	1971	2006	3.3	0.13	Declining
Troll Vest	Norway	1979	1990	2003	1.4	0.03	Declining
Statfjord	Norway	1974	1979	1987	5	0.01	Declining
Gullfaks	Norway	1978	1986	1994	2.1	0.02	Declining
Oseberg	Norway	1979	1988		2.2	0.09	Declining
Snorre	Norway	1979	1992	2003	1.5	0.09	Declining
Johan Sverdrup oil field	Norway	2010	2019	2023	2.8	0.66 (2026)	Declining from 2025, 2026 decline expected to be 15% from 2025 levels
Mamontovskoye Field	Russia				8		
Russkoye Field	Russia				2.5		
Kamennoe Field	Russia				1.9		
Vankor Field	Russia	1983	2009		3.8		
Vatyeganskoye Field	Russia				1.4		
Tevlinsko-Russkinskoye Field	Russia				1.3		
Sutorminskoye Field	Russia				1.3		
Urengoy group	Russia				1		
Ust-Balykskoe Field	Russia				>1		
Tuymazinskoe Field	Russia				3		
Arlanskoye Field	Russia				>2		
South-Hilchuy Field	Russia				3.1		
North-Dolginskoye Field	Russia				2.2		
Nizhne-Chutinskoe Field	Russia				1.7		
South-Dolginskoye Field	Russia				1.6		
Prirazlomnoye Field	Russia	1989	2011		1.4		
West-Matveevskoye Field	Russia				1.1		
Sakhalin Islands	Russia				14		
Odoptu	Russia				1		
Arukutun-Dagi	Russia				1		
Piltun-Astokhskoye Field	Russia	1986	1999		1		
Ayash Field East-Odoptu Field	Russia				4.5		
Verhne-Chonskoye Field	Russia				1.3		
Talakan Field	Russia				1.3		
North-Caucasus Basin	Russia				1.7		
Vaca Muerta	Argentina, Patagonia	2010	2010		16	0.59	Increasing, expected to peak at 1.3 MBPD in early 2030s
Clair oilfield	United Kingdom	1977			1		Declining
Forties oilfield	United Kingdom	1970	1975	1979	5	0.01	Declining
Jupiter field	Brazil	2008			1.6		Production expected to start in 2028
Cupiagua/Cusiana	Colombia				1		
Boscán Field, Venezuela	Venezuela	1946	1947	1990s	1.6	0.05-0.1	Declining
Mumbai High Field	India, Arabian Sea	1965	1974	1989	2.4	0.13 (2026)	Declining
Pembina	Canada	1953	1953	1950 s or some months later.	1.81		Declining, production peaked at 0.1 M BPD in 1950s, field is still producing at much smaller quanrity
Swan Hills	Canada	1957	Late 1950s	1960s-1970s	1	0.01	Declining
Rainbow Lake	Canada	1956	1950s		1.5	0.002	Declining, tail end of production
Hibernia	Canada	1979	1997	2004	3	0.07	Declining, 85% of reserves recovered
Terra Nova Field	Canada	1984	2002	2000 s (shortly after start)	1.0	0.18	Post peak, production stabilized investments
Kelly-Snyder	United States, Texas	1948	1948	1951	1.5	0.02	Declining
Bakken Formation	United States, North Dakota	1951	2005	2019	7.3	1.3	Declining
Permian Formation	United States, Texas	1921	2005	2006	55-105.7	6.6	Increasing, rate of increase slowing down, expected to peak in 2026
Eagle Ford Formation	United States, Texas	2008	2008	2015	3.8	1.0	Declining
Yates Oil Field	United States, Texas	1926	1926	1929	3.0 (2.0 billion recovered; 1.0 reserve remaining)	0.01	Declining
Kuparuk oil field	United States, Alaska	1969	1981	1992	1-1.5	0.06	Post peak, production stabilized using new investments
Alpine, Alaska	United States, Alaska	1994	2000	2005	0.4–1	0.01	Post peak, production is currently stable and showing a modest increasing trend due to active development of satellite fields and ongoing drilling
East Texas Oil Field	United States, Texas	1930			6		
Spraberry Trend	United States, Texas	1943			10		
Wilmington Oil Field	United States, California	1932			3		
South Belridge Oil Field	United States, California	1911			2		
Coalinga Oil Field	United States, California	1887			1		
Elk Hills	United States, California	1911			1.5		
Kern River	United States, California	1899	1899	1904	2	0.002	Declining
Midway-Sunset Field	United States, California	1894			3.4		
Thunder Horse Oil Field	United States, Gulf of Mexico	1999	2007	2009	1	0.20	Post peak, production stabilized with ongoing investments
Kingfish	Australia	1967	1971	1980s	1.2	0.00 (2026)	Production ended early 2026, the field produced over one billion barrels of oil over its lifetime.
Halibut	Australia	1967	1970	1971	1	0.00	Production ceased in 2024. Removal of platforms planned in 2026-2027
Daqing Field	China	1959	1960	2003	16	0.60 (2021)	Post peak, production stabilized using advanced recovery methods and new investments
Tahe Field	China				8		
Jidong Nanpu Oil Field	China	2005	2006		7.35		
SL10-SL13 Genel/CPC Field	Somaliland	2014			4.2		
Wushi Oil Field	China	2005	2016				
Tarim Oil Fields	China	early 1980s	1984	2024	7.3	0.40	Peak Production
Zafiro Field	Equatorial Guinea	1995	1996	2005	1	0.1 (2020)	Production has significantly declined from the peak of 380 KPBD in 2005 to below 100 KPBD

== See also ==
- Athabasca Oil Sands
- Brent oilfield — decommissioned oil field in the North Sea
- Giant oil and gas fields
- List of coalfields
- List of natural gas fields
- List of oil and gas fields of the North Sea
- OAPEC
- Oil megaprojects
- Oil shale reserves
- OPEC
- Petrol
- Petroleum Reservoir
