= Energy in Venezuela =

Energy in Venezuela is dominated by fossil fuels, particularly oil and natural gas, while hydropower plays a major role in the production of electricity, with smaller contributions from renewable sources such as bio waste. Venezuela was one of the world's largest producers of oil, and the country with the largest proven oil reserves in the world.Venezuela is a member of OPEC.

== Overview ==
Energy in Venezuela
	Capita	Prim. energy	Production	Export	Electricity	CO_{2}-emission
	Million	TWh	TWh	TWh	TWh	Mt
2004	26.1	653	2,280	1,623	72.1	128
2007	27.5	741	2,138	1,381	84.6	144
2008	27.9	745	2,102	1,340	85.9	146
2009	28.4	778	2,367	1,503	89.5	155
2010	28.83	895	2,241	1,353	94.77	183.04
2012	29.28	816	2,335	1,506	97.73	159.22
2012R	29.96	888	2,318	1,405	101.88	178.28
2013	30.41	800	2,235	1,405	98.25	155.57
Change 2004-10	10.3%	37.0%	-1,7%	-16,6%	31.4%	42.6%
Mtoe = 11.63 TWh, Prim. energy includes energy losses 2012R = CO2 calculation criteria changed, numbers updated

== Oil ==
In 1878, a group of Venezuelan entrepreneurs founded the first oil company in Venezuela. Venezuela ranked 11th in the world for oil production in 2016; production has since fallen steeply. The largest oil company is Petróleos de Venezuela (PDVSA). Oil fields in the country include Bolivar Coastal Field, Boscán Field, Maracaibo Basin and Orinoco Belt.

Oil production 2011-2021 (kb/d)
2011	2012	2013	2014	2015	2016	2017	2018	2019	2020	2021
2755	2704	2680	2692	2864	2566	2220	1631	1022	640	654

In 2023, Venezuela held the world's largest proven oil reserves at 303 billion barrels, accounting for 17% of global reserves, mostly extra-heavy crude from the Orinoco Belt. Despite this, production was only 0.8% of the global total, dropping to 742,000 barrels per day, a 70% decline from 2013. Production rose by 13% in 2021 and 18% in 2022 with help from Iran, China, and Chevron after some sanctions were eased. PDVSA, the state oil company, faces issues like heavy government levies, underinvestment, mismanagement, and a lack of skilled personnel, reducing reinvestment and production. Venezuela's oil exports reached their peak in 1998 and have been in decline since. Refineries operate below capacity due to maintenance issues and lack of feedstock. Venezuela relies on fuel imports from Iran and China due to domestic shortages. A territorial dispute with Guyana over the Essequibo region heightened tensions, but both countries agreed to seek a diplomatic resolution.

Venezuela is expected to run out of crude oil in 390 years, making it one of the countries that will be able to continue producing it after other countries run out of their oil resources. In Venezuela, fossil fuels account fr more than 80% of total energy consumption.

== Natural gas ==
In 2023, Venezuela held 195 trillion cubic feet (Tcf) of natural gas reserves, making up 73% of South America's total. Most of this gas is associated with crude oil, with 80% produced as a by-product. Despite these vast reserves, much of Venezuela's natural gas is underutilized, used to support mature oil fields or flared due to inadequate infrastructure. Production peaked at 1.12 Tcf in 2001 but fell to 563 billion cubic feet (Bcf) by 2021, hampered by poor investment and lack of infrastructure. Domestic consumption peaked at 936 Bcf in 2015 but dropped to 563 Bcf by 2021 due to economic decline. Venezuela is a major gas flarer, with flaring increasing fourfold from 2012 to 2021, reaching 706 Bcf in 2022. Government-regulated prices and subsidies keep natural gas prices below market rates, further limiting investment in the sector.

Natural gas production 2011-2021 (billion cubic metres)
2011	2012	2013	2014	2015	2016	2017	2018	2019	2020	2021
30.2	31.9	30.6	31.8	36.1	37.2	38.6	31.6	25.6	21.6	24.0

== Coal ==
In 2021, Venezuela held South America's fourth-largest coal reserves, totaling 806 million short tons. The main coalfields are in Zulia State, near the Colombian border. Coal plays a minor role in Venezuela's energy mix, contributing 0.2% to total energy production and 0.1% to consumption. The coal industry faces challenges such as outdated infrastructure and limited investment, leading to a production decline of 16% annually from 2001 to 2021, after peaking at nearly 8.7 million short tons in 2000. By 2021, production was 174 thousand short tons, entirely bituminous coal. Most of Venezuela's coal is used domestically in industrial processes. Consumption peaked at 319,000 short tons in 2012 but dropped to 67,000 short tons by 2021 due to economic decline.

Coal production 2011-2021 (exajoules)
2011	2012	2013	2014	2015	2016	2017	2018	2019	2020	2021
0.08	0.06	0.04	0.02	0.02	0.02	0.02	0.02	0.01	0.01	<0.005

== Electricity ==
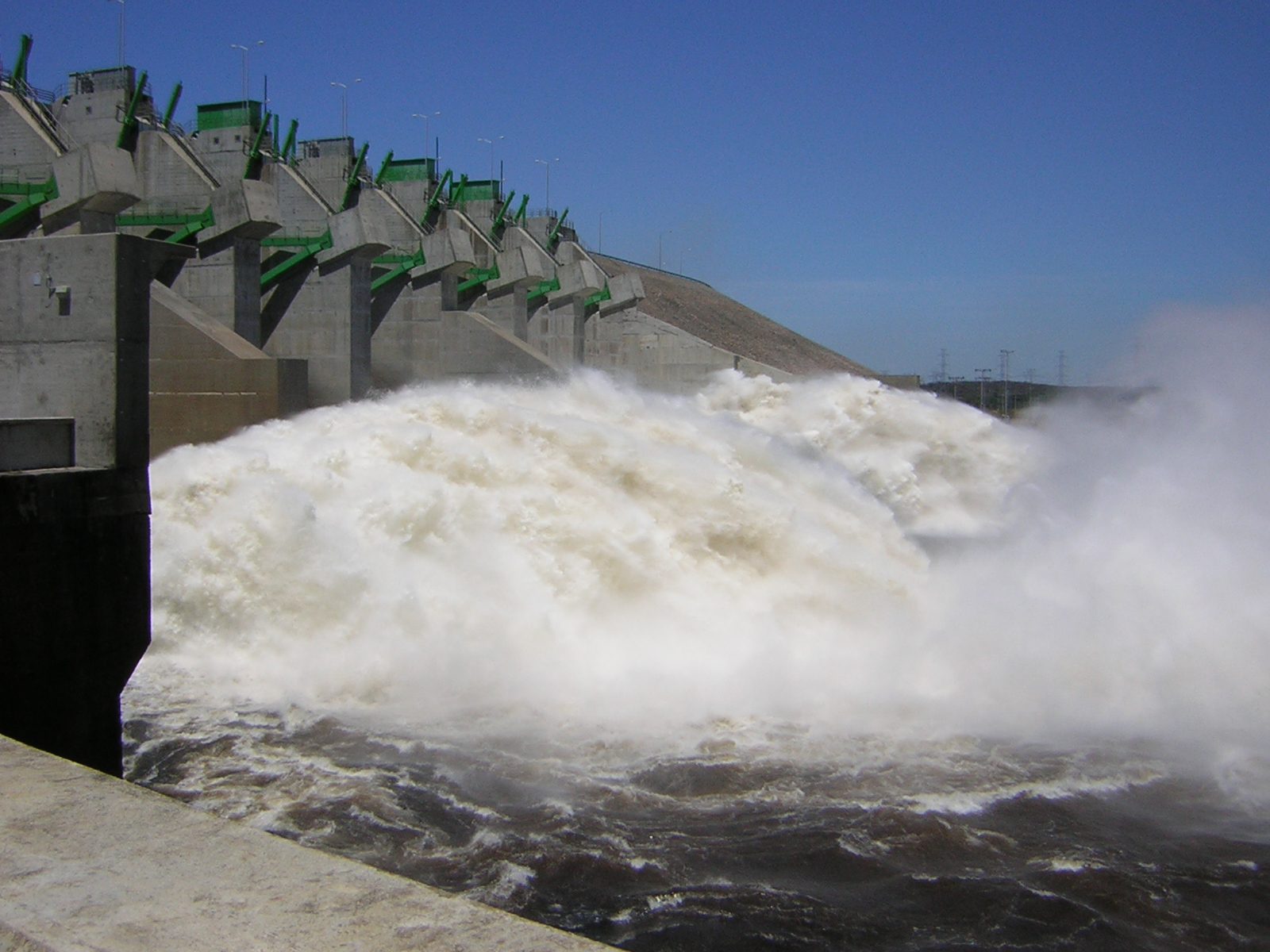
Caruachi Dam, Caroní River in Bolivar state, Venezuela (2006) 12 TWh/year

=== Hydroelectricity ===
Hydro power provided 90% of domestic electricity in 2023. Venezuela produced 87 TWh hydro power in 2008, 2.6% of the world's total. Venezuela was 8th in hydro electricity in 2008. Venezuela's commitment to hydroelectricity was introduced in 1946 through the National Electrification plan and was approved by government officials in 1956. Almost half of Venezuela's hydroelectricy comes from the Guri dam, which has a capacity of more than 10GW.

== Renewable energy ==
Venezuela increased their renewable energy consumption to 30.13% in 2020, which added to the country's total energy consumption. Biofuels and waste in Venezuela make up about 1.9% of renewable energy.

== See also ==
- List of renewable energy topics by country
- Nuclear energy in Venezuela
