= Marun Field =

Oil field in Iran

Marun
- Location of the Marun oil field within Iran
- Country: Iran
- Region: Asia
- Offshore/onshore: Onshore
- Coordinates: 30°51′13″N 49°50′19″E
- Operators: NISOC
- Partners: NIOC

Field history
- Discovery: 1963
- Start of production: 1966

Production
- Current production of oil: 520,000 barrels per day (~2.6×10^{7} t/a)
- Estimated oil in place: 46,700 million barrels (~6.37×10^{9} t)
- Recoverable oil: 21,900 million barrels (~2.99×10^{9} t)
- Estimated gas in place: 462,100×10^{9} cu ft (13,090×10^{9} m^{3})
- Producing formations: Miocene; Cretaceous; Jurassic

Marun Field is an oil field in the Khuzestan province of Iran and is the second-largest oil field in Iran. The field was discovered in 1963, and owned by state-owned National Iranian Oil Company (NIOC) and operated by National Iranian South Oil Company (NISOC).

The Marun field contains estimated recoverable oil reserves of 22 billion barrels making it the world's sixth biggest onshore oil field in the world. Marun is currently producing approximately 520,000 barrels per day (83,000 m^{3}/d) of crude oil per day. It is the second biggest producing oil field in Iran, after Ahvaz Field.

The super-giant Marun field, has long been one of the most prolific oil fields in Iran. It reached a peak of 1.34 million b/d in 1976, and although it has since declined, it remains in the top three producing fields alongside Ahvaz Field and Gachsaran Field. The smaller Kupal oil field and Shadegan oil field, located north and south of Marun. The Marun field was brought on stream in 1966 and its production gradually raised to more than one million barrels of oil a day in 1972. It consists of two oil reservoirs and one gas reservoir named Asmari, Bangestan, and Khami, respectively.

== See also ==
- List of oil fields
