= Giant oil and gas fields =

Fields with over 500 million barrels of recoverable oil or gas equivalent

The world's 932 giant oil and gas fields are considered those with 500 million barrels (79,000,000 m^{3}) of ultimately recoverable oil or gas equivalent. Geoscientists believe these giants account for 40 percent of the world's petroleum reserves. They are clustered in 27 regions of the world, with the largest clusters in the Persian Gulf and Western Siberian basin. The past three decades reflect declines in discoveries of giant fields. The years 2000–11 reflect an upturn in discoveries and may soon be the third best decade for discovery of giant oil and gas fields in the 150-year history of modern oil and gas exploration.

Recent work in tracking giant oil and gas fields follows the earlier efforts of the late exploration geologist Michel T. Halbouty, who tracked trends in giant discoveries from the 1960s to 2004.

== Tectonic settings ==
Geophysicists and exploration geologists who look for oil and gas fields classify the subsurface characteristics, or tectonic setting, of geological structures that contain hydrocarbons. Any one oil and gas field may reflect influences from multiple geological periods and events, but geoscientists often attempt to characterize a field based on the dominant geological event that influenced the structure's ability to trap and contain oil and gas in recoverable quantities.

A majority of the world's giant oil and gas fields exist in two characteristic tectonic settings—passive margin and rift environments. Passive margins are found along the edges of major ocean basins, such as the Atlantic coast of Brazil where oil and gas has been located in large quantities in the Campos basin. Rifts are oceanic ridges formed when tectonic plates separate and a new crust is created. The North Sea is an example of a rift setting associated with prodigious hydrocarbon reserves. Geoscientists theorize that both zones are especially conducive to forming giant oil and gas fields when they are distant from active tectonic areas. Stability appears to be conducive to trapping and retaining hydrocarbons under the subsurface.

Four other common tectonic settings, including collisional margins, strike-slip margins, and subduction margins, are associated with the formation of giant oil and gas fields, though not to the dominant extent of passive margin and rift settings.

== Recent and future giants ==
Based on the locations of past giants, Mann et al. predicted new discoveries of giant oil and gas fields would mainly be made in passive margin and rift environments, especially in deepwater basins. They also predicted that existing areas that have produced giant fields would be likely targets for new discoveries of "elephants", as the fields are sometimes known in the oil and gas industry.

Data from 2000–07 reflect the accuracy of their predictions. The 79 new giant oil and gas fields discovered from 2000–07 tended to be located in similar tectonic settings as the previously documented giants from 1868–2000, with 36 percent along passive margins, 30 percent in rift zones or overlying sags (structures associated with rifts), and 20 percent in collisional zones.

Despite a recent uptick in the number of giant oil and gas fields, discovery of giants appears to have peaked in the 1960s and 1970s. Looking to the future, geoscientists foresee a continuation of the recent trend of discovering more giant gas fields than oil fields. Two major continental regions—Antarctica and the Arctic—remain largely unexplored. Beyond them, however, trends suggest that remaining giant fields will be discovered in "in-fill" areas where past giants have been clustered and in frontier, or new, areas that correspond to the predominant tectonic settings of past giants.

== Giant field production properties and behaviour ==
Comprehensive analysis of the production from the majority of the world's giant oil fields has shown their enormous importance for global oil production. For instance, the 20 largest oil fields in the world alone account for roughly 25% of the total oil production.

Further analysis shows that giant oil fields typically reach their maximum production before 50% of the ultimate recoverable volume has been extracted. A strong correlation between depletion and the rate of decline was also found in that study, indicating that much new technology has only been able to temporarily decrease depletion at the expense of rapid future decline. This is exactly the case in the Cantarell Field.

== See also ==
- Hydrocarbon exploration
- List of countries by proven oil reserves
- List of natural gas fields
- List of oil fields
- Oil megaprojects
- Peak oil
