= Energy in South America =

Energy use, import and production in South America is described in the following articles:

- Energy in Argentina
- Energy in Brazil
- Energy in Chile
- Energy in Colombia
- Energy in Peru
- Energy in Uruguay
- Energy in Venezuela
- Energy law
- Energy policy
