= Tyumen Oblast =

First-level administrative division of Russia

Tyumen Oblast Тюменская область (Russian)
- Oblast
- Flag Coat of arms

- Tyumen Oblast, including the Khanty-Mansi Autonomous Okrug (center, pink) and Yamalo-Nenets Autonomous Okrug (top, pink)
- Coordinates: 57°50′N 69°00′E
- Country: Russia
- Federal district: Ural
- Economic region: West Siberia
- Established: August 14, 1944
- Administrative center: Tyumen

Government
  - Body: Oblast Duma
  - Governor: Aleksandr Moor

Area
  - Total: 160,122 km^{2} (61,823 sq mi)

Population (2021 census)
  - Total: 3,823,910
  - Estimate (2018): 3,692,400
  - Rank: 28th
  - Density: 23.8812/km^{2} (61.8521/sq mi)
  - Urban: 80.8%
  - Rural: 19.2%

GDP (nominal, 2024)
  - Total: ₽18.48 trillion (US$216.89 billion)
  - Per capita: ₽4.73 million (US$55,452.69)
- Time zone: UTC+5 (MSK+2)
- ISO 3166 code: RU-TYU
- License plates: 72
- OKTMO ID: 71000000
- Official languages: Russian
- Website: admtyumen.ru

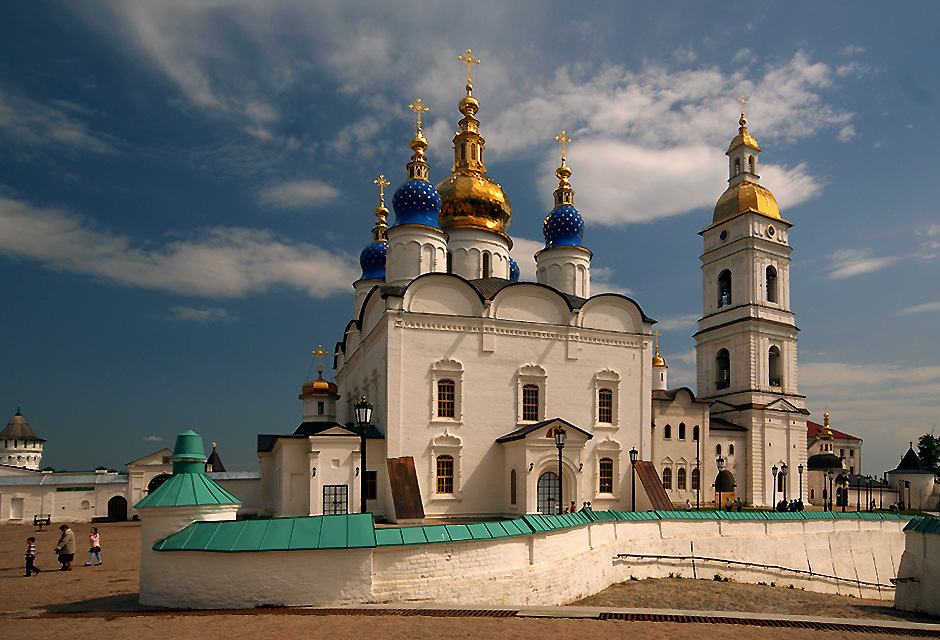
Tobolsk Kremlin

Tyumen Oblast (Note: Russian: Тюме́нская о́бласть, romanized: Tyumenskaya oblastʹ) is a federal subject (an oblast) of Russia. It is located in Western Siberia, and is administratively part of the Ural Federal District. The oblast has administrative jurisdiction over two autonomous okrugs: the Khanty-Mansi and Yamalo-Nenets Autonomous Okrug. The oblast, including its autonomous okrugs, is the third-largest federal subject by area, and has a population of 3,395,755 (2010).

Tyumen is the largest city and the administrative center of the oblast, and the fourth-largest Russian city in Siberia.

Tyumen Oblast is the largest producer of oil and natural gas in the country, and has experienced an oil boom since the early 2000s. The rapid growth of the fuel industry has made the oblast by far the richest federal subject of Russia, with an average GDP per capita several times the national average since 2006.

== Geography ==
The territory covers 160,100 km^{2}. The Tyumen Oblast was founded on August 14, 1944. It includes two autonomous okrugs of the Khanty-Mansi Autonomous Okrug (which is the okrug that borders the region) and Yamalo-Nenets Autonomous Okrug (Yamalia). The territory is located in the basin of the river. The biggest rivers are the Tura, Tobol, Pyshma, Iset, Tavda, Ishim, Agan, Irtysh, Tanama, and Noska. The hydro-geographical system is characterized with the prevalence of small rivers as well as the significant bogginess of their catchment areas and numerous lakes. It borders Khanty-Mansi Autonomous Okrug in the north, Omsk Oblast and Tomsk Oblast in the East, Kazakhstan (North Kazakhstan Region), Kurgan Oblast and Sverdlovsk Oblast in the west.

=== Climate ===
Extreme climatic conditions characterise most parts of the territory, especially the Yamalo-Nenets Autonomous Okrug, Beloyarsky and Berezovsky areas of the Khanty-Mansiysk Autonomous Okrug Yugra within the Far North and other areas and urban districts of the Khanty-Mansi Autonomous Okrug and Uvat area equated to them.

The climate is arctic, subarctic and humid continental in the north, center and south, respectively. The average January temperature ranges from −17 °C or 1.4 °F in Tyumen Oblast to −27 °C or −16.6 °F in the north. The duration of the period affected by frost ranges from 130 days per year in Tyumen to 210 or more in the tundra region.

=== Hydrology ===
The region contains more than 70,000 watercourses with a length of more than 10 km for a total length of 584,400 km. The largest navigable rivers are the Ob (185 cu km / yr) and Irtysh (36.5 cu km / yr). In the region there are about 70 thousand lakes. In the north and central parts are widespread Alas lakes and predominately marsh in the south.

=== Ecology ===
The Red Book of Tyumen Oblast listed 711 rare and endangered species. In the list of specially protected areas of the south region there are 99 sites, including one international and three federal.

=== Time zone ===
Tyumen Oblast is in the Yekaterinburg time zone (UTC+5; MSK+2).

=== Fauna and flora ===
There are variety of fauna and flora in this oblast. In the northern part can be found ptarmigan, walrus and Arctic fox. Polar bears also occur in the extreme north; the genetic make-up of this Polar bear sub-population is genetically distinct from other circumpolar regions.

== Politics ==
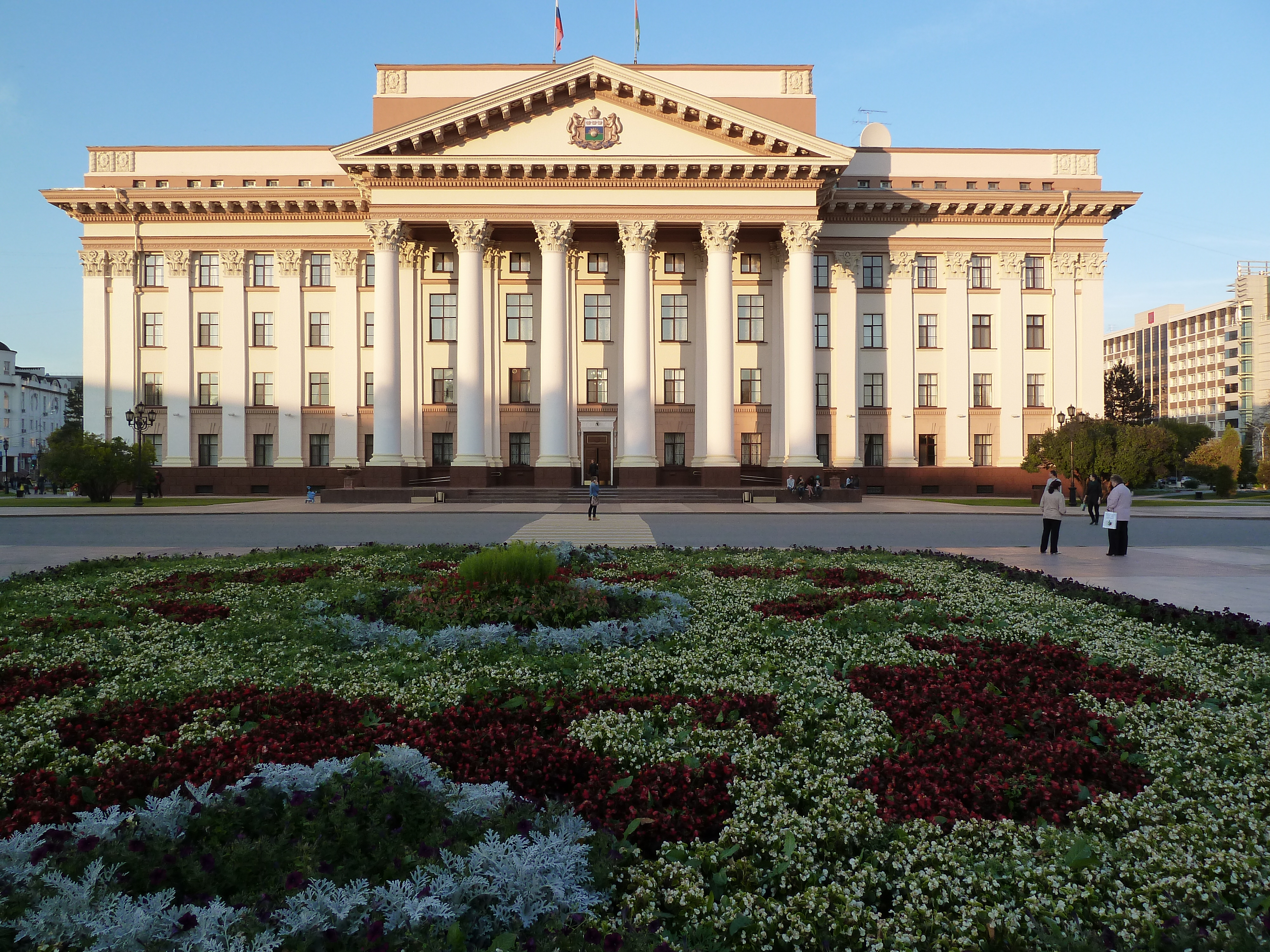
Tyumen Oblast Administration building

During the Soviet period, the high authority in the oblast was shared between three persons: The first secretary of the Tyumen CPSU Committee (who in reality had the biggest authority), the chairman of the oblast Soviet (legislative power), and the Chairman of the oblast Executive Committee (executive power). Since 1991, CPSU lost all the power, and the head of the Oblast administration, and eventually the governor was appointed/elected alongside elected regional parliament.

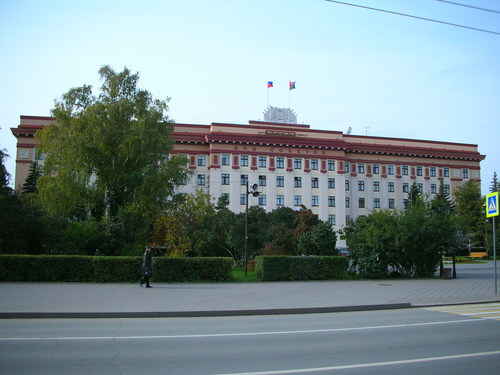
Tyumen Oblast Duma

The politics in the oblast is governed by the Charter of Tyumen Oblast. The laws within the authority of the oblast are passed by the Legislative Assembly of Tymen Oblast which is the legislative (representative) body. The highest executive body is the Tyumen Oblast Administration. It also includes the executive bodies of the subdivisions such as districts, and is responsible for the daily administration. The Oblast administration supports the activities of the Governor who is the head of the oblast and acts as guarantor of the observance of the Charter in accordance with the Constitution of Russia.

== Natural resources ==
The autonomous regions are concentrated the bulk of the country's oil and gas. The total volume of exploration drilling has exceeded 45 million meters. Oil production is concentrated in the Middle Ob. Gas is produced mainly in the northern areas. Large oil fields are located in the Khanty-Ugra: Samotlor Field, Ob, Fyodorovskoye Field, Mamontovskoye, Krasnoleninskoye; gas - in the Yamalo-Nenets District: Urengoy Field, Bear, Yamburg Field. The depth from 700 m to 4 km. Produced peat, sapropel, quartz sand, limestone. Explored about 400 deposits of raw materials for the production of building materials [source not specified 252 days].

Ore minerals and precious stones discovered on the eastern slope of the Subpolar and Polar Urals (in particular, the deposits of Lead, copper, chromite).

The area is rich in fresh water resources, which are represented by large rivers - the Ob, Irtysh, Tobol, lakes (650 ths.) - Black (224 km^{2}), Big Uvat (179 km^{2}), etc., groundwater, that contain more than half of Russian stocks. iodine (30 mlg / l) and bromine (40-50 mlg / l)

Over 44% of the land reserves in the south of the region are covered with forests. 43 million hectares are covered by forests. The forest resources area is the third largest in the Russian Federation after the Krasnoyarsk Territory and the Irkutsk Region. The main forest forming species are pine, birch, spruce, fir, aspen and larch. The total timber reserves are estimated at 5.4 billion cubic meters.

In the south of the Tyumen region are about ten hot (37-50 °C) geothermal sources, having balneological properties. Sources are popular not only among residents of Tyumen, but in neighboring regions as well: the Sverdlovsk, Kurgan, and Chelyabinsk regions.

The region has large peat reserves. Large deposits of vivianite (ferric phosphate) (approximately 20% of world reserves) have been discovered in particular peat deposits, the usage of which may meet the phosphate fertilizers demand of the agriculture.

There are deposits of quartz sands, brick and expanded clays, sapropels and limestone. The region has large fresh and mineral water reserves. There are great prospects for oil field development.

== Economy ==
As of 2016, the Nominal GDP in Tyumen Oblast(including Khanty–Mansi and Yamalo-Nenets Autonomous regions) reached ₽5,9 trillion$104 billion ($28,000 per capita).

Tyumen is a service center for gas and oil industries: the Oblast has the highest level of oil and gas production of any region in Russia. Gazprom, LUKoil and Gazpromneft, TNK-BP, Shell, Salym Petroleum Development N.V. have representative offices in Tyumen. It has been suggested that the importance of these industries has caused the high levels of economic inequality observed in the region.

The largest companies in the region include Sibur (revenues of $6.41 billion in 2017), the Antipinsky Refinery ($3.19 billion) and the local branch of Schlumberger ($365.08 million).

== Agriculture ==
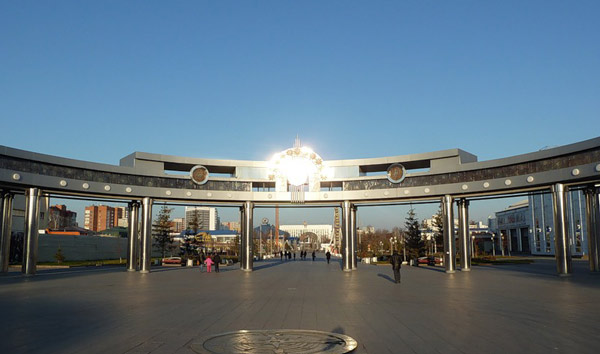
The center park of the city

The Tyumen region produces milk, meat, eggs, potatoes and vegetables.

== Transport infrastructure ==
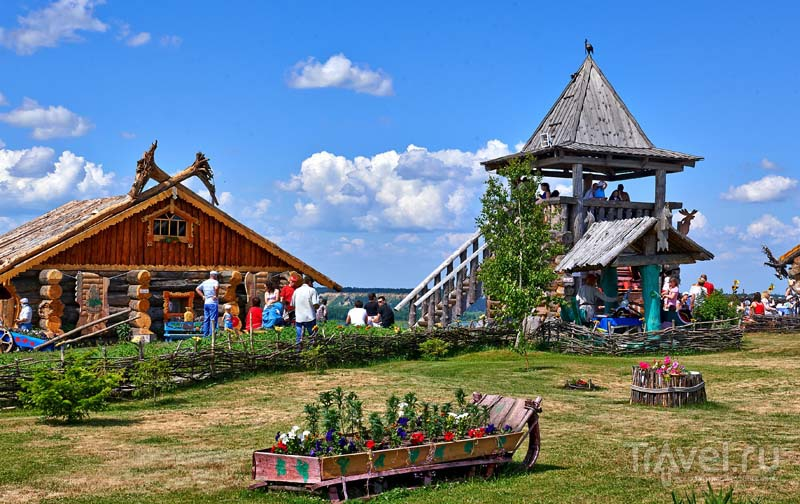
Abalakskoe pole

Transport is presented by the motor, railway, aviation and river communication system. The railway takes the leading position in freight traffic.

The river port is also a cargo center and a link between rail, road and air transport.

Roshchino International Airport is undergoing construction as of 2017, with development of a new terminal.

== Demographics ==
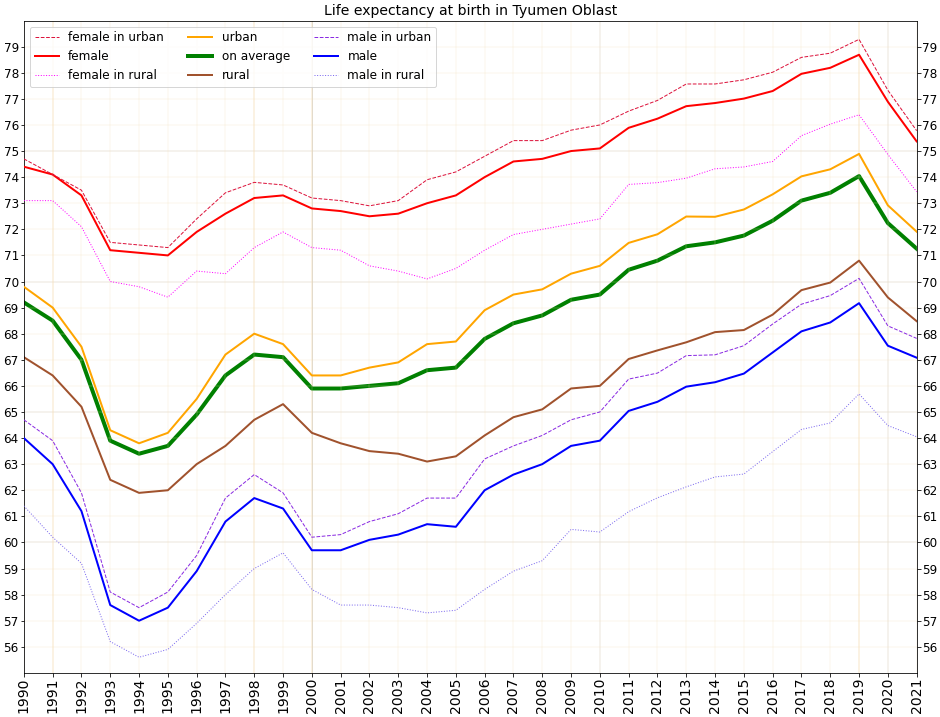
Life expectancy at birth in Tyumen Oblast

Historical population
Year	Pop.	±%
1959	1,092,126	—
1970	1,406,101	+28.7%
1979	1,887,152	+34.2%
1989	3,080,621	+63.2%
2002	3,264,841	+6.0%
2010	3,395,755	+4.0%
2021	3,823,910	+12.6%
Source: Census data

Population: 3,395,755 (2010 census); 3,264,841 (2002 census); 3,080,621 (1989 Soviet census).

Ethnic groups: There were thirty-six recognized ethnic groups of more than two thousand persons each in Tyumen Oblast, making this one of the most multicultural oblasts in Russia. The national composition at the time of the 2010 Census was:

- Russians: 73.3%
- Volga-Ural-Siberian Tatars: 7.5%
- Ukrainians: 4.9%
- Bashkirs: 1.4%
- Azerbaijanis: 1.4%
- Nenets: 1%
- Chuvash: 0.93%
- Khanty: 0.9%
- Belarusians: 0.8%
- Germans: 0.6%
- Kazakhs: 0.6%
- Moldovans: 0.5%
- Armenians: 0.5%
- Mansi: 0.4%
- 5.3% others
- 187,803 people were registered from administrative databases, and could not declare an ethnicity. It is estimated that the proportion of ethnicities in this group is the same as that of the declared group.

Vital statistics for 2024:

- Births: 16,973 (10.5 per 1,000)
- Deaths: 17,166 (10.6 per 1,000)

Total fertility rate (2024): 1.76 children per woman

Life expectancy (2021): Total — 70.14 years (male — 65.43, female — 74.88)

=== Religion ===
According to a 2012 official survey 28.9% of the population of Tyumen Oblast adheres to the Russian Orthodox Church, 9% is an Orthodox Christian believer without belonging to any church or is a member of other (non-Russian) Eastern Orthodox Churches, 4% are unaffiliated generic Christians, 1% are members of Protestant churches. 6% of the population is composed of Muslims, 2% are adherents of the Slavic native faith (Rodnovery), and 0.4% to forms of Hinduism (Vedism, Krishnaism or Tantrism). In addition, 34% of the population declares to be "spiritual but not religious", 11% is atheist, and 3.7% follows other religions or did not give an answer to the question.

Religion in Tyumen Oblast as of 2012 (Sreda Arena Atlas)
Russian Orthodoxy	28.9%
Other Orthodox	9.2%
Protestantism	0.9%
Other Christians	4.3%
Islam	5.7%
Rodnovery and other native faiths	1.6%
Spiritual but not religious	34%
Atheism and irreligion	11%
Other and undeclared	4.4%

== Honours ==
2120 Tyumenia, a minor planet discovered in 1967 by Soviet astronomer Tamara Mikhailovna Smirnova is named after the Tyumen Oblast.

== See also ==
- 2007 Siberian orange snow
