= Kupal oil field =

Iranian oil field

- Country: Iran
- Region: Khuzestan Province
- Offshore/onshore: Onshore
- Operators: NISOC
- Partners: NIOC

Field history
- Discovery: 1965
- Start of production: 1970

Production
- Current production of oil: 93,000 barrels per day (~4.6×10^{6} t/a)
- Estimated oil in place: 5,600 million barrels (~7.6×10^{8} t)

The Kupal oil field is an oil field located in Khuzestan Province, at 60 km east of Ahvaz City. It was discovered in 1965 and the production was started after installing production facilities in 1970. The total proven reserves of the Kupal oil field are around 5,6 billion barrels. The field has 60 km in length 1.5 km in width and includes two Asmari and Bangestan reservoirs. So far, 55 wells were drilled in this field, 39 wells are active, which produce totally 93,000 barrels per day (14,800 m^{3}/d). The field is owned by state-owned National Iranian Oil Company (NIOC) and operated by National Iranian South Oil Company (NISOC).

== See also ==
- List of oil fields
