= Ku-Maloob-Zaap =

Oil field in Mexico

- Country: Mexico
- Region: North America
- Offshore/onshore: Offshore
- Operator: Pemex

Field history
- Discovery: 1979
- Start of production: 1981
- Peak of production: 2015

Production
- Current production of oil: 589,000 barrels per day (~2.93×10^{7} t/a)
- Year of current production of oil: 2024
- Producing formations: Kimmeridgian, Lower Paleocene-Upper Cretaceous and Middle Eocene

Ku-Maloob-Zaap is an oil field in Mexico. It is made up of three relatively large fields, Ku, Maloob, and Zaap, which are located to the immediate northwest of the Cantarell field. The field lies in 100 m (330 ft) of water.

Ku-Maloob-Zaap is located offshore in the Bay of Campeche, off the coast of Tabasco, 105 kilometres (65 mi) from Ciudad del Carmen. It was discovered by PEMEX, Mexico's national oil company, in 1979. It covers an area of 121 square kilometres (47 sq mi), and includes five fields: Ku, Maloob, Zaap, Bacab, Lum, and Zazil-Ha. The Ku, Maloob, and Zaap fields produce from the Kimmeridgian, Lower Paleocene-Upper Cretaceous, and Middle Eocene reservoirs. Total reserves of the field have been put at 4.9 billion barrels.

== Production history ==
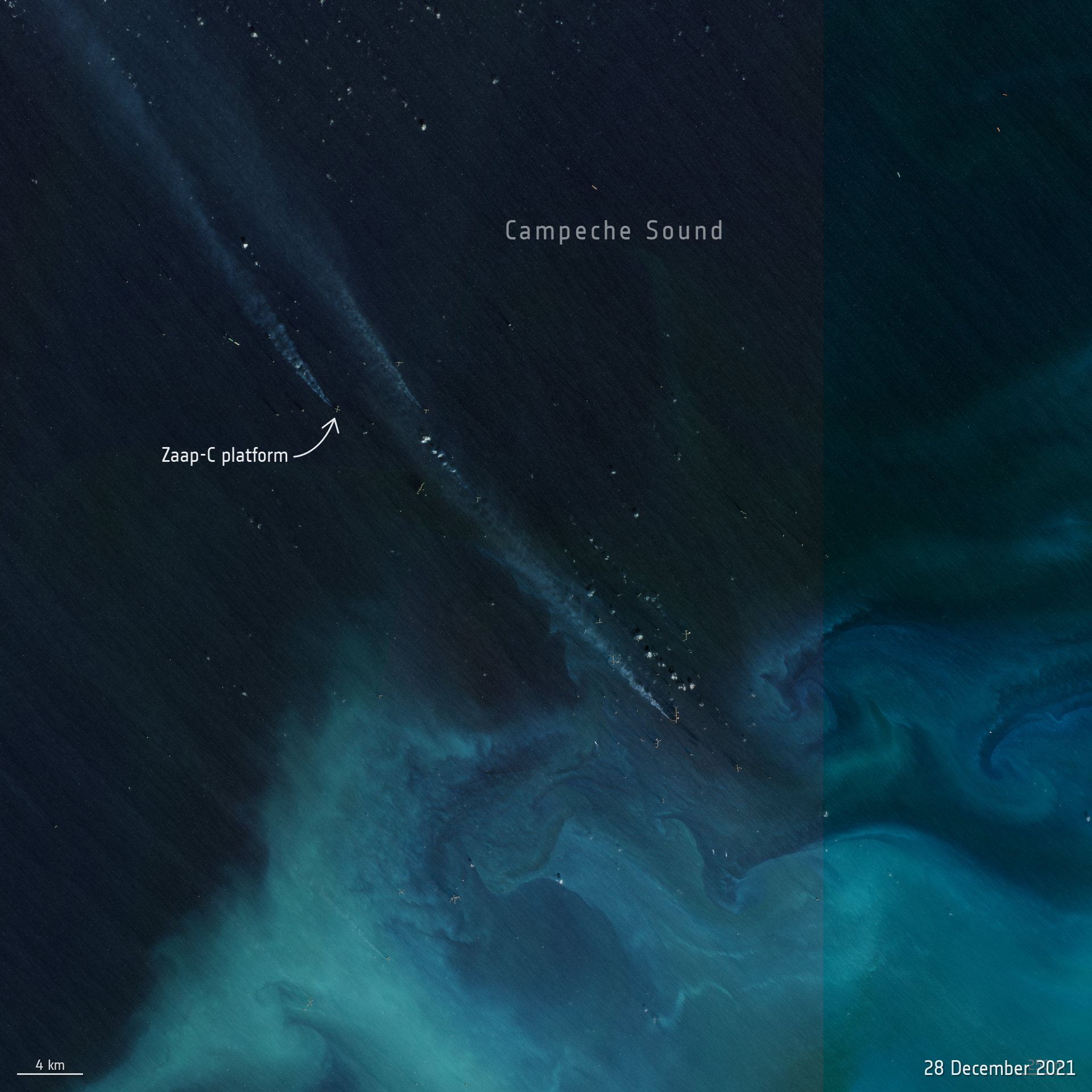
The Zaap-C platform

The Ku field was discovered in 1980, the Maloob field in 1984 and Zaap in 1991. First oil from the Ku field was produced in 1981.

The KMZ development included drilling 82 wells, four of which are nitrogen injectors and installation of 17 oil platforms: seven drilling, four production, four accommodation, one telecommunication and one processing. There are 42 oil pipelines of 166 kilometres (103 mi) to transport the oil produced. It was expected that by 2011, production would reach 800,000 barrels per day (130,000 m^{3}/d) of oil and 282 million cubic feet per day (8.0×10^{6} m^{3}/d) of natural gas.

This target was met by November 2009 when oil production reached 802,002 barrels per day (127,508.1 m^{3}/d). The field produced 839,200 barrels per day (133,420 m^{3}/d) crude oil in 2010. Production rose to 853,000 barrels per day (135,600 m^{3}/d) in November 2015. This new rate of production and the decline in production at the Cantarell Field made Ku-Maloob-Zaap Mexico's most productive oil field.

KMZ is among the company’s most profitable producing assets, according to Welligence Energy Analytics. Pemex reported average production costs of $10.37/boe at KMZ as of end-2019.

On 2 July 2021, Mexico's state-owned oil company PEMEX suffered an undersea gas pipeline rupture in the Ku-Maloob-Zaap field. The leak and subsequent fire lasted for five hours.

Then, in August, an explosion and fire on the E-Ku-A2 platform killed at least five workers and injured more. This platform is also part of the Ku-Maloob-Zaap complex.

== Production decline ==
Production in the Ku-Maloob-Zaap fields has entered a declining phase. Production declined to 770,000 barrels per day (122,000 m^{3}/d) in July 2019. Subsequently production plunged to 640,000 barrels per day (102,000 m^{3}/d) in July 2020. The uncertainty created by Covid-19 contributed to the decline in production. The production recovered to 719,000 barrels per day (114,300 m^{3}/d) in 2021. The field produced 700,000 barrels per day (110,000 m^{3}/d) in 2022 which was roughly 40% of Pemex total output.

To maintain production in the Ku Maloob Zaap field, PEMEX has adopted techniques such as management of production limits and nitrogen injection.

As of 2024, the field produced 589,000 barrels per day.

== See also ==
- List of oil fields
