= Russkoye field =

Russian West Siberian petroleum field

Coordinates: 66°N 80°E

- Location within Russia
- Country: Russia
- Region: Yamalo-Nenets Autonomous Okrug
- Location: Tazovsky District
- Offshore/onshore: onshore
- Operator: Tyumenneftegaz
- Owner: Rosneft

Production
- Estimated oil in place: 1500 million tonnes (~ 1.7×10^{9} m^{3} or 11,000 million bbl)
- Recoverable oil (million tonnes): 410
- Recoverable gas: 85×10^{9} m^{3} (3.0×10^{12} cu ft)

The Russkoye field is a heavy crude oil field located in the Tazovsky District, Yamalo-Nenets Autonomous Okrug, Russia. It is one of the largest fields in Russia. The field is developed by Tyumenneftegaz, a former subsidiary of TNK-BP and the current subsidiary of Rosneft.

The in-place reserves of the field are estimated at 1.5 billion tons and recoverable reserves are estimated at 410 million tons of oil. Recoverable gas reserves are over 85 billion cubic meters. Oil field lays 800–900 metres (2,600–3,000 ft) deep. Oil from the Russkoye field is characterized by high viscosity.

Pilot production started in 2007. As of 2009, there were 10 wells in the field, including four producing wells. As there is no permanent transportation road to the field, production is carried out only during the winter time, which allows usage of ice roads. The permanent road to the field will be built in 2011.

Commercial production is expected to start in late 2015 or early 2016. To improve oil recovery TNK-BP is planning to use injection of hot water and steam into the formation.

== See also ==
- Samotlor Field
- Trebs and Titov oil fields
- Vankor Field
- Petroleum industry in Russia
