= Raudhatain =

Oilfield in Kuwait

Coordinates: 29.85°N 47.82°E

The Raudhatain oil field is an oil field in Northern Kuwait. It contains 6 billion barrels of oil. It is being heavily developed.

The oil field was discovered in 1955 and production started in 1959.

== See also ==
- List of oil fields
