= Bolivar Coastal Fields =

Oil field in Venezuela

Bolivar Coastal Complex
- Location within Venezuela
- Country: Venezuela
- Region: Bolivar
- Location: Lake Maracaibo
- Offshore/onshore: Onshore/Offshore
- Coordinates: 9.9°N 71.2°W
- Operator: PDVSA

Field history
- Discovery: 1914
- Start of development: 1917
- Start of production: 1922

Production
- Current production of oil: 800,000 barrels per day (~4.0×10^{7} t/a)
- Estimated oil in place: 44,000 million barrels (~6.0×10^{9} t)
- Recoverable oil: 3,032,000 million barrels (~4.136×10^{11} t)
- Producing formations: La Luna Colón

The Bolivar Coastal Fields (BCF), also known as the Bolivar Coastal Complex, is located on the eastern margin of Lake Maracaibo, Venezuela. Bolivar Coastal Field is the largest oil field in South America with its 6,000-7,000 wells and forest of related derricks, stretches thirty-five miles along the north-east coast of Lake Maracaibo. They form the largest oil field outside of the Middle East and contain mostly heavy oil with a gravity less than 22 degrees API. Also known as the Eastern Coast Fields, Bolivar Coastal Oil Field consists of Tía Juana, Lagunillas, Bachaquero, Ceuta, Motatán, Barua and Ambrosio. The Bolivar Coast field lies in the Maracaibo dry forests ecoregion, which has been severely damaged by farming and ranching as well as oil exploitation. The oil field still plays an important role in production from the nation with approximately 2.6 million barrels of oil a day. The oil and gas industry refers to the Bolivar Coastal Complex as a single oilfield, in spite of the fact that the oilfield consists of many sub-fields as stated above.

Bolivar Coastal Complex is entirely owned and operated by Petróleos de Venezuela, S.A. (PDVSA) (Spanish pronunciation: [peðeˈβesa]; English: Petroleum of Venezuela), the Venezuelan state-owned oil and natural gas company. It has activities in exploration, production, refining and exporting oil, as well as exploration and production of natural gas. Since its founding on 1 January 1976 with the nationalization of the Venezuelan oil industry, PDVSA has dominated the oil industry of Venezuela, the world's fifth largest oil exporter. According to the list of oil fields, the Bolivar Coastal Field is ranked #5 in the world in recoverable oil, past and future at 30-32 billion barrels. Portions of the oil field have already been fully depleted.

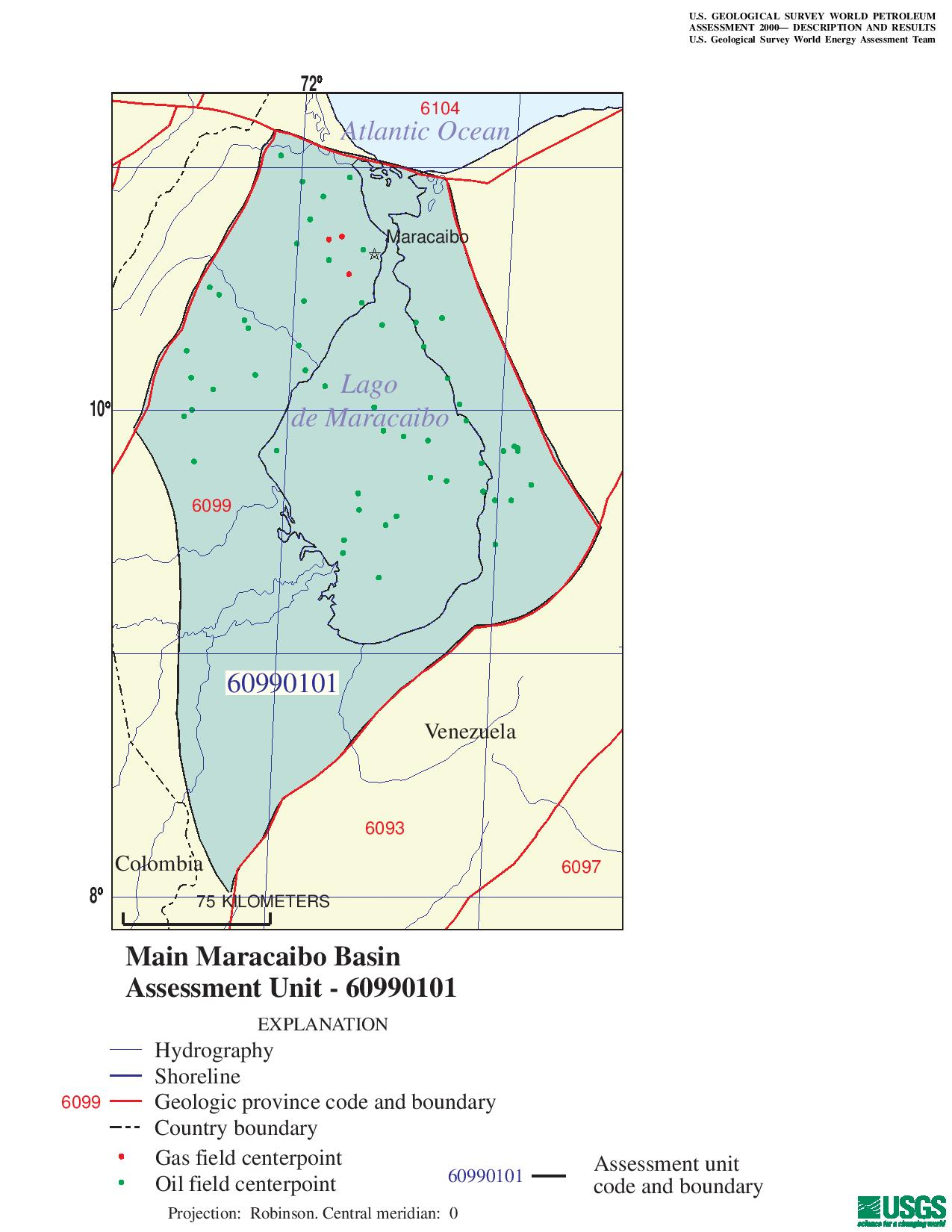
Image of main Maracaibo Assessment Unit

== History ==
The large oil seeps around Lake Maracaibo were noted in the 16th century by the Spanish, who used the tar to caulk their ships and treat skin problems on livestock. The U.S. based General Asphalt Company conducted the first geological investigations on the east shore of Lake Maracaibo but sold its concession to Royal Dutch Shell in 1912. Shell drilled the discovery well at Mene Grande in 1914 and the famous Los Barrosos 2 gusher at Cabimas in 1922. Another major find was the 'Zumaque 1' well in 1914, in the area of Mene Grande, Maracaibo Basin, about 50 miles (80 km) southeast of Cabimas (Zulia State). Production grew rapidly and this became Shell's most important producing property worldwide. Edward Doheny's Pan American Oil then took the unusual step of obtaining concessions in the lake itself. These concessions were purchased by Indiana Standard (now Amoco) in 1925, but development was minimal until they were sold to Standard Oil of New Jersey (now Exxon) in 1931. Development in Lake Maracaibo proceeded rapidly after the end of the Second World War and this became Exxon's most important producing property worldwide throughout the 1950s and 1960s.

Nationalism then played a role in the oil industry; no new exploration concessions were offered after 1958, and the industry was nationalized at the end of 1975. The nationalized entity, Petroleos de Venezuela SA, is now one of the world's largest integrated oil companies.

The award of marginal field reactivation blocks to Occidental and Shell in 1994 marked the beginning of a new phase of international participation in the Maracaibo basin. Another block was subsequently awarded to a consortium of Tecpetrol, Nomeco, and Wascana, and Chevron has agreed in principle with Maraven, a subsidiary of Petroleos de Venezuela, on a venture that would include the giant Boscan heavy oil field and Chevron's asphalt division in the U.S. Two blocks in the basin are to be offered in the 1995 exploration round.

In summary, the Maracaibo basin oil fields played a major role in the growth of three of the world's largest oil companies; the Royal Dutch/Shell group, Exxon, and Petroleos de Venezuela. Much early development of the technologies of offshore production and steam injection took place there.

Sir Henri Deterding once described Shell's purchase of the General Asphalt properties around Lake Maracaibo as his best business deal. That is a strong statement from someone whose business deals included the merger of Royal Dutch Petroleum with Shell Transport and Trading.

== Introduction ==
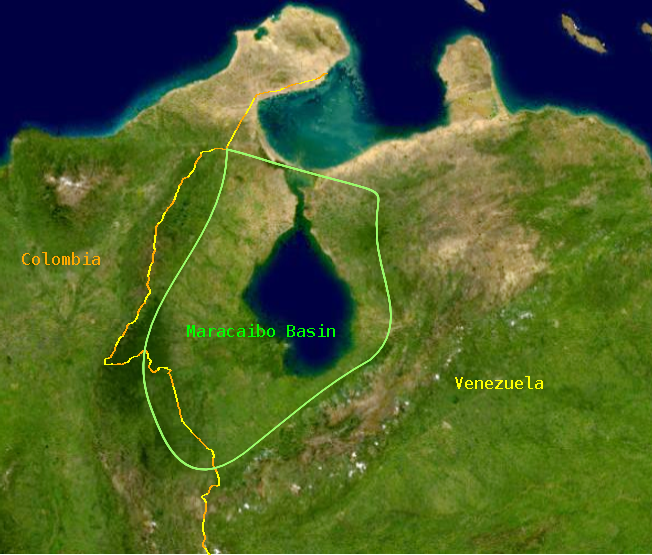
Satellite image showing the geographical location of the Maracaibo Basin

The Gulf Caribbean region currently contains 5% of the total ultimate recoverable reserves of hydrocarbons on Earth (Horn, 2003). Venezuela has the largest reserves of hydrocarbons of all the hydrocarbon regions of the western hemisphere, with proved oil reserves of about 70 billion bbl oil and proved gas reserves of 147 tcf (U.S. Geological Survey, 2000; Audemard and Serrano, 2001). These reserve estimates do not include the immense, unconventional reserves of the Orinoco heavy oil belt, with an estimated approximately 1200 billion bbl of heavy and extra-heavy oil in place (Fiorillo, 1987; U.S. Geological Survey, 2000). The active tectonic setting of petroleum in Venezuela is complex. Several tectonic belts that include volcanic-arc, fore-arc, and back-arc basins are found offshore of the Venezuelan margin. A west-to-east lounging pattern of thrusts and lateral ramp faults and foreland basins onshore (Babb and Mann, 1999; Mann, 1999) were produced by diachronous oblique convergence between Caribbean arc terranes and the South American continental margin from Late Cretaceous (western area of Colombia) to the present (eastern area of Trinidad). This ideal combination of tectonic and stratigraphic events yielded one of the most prolific petroleum systems in the world.

== Geology ==
The deposition of rift-related rocks in the Late Jurassic marked the beginning of the sedimentary geological history of the Maracaibo Basin in structural lows or half grabens controlled by linear, north-northeast–striking normal faults. During the Early Cretaceous–Paleocene, a mixed clastic-carbonate platform developed across the area of present-day Maracaibo Basin. Thermal subsidence and tectonic quiescence of the passive margin led to sediment accumulation and the absence of deformation of the basin during this period. The few structures present in the Maracaibo Basin during the Cretaceous formed by tectonic uplift of the Western and Central Cordilleras of Colombia. This uplift is responsible for an increase in subsidence by the end of the Cretaceous that resulted in deposition of thick marine shale of the Colon Formation during the Maastrichtian. During the late Turonian–Campanian, the La Luna Formation was deposited in a shelf-slope setting under anoxic conditions. The La Luna Formation became the main source rock of northwestern South America.

In the late Paleocene and early to middle Eocene, the Caribbean plate and the northwestern margin of South America produced a complex foreland wedge filled by clastic sediments in the northeastern part of the Maracaibo Basin. The foreland basin was characterized by an approximately 5-km (3.1-mi)-thick Eocene wedge of fluvial-deltaic sedimentation (Misoa Formation), where the most prolific hydrocarbon reservoirs of the Maracaibo Basin are concentrated. Fluvial and shallow-marine sedimentation continued in the south and southwest areas of the Maracaibo Basin. The Eocene unconformity represents the main seal above Eocene reservoirs, but it is locally breached by faulting, allowing the upward ascent of hydrocarbons into Miocene reservoirs at the basin edges.

== Petroleum systems ==
The figure below shows the hydrocarbon reservoirs in the Maracaibo basin. Most Eocene reservoir rocks are spatially aligned with the north-south–striking Icotea and Pueblo Viejo faults, whereas most Miocene reservoirs rocks are clustered along the eastern and northeastern margin of the present-day Lake Maracaibo.

Ninety four percent of hydrocarbon reservoirs in the Maracaibo Basin are found within Eocene–Miocene clastic rocks (Talukdar and Marcano, 1994). Only 6% of reservoirs are found within underlying Cretaceous–Paleocene carbonate rocks and basement.

The figure to the right shows an east-west and a north-south interpreted seismic line in the central Maracaibo Basin, summarizing the main elements of the Maracaibo petroleum system from Cretaceous source rock to Eocene and Miocene reservoirs. The two interpreted seismic lines show the northeast thickening of the Eocene clastic wedge, the southwest thickening of the Miocene–Holocene clastic wedge, and the main structural and stratigraphic controls of the basin inherited from the north-northeast–striking fault family.

=== Source rocks ===
Hydrocarbon source rocks in the Maracaibo Basin are Upper Cretaceous marine carbonate rocks (calcareous shales and argillaceous limestones) that make up the La Luna Formation of Cenomanian–Campanian age. Previous geochemical studies show that the La Luna Formation is the source of 98% of the total oil reserves found in the Maracaibo Basin. An additional 2% of the total oil reserve was derived from nonmarine coals and shales of the Paleocene Orocue Formation that are found in the southwestern part of the basin. Gonzalez de Juana et al. (1980) proposed that Eocene and Miocene terrestrial source rocks, now deeply buried in the southern part of the basin, may act as additional source rock to the La Luna Formation. Geochemical analysis of Tertiary sedimentary rocks indicates no significant hydrocarbon potential for Eocene and Miocene shale, nor is there any evidence for oils correlated to this type of source rocks.

A Santonian change in depositional environment to more oxygenated and cooler waters in the La Luna Formation (Tres Esquinas Member) suggests the advent of tectonic activity (Erlich et al., 2000; Bralower and Lorente; 2003; Parra et al., 2003; Zapata et al., 2003). Late Cretaceous tectonic activity was possibly related to the reactivation of faults beneath the basin or regional plate convergence in western Colombia that caused abrupt changes in the paleotopography and paleoclimate and ended passive-margin conditions. An increase in upwelling and more oxygenation of shelf waters of northern South America may be related to (1) the migration of the South American plate toward the Cretaceous intertropical convergence zone (Villamil et al., 1999); (2) an increase in freshwater runoff produced by the emergent Central Cordillera of Colombia (Erlich et al., 2003); and (3) the establishment of wet-dry cycles and submersion of paleobathymetric barriers for ocean circulation (Erlich et al., 2003).

==== La Luna source rocks and hydrocarbon characteristics ====
The La Luna formation is the most prominent formation in the Maracaibo Basin and is the source rock content for majority of Bolivar Coastal Field. This is considered to be a great oil-prone source rock. At the figure to the right, the distribution in percentages of hydrocarbon generated by the La Luna formation source rocks is shown.

Comparison of gas-chromatographic and biomarker characteristics of oils and La Luna source rock extracts shows that the La Luna Formation is the source rock for more than 98% of the oil accumulations in the Maracaibo Basin. The La Luna source rocks contain oil-prone type II kerogen and are rich in hydrogen content, with the bulk of the organic matter derived from algae and bacteria (Perez-Infante et al., 1996). The average original total organic carbon (TOC) of La Luna source rocks in the Maracaibo Basin is 5.6%. Maximum TOC values are locally as high as 16.7%. In the southwestern area of the basin, the average TOC is 4.3%. In the Sierra de Perijá area, TOC values range from 3.7 to 5.7%. In the Merida Andes, TOC values range between 1.7 and 2%. At the figure to the right, the distribution in percentages of hydrocarbon generated by the La Luna formation source rocks is shown. Comparison of gas-chromatographic and biomarker characteristics of oils and La Luna source rock extracts shows that the La Luna Formation is the source rock for more than 98% of the oil accumulations in the Maracaibo Basin.

=== Reservoir rocks ===
They are a wide variety of reservoir rocks throughout the Maracaibo Basin, ranging from metamorphic rocks to shallow, unconsolidated, Miocence rocks. According to Harding and Tuminas, structural traps are controlled by a variety of features, including normal fault, inverted faults on the flexed continental plate. Stratigraphic traps are found in heterogeneous, mixed fluvial, and tidal-dominated deltaic systems defining regressive-transgressive cycles on the Eocene Maracaibo shelf and nearshore to fluvial Miocene sandstone rocks (Guzmn and Fisher, 2006). Major reservoir facies are stacked distributary channels and tidal bars (Maguregui, 1990; Ambrose et al., 1995; Escalona, 2003). Hydrocarbon reservoirs can be classified in three main types:

- Sub-Eocene Reservoirs
  - Cretaceous limestone and Paleocene sandstone
  - Reservoirs include fractured rocks associated with the reactivation of north-south strike-slip, northwest-southeast–striking normal fault, and thrusts related to the uplift of Merida Andes
- Eocene Reservoirs
  - Most prolific
  - Structural traps associated with anticlines (i.e. Icotea and Pueblo faults)
  - Eocene unconformity forms traps in fluvial deltaic sandstone
- Miocene Reservoirs
  - Second most prolific
  - Fluvial Miocene sandstone facies located in anticlines
  - Stratigraphic wedges beneath Eocene unconformity (i.e. Burro Negro fault)
  - Oil escaped to the surface and formed seeps that outline the edges of the Maracaibo basin where no structural or stratigraphic traps were present

== Migration and trapping ==
Petroleum geologists summarize the petroleum system evolution of the Maracaibo Basin in four phases. The adjacent image shows the four main tectonic phases controlling the petroleum system of the Maracaibo Basin.

=== Carbonate Platform Phase ===
During this phase in the Late Cretaceous to Paleocene, the La Luna Formation source rock was deposited on a shallow, passive-margin, shelf-to-slope environment. It thickness ranges from 40 to 150 m (130 to 490 ft). Carbonate thickness variations were controlled by minor basement relief of underlying pre-Cretaceous structures like the Merida arch.

=== Foreland Phase ===
During the early Eocene, oblique collision between the Caribbean and South American plates formed an asymmetric wedge of fluvial-deltaic Eocene rocks that were deposited in a foreland basin (Lugo and Mann, 1995; Escalona and Mann, 2006a). Cretaceous source rocks were buried to depths of 5 km (3.1 mi) in the north-northeastern part of the Maracaibo Basin and reached the oil window. A pull-apart basin controlled by reactivated Jurassic north-northeast–striking faults formed in the central Maracaibo Basin (Icotea subbasin; Escalona and Mann, 2003b). Strike-slip faults provided vertical pathways for hydrocarbon migration from Cretaceous source rocks (La Luna Formation) to Eocene reservoir sands.

=== Isostatic Rebound Phase ===
During the late Eocene to Oligocene, most of the Maracaibo Basin was sub-aerially exposed and eroded by isostatic rebound that followed the end of the convergence foreland basin phase. This period of rebound and erosion lasted approximately 20 m.y. in the central parts of the basin and is characterized by the loss of hydrocarbons to the surface (Talukdar and Marcano, 1994). Furthermore, biodegradation of oils occurred because of the invasion of meteoric waters into shallowly buried Eocene reservoirs.

Summary of four main tectonic phases controlling the petroleum system of the Maracaibo Basin: (A) carbonate platform phase; (B) foreland basin phase; (C) isostatic rebound phase; and (D) Maracaibo syncline phase.

=== Maracaibo Syncline Phase ===
During the Miocene to Holocene, this phase of basin development was characterized by uplift of the Sierra de Perija and the Merida Andes, the formation of the north-south–trending Maracaibo syncline, and early Miocene inversion of Eocene structures in the central part of the basin. In contrast to the Eocene, the Neogene depocenter was located in the southern Maracaibo Basin, where continental facies pinch out to the east-northeast to form major stratigraphic traps.

== Future ==
During the Cretaceous era, the combination of deformation, burial, and sedimentation in the Maracaibo Basin made it the most effective petroleum systems on Earth. Deposition and distribution of source and reservoir rocks were stratigraphically and structurally controlled by multiple tectonic events that led to hydrocarbon generation, migration, and accumulation. The Maracaibo Basin has a promising hydrocarbon discovery potential in the mostly undrilled deeper structural and stratigraphic traps of the central and eastern basin (e.g., Icotea and Pueblo Viejo subbasins). More than 14 billion bbl of medium to light oil of ultimate recoverable reserves are predicted to be produced from these areas (U.S. Geological Survey, 2000). The Maracaibo basin has a long history as a major oil producing basin, but many areas remain poorly explored. The large exploration potential combined with the enormous amount of remaining oil in place in known reservoirs guarantees that the Maracaibo basin is likely to have a long future as a major oil producing basin.

=== Production ===
While the field once produced between 2.5 - 3 million barrels per day, production levels have declined due to reasons, including aging infrastructure, US sanctions, etc. Currently as of 2025, the field is estimated to have produced between 800,000 - 900,000 barrels per day.

== See also ==
- Ghawar field, largest conventional oilfield in the world
- List of oil fields, list of most notable oilfields in the world
- Petrocaribe, oil alliance of many Caribbean states with Venezuela to purchase oil on conditions of preferential payment
- Oil reserves in Venezuela, additional quantitative data on Venezuela's reserves
