= Shadegan oil field =

Oil field in Khuzestan, Iran

- Location within Iran
- Country: Iran
- Region: Khuzestan Province
- Offshore/onshore: Onshore
- Coordinates: 30°38′59″N 48°39′53″E
- Operators: NISOC
- Partners: NIOC

Field history
- Discovery: 1968
- Start of production: 1988

Production
- Current production of oil: 69,000 barrels per day (~3.4×10^{6} t/a)
- Estimated oil in place: 3,300 million barrels (~4.5×10^{8} t)

The Shadegan oil field is an Iranian oil field located in Khuzestan Province, in the south west of Ahvaz City. It was discovered in 1968 and the production was started in 1988. The field has 23 km in length 6 km in width and includes two reservoirs. Shadegan field is currently with 20 active oil wells and crude oil production is about 69,000 barrels per day (11,000 m^{3}/d). The field is owned by National Iranian Oil Company (NIOC) and operated by National Iranian South Oil Company (NISOC).

== See also ==
- List of oil fields
