= Maracaibo Basin =

Foreland basin in Venezuela

- Depresión del lago de Maracaibo
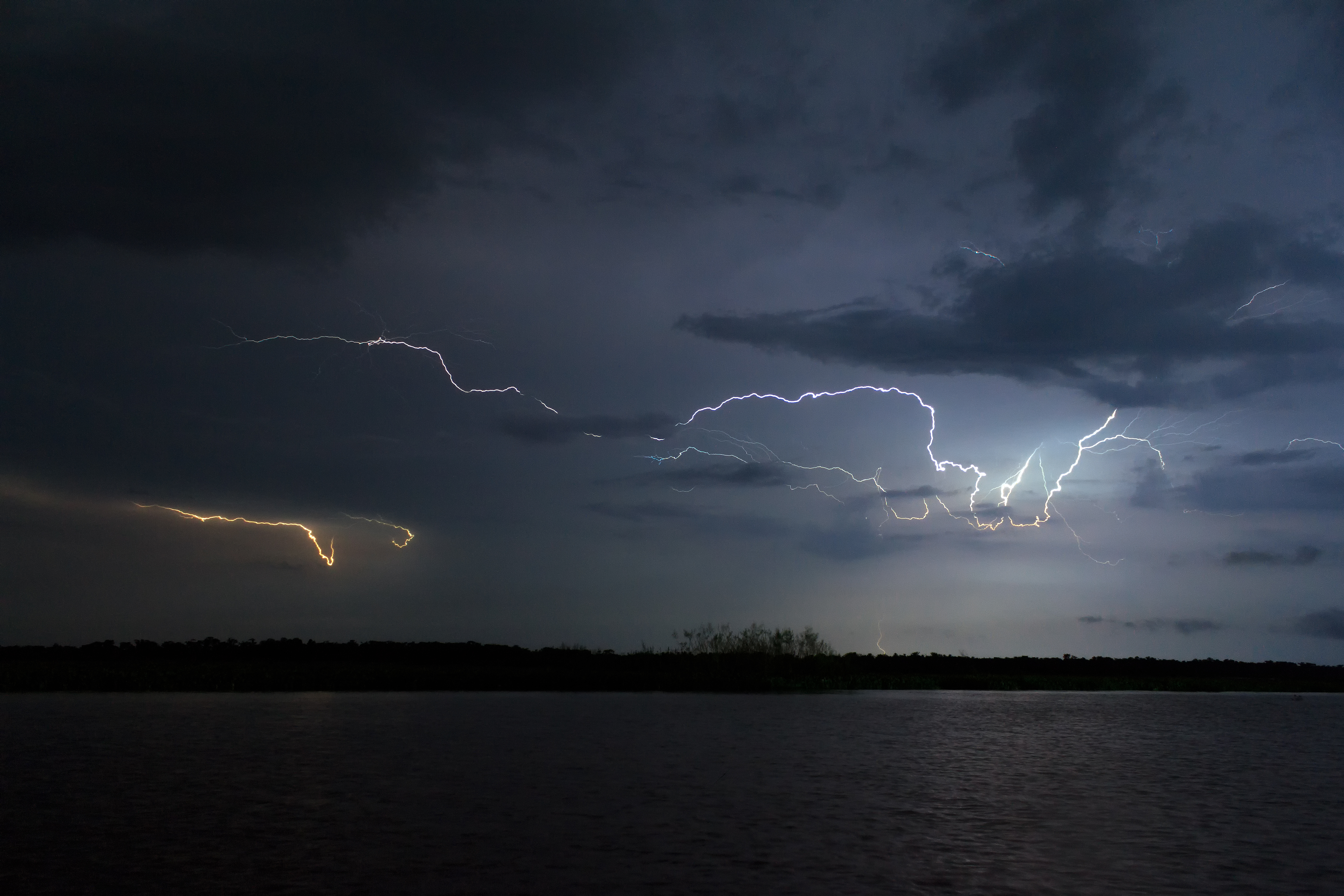
- Catatumbo lightning

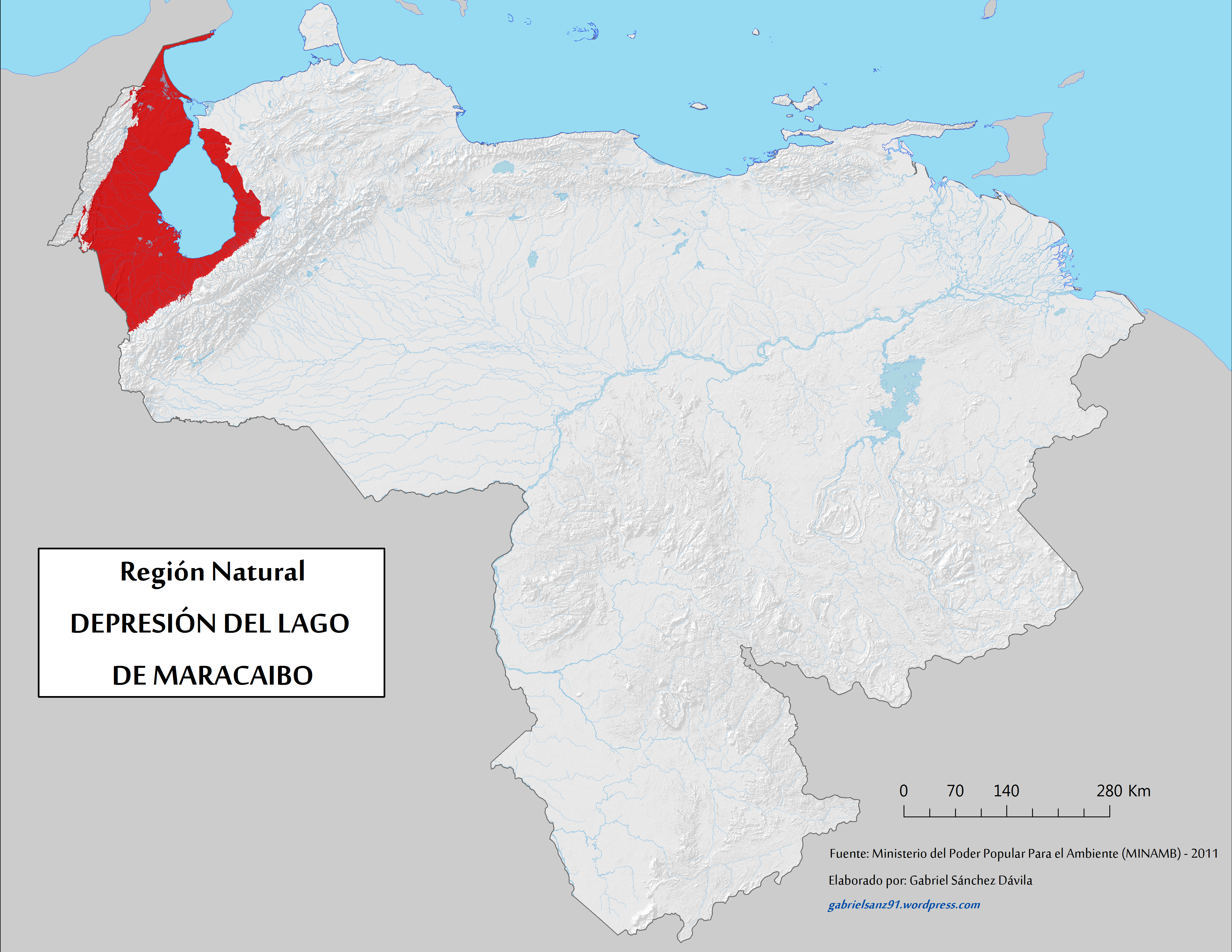
- Geographic map of the natural region of Lake Maracaibo Depression.
- Floor elevation: −12–200 m (−39–656 ft)
- Area: 36,803 km^{2} (14,210 mi^{2})

Geography
- Country: Venezuela
- States: Zulia; Mérida; Trujillo; Táchira
- Coordinates: 9°N 71°W

The Maracaibo Basin, also known as Lake Maracaibo natural region, Lake Maracaibo depression or Lake Maracaibo Lowlands, is a foreland basin and one of the eight natural regions of Venezuela, found in the northwestern corner of Venezuela in South America. Covering over 36,657 square km, it is a hydrocarbon-rich region that has produced over 30 billion bbl of oil with an estimated 44 billion bbl yet to be recovered. The basin is characterized by a large shallow tidal estuary, Lake Maracaibo, located near its center. The Maracaibo basin has a complex tectonic history that dates back to the Jurassic period with multiple evolution stages. Despite its complexity, these major tectonic stages are well preserved within its stratigraphy. This makes The Maracaibo basin one of the most valuable basins for reconstructing South America's early tectonic history.

== Geologic setting ==
The Maracaibo basin is surrounded by two mountain ranges, the Méridas Andes to the southeast and the Sierra de Perija to the west, with the Gulf of Venezuela to the north. The basin lies within a region of deformation created by the interactions of the Caribbean and South American Plate boundaries. These interactions include the collision of the Caribbean Plate with the South American Plate in the Cenozoic era, which formed a belt of foreland basins across northern South America. There are three main fault zones associated with the basin: the Santa Marta-Bucaramanga fault zone, the Boconó fault zone, and the Oca fault zone. These strike-slip zones create a v-shape around the basin which form a smaller plate known as the Maracaibo block. Within this v-shaped wedge, multiple smaller fault zones are present including the Icotea strike-slip fault. Thus the Maracaibo basin geometry is dominated by strike-slip tectonics and subordinate folding with a main syncline, the Maracaibo syncline, striking north-south through the center of Lake Maracaibo.

== Tectonic history ==
The formation of the Maracaibo basin began 160 Ma with the North American, South American, and Caribbean plates playing key roles in the evolution of the basin. It developed into the present-day foreland basin via multiple stages throughout time: Late Jurassic, Late Cretaceous, Paleocene-Eocene, and the Oligocene-Holocene stages.

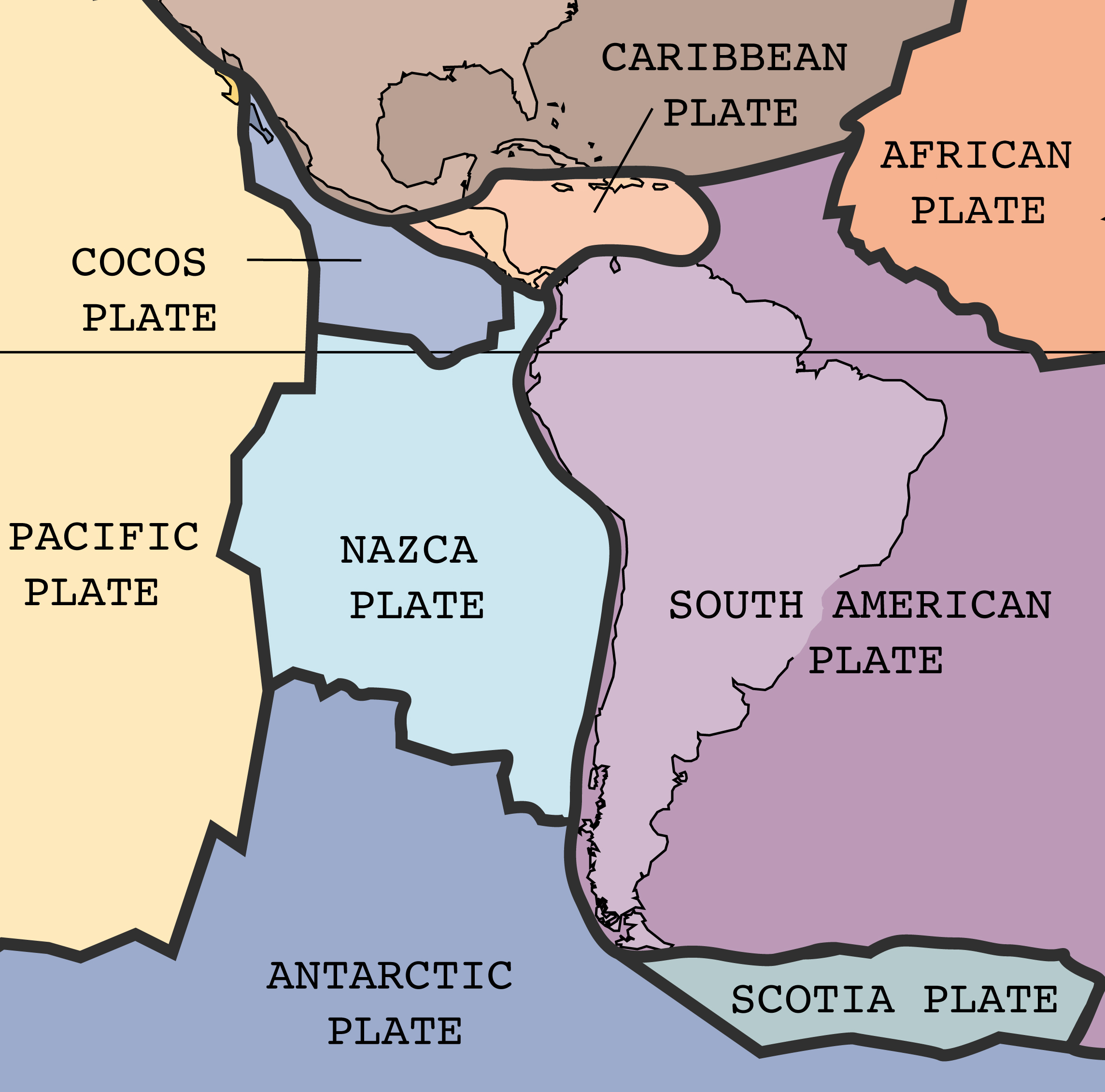
Present-day tectonic plate position and geometry

=== Late Jurassic ===
During the break-up of Pangea, the North American Plate began to separate from the South American Plate. The two plates rifted away from each other forming the "Proto-Caribbean Seaway", an 1800 km wide region of oceanic crust. As this rifting occurred, the Caribbean plate began its eastward migration from the Pacific region.

=== Late Cretaceous ===
After rifting, the northern edge of the South American Plate developed into a passive margin with the Proto-Caribbean Seaway. This stable passive margin allowed for thermal subsidence to occur which began to increase due to the building up of the Cordillera Central range of Colombia. This uplift was initiated by the eastward moving Caribbean plate interacting with the Nazca and northwestern South American plate.

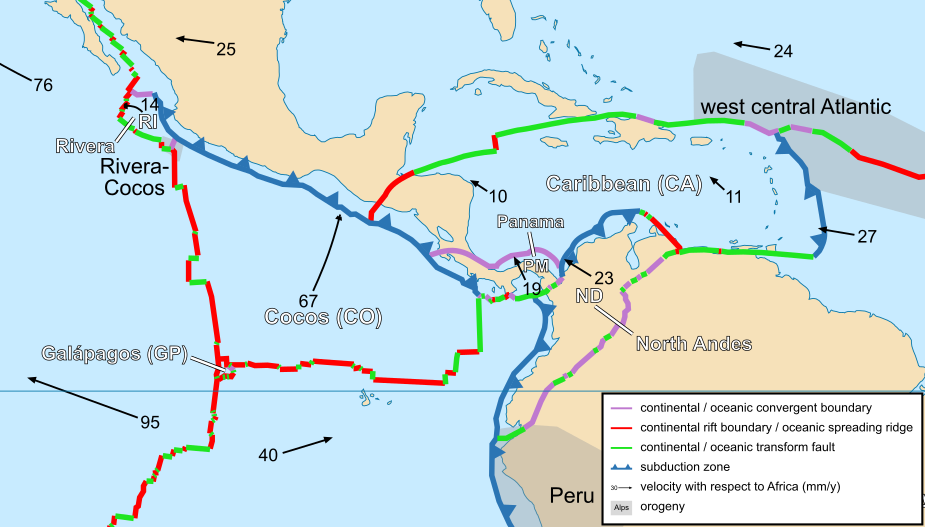
Caribbean plate tectonics

=== Paleocene-Eocene ===
The Caribbean Plate has been migrating eastward from the Pacific region and eventually collided with the South American Plate in the middle Paleocene. This collision transformed the passive margin of northern South America into an active margin. The Caribbean plate had subducted significant amounts of oceanic Proto-Caribbean crust by this time and was now subducting beneath the South American crust. This boundary interaction was greatly affecting the region of northwestern South America. Foreland basins formed across the region which received large amount of sediment due to the plate boundary interactions to the north.

=== Oligocene-Holocene ===
The Caribbean plate continued its eastward migration and continued to deform the northwestern regions of South America while also producing deformation along the northeastern regions. As plate migration proceeded, accretion along the South American plate increased. This accretion greatly influenced mountain building of the region. Uplift of the Sierra de Perijas occurred during the Oligocene whereas the Mérida Andes formed later in the middle Miocene. This uplift and subsequent erosion deposited large amount of sediment into the basin. The Maracaibo syncline formed later in this stage due to "inversion of Eocene rift-related structures".

== Stratigraphy ==
The main events of sediment deposition follow the same pattern as the tectonic events, where major sedimentary formations coincide with the four tectonic stages mentioned above.

=== Depositional history ===
The break-up of Pangea resulted in the break-up of the Paleozoic metamorphic basement rock. The basement rock formed half-grabens where eroded sediments from the break-up were then deposited. These sediments created the metasedimentary rocks of the La Quinta formation. Development of the passive margin occurred after rifting. Characterized by carbonate and shale, the stable passive margin allowed for large amounts of clastic sediment to deposit and stay undisturbed until burial. Some of the most important source rocks come from this stage, including the La Luna and Socuy formations. The timing of the Paleogene collision is clearly recorded in the stratigraphy of the Maracaibo basin. There is an abrupt change in sediment type of the late Cretaceous made evident by the thickly deposited, pelagic shale of the Colon formation. This represents the beginnings of the Caribbean arc collision with the South American plate. As the collision continued, this region shifted from the passive margin stage to the foreland basin stage. These Paleogene sediments are characterized by fluvial and deltaic facies and make up the Misoa formation, fluvial sandstones that act as hydrocarbon reservoirs. Mountain building begins in the late Paleogene, producing mostly continental sandstone facies.

== Icotea pull-apart basin ==
The Icotea pull-apart basin is a unique transtensional feature in the center of the Maracaibo Basin. This basin is fault bounded on all 4 sides and formed due to strike slip involved extension along the north to south striking left lateral Icotea strike slip fault. The Icotea fault originally formed as a normal fault during a Mesozoic rifting phase and was subsequently reactivated as a strike slip fault during the late Paleocene. There is a record of 7.5-18 km of fault offset. The basin records 3 km of Eocene sediment fill in a depocenter located in the northern part of the basin. Extension in the Icotea basin is estimated to be between 0.8-2.25 km. Since the Oligocene, basin extension, strike slip motion and basin fill has ceased and inversion has progressed in consequence to continued uplift of the Sierra de Perija and development of the convergent Maracaibo syncline.

== Hydrocarbon resources ==
Maracaibo, Cabimas, Ciudad Ojeda and Gibraltar

Oil was discovered in producible quantities in Venezuela in 1914 at the town of Mene Grande in the east central part of the Maracaibo basin near a surface oil seep.

In December 1922, Royal Dutch Shell's George Reynolds (formerly with the Anglo-Persian Oil Company) discovered the La Rosa Oil Field. The Barroso Well blew out at 100 thousand BOPD. In 1928, Jersey Standard discovered oil deposits under Lake Maracaibo.

Today the basin accounts for approximately 50% of Venezuela's crude export capacity and approximately 15% of proven Venezuelan oil reserves. The region hosts one of the world's largest oil refinery complexes, the Paraguaná Refinery Complex. The nearby islands of Aruba and Curaçao also host large refineries that process oil from the Maracaibo basin. Together these refineries form the 'Venezuelan Circuit' of PDVSA.

The Bolivar Coastal Field, BCF, on the eastern shore of Lake Maracaibo produces from Miocene sandstones and Eocene sandstones. West of Maracaibo, the La Paz Field produces from Cretaceous limestones, and oil is found in the stratigraphic traps of Boscan, Los Claros and the Urdaneta fields.

Venezuela produces a mix of conventional heavy crude and unconventional crude derived from bitumen. This latter source, previously too expensive to produce in quantity, now makes up an increasing large percent of Venezuela's oil exports – 600,000 of Venezuela's three million barrels per day in 2006. In the Maracaibo Basin, the balance of reserves is toward its conventional deposits. As the country continues shifting toward bitumen production due to its increasing profitability and decreases in conventional reserves, the level of Maracaibo Basin oil production will decrease, while that of the Orinoco Belt and its massive bitumen deposits will increase.

== See also ==
Creole Petroleum Corporation

- List of oil fields
