= Boscán Field =

Oil field in Venezuela

The Boscán Oil Field is located 40 km southwest of Maracaibo, Venezuela, and covers an area of about 660 square kilometers (240 square miles). The field produces a 10.5 degree API gravity crude oil from the Eocene Misoa Formation locally called the Boscán Formation. Current estimates of oil in place are greater than 25 billion barrels of oil.

The field was discovered in 1946 by Chevron with drilling of the Zulia 7F-1 well (renamed BN-257) which tested 730 barrels per day (116 m^{3}/d). This well encountered reservoir section very close to the Boscán east bounding fault at about 5,900 feet (1,800 m) measured depth (MD). Production began in 1947. Coastal and mixed-swamp plants are considered to have been the basis of the oil being formed.

The field is currently operated by the Empresa Mixta Petroboscan, a joint venture between Petroleos de Venezuela (PDVSA) and Chevron.

== Stratigraphy ==
The stratigraphic section at Boscán Field consists of sands and shales of Oligocene and Eocene ages deposited in a tidally-influenced fluvial-deltaic depositional setting. The Oligocene sediments are commonly non-oil bearing and are dominantly shaley. The Eocene sands are part of the Misoa Formation and form the producing reservoir section locally known as the Boscán Formation.

== Structure ==
The Boscán structure is a southwest-dipping monocline (flat, tilting surface) which contains oil over a very large depth range from 4,500 feet (1,400 m) to 9,500 feet (2,900 m) below sea level. The reservoir is broken by a series of normal faults, many of which have strike-slip movement; these faults may compartmentalize the reservoir over parts of the field.

== Trapping mechanism ==
The productive section in the field is associated with a regional unconformity between the Oligocene Icotea Formation and the older Eocene sandstones. Shales and other tight formations in the Icotea Formation provide the trap preventing vertical migration. On the east side of the field a large strike-slip fault provides additional trapping of oil, preventing it from moving laterally to the east.

== Production ==
Boscán Field has produced over 1.6 billion barrels (250,000,000 m^{3}) of oil, less than 6% of oil in place. There have been a total of 950 oil wells drilled in the field with approximately 525 active wells as of December, 2015. Current production is approximately 110,000 barrels per day. The reservoir drive is a combination of weak aquifer drive on the south flank, solution gas expansion, and gravity drainage. Produced water is currently injected at a rate of approximately 90,000 barrels per day for pressure maintenance support. To increase oil production, the shallower northern part of the Boscán Field was used. Chevron used steam injection, waterflooding, and diluent and solvent injection for these experiments. Results show that these methods had significant upside oil recovery potential.

== See also ==
- List of oil fields
