= Lower Zakum oil field =

Oil field in Abu Dhabi, UAE

Coordinates: 24.8530°N 53.6620°E

Lower Zakum Oil Field
- Country: United Arab Emirates
- Region: Persian Gulf
- Offshore/onshore: offshore
- Operator: Abu Dhabi National Oil Company

Field history
- Discovery: 1963
- Start of production: 1963

Production
- Current production of oil: 425,000 barrels per day (~2.12×10^{7} t/a)
- Estimated oil in place: 2420 million tonnes (~ 2.73×10^{9} m^{3} or 17200 million bbl)
- Estimated gas in place: 12,400×10^{9} cu ft (350×10^{9} m^{3})

The Lower Zakum Oil Field is the lower horizons of the Zakum oil field 84 km northwest of Abu Dhabi Islands. The upper reservoir horizons are known as Upper Zakum oil field.

Discovered in 1963 and developed by Abu Dhabi National Oil Company, the oil field is owned by Abu Dhabi National Oil Company and operated by ADNOC Offshore.

The 40% foreign interest is split among Japan's INPEX (lead partner - 10%), the Chinese CNPC (10%), India's ONGC Videsh (10%), Italy's ENI (5%) and France's Total (5%).

The total proven reserves of the Lower Zakum oil field are around 17.2 billion barrels (2.42 billion tonnes), and production is centered on 425,000 barrels per day (67,600 m^{3}/d).
