= Jidong Nanpu oil field =

Offshore oil field

Jidong Nanpu
- Country: China
- Region: Bohai Bay
- Offshore/onshore: offshore
- Operator: China National Petroleum Corporation

Field history
- Discovery: 2005
- Start of production: 2006

Production
- Estimated oil in place: 1000 million tonnes (~ 1.18×10^{9} m^{3} or 7450 million bbl)

The Jidong Nanpu oil field is an oil field located in Bohai Bay, China. It was discovered in 2005 and developed by China National Petroleum Corporation. It began production in 2006 and produces oil. The total proven reserves of the Jidong Nanpu oil field are around 7.45 billion barrels (1 billion tonnes), and production is centered on 200,000 barrels per day (32,000 m^{3}/d).
