= Nahr Umr Field =

Oilfield in Iraq

- Location within Iraq
- Country: Iraq
- Offshore/onshore: onshore
- Coordinates: 30°52′17″N 47°39′02″E
- Operators: Iraq Ministry of Oil

Field history
- Discovery: 1948

Production
- Estimated oil in place: 6,600 million barrels (~9.0×10^{8} t)

Nahr Umr Field is an oil field, located north of Basrah, Iraq. Nahr Umr Field is proven to hold 6.6 billion barrels of recoverable reserve. The oil field was discovered in 1948 by the Basrah Petroleum Company, an associate of the Iraq Petroleum Company.

== See also ==
- Basrah
