= Cantarell Field =

Offshore oil field in Mexico

Coordinates: 19°45′09″N 92°30′58″W

Cantarell
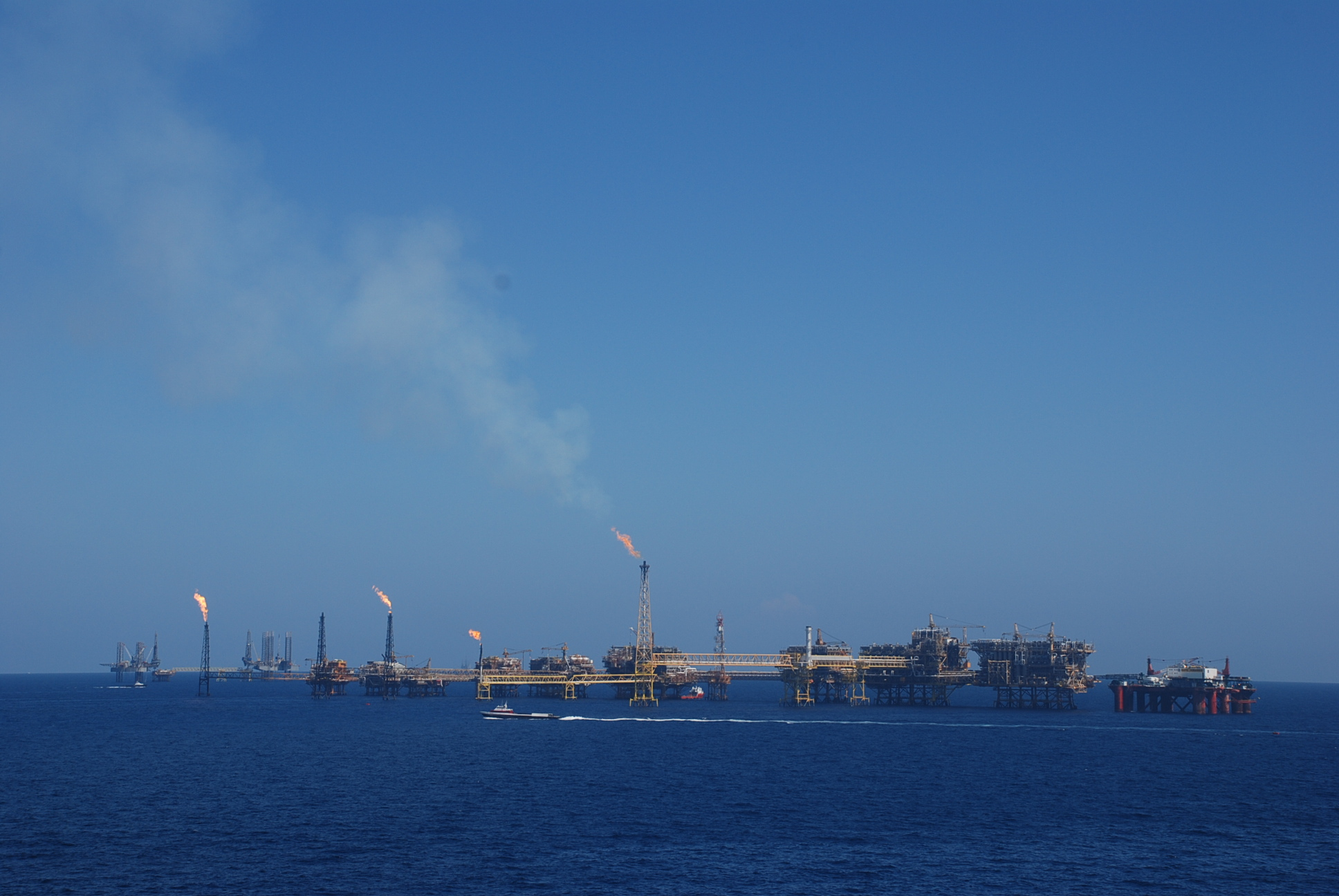
- Cantarell offshore rigs, 2009
- Country: Mexico
- Region: North America
- Offshore/onshore: Offshore
- Operator: Pemex

Field history
- Discovery: 1976
- Start of production: 1979
- Peak of production: 2004

Production
- Current production of oil: 141,500 barrels per day (~7.051×10^{6} t/a)
- Year of current production of oil: 2024
- Producing formations: Jurassic

Cantarell Field or Cantarell Complex is an aging supergiant offshore oil field in Mexico. It was discovered in 1976 after oil stains were noticed by a fisherman, Rudesindo Cantarell Jimenez, in 1972. It was placed on nitrogen injection in 2000, and production peaked at 2.1 million barrels per day (330,000 m^{3}/d) in 2004. In terms of cumulative production to date, it was the largest oil field in Mexico, and one of the largest in the world. However, production has declined since 2004, falling to 158,300 barrels per day (25,200 m^{3}/d) in 2022. In 2009 it was superseded by Ku-Maloob-Zaap as Mexico's largest oil field.

== Location ==
Cantarell is located 80 kilometres (50 mi) offshore in the Bay of Campeche. This complex comprises four major fields: Akal (by far the largest), Nohoch, Chac and Kutz. The reservoirs are formed from carbonate breccia of Late Cretaceous age, the rubble from the asteroid impact that created the Chicxulub Crater. The recently discovered Sihil field (1–15,000 million barrels) contains light oil in Jurassic strata below the other reservoirs and is generally referred to as a separate field, although its development will obviously benefit from the infrastructure already in place above it. Cantarell's oil production peaked in 2004 and has declined in subsequent years, with further decline expected in the future.

Aerial Views of the Cantarell Complex
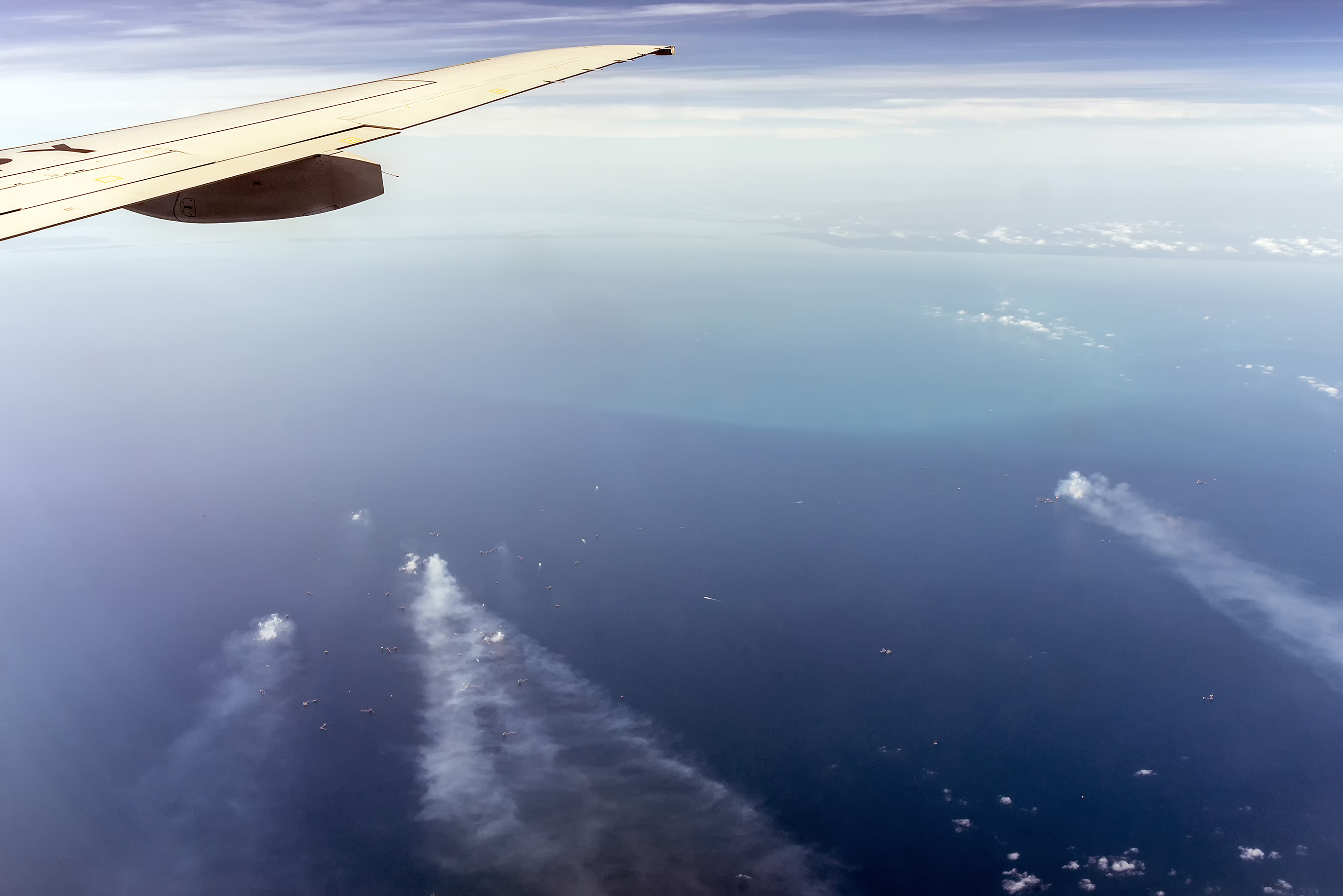
Flight over Cantarell, Yucatan at the horizon

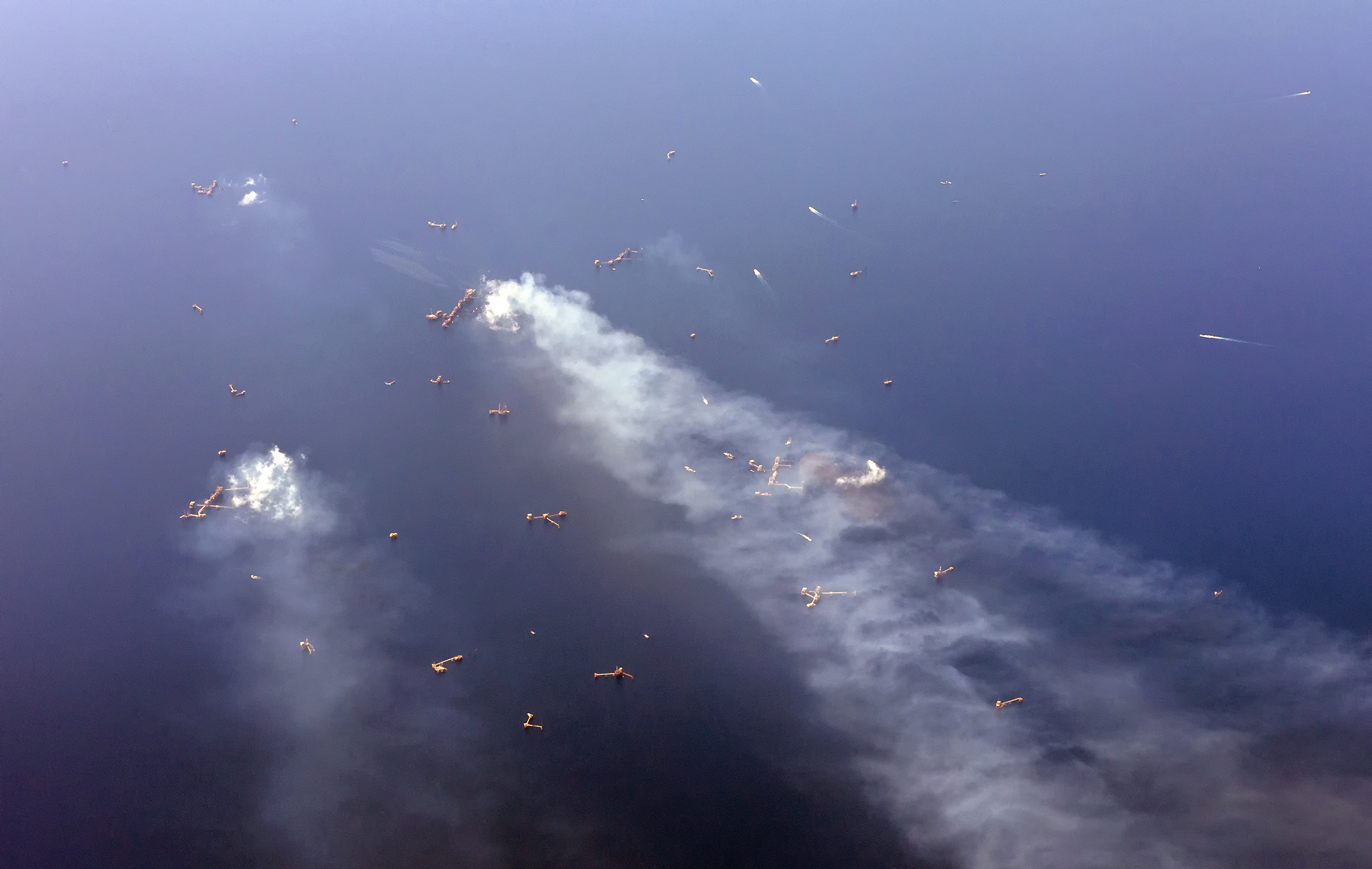
Cluster of production platforms

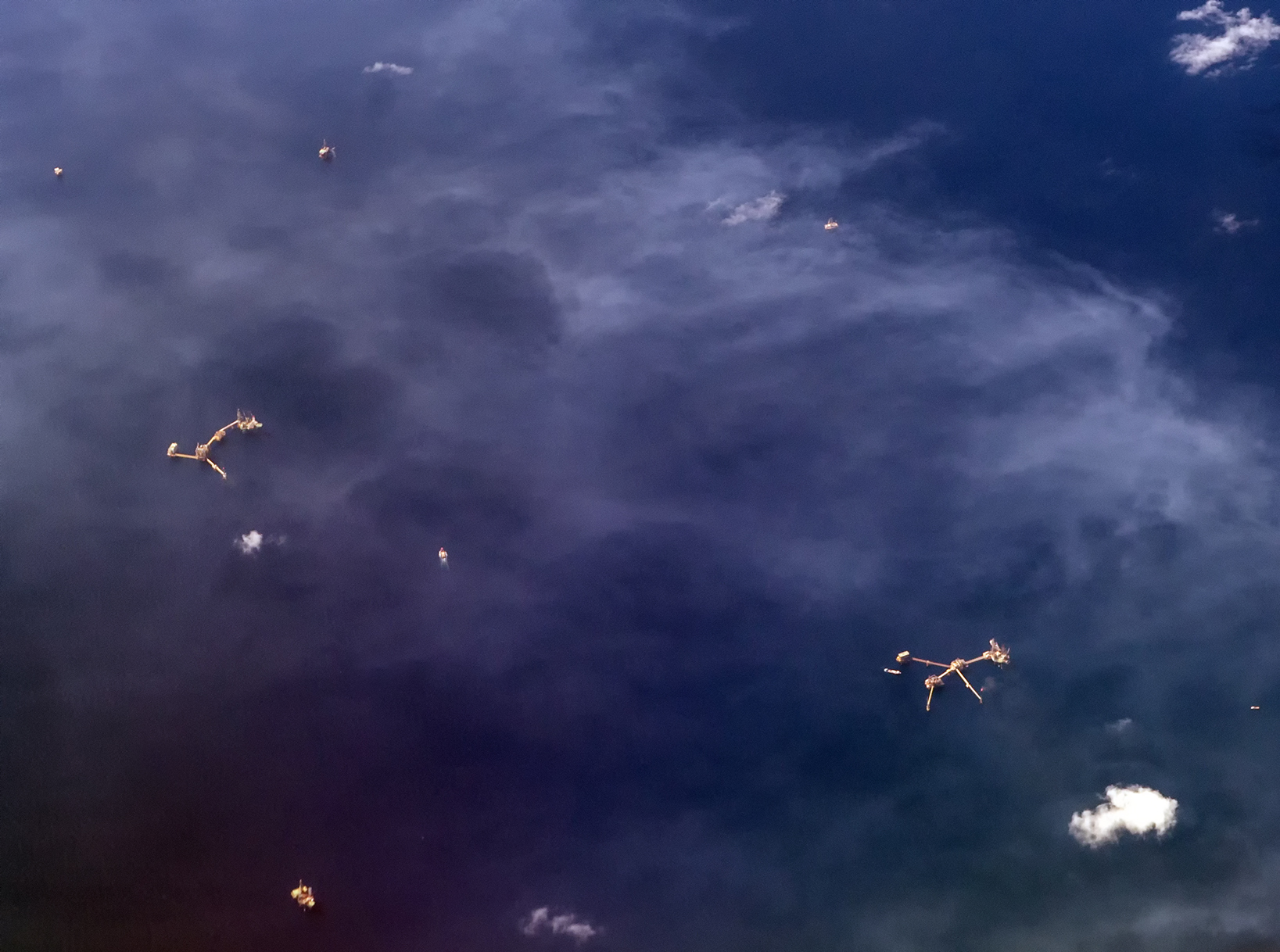
Closeup of two major platforms

== Geology ==
The Chicxulub impactor produced the Chicxulub crater and subsequent carbonate-debris breccia, which became the oil reservoir for the fields around Villahermosa and the Bay of Campeche where the Cantarell Complex is located. The porosity is 8%-12% in the reservoir at a depth of about 1500 m, which grades from being coarse-grained to fine-grained, called Unit 1 and 2 respectively, and overlain by a seal of shaly ejecta-rich layer called Unit 3.

Following impact, the carbonate platform collapsed, depositing the coarse breccias, which were then overlain mixed and overlain by finer breccias from the consequent tsunamis. Folding occurred in the early Miocene to Pliocene and the compression forced up Cretaceous and Upper Jurassic blocks forming the Structural trap in which hydrocarbons migrated in the Miocene. There are four blocks in the Cantarell Complex, Akal, Nohoch, Chac and Kutz with the Akal block underlain by a fifth block, Sihil, where oil was discovered in 1998.

== Production history ==
Year	Crude oil production, kb/d	Natural gas production, Mft^{3}/d
2003	2122.8	769.7
2004	2136.4	773.4
2005	2035.3	759.2
2006	1800.9	715.5
2007	1490.5	941.2
2008	1039.5	1,626.4
2009	684.8	1,452.5
2010	558.0	1,248.7
2011	500.7	1,074.7
2012	454.1	1,004.2
2013	439.8	1,007.1
2014	374.9	1,120.9
2015	273.4	1,277.1
2016	215.8	1,184.9
2017	176.0	1,133.4
2018	161.2	1151.1
2019	159.3	1245.7
2020	161.2	1163.6
2021	160.9	1055.0
2022	158.3	860.4
2023	163.8	888.2
2024	141.5	618.6

By 1981, the Cantarell complex was producing 1.16 million barrels per day (180,000 m^{3}/d). However, the production rate dropped to 1 million barrels per day (160,000 m^{3}/d) in 1995. The nitrogen injection project, including the largest nitrogen plant in the world, installed onshore at Atasta Campeche, started operating in 2000, and it increased the production rate to 1.6 million barrels per day (250,000 m^{3}/d), to 1.9 million barrels per day (300,000 m^{3}/d) in 2002 and to 2.1 million barrels per day (330,000 m^{3}/d) of output in 2003, which ranked Cantarell the second fastest producing oil field in the world behind Ghawar Field in Saudi Arabia. However, Cantarell had much smaller oil reserves than Ghawar, so production began to decline rapidly in the second half of the decade. Unfortunately, the nitrogen has migrated into the gas, lowering its heating value and thus, economic value, and soon will require treatment to remove the nitrogen from the gas, to be able to use the gas as a fuel.

Luis Ramírez Corzo, head of PEMEX's exploration and production division, announced on August 12, 2004, that the actual oil output from Cantarell was forecast to decline steeply from 2006 onwards, at a rate of 14% per year. In March 2006 it was reported that Cantarell had already peaked, with a second year of declining production in 2005. For 2006, the field's output declined by 13.1%, according to Jesús Federico Reyes Heroles, the director-general of PEMEX.

In July 2008, the daily production rate fell sharply by 36% to 973,668 barrels per day (155,000 m^{3}/d) from 1.526 million barrels per day (243×10^{3} m^{3}/d) a year earlier. Analysts theorize that this rapid decline is a result of production enhancement techniques causing faster short-term oil extraction at the expense of field longevity. By January 2009, oil production at Cantarell had fallen to 772,000 barrels per day (123,000 m^{3}/d), a drop in production of 38% for the year, resulting in a drop in total Mexican oil production of 9.2%, the fifth year in a row of declining Mexican production.

In 2008, Pemex expected Cantarell's decline to continue to 2012 and eventually stabilizing at an output level of around 500,000 barrels per day (80,000 m^{3}/d). By September 2009 this figure was already achieved, marking one of the most dramatic declines ever seen in the oil industry. Production was now expected to stabilize at 400,000 barrels per day (60,000 m^{3}/d). However the production declined to 408,000 barrels per day (60,000 m^{3}/d) by April 2012. The shortfall had a negative effect on Mexico's annual government budget and sovereign-credit rating. Production continued to decline and production was at 340,000 barrels per day in June 2014. Pemex planned to spend 6 billion US dollars until 2017 to stop the decline and maintain production level at around 325,000 barrels per day for another decade. Production continued to decline, reaching 159,300 barrels per day in 2019.

In order to try to maintain heavy crude production in the Bay of Campeche, PEMEX was focusing its efforts on the development of the Ku-Maloob-Zaap complex in an adjacent area, which can be connected to the existing facilities of Cantarell. Ku-Maloob-Zaap complex is expected to produce 0.8 million barrels per day (130,000 m^{3}/d) by the end of decade. In 2009, Ku-Maloob-Zaap replaced Cantarell as Mexico's most productive oil field.

== See also ==
- List of oil fields
- Petroleum industry in Mexico
