= Upper Zakum oil field =

Oil field in the United Arab Emirates

Upper Zakum Oil Field
- Location within United Arab Emirates Location within Persian Gulf
- Country: United Arab Emirates
- Region: Persian Gulf
- Offshore/onshore: offshore
- Coordinates: 24.853°N 53.662°E
- Operator: Abu Dhabi National Oil Company

Field history
- Discovery: 1963
- Start of production: 1977

Production
- Current production of oil: 500,000 barrels per day (~2.5×10^{7} t/a)
- Estimated oil in place: 6711 million tonnes (~ 8×10^{9} m^{3} or 50000 million bbl)

The Upper Zakum Oil Field Arabic: حقل زاكوم العلوي is an oil field 84 km northwest of Abu Dhabi Islands. It was discovered in 1963 and developed by Abu Dhabi Marine Areas Ltd., a joint venture between BP and Compagnie Française des Pétroles (later Total). The oil field is owned by Abu Dhabi National Oil Company and operated as part of ADNOC Offshore, formerly ZADCO.

The current 40% foreign interest is split between ExxonMobil which has a 28 percent stake, with Japan Oil Developing Co (Jodco) holding 12 percent.

The total oil in place in the Zakum oil fields, including the Lower Zakum oil field, is around 50 billion barrels (6.7 billion tonnes), and production is centered on 500,000 barrels per day (79,000 m^{3}/d). There is a project close to completion to increase production to 750,000 bbl/day from Upper Zakum.

Upper Zakum and Lower Zakum together are the second largest offshore oilfield and the fourth largest oilfield in the world.
