= Fyodorovskoye Field =

Russian oil field

Coordinates: 61°39′27″N 73°38′56″E

Fyodorovskoye is an oil field located in the Surgutsky District in the Khanty-Mansi Autonomous Okrug in the West Siberian petroleum basin of Russia. Discovered in 1971, it has been among Russia's top 10 oil fields since oil production commenced in 1974. The oil field is owned and operated by Fyodorovneft, a subsidiary of Surgutneftegas, a Russian oil and gas company.

== Geology ==
Fyodorovskoye lies in the West Siberian basin, which at approximately 2.2 million square kilometers in size, is the largest petroleum basin in the world. The swampy plain is bordered by the Kara Sea to the north, the Ural Mountains to the west, the Yenisei River to the east, and the Central Kazakhstan and Altai-Sayan geological folds to the south.

== History ==
Dating back to the time of the Soviet Union, Fyodorovskoye was discovered in 1971 and put on stream in 1974. Surgutneftegas, the Russian oil and gas company, created a subsidiary, Fyodorovneft, to own and operate the oil field.

== Production ==
Fyodorovskoye production started in 1974 and hit its apex of 692,000 barrels of oil equivalent in 1983. However, due to water breakthrough into the field and a lack of investment, production has since sharply declined. Nonetheless, it still ranks among the top 10 highest-producing oil fields in Russia. The Western Siberian basin, in which the oil field lies, accounts for three-quarters of Russia's oil production.

== Reserves ==
One source estimates the total past, present, and future reserves of Fyodorovskoye are 11 billion barrels of oil equivalent. The Western Siberian basin, in which the oil field lies, accounts for two-thirds of Russia's oil reserves.

== See also ==
- Petroleum industry in Russia
