= Samotlor Field =

Russian oilfield

Samotlor field
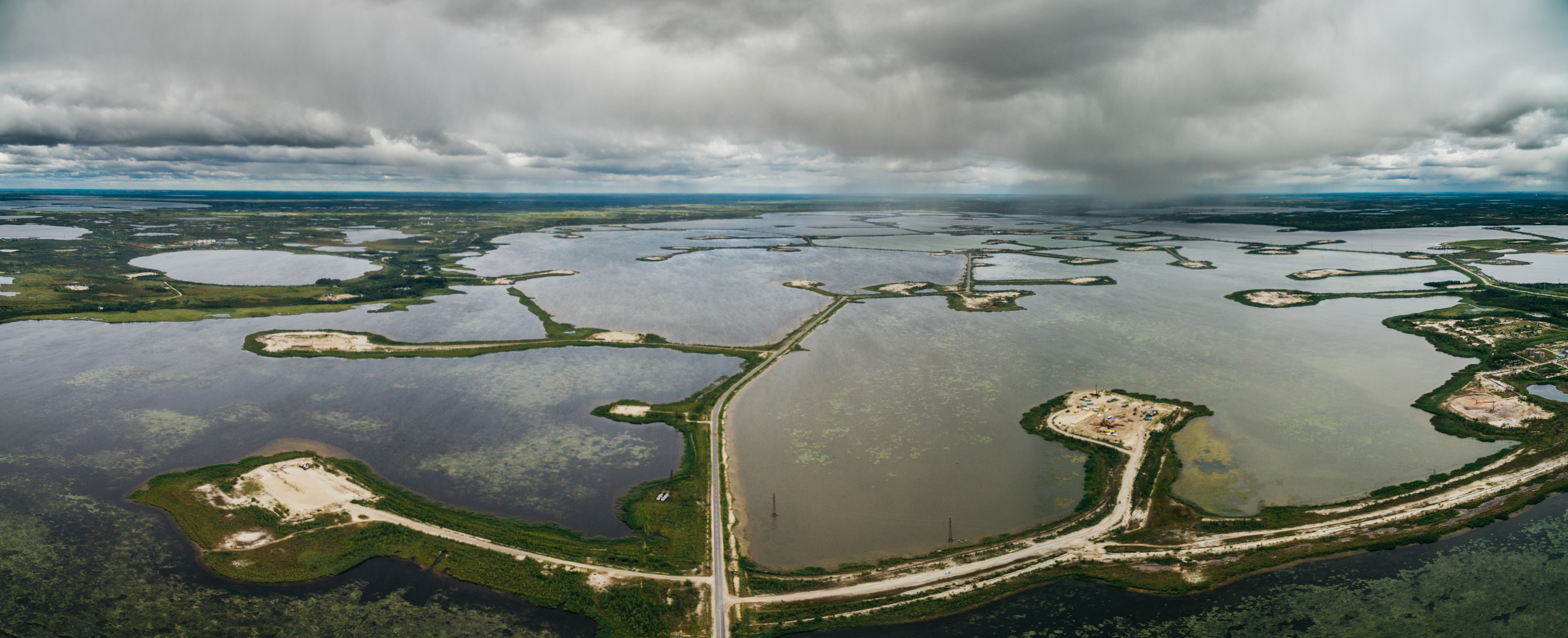
- Well sites made of sand, aerial photography, August 2018.

- Location within Russia
- Country: Russia
- Region: Khanty–Mansi Autonomous Okrug, Tyumen Oblast
- Location: Lake Samotlor, Nizhnevartovsk district,
- Offshore/onshore: onshore
- Coordinates: 61°7′N 76°45′E
- Operator: Samotlorneftegaz
- Partner: Rosneft

Field history
- Discovery: 1965
- Start of development: 1967
- Start of production: 1969
- Peak year: 1980

Production
- Current production of oil: 332,782 barrels per day (~1.658×10^{7} t/a)
- Year of current production of oil: 2013
- Estimated oil in place: 4,000 million barrels (~5.5×10^{8} t)
- Producing formations: Cretaceous ages

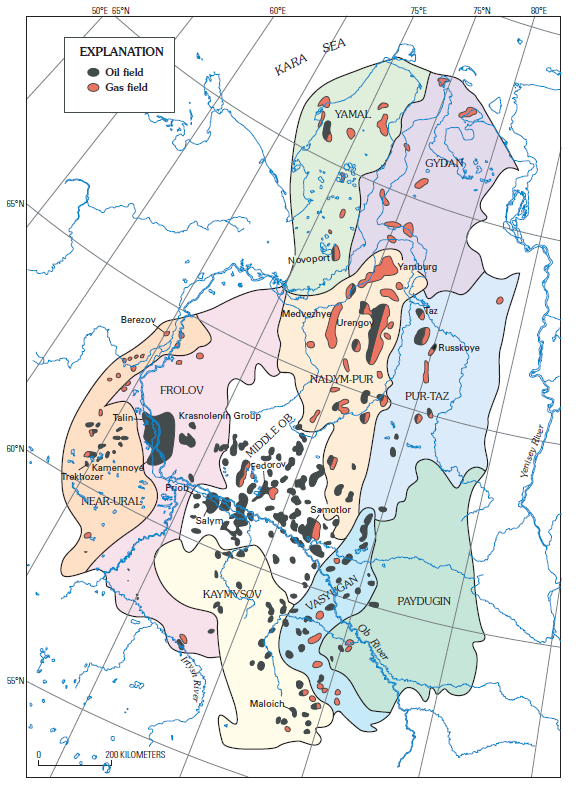
West Siberian petroleum basin oil and gas fields

Samotlor Field is the largest oil field of Russia and the sixth largest in the world, owned and operated by Rosneft. The field is located at Lake Samotlor in Nizhnevartovsk district, Khanty–Mansi Autonomous Okrug, Tyumen Oblast. It covers 1,752 square kilometres (676 sq mi).

== History ==
The field was discovered in 1965. Development started in 1967 and first oil was produced in 1969. Discovery of this field had changed Nizhnevartovsk from a small nearby village into a busy oil city as Samotlor used to be the most important oil production base of the Soviet Union. After breakup of the Soviet Union the field was owned by Samotlorneftgaz and TNK-Nizhnevartovsk, which later formed TNK-BP.

Over the all development period a total of 2,086 well clusters (containing more than 17,000 wells) have been built and about 2.6 billion tons of oil has been produced. The peak production occurred in 1980 when Samotlor produced 158.9 million tons of oil (7 Mbbl/d or 1.1×10^{6} m^{3}/d). The production has been in decline ever since, although according to TNK-BP the field production has stabilized over the past last years after.

== Reserves ==
The in-place oil reserves of the Samotlor field were equal to 55 billion barrels (8.7×10^{9} m^{3}) and as of 2009 estimated at 1 billion barrels (160×10^{6} m^{3}). The proven reserves are approximately 44 billion barrels (7.0×10^{9} m^{3}). The field is 80% depleted with water-cut up to 90%.

At the end of the 1990s, production rate dropped to 300,000 barrels per day (48,000 m^{3}/d). However, through an aggressive exploration program and application of cutting-edge technologies TNK-BP had raised production up to 750,000 barrels per day (119,000 m^{3}/d). Up to 2012, TNK-BP plans to invest US$1 billion per year for maintaining oil production in it at the level of 30 million tons per year.

Samotlor field is considered depleted, with its high water-cut and a significant portion of its original reserves already extracted, though new development programs are underway to access remaining hard-to-recover resources. Peak production was in 1980, and by 2024, it was estimated that the field had already recovered about 90% of its total recoverable reserves.

== In fiction ==
The oil processing plant in Nizhnevartovsk is the scene of (but referred to by location rather than directly by name) the beginning of Tom Clancy's 1986 novel Red Storm Rising.

== See also ==
- Petroleum industry in Russia

== Sources ==
- Kramer, Andrew E. "Mapmakers and Mythmakers: Russian Disinformation Practices Obscure Even Today's Oil Fields," New York Times (1 December 2005): C1.
