= Natural gas in Iran =

Overview of proven natural gas reserves in Iran

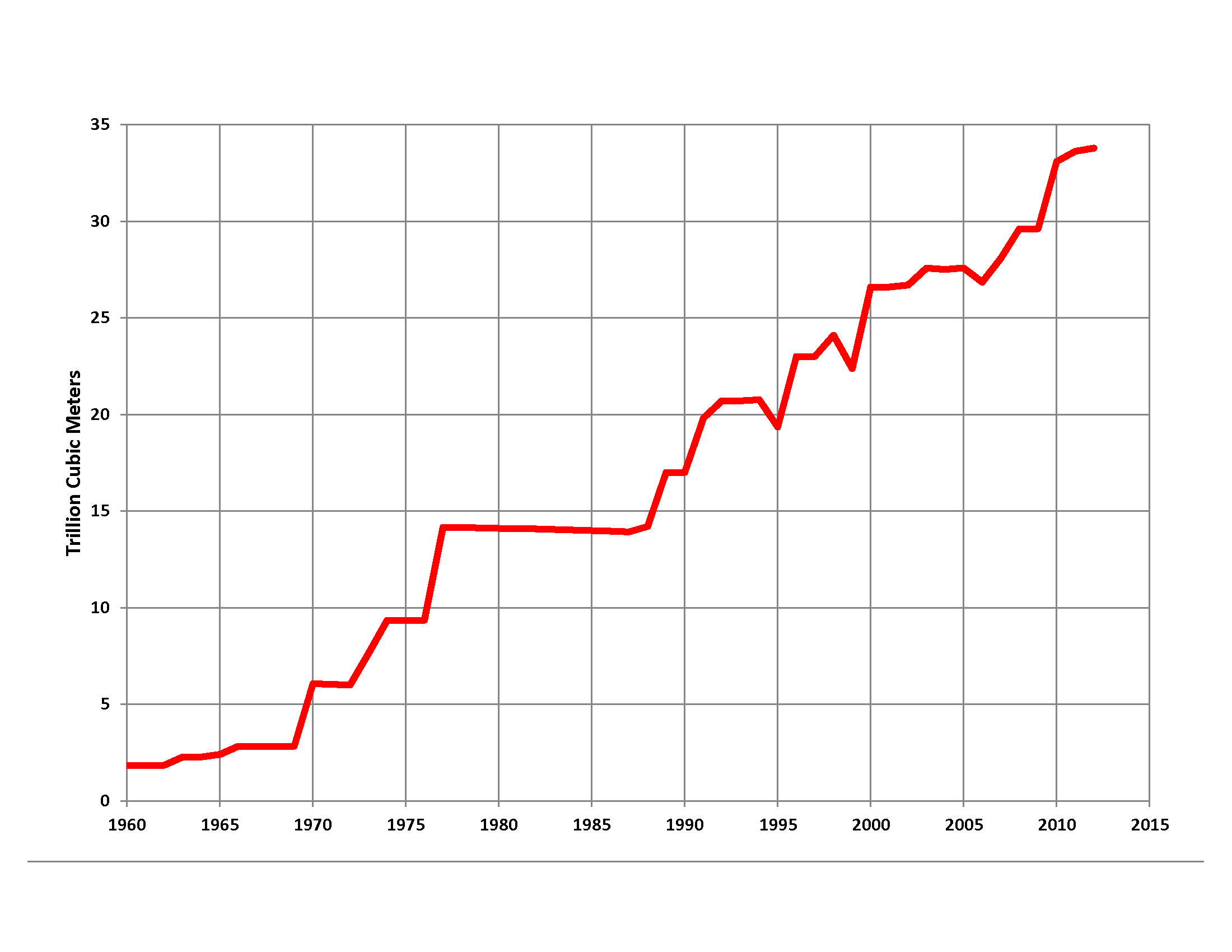
Proved natural gas reserves in Iran (data from OPEC)

Countries by natural gas proven reserves (2018), based on data from The World Factbook. Iran has the world's second largest reserves after Russia

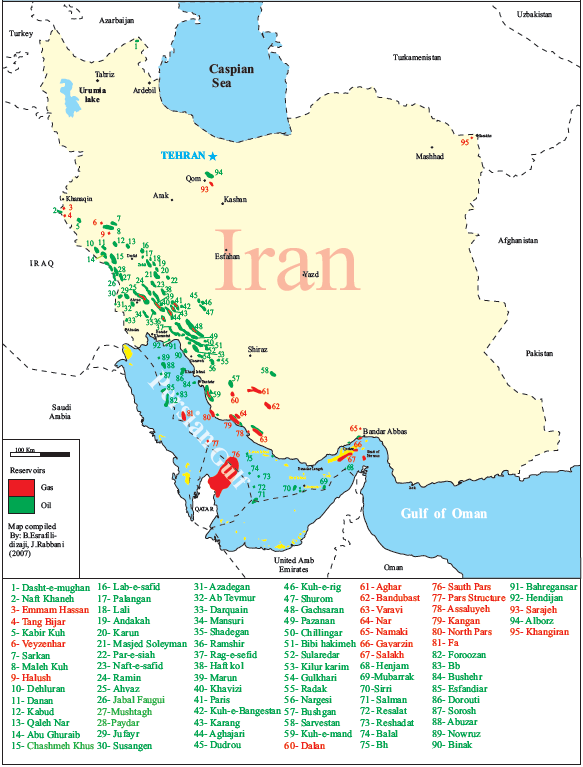
Iran Gas Fields Location Map

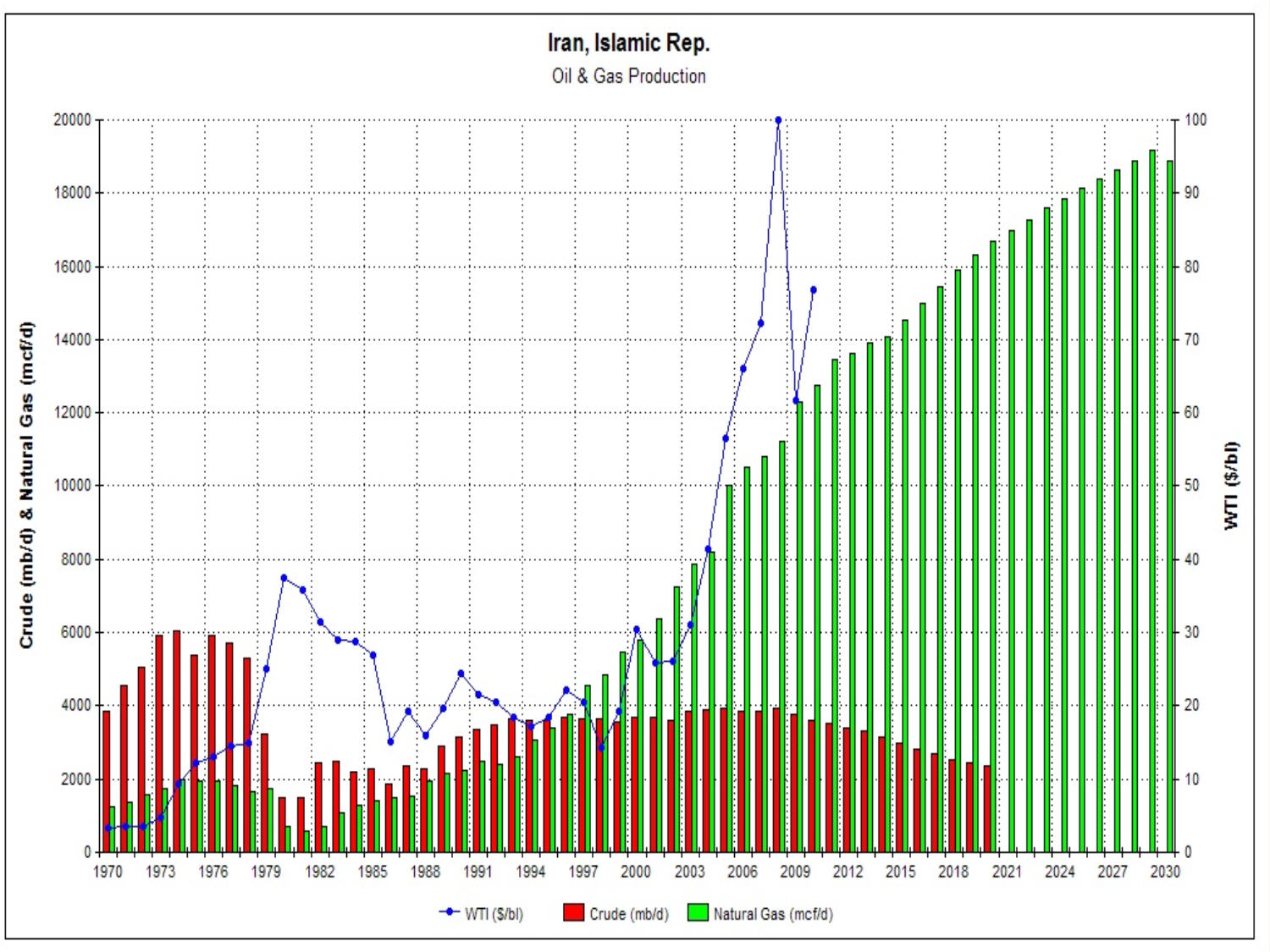
Iran's oil & gas production (1970–2030)

According to the Iran Petroleum Ministry, the proved natural gas reserves of Iran are about 1,201 trillion cubic feet (34.0 trillion cubic metres) or about 17.8% of world's total reserves, of which 33% are as associated gas and 67% is in non associated gas fields. It has the world's second largest reserves after Russia. As it takes approximately 5,850 cubic feet (166 m^{3}) of gas to equal the energy content of 1-barrel (0.16 m^{3}) of oil, Iran's gas reserves represent the equivalent of about 205 billion barrels (3.26×10^{10} m^{3}) of oil.

The US Energy Information Administration estimated Iran's proved gas reserves as of 2016 to be 1,201 trillion cubic feet (34.0 trillion cubic metres), rendering it second in the world.

Iran is one of the most hydrocarbon-rich areas in the world. Since the nation's first oil well in 1908, 145 hydrocarbon fields and 297 oil and gas reservoirs have been discovered in Iran, with many fields having multiple pay zones. A total of 102 fields are oil and the remaining 43 are gas, and there are 205 oil reservoirs and 92 natural gas reservoirs. According to Iran Energy Balance Sheet (2009, in Persian), 78 of these fields are currently active, with 62 onshore and 16 offshore, leaving 67 fields inactive at present. Some 23 hydrocarbon fields lie in border areas and are shared between Iran and adjacent countries, including Kuwait, Iraq, Qatar, Bahrain, UAE, Saudi Arabia and Turkmenistan.

The Permo-Triassic successions (the Dehram group in Iran and its lateral equivalent, the Khuff formation), are major gas-producing intervals in these basins. The supergiant North Dome/South Pars field alone is estimated to hold about 19% of the world's total gas reserves, producing gas and condensate from these intervals.

Iran still has huge potential for new significant gas discoveries: areas such as Caspian Sea, North East, Central Kavir and especially areas starting from Aghar and Dalan gas fields in Fars province up to the Strait of Hormuz and Central Persian Gulf have considerable potential for undiscovered gas. According to Exploration Directorate of NIOC, there are about 150 unexplored anticlines in Iran.

In 1998, the US Geological Survey estimated Iran's undiscovered gas resources to be in the range of 226 to 820 trillion cubic feet, with a probability-weighted average of 465 trillion cubic feet (13.2 trillion cubic metres)

In January 2008, Iranian Minister of Petroleum Gholam-Hossein Nozari said, "NIOC has a target of producing one billion cubic meters of gas per day.

Composition of Iranian Natural Gas Reserves
Onshore Associated	13.5%
Onshore Non-Associated	18.4%
Offshore Associated	1%
Offshore Non-Associated	67.1%

Iran's ten biggest non-associated gas fields:

Iran's ten biggest Non-Associated Gas Fields.
Field	Gas in place	Recoverable reserve
South Pars	500×10^{12} cu ft (14,000 km^{3})	360×10^{12} cu ft (10,000 km^{3})
Kish	66×10^{12} cu ft (1,900 km^{3})	50×10^{12} cu ft (1,400 km^{3})
North Pars	60×10^{12} cu ft (1,700 km^{3})	47×10^{12} cu ft (1,300 km^{3})
Golshan	55×10^{12} cu ft (1,600 km^{3})	45×10^{12} cu ft (1,300 km^{3}) to 25×10^{12} cu ft (710 km^{3})
Tabnak	NA	21.2×10^{12} cu ft (600 km^{3})
Kangan	NA	20.1×10^{12} cu ft (570 km^{3})
Khangiran	NA	16.9×10^{12} cu ft (480 km^{3})
Nar	NA	13×10^{12} cu ft (370 km^{3})
Aghar	NA	11.6×10^{12} cu ft (330 km^{3})
Farsi (B-Structure)	NA	11×10^{12} cu ft (310 km^{3}) – 22×10^{12} cu ft (620 km^{3})

There are also several discovered gas fields in Iran which hold low portion of CH_{4} and high portion of N_{2}. These gas fields are Kabir Kuh, Milatun, Samand, Holeylan and Ahmadi. The Kabir Kuh gas field located in Lurestan province has 21 trillion cubic feet (590 billion cubic metres) of gas in place. The field gas consists of N_{2} 64.33%, CH_{4} 33.64%, CO_{2} 2% and He 0.03%.

NIOC Natural Gas Discoveries Since 1995.
Field's Name	Gas in Place		Recoverable Gas Reserve	
Field's Name	Trillion cubic feet	Billion cubic meters	Trillion cubic feet	Billion cubic meters
Kish	66	1,900	50	1,400
Sardar-e Jangal	50	1,400	NA	
Tabnak	30	850	NA	
Forouz	24.7	700	NA	
Madar	17.5	500	NA	
Farsi (B-Structure)	11–23	310–650	NA	
Halegan	12.4	350	9	250
Ghir (Sefid Zakhur)	11.4	320	8.5	240
Yadavaran-Gas Layer	9.75	276	NA	
Lavan	9.1	260	NA	
Balal-Dahroum Formation	8.8	250	NA	
Homa	7.6	220	NA	
Sefid-Baghon	6.3	180	4.45	126
Marun Gas Layer	6.2	180	NA	
Gardan	5.7	160	NA	
Day	4.4	120	NA	
Binak Gas Layer	3.5	99	NA	
Karanj Gas Layer	2.9	82	NA	
BiBi hakime Gas Layer	2.4	68	NA	
Tous	2.19	62	1.6	45
Zireh	1	28	NA	
Kuh-e-Asmari(Masjed Soleiman)	1	28	0.739	20.9
Arash	0.79	22	NA	
Kheyr Abad	0.17	4.8	NA	
Total	277.3	7,850	NA	

Iran's proven oil and gas reserves are 137 billion barrels (2.18×10^{10} m^{3}) (10% of world's total) and 41.14 trillion cubic meters (15% of world's total) respectively, which give it a unique status in the global energy supply. Iran also owns 50% of the offshore gas field of Rhum in the North Sea, which is Britain's largest untapped gas field.

== Development ==
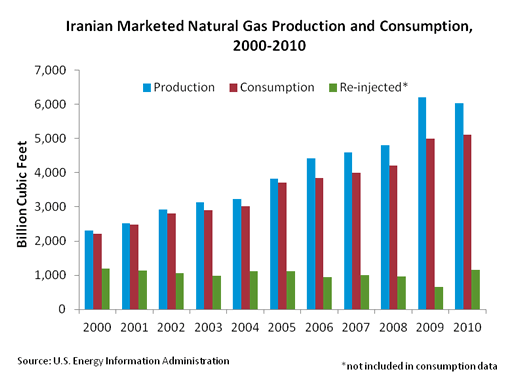
Iranian marketed natural gas production and consumption (2000–2010)

At present, Iran is producing only a small share of its gas reserves, about 5.5 trillion cubic feet (160 billion cubic metres) per year. This means that Iran is one of the few countries capable of supplying much larger amounts of natural gas in the future. Iran's overall gas exports in 2009/10 reached a record high of 6.8 billion cubic meters, increasing 44% over the previous year.

Iran's net export of gas in 2010 was 1.57 billion cubic metres. In 2010, Iran's exports and imports of natural gas were 8.42 and 6.85 billion cubic metres respectively. In 2010, Iran exported 0.4, 0.25, and 7.77 billion cubic metres of gas to Armenia, Azerbaijan and Turkey respectively. In terms of imports, Iran has received 0.35 and 6.5 billion cubic metres from Azerbaijan and Turkmenistan respectively. Iran has approximately 29.6 trillion cubic meters of proven gas reserves which accounts for 16% of the world's total reserves. This places Iran behind Russia with the second largest gas reserves worldwide. In 2009, Iran's natural gas production stood at 116 billion cubic metres. In 2010, this number rose to 138.5 billion cubic metres which shows a 19% increase. Most of Iran's gas is consumed domestically and has been increasing at an average annual rate of 12% for the past 15 years.

Iran plans to invest $15 billion a year to expand its annual gas output capacity to 300 billion cubic metres (11 trillion cubic feet) by 2014, from 170 billion in 2009. It will invest $50 billion from 2010 until 2020 on LNG projects. Iran plans to export 8 million tons of LNG by 2012. The country also aims to increase natural gas exports by fivefold to 60 billion cubic metres (2.1 trillion cubic feet) a year by 2014. Global gas demand is projected to rise between 2 percent and 3 percent a year for the next 20 to 25 years, with India and China the main markets for Iran's gas exports.

A December 2011 report from Iran's Petroleum Minister indicated that a large natural gas reserve was discovered inside Iran's side of the Caspian Sea. These reserves are estimated at 50 trillion cubic feet (1.42 trillion cubic meter).

On 23 August, 2026, Iran stated that it discovered more than 7.5 trillion cubic feet of gas in the vicinity of Fars province.

== See also ==
- International rankings of Iran in Energy
- World's Largest Gas Fields
- Rhum gasfield
- Ferdowsi Gas Field
