= Asaluyeh =

City in Bushehr province, Iran

Asaluyeh عسلويه
- City
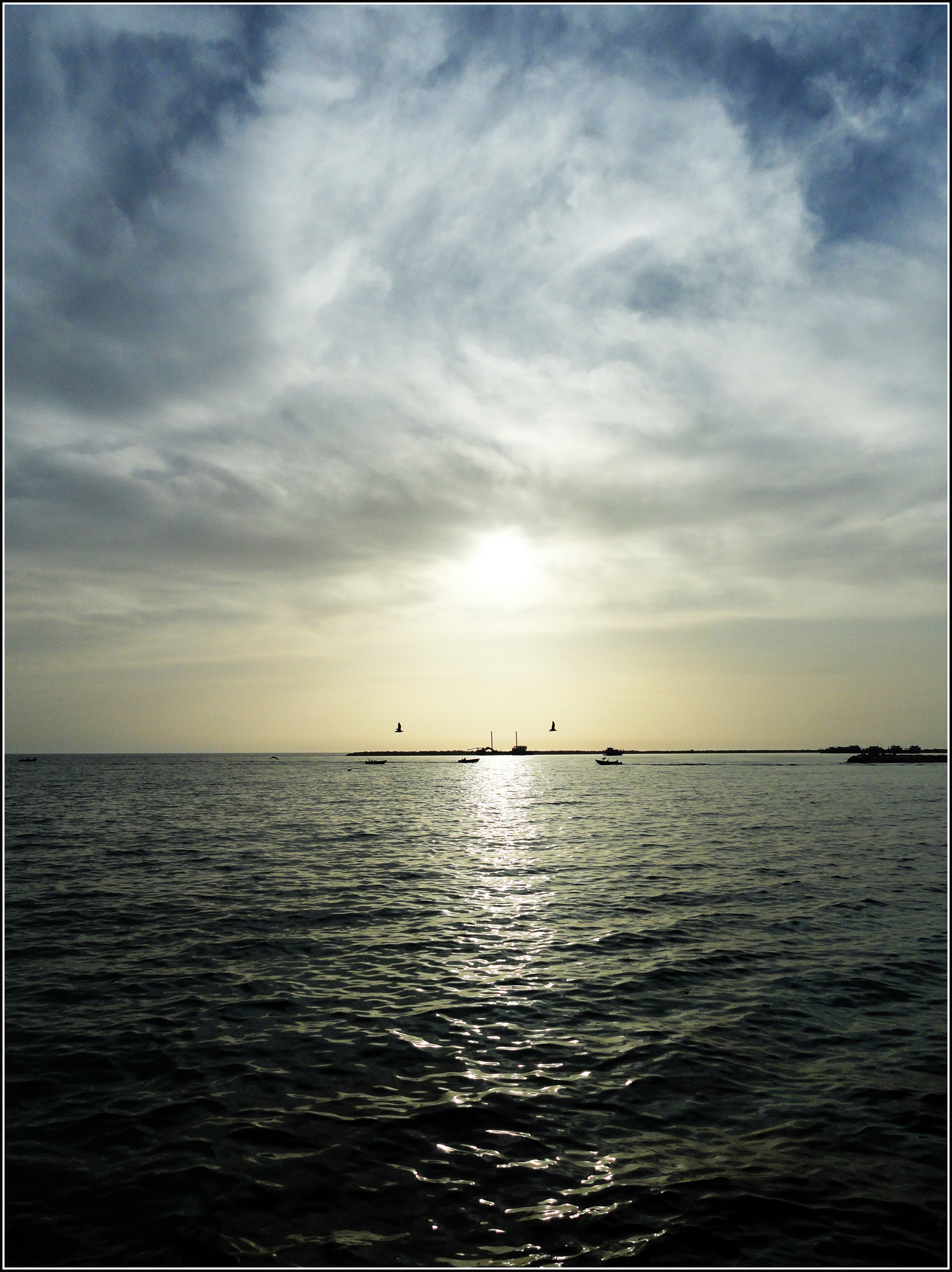

- Location on the Persian Gulf Location in Iran
- Coordinates: 27°28′28″N 52°36′41″E
- Country: Iran
- Province: Bushehr
- County: Asaluyeh
- District: Central
- Established as a city: 2003

Population (2016)
  - Total: 13,557
- Time zone: UTC+3:30 (IRST)

Asaluyeh (Persian: عسلويه) (Note: Also romanized as Asalooyeh, Asalouyeh, Asalūyeh, Assalouyeh, and Assaluyeh; also known as Asaloyeh, Asalu, Asaluye, and sometimes prefixed by Bandar (English: Port). UNCTAD codes: IR YEH, IR PGU, and IR ASA) is a city in the Central District of Asaluyeh County, Bushehr province, Iran, serving as capital of both the county and the district. It is also the administrative center for Asaluyeh Rural District. The village of Asaluyeh was converted to a city in 2003.

== Demographics ==
=== Population ===
At the time of the 2006 National Census, the city's population was 4,746 in 875 households, when it was capital of the former Asaluyeh District in Kangan County. The following census in 2011 counted 7,884 people in 1,709 households. The 2016 census measured the population of the city as 13,557 people in 3,324 households, by which time the district had been separated from the county in the establishment of Asaluyeh County. Asaluyeh was transferred to the new Central District as the county's capital.

On the shore of the Persian Gulf some 270 km SE of the provincial capital of Bushehr, it is best known as the site for the land based facilities of the huge PSEEZ (Pars Special Energy Economic Zone) project. The city itself is of minor significance, although it is common practice to refer to PSEEZ (established 1998) and Asaluyeh town collectively as Asaluyeh.

Asaluyeh was chosen as the site of the PSEEZ facilities due to it being the closest land point to the largest natural gas field in the world, the South Pars / North Dome Gas-Condensate field. In addition, an existing airport and direct access to international waters via a deep water port were already present.

== PSEEZ ==
The PSEEZ (Pars Special Energy/Economic Zone) as it is known has been allocated 100 square kilometres of land at Asaluyeh for the various complexes and facilities. The site is a collection of different plants and refineries (known as "phases") and is administered by the PSEEZ agency onsite.

A total of 27 phases are envisaged (12 gas, 15 petrochemical), plus a mix of light and heavy industry, and associated support facilities such as factories and warehouses. The scale of the project is huge. Some 28 refineries and 25 petrochemical complexes are scheduled to be established in Asalouyeh, in southern Bushehr province. Of these, 10 refineries and 7 petrochemical complexes were operational in 2009.

PSEEZ is a workers town – tourism is non-existent. Currently there are no hotels in Asaluyeh, although plans exist to construct a hotel between the airport and the Industrial area. Once completed, the Sadaf International Hotel will consist of 400 rooms in three buildings, on 1 square kilometre of land. A visa is required to enter Iran for most nationalities, and is therefore needed to visit the PSEEZ.

As of August 2005, US$20 billion of foreign money had been invested in PSEEZ since 1997. According to Iran's oil ministry, sales of products from PSEEZ could be as much as $11 billion per year, over 30 years.

Private companies are also constructing a business park and warehouses.

Internet access and telephony facilities are also available via a Tehran based Internet service provider, Pars Online. No other ISP's are present at PSEEZ. In 2010, a large power plant with 1,000 megawatts output was inaugurated in Asalouyeh, aiming to supply electricity to the refineries of South Pars gas field phases 9, 10, 15, 16, 17, and 18.

=== Special economic zone ===
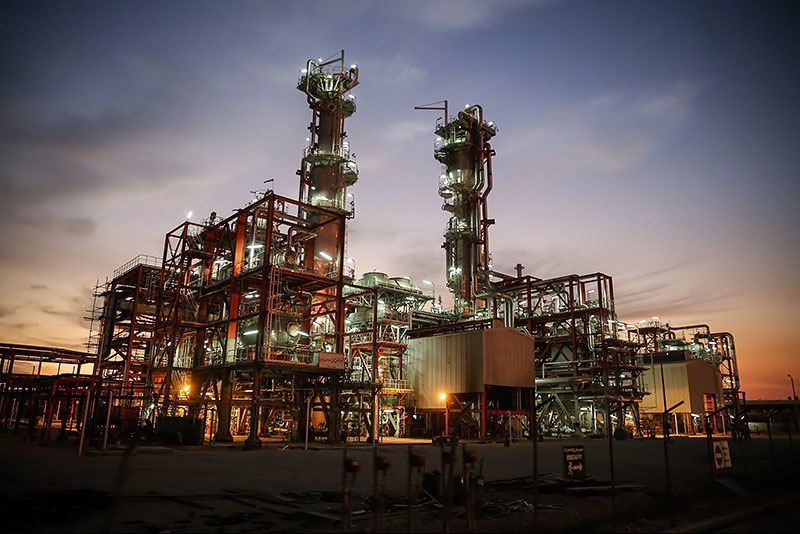
Pars Especial Economic Zone

The Pars Special Economic Energy Zone (PSEEZ) is a special economic zone. PSEEZ was established in 1998 for the utilization of South Pars oil and gas resources. Goods can be brought in duty-free, but cannot leave the PSEEZ and enter the rest of Iran. This is to encourage construction within and development of the PSEEZ. The private sector invested some $1.5 billion in the PSEEZ during the 4 years from 2009. Foreign entities have invested some $36 billion in the Pars Special Economic Energy Zone (PSEEZ) during 10 years.

== Asaluyeh City ==
Asalouyeh city is surrounded by PSEEZ, but is still geographically separate and a few minutes drive from the nearest PSEEZ facility. Before the arrival of PSEEZ, the primary industry was fishing, albeit a very small one. Asalouyeh was a sleepy coastal hamlet, on a narrow strip of land between the Persian Gulf and the Zagros Mountains. Poverty existed in the small town, and it remains.

== Construction ==
The PSEEZ is one of the busiest ongoing construction sites in the world. At any one time up to 60,000 workers are onsite, mostly employed in construction of further gas and petrochemical refineries.

== Airport ==
Construction of a new airport began in 2003. The new Persian Gulf International Airport (IATA code: YEH) opened to traffic in July 2006, replacing the original temporary airport. The volume of construction works for facilities such as runways and aircraft parking area, fence, and patrol roads and access routes to the airport's boulevard, construction of terminals with Jetways to handle 750,000 passengers per year. Control tower and technical buildings as well as supporting buildings such as fire station, meteorology section and so on have been started. Airport characteristics are the runway with length of 4000 meters asphalt paved, width of 45 meters with two 7.5m shoulders along the runway. Aircraft parking area is 330 × 150 Sqm concrete paved. Airport area and peripheral buildings will be constructed on 18 hectares of land. Iranian specialists are undertaking execution works for this airport and installation of the airport's navigation and lighting systems will be performed by foreign companies.

== Pars-Port Complex ==
Logistic Port: Logistic port covers 150 hectares: The western breakwater is 2300 meters long and the eastern breakwater is 1000 meters long. The port basin is 100 hectares with capacity to accept ships of up to 80,000 tons deadweight. The nominal capacity of this port is 10 million tons per year including 1 million tons of granulated sulphur, 3 million of container products and 6 million tons of refinery machinery and parts. This port will have at least 10 berths that can simultaneously accommodate 10 ships and especially for exporting of sulphur, containers loading / unloading as heavy cargo. Water drought along the berths is at least 11 meters and at most 15 meters and the jetty in this port is 2600 meters long. At present, 5 berths are operational. All of the equipment needed by refineries and petrochemical industries were unloaded in this very port and installed on sites.
Petrochemical Port: The petrochemical port with 15 berths and draught of 15 meters can accommodate ships of capacity 80,000 tons deadweight that especially carry gas and petrochemical products. The nominal capacity of this port is 35 million tons per year and it is predicted that 26 million tons of petrochemical products in liquid from will be exported through this port. In accordance with the operations time schedule for the Zone's petrochemical projects, execution operations on this port will be completed in three phases; phase 1 will be completed by 2005 and the project's completion date will be year 2006.

== Plants and refineries ==
Each phase of the South Pars project is estimated to require an average capital expenditure of approximately US$1.5 billion, with most phases led by foreign oil firms in partnership with local companies. The government of President Ahmadinejad, who took office in 2005, has favoured local firms over foreign companies across the energy and other sectors. In 2010, Iran awarded $21 billion in contracts to domestic companies to develop six phases (13, 14, 19, 22, 23 and 24) of the South Pars gas field. Among the domestic participants are Khatam al-Anbiya Construction Headquarters, the engineering arm of the Revolutionary Guard Corps, Oil Industries Engineering and Construction, and Iran Marine Industrial Co. The group also includes Iran Shipbuilding and Offshore Industries Complex Co., Industrial Development and Renovation Organization of Iran, and National Iranian Drilling Co.

The various plants and complexes currently extend for approximately 12 km, with additional facilities under construction. A series of gas flares line the facility, including one particularly large flare with flames reaching nearly 100 meters in height, visible far out at sea. The area also hosts the world's largest aromatic production plant, the Noori Petrochemical Complex, with an annual capacity of 4.2 million tons. Upon completion, revenue from South Pars is expected to exceed current oil exports earnings.

Gas production at South Pars increased by nearly 30 percent between March 2009 and March 2010. The field's reserves are estimated at 14 trillion cubic meters of gas and 18 billion barrels (2.9×10^{9} m^{3}) of gas condensates. Production at South Pars gas field is projected to reach 175 million cubic meters per day in 2012.

=== Project phases ===
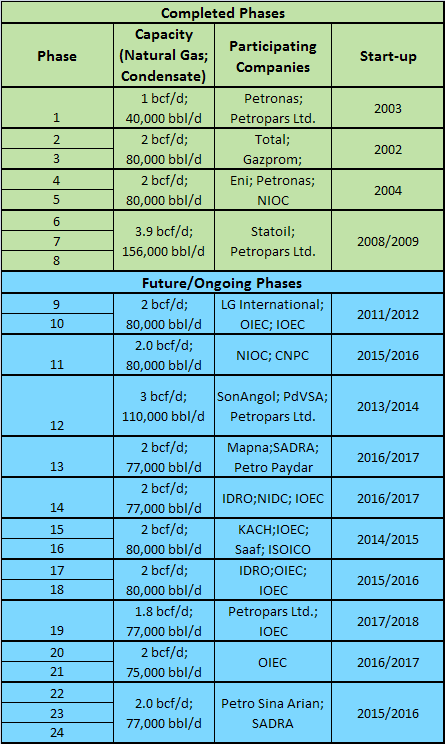
South Pars construction phases.

- Phase 1 was developed by Petropars to produce 1 billion cubic feet (28 million cubic metres) per day of natural gas, 40,000 barrels (6,400 m^{3}) per day of condensate, 1500 tons of LPG per day plus 200 tons of sulfur per day.
- Phases 2 and 3 were developed by a consortium of Total S.A., Petronas, and Gazprom to produce 2 billion ft^{3} (57 million m^{3}) per day of natural gas, 80,000 barrels (13,000 m^{3}) per day of condensate, 3000 tons of LPG per day plus 400 tons of sulfur per day. It came online in March 2003.
- Phases 4 and 5 were developed by Eni and Petropars, to produce 2 billion ft^{3} (57 million m^{3}) per day of rich natural gas, 75 million ft^{3} (2.1 million m^{3}) per day of ethane, 80,000 barrels (13,000 m^{3}) per day of condensate, 3000 tons of LPG per day plus 400 tons of sulfur per day.
- Phases 6 to 8 are gbeing developed by Petropars and Statoil to produce lean gas for re-injection into the Aghajari oilfield, and heavy gas and condensate for export. It involves construction of three offshore platforms in addition to the land-based facilities. Statoil is developing the offshore platforms while Petropars is developing the land based facilities. A 31-inch (790 mm) pipe will be laid from each platform to the coast. These phases will produce 3 billion cubic feet (85,000,000 m^{3}) per day of natural gas, 70 million ft^{3} (2.0 million m^{3}) per day of ethane, 120,000 barrels (19,000 m^{3}) per day of condensate, 4500 Tons of LPG per day plus 600 tons of sulfur per day.
- Phases 9 and 10 were assigned to a consortium of Oil Industrial Engineering and Construction Company (OIEC) and LG Company. These phases will produce 2 billion ft^{3} (57 million m^{3}) per day of natural gas, 75 million ft^{3} (2.1 million m^{3}) per day of ethane, 80,000 barrels (13,000 m^{3}) per day of condensate, 3000 tons of LPG per day plus 400 tons of sulfur per day. Phases 9 & 10 were inaugurated by President Ahmadinejad in March 2009.
- Phases 11 will produce LNG through the Pars LNG project. The project was awarded to China National Petroleum Corporation in 2010 after that France's Total S.A. was excluded from the project by Iran.
- Phases 12 development begin carried out by Petropars as a LNG project. This phase will produce 2.5 billion cubic feet (71,000,000 m^{3}) per day of rich natural gas, 75 million ft^{3} (2.1 million m^{3}) per day of ethane, 80,000 barrels (13,000 m^{3}) per day of condensate, 3000 tons of LPG per day plus 400 tons of sulfur per day. Venezuela's state-owned oil company Petroleos de Venezuela S.A. (PDVSA) will finance 10 percent of the 7.8-billion-dollar project. Angola's Sonangol Group has also been awarded a 20 percent stake in phase 12 project.
- Phase 13 and 14 development will be for Persian LNG production. Development was awarded to an Iranian company (Khatam-ol-Osea) for $5 billion. The Iranian Khatam-ol-Osea Consortium is made up of several large Iranian companies, namely Khatam al-Anbiya Construction Headquarters Construction Headquarters, Oil Industries Engineering & Construction (OIEC), SADRA, ISOICO, IDRO, and NIDC. The contract to develop phase 13 was signed with a consortium comprising Mapna, SADRA, and Petro Pidar Iranian companies and the phase 14 with another consortia consisting of Industrial Development and Renovation Organization (IDRO), National Iranian Drilling Company (NIDC) and Iranian Offshore Engineering and Construction Company (IOEC). Royal Dutch Shell and Repsol had been originally awarded phases 13 and 14 but were left out of the project by Iran due to their repeated delays.
- Phases 15 and 16 development was awarded to Khatam al-Anbiya Construction Headquarters. These phases will produce 2 billion ft^{3} (57 million m^{3}) per day of natural gas, 75 million ft^{3} (2.1 million m^{3}) per day of ethane, 80,000 barrels (13,000 m^{3}) per day of condensate, 3000 tons of LPG per day plus 400 tons of sulfur per day. In July 2010, the project was transferred to Iran Shipbuilding & Offshore Industries Complex. At that time, the 2 billion dollars project was already 50% complete. Phase 15 & 16 will be completed by March 2012.
- Phases 17 and 18 development was assigned to a consortium of Industrial Project Management of Iran (IPMI), Oil Industrial Engineering and Construction Company (OIEC), Iran Offshore Engineering and Construction (IOEC) and Petropars. These phases will produce 2 billion ft^{3} (57 million m^{3}) per day of natural gas, 75 million ft^{3} (2.1 million m^{3}) per day of ethane, 80,000 barrels (13,000 m^{3}) per day of condensate, 3000 tons of LPG per day plus 400 tons of sulfur per day. Phase 17 & 18 will be completed by March 2012.
- Phase 19 development was awarded to IOEC and Petropars. These phases will produce 2 billion ft^{3} (57 million m^{3}) per day of natural gas, 75 million ft^{3} (2.1 million m^{3}) per day of ethane, 80,000 barrels (13,000 m^{3}) per day of condensate, 3000 tons of LPG per day plus 400 tons of sulfur per day. As it is understood, this phase is defined within phase 1, so it can be regarded as some kind of expansion for phase 1.
- Phases 20 and 21 development was awarded to OIEC. These phases will produce 2 billion ft^{3} (57 million m^{3}) per day of natural gas, 75 million ft^{3} (2.1 million m^{3}) per day of ethane, 80,000 barrels (13,000 m^{3}) per day of condensate, 3000 tons of LPG per day plus 400 tons of sulfur per day. In May 2008, Repsol and Royal Dutch Shell agreed to exchange block 13 with block 20 or 21
- Phases 22, 23 and 24 were awarded to Khatam al-Anbiya Construction Headquarters, Petro Sina Arian, and SADRA and are located in the north-eastern frontier of the field. The aim of phases 22, 23 and 24 development is to produce 42.5 million cubic meters of natural gas, 57,000 barrels (9,100 m^{3}) of gas condensate and 300 tons of sulfur per day. The three phases also are designed to produce 800 thousands of LNG and 750 thousand tons of ethane per year.
- Phases 25 and 26 are in tender.
- Phases 27 and 28 development was assigned to Petropars on an EPC scheme. These phases will produce 2 billion ft^{3} (57 million m^{3}) per day of natural gas, 75 million ft^{3} (2.1 million m^{3}) per day of ethane, 75,000 barrels (11,900 m^{3}) per day of condensate, 3000 tons of LPG per day plus 400 tons of sulfur per day.

== South Pars Gas Field ==
The field is located in the Persian Gulf.

The field is the biggest gas field in the world, shared between Iran and Qatar, which contains 1,800 trillion cubic feet (51,000 km^{3}) gas in place and 56 billion bbl (8.9 billion m^{3}) of condensate in place in both parts.

The South Pars Field is the name of northern part, which is located in Iranian waters and the North Dome is the name of southern part, which is located in Qatari waters. South Pars Field was discovered in 1990 by NIOC.

Production started from the southern extension of the field, the North Dome in 1989, at daily gas production rate of 800 million cubic feet (23 million cubic metres) per day at standard conditions.

Gas production started from South Pars field by commissioning the development phase 2 in December 2002 to produce 1 billion ft^{3} (28 million m^{3}) per day at standard conditions of wet gas.

The field consists of two independent gas-bearing formations, Kangan and Upper Dalan. Each formation is divided into two different reservoir layers, separated by impermeable barriers. Therefore, the field consists of four independent reservoir layers K1, K2, K3, and K4.

Iranian sections contains 500 trillion ft^{3} (14,000 km^{3}) of gas in place and around 360 trillion cubic feet (10,000 km^{3}) of recoverable gas. It covers an area of 1,300 square kilometres (500 mi^{2}) and is located 3 km below the seabed at a water depth of 65 m. The Iranian side accounts for 10% of the world's and 60% of Iran's total gas reserves.

The field is planned to be developed in around 30 phases, each of which will require an initial investment of around $1bn.

== Downstream industries ==
Due to the availability of petrochemicals and their by-products, 10 square kilometres at PSEEZ have been allocated for related industries, such as:

- Resins and adhesives
- Rubber and plastics
- Synthetic fibers and textiles
- Oils
- Fertilizers
- Polymers
- Paints and protective coatings
- Pesticides
- Detergents

== Water supply project ==
Construction of two water desalination plants each with a capacity of 10,000 cubic per day started in March 2005. The project was finished 10 months ahead of its contractual 16 months estimate, making it a landmark in project execution in the region. The creation of a network for transferring water distribution network in different sites is underway.

== Green space and environment ==
In view of the Zone's policy on environmental protection and alleviation of industrial pollutions, first steps have been taken in the form of 1000 hectares of urban green space and 3000 hectares allocated to forestation and expansion of the mangrove trees in the tidal area of the sea.

== Foreign involvement ==
Individual gas and petrochemical plants at Asoluyeh, when constructed, usually involve a partnership with a foreign company. The government of President Ahmadinejad, who came to power in 2005, has favoured local firms over foreign companies in the energy and other sectors. Due to the embargo in place against Iran by the United States, it is mostly European and Asian companies becoming involved.

These include:

- China National Petroleum Corporation
- Daelim
- Eni (formerly known as Agip)
- Gazprom
- Hyundai Engineering and Construction (with Linde Group)
- Japan Gasoline Company (JGC) – involved in the construction of the world's largest gas refinery.
- LG
- Petronas
- Statoil
- Technip
- Total
- Toyo Engineering Corporation (TEC)

However, the US company Halliburton and American Allied International Corporation, have contracts for and business dealing with South Pars via subsidiaries.

Plans for LNG refining and export have been discussed – but it remains to be seen how this will be accomplished, as most LNG refining technology is US based and therefore subject to export control due to US sanctions.

== See also ==
- Ministry of Petroleum of Iran
- National Iranian Gas Company
- National Iranian Oil Company
- National Iranian Petrochemical Company
- Asalouyeh Airport
- South Pars / North Dome Gas-Condensate field
- Economy of Iran
- List of natural gas fields
- International rankings of Iran
- Media related to Asaluyeh at Wikimedia Commons
