= MV Yoraco =

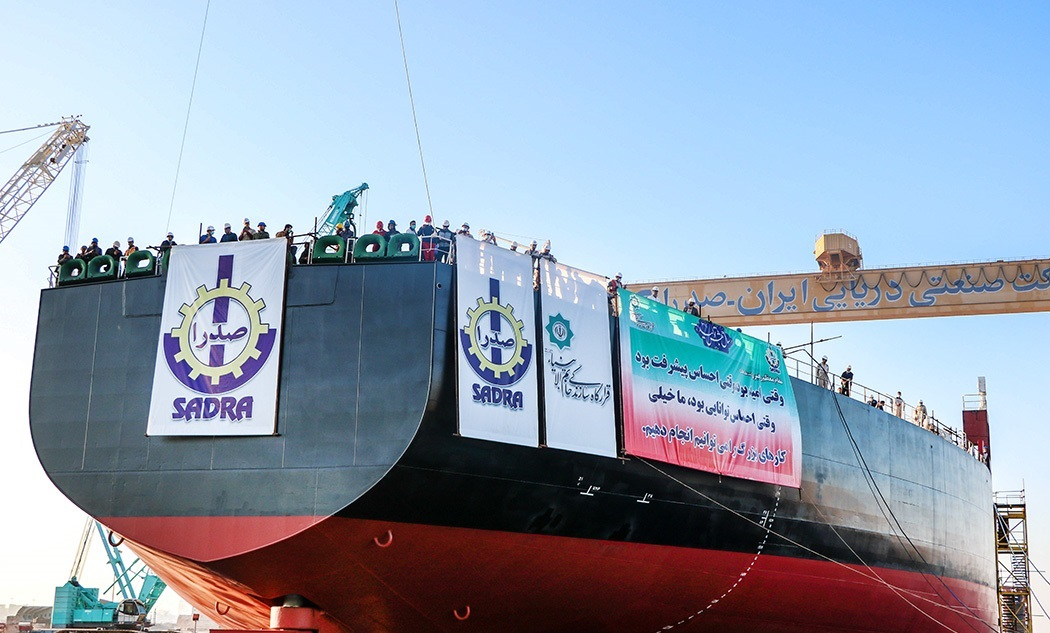

History
- Name: Yoraco
- Port of registry: Panama
- Builder: SADRA, Iran
- Launched: 23 December 2020
- Sponsored by: Saeed Mohammad

General characteristics
- Type: Aframax
- Tonnage: 64,121 GT; 113,000 DWT
- Length: 250 m (820 ft 3 in)
- Beam: 44 m (144 ft 4 in)
- Height: 21 m (68 ft 11 in)

MV Yoraco is an Iranian-made and Panama-flagged crude oil tanker ordered by Venezuela, with a capacity of 800,000 barrels. It will be the first domestic hybrid vessel fueled by liquefied natural gas (LNG) and low sulfur fuel oil," according to the International Maritime Organization (IMO), and will meet current IMO criteria.

Launched in 2020 by Iranian shipyard SADRA in Bushehr, it is the second Aframax built in the country after the Sorocaima. and two more are on order.

== Construction ==
In June 2015, Qobad Choubdar, head of SADRA's board of directors told media that "Aframax-2 which is due to be delivered in two years to Venezuela, has registered a work-in-progress rate of approximately 70%". Bellingcat reported based on satellite imagery acquired from the shipyard in Bushehr, new sections of the keel of the tanker were laid in the drydock between November 2018 and January 2019. Her launching ceremony was held on 23 December 2020, with the name Yoraco seen on the hull. In June 2022, during President Nicolas Maduro's visit to Iran, Iran delivered the Aframax II tanker to Venezuela.
