= SADRA =

Iranian shipbuilding company

Sadra Company
- Company type: Public
- Industry: Shipbuilding, Oil and gas
- Founded: 1968; 58 years ago
- Headquarters: Bushehr and Mazandaran (Iran)
- Products: Container & Product Carrier, Multi-purpose cargo Ship, Ferry, FPSO/FSO, Cable Laying Vessel, Pipe Laying, Drill-Ship, AHTS & Special Vessel..
- Website: www.sadra.ir

The Iran Marine Industrial Company (Persian: شرکت صنعتی دریایی ایران), also known as SADRA, was founded in 1968 as a small ship repair yard in Bushehr. Since then, SADRA has established itself as the leading shipbuilding and ship repairing company in Iran. SADRA is also active in offshore oil & gas development. SADRA specializes in building ships, docks, and floating oil rigs. Sadra Group is a sister company of Iran's state-owned Iran Shipbuilding and Offshores Industries Complex Co. (ISOICO). As of April 2009, the IRGC-controlled construction conglomerate, Khatam al-Anbiya Construction Headquarters owns a controlling stake in SADRA.

== History ==
- In 2005, SADRA won a 100 million euro contract to build four cargo ships for German company Rickmers.
- In 2006, SADRA group won a $2.4 billion contract to build 10 LNG carriers for the Belgian shipping group EXMAR.
- In 2009, SADRA begun manufacturing four 113,000-metric-ton Aframax oil tankers for Venezuela.
- In 2009, SADRA launched a domestically-built semi-floatable drilling rig for the Caspian Sea. The semi-submersible rig called 'Iran-Alborz' is the largest in the Middle East. The semi-floatable platform is able to operate at water depths up to 1,030 meters and can drill down to 6,000 meters under the seabed. Iran-Alborz is operated by Iran North Drilling Co.
- Since 2010, SADRA has been involved in the development of South Pars phases 13 & 14.
- Iran Marine Industrial Company SADRA delivered the second Aframax oil ship on 12 June 2022 in a meeting between Iran’s President Ebrahim Raisi and his Venezuelan counterpart Nicolas Maduro after the documents were signed.

== Iranian ship building market and industry ==
Over the next two decades, Iran would need 500 new ships, including 120 oil tankers, 40 liquefied natural gas (LNG) carriers, and over 300 commercial vessels. In 2009, in a move aimed at further enhancing Iran's shipbuilding industry, President Mahmoud Ahmadinejad said he will ban the purchase of foreign ships by Iranian organizations. The Ministry of Commerce has confirmed that Iran is able to build all its needed sea fleets inside the country.

== Ships built by SADRA ==
Aframax

- MV Sorocaima (2012)
- MV Yoraco (2020)

== See also ==
- ISOICO - SADRA's sister company
- Iran Shipping Lines
- Iranian Offshore Engineering and Construction Company
