= PetroIran =

Petroiran Development Company Petroiran
- Company type: Subsidiary of Naftiran Intertrade (part of NIOC)
- Industry: Oil and gas
- Founded: 1997; 29 years ago
- Headquarters: Tehran, Iran
- Key people: Mansour Mehrshad(CEO)
- Parent: Naftiran Intertrade
- Website: www.petroiran.com

Petroiran Development Company Limited (Petroiran; PEDCO) is an oil and gas company based in Tehran, Iran. It is a subsidiary of Naftiran Intertrade, a part of the National Iranian Oil Company, responsible for developing upstream oil projects. The company was established in 1997 and in 1999 it was registered in St. Helier, Jersey.

In 2003 it was announced that Petroiran will merge with Petropars, another subsidiary of Naftiran Intertrade. The merger did not take a place. In 2007, the company was designated for privatization. On 14 December 2008, it was sold to Dana Energy. However, the deal was not finalized.

The company develops the South Pars, Azadegan, Foroozan, Salman, Nosrat, Farzam and Arash fields. Belpars, a joint company of Petroiran and Belarusneft, a subsidiary of Belneftekhim, is developing the Jofeir oil field.

In 2006, the company had a legal dispute with Romanian Grup Servicii Petroliere over the ownership of jack-up drilling rigs GSP Orizont and GSP Fortuna.
