= Dana Energy =

Iranian oil and gas company

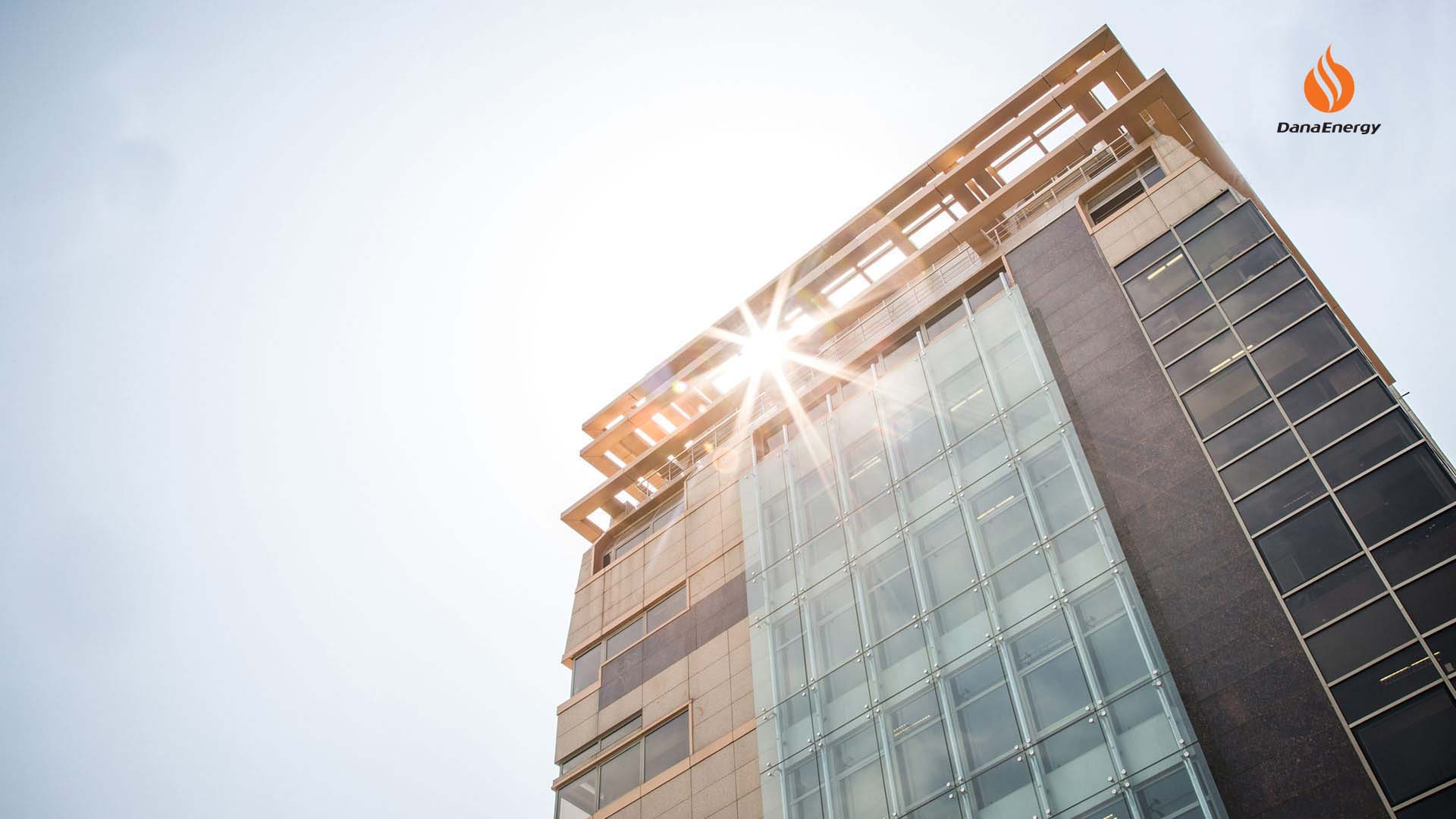
- Dana Energy Headquarters
- Type: Private
- Industry: Oil and gas industry
- Founded: 2000
- Headquarters: Tehran, Iran
- Area served: Middle East, International
- Key people: Mohammad Iravani (Founder & Chairman)
- Products: Natural gas Petroleum
- Revenue: $268 million (2024)
- Net income: $26.1 million (2024)
- Number of employees: +2500 (2024)
- Divisions: Exploration and Production Oilfield Services Capital Development

Dana Energy (Persian: شرکت انرژی دانا) is a private oil and gas company headquartered in Tehran, Iran. It is an exploration and production (E&P) and oilfield services company operating in Middle East and Asia. Formed in 2000, the company was initially an oilfield services company and ventured into field development in 2008. By the addition of petroleum products trading to its portfolio in 2013, Dana Energy extended their business into the midstream sector, however due to sanctions on Iran, their trading division came to a halt.

== History ==
Dana Energy was established in 2000 in Tehran, as a privately held company with the main purpose of providing service to upstream oil and gas projects. The company started its first seismic project and service provision for Iran's upstream sector in 2002. The project marked the beginning of the company's geophysical operations in Iran's exploration sector. In 2003, they embarked on seismic services in Iran's south western oil fields. In 2006, the company got involved in the execution of drilling projects and the provision of rig and drilling services.

Their onshore drilling services and rig lease began in 2007. Dana Energy was awarded drilling contracts in 2008 for 22 wells in Phases 15&16 of South Pars. In 2009, Dana Energy's drilling fleet drilled exploratory wells under a contract with the Exploration Department of the National Iranian Oil Company (NIOC). Dana Energy in 2011 drilled another 22 wells in phases 17&18. A year later, the first international experience was carried out by fulfilling two seismic projects in Pakistan. In 2013, petroleum products trading commenced, however due to sanctions on Iran, their trading division came to a halt. In 2016, Dana Energy qualified as an Iranian E&P company.

In 2015, a new corporate governance model was introduced, prompting the company to undergo restructuring. It transitioned from a holding company to a corporate structure that consolidated all its divisions and subsidiaries under a single brand. The rebranding occurred simultaneously to ensure the brand's appearance and identity aligned with the company's new approach, which aimed to be more dynamic, streamlined, and efficient.

In addition to its operations in the oilfield services sector, Dana Energy has also been active in field development within the upstream sector. In June 2016, it became the first private Iranian company to receive an Exploration and Production (E&P) contractor certification from the National Iranian Oil Company (NIOC). In 2018, Dana Energy signed an agreement with the Russian firm Zarubezhneft for the development of the Aban and Paydar-e Gharb oil fields under the framework of the Iran Petroleum Contract (IPC).

== Operations ==
Dana Energy is currently organized into three business segments:

=== Exploration and production ===
A deal was struck on 14 December 2008, for Dana Energy to acquire Petroiran Company under the privatization law, which permitted the government to sell its assets. The purchase, however, wasn't finalized. The acquisition was initially conducted following Dana Energy's strategy in becoming an E&P company.

Since its qualification, Dana Energy has signed several Memorandum of Understandings (MoUs) with international oil companies for development studies on Iranian oilfields. These MoU include: Austria's OMV for Band-e-Karkheh, Norway's DNO for Changuleh Sohrab, West-Paydar and Aban are other oilfields that have been studied by Dana Energy and their partners. Dana Energy signed another MoU with NIOC or the development study of Sepher and Jufeyr oilfields.

=== Oilfield services ===
Dana Energy's OFS segment includes seismic services, data processing and subsurface imaging, drilling operations, rig provision and management, along with a wide range of drilling services such as cementing and acidizing and provision of drill bits and down-hole equipment. Dana Energy has carried out offshore and onshore projects mostly in southern and western parts of Iran and conducting offshore drilling activities of South Pars gas field located in the Persian Gulf.

Dana Energy drilled 44 wells in total in Phases 15, 16, 17, and 18 with contracts exceeding US$1.7 billion. The company has a record of drilling 497 meters a day in well SPD16-06. More than 6,000 meters were perforated in less than two months with minimum nonproductive time. Dana Energy has also carried out simultaneous operations (SIMOPS) which included, drilling new wells, acidizing and clean-up of finished wells whilst producing gas in phase 15. This job was one of a kind in the region and was successfully managed with high safety standards. Dana Energy provided cementing and stimulating services in Phases 9, 10, 14, 15, 16, 17, 18, 20, and 21 of the South Pars.

=== Geophysical services ===
The company is equipped with a data processing center. In 2012, this department was awarded the contract for Bibihakimeh project, which was the largest mountainous 3D seismic assignment in Iran. This project was located in south west of Iran, covering 1627 km^{2} and 106,222 shot points were recorded in this project.

In 2016, this division signed an agreement with France's CGG Services SA to cooperate in defining, execution and implementation of onshore seismic data acquisition and processing projects in Iran.

Dana Energy's Geophysical Services international activities started in Pakistan where two 3D seismic data acquisitions in Ratana and Sadiqabad and a 2D seismic data acquisition in Hisal were carried out.

=== Well stimulation vessel ===
Dana Energy owns a stimulation vessel that is able to apply the three commonly used well stimulation techniques. The techniques includes acid injection, solvents solution, nitrogen lifting and hydraulic fracturing. The ship has storage capacity for 90,000 gallons of acid and 18,500 gallons of chemical additives; and a water maker with a capacity of 25 metric tons.

== See Also ==
- Chevron Corporation
- Abu Dhabi National Oil Company
