= Hedayatollah Khademi =

Iranian representative

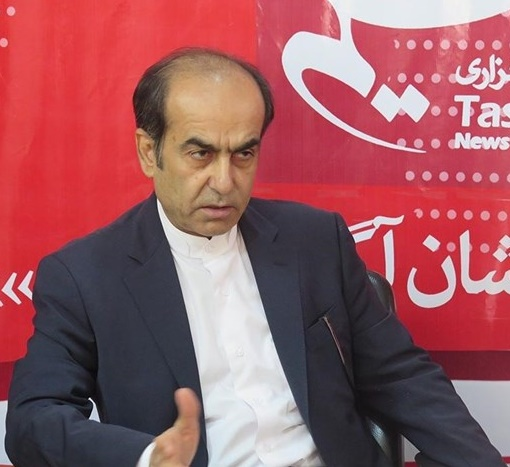

Chair of O.E.O.C.

Elected Representative (10th term); Islamic Consultative Assembly
- Preceded by: Hojatolath Darvishpour
- Succeeded by: Abdollah Izadpanah
- Majority: 72,738 (55.34%)

Chief executive officer of North Drilling
- Preceded by: Asghar Rafiee
- Succeeded by: Ezatolah Hejazi

Personal details
- Born: September 23, 1958 (age 66); Izeh, Khouzestan, Iran
- Education: Mechanical engineering
- Alma mater: Bangalore University
- Website: https://hedayatkhademi.com/

Hedayatollah Khademi (Persian: هدایت‌الله خادمی, born September 23, 1958, in Izeh) is an Iranian politician and executive manager, who was the representative of Izeh and Baghmalek, from Khuzestan province in the tenth Islamic Consultative Assembly and was a member of the Energy Commission of the Assembly.

Khademi has a bachelor's degree in mechanical engineering from Bangalore University and started his professional activity in 1985 in the National Iranian Steel Group. He joined the National Iranian Drilling Company in 1988 and was the CEO of North Drilling Company from 2008 to 2015. He is currently the chairman of the board of directors of the National Iranian Oil Exploration Operations Company.

== Biography ==
Hedayatollah Khademi was born on September 23, 1958, in Izeh, Khuzestan province. He spent his childhood and adolescence in this city until receiving his high school diploma, then moved to India to continue his education at Bangalore University. He has a bachelor's degree in mechanical engineering from Bangalore University.

He started working in the National Iranian Steel Group in 1985 and also continued his activity in the National Iranian Drilling Company (a subsidiary of the National Iranian Oil Company) from 1988. He worked in this company until 2009 and his last position was deputy CEO in engineering affairs. In 2009, he was appointed as the CEO of North Drilling Company and was in charge of this position for more than 6 years until 2015.

== Executive records ==
- National Iranian Drilling Company:
  - Head of General Repairs
  - Department Head of
  - Engineering and Planning
  - Department Director of
  - Engineering Affairs Deputy
- CEO Board member CEO of North Drilling Company

== Islamic Consultative Assembly (10th term) ==
Khademi won the tenth parliamentary elections with 72,738 votes out of a total of 131,419 votes, equivalent to 55% of the votes, and made it to the parliament in the second round.

== Islamic Consultative Assembly (11th term) ==
Khademi also ran for the eleventh term of the Islamic Consultative Assembly from the Izeh and Baghmalek constituency in Khuzestan province, but came in fourth with a few votes in this constituency. He protested the result to the Guardian Council by presenting several clips of fraud in the elections.

== Astronomical salary ==
According to the public relations disclosure of the Ministry of Oil, Hedayatollah Khadem receives 27 million tomans monthly salary from the National Iranian Oil Company.

I have 31 years of experience in the Ministry of Oil and my job rank is over D and the Ministry of Oil pays my salary based on my job rank1

— Hedayatollah Khademi,
