= 2026 South Pars field attack =

2026 Iran war attack

- Part of the 2026 Iran war
- Locations within Iran
- Type: Airstrikes
- Location: South Pars field and Asaluyeh, Iran
- Planned by: Israel; United States
- Target: Iranian oil and gas pipelines
- Date: 18 March 2026; 2:10 p.m. IRST (UTC+3:30)
- Executed by: Israeli Air Force
- Outcome: Damage affected 12% of Iran's total gas production; Output halted at two refineries; Iran halted gas supply to Iraq; Immediate spikes in oil prices globally

On 18 March 2026, Israel conducted an attack on Iranian gas and oil sites in South Pars gas field and Asaluyeh oil refinery amid the 2026 Iran war. South Pars—the world's largest natural gas field—is jointly operated by Iran and Qatar, which Qatar calls North Dome. The attack was intended to cut off a large source of revenue for the Islamic Revolutionary Guard Corps (IRGC).

The attack is described as a major escalation, exacerbating worldwide energy supply disruptions of worldwide disruptions. Iran promptly retaliated by attacking energy infrastructures of Israel and several Gulf Arab states. While it has been confirmed that the U.S. coordinated and approved the attack, President Donald Trump later denied knowledge of the attack in advance and ruled out further strikes on Iranian energy sites.

== Background ==
South Pars gas field is crucial to Iran's energy supply, amounting up to 70 percent of the country's gas production. As the fourth-largest consumer of natural gas globally, behind the United States, China, and Russia, Iran relies heavily on gas to produce electricity and heat homes due to its cold climate.

Israel first targeted several Iranian fuel sites in Tehran and the neighboring Karaj on 7 March 2026. Israel confirmed its "significant strike" targeting fuel storage and energy complexes in the capital, claiming they were being used by the Iranian Armed Forces. The United States opposed the Israeli strikes on oil facilities, expressing concern that the strikes could backfire strategically by producing support for the Islamic Republic. During the bombing raid on Kharg Island on 13 March, the United States struck military targets but spared the oil infrastructure "for reasons of decency."

== Attacks ==
Israel conducted airstrikes on the South Pars natural gas field as well as oil and petrochemical facilities in Asaluyeh, according to Iranian state media, blaming both Israel and the United States. Although it initially objected Israeli targeting of Iranian oil sites, the United States approved the attack and coordinated with Israel, supporting the strike as a message to Iran over its closure of the Strait of Hormuz. U.S. president Donald Trump has ruled out any further strikes on Iranian energy sites, however. Initial reports revealed that the damage caused to sections of South Pars gas field make up nearly 12 percent of Iran's total gas production.

According to Fars News Agency, Israel struck petrochemical facilities in Asaluyeh, damaging storage tanks, gas installations, and refineries. The attack targeted supply and transmission pipelines and took place around 2:10 p.m. local time. Iran's Ministry of Petroleum said that a number of facilities were damaged and that a fire at the gas field was being put under control. No casualties were immediately reported. The attack halted output at two refineries with a combined capacity of 100 million cubic meters per day. A number of phases at the gas field were shut down to stop the fire from spreading.

Independent evaluation by journalists did show massive damage to the Iranian installations, with the biggest refinery of the complex, number 4, based on an assessment from satellite imagery taken 3 days after the Israeli attack, almost completely destroyed and the smaller refinery number 7 showing signs of heavy damage as well. The gas tanks, which had been reported to have been hit, seemed to be intact.

== Aftermath ==
The IRGC issued evacuation orders for several oil facilities across Saudi Arabia, the United Arab Emirates, and Qatar, deeming them "direct and legitimate targets and will be targeted in the coming hours." These targets include SAMREF refinery and Jubail petrochemical complex in Saudi Arabia, Al Hosn gas field in the UAE, and Ras Laffan refinery and Mesaieed petrochemical complex in Qatar.

Following news of the attack, international oil prices increased from $103 a barrel to $108. Gas prices in Europe increased by 7 percent amid fears of Iranian retaliatory action against energy infrastructure in the Gulf Arab states. Iran halted its gas flows to Iraq, which relies on Iran for between a third and 40 percent of its gas and power needs.

=== Iranian retaliation ===
QatarEnergy reported that same-day Iranian retaliatory missile strikes on Ras Laffan Industrial City caused "extensive damage." Qatar's ministry of interior said that it had brought a fire under control and that no injuries were reported. The Qatari foreign ministry strongly condemned "the brutal" Iranian attack, considering it "a dangerous escalation, a flagrant violation of its sovereignty, and a direct threat to its national security." Qatar also declared the Iranian embassy's military and security personnel and staff as persona non grata. United Kingdom Prime Minister Keir Starmer condemned "in the strongest terms" the Iranian strike on Qatari gas facilities.

Saudi Arabia said its air defenses had intercepted four ballistic missiles launched toward Riyadh and another two launched toward the Eastern Province. It reported four injuries as a result of falling shrapnel from an intercepted ballistic missile. Saudi foreign minister Prince Faisal bin Farhan Al Saud said his country's patience with "Iranian aggression is not unlimited" and that trust in Iran has been "completely shattered."

The UAE said its air defenses dealt with 13 ballistic missiles and 27 drones from Iran. Operations at gas facilities in Abu Dhabi were suspended as a result of two incidents of fallen debris. The UAE condemned the "Iranian terrorist attack" targeting its Habshan gas facility, stating that it constitutes a "dangerous escalation and a violation of the principles of international law."

An Iranian missile attack struck the oil refinery at Haifa in northern Israel which, according to Israeli Energy Minister Eli Cohen, did not cause "significant damage" but briefly disrupted power for 45 minutes and caused "localized" damage to the power grid.

== Reactions ==
- Iran: President Masoud Pezeshkian warned of "consequences beyond control, the scope of which would engulf the entire world" following the strikes on South Pars. The IRGC issued evacuation orders for several oil facilities in Gulf Arab states, designating them "direct and legitimate targets" for Iranian retaliatory strikes.
- Israel: Prime Minister Benjamin Netanyahu asserted that Israel "acted alone" in attacking the gas field. Israeli officials said that the United States was informed before the attack.
- Oman: Oman condemned the attack as a "dangerous escalation" and a "direct threat" to the energy supplies and security of the region, as well as a "violation of international laws and norms."
- Qatar: Qatar condemned the strikes on South Pars as "dangerous and irresponsible." Blaming Israel for the strikes, Qatari foreign ministry spokesman Majed al-Ansari stated that "the Israeli targeting of facilities linked to Iran’s South Pars field, an extension of Qatar’s North Field, is a dangerous & irresponsible step amid the current military escalation in the region," and that "targeting energy infrastructure constitutes a threat to global energy security."
- United Arab Emirates: The UAE condemned the attack, noting that South Pars field is connected to Qatar's North Dome, and warned that the strikes "represented a dangerous escalation" which "entails serious environmental repercussions and directly endangers civilians."
- United States: President Donald Trump wrote on Truth Social shortly after the strikes: "Remember, for all of those absolute 'fools' out there, Iran is considered, by everyone, to be the NUMBER ONE STATE SPONSOR OF TERROR. We are rapidly putting them out of business!" Although he supported the strike on South Pars, Trump indicated that he no longer wants any further strikes on Iranian energy sites. In a later statement, Trump claimed that he "knew nothing about this particular attack" in advance and denied U.S. or Qatari involvement in the attack, further insisting that Israel "violently lashed out" at major facilities "out of anger." Trump later said he knew of the strikes in advance but told Israel "don't do that."
- Unnamed Gulf Arab countries sought explanation from the Trump administration following the Iranian retaliatory strikes.

== See also ==
- 2026 Aramco refinery attack
