= Noor Vijeh Company =

Private company based in Tehran

Noor Vijeh
- Native name: نور ویژه
- Company type: Private Joint-Stock
- Industry: Desalination; Reverse Osmosis
- Founded: 2001
- Headquarters: Tehran, Iran
- Number of employees: Over 250
- Website: www.nvco.org

The Noor Vijeh Company (Persian: نورویژه) (NVCo) is a private company based in Tehran involved in financing, execution, and operation of major water desalination schemes via reverse osmosis (RO).

== History ==
The company was established in 2001 and is currently one of Iran's largest private investors in reverse osmosis.

Noor Vijeh's RO plant in the city of Qom with a capacity of approximately 3,000 cubic metres (790 thousand US gallons) per day successfully completed its contract in 2006.

As of June 2020, the registered capital of the company according to the Official Gazette stands at nearly 209.3 billion Rials.

The newest plants to start operation are located in the city of Kangan and Bushehr, for which the opening ceremonies in 2016 received widespread media attention.

== Business model ==
The preference in NVCo is given to BOO (Build-Own-Operate) and BOT (Build-Operate-Transfer) contracts.

Noor Vijeh's plants are located in Asaluyeh, Bandar Abbas, Bushehr, Kangan, Hendijan, and Chabahar (2 phases).
