= Yeh (disambiguation) =

Yeh or YAH may refer to:

- Yeh, or Ye, a Chinese surname
- Yeh, an Arabic name of the letter Yodh
- Yeh College, a future residential college at Princeton University
- YEH, IATA code for Asalouyeh Airport, Iran

== See also ==
- "Yeh, Yeh", a 1964 instrumental, later with lyrics added
- "Yeh Yeh Yeh", a 2003 song by British singer-songwriter Melanie C
