= South Pars/North Dome Gas-Condensate field =

Natural gas field in the Persian Gulf

South Pars/North Dome Field
- Location within Middle East
- Country: Iran; Qatar
- Location: Persian Gulf
- Offshore/onshore: Offshore
- Coordinates: 26°37′08.85″N 52°04′04.67″E
- Operators: NIGC; QatarEnergy; SPGC; TotalEnergies

Field history
- Discovery: 1971
- Start of production: 1989

Production
- Peak of production (gas): 25,000,000 million cubic feet per day (710,000×10^{6} m^{3}/d)
- Estimated gas in place: 1,800,000×10^{9} cu ft (51,000×10^{9} m^{3})
- Recoverable gas: 1,260,000×10^{9} cu ft (36,000×10^{9} m^{3})
- Producing formations: Kangan (Triassic); Upper Dalan (Permian)

The South Pars/North Dome field is a natural-gas condensate field located in the Persian Gulf. It is by far the world's largest natural gas field, with ownership of the field shared between Iran and Qatar. According to the International Energy Agency (IEA), the field holds an estimated 1,800 trillion cubic feet (51 trillion cubic metres) of in-situ natural gas and some 50 billion barrels (7.9 billion cubic metres) of natural gas condensates. Ranked against other natural gas fields, it has almost as much recoverable reserves as all the other fields combined. It has significant geostrategic influence.

As of early 2026, before the beginning of the 2026 Iran war, Qatar was producing approximately 18.5 billion cubic feet (520 million cubic metres) per day from the field, accounting for around 80% of Qatari government revenues, while daily production on the Iranian side was estimated to be around only 2 billion cubic feet (57 million cubic metres). Iran's inefficient exploitation of the shared gas field is often attributed to Western sanctions, isolation and mismanagement. These have also caused the Iranian government to lag behind on pressurization efforts on their side of the field, which causes more gas to migrate to the Qatari side of the field.

On 18 March 2026, the field was attacked by the Israeli Air Force. United States officials denied coordination and approval of the Israeli attack. Initial reports revealed that the damage caused to sections of South Pars gas field make up nearly 12 percent of Iran's total gas production. Iran's Ministry of Petroleum said that a number of facilities were damaged and that a fire at the gas field was being put under control. No casualties were immediately reported. The attack halted output at two refineries with a combined capacity of 100 million cubic metres per day. Parts of the gas field were closed to stop the fire from spreading. Following news of the attack, international oil prices increased from $103 a barrel to $108. Gas prices in Europe increased by 7 percent amid fears of Iranian retaliatory action against energy infrastructure in the Gulf Arab states. Iran halted its gas flows to Iraq, which relies on Iran for between a third and 40 percent of its gas and power needs.

== Field geology ==
The field is 3,000 metres (9,800 ft) below the seabed at a water depth of 65 metres (213 ft), and consists of two independent gas-bearing formations: Kangan (Triassic) and Upper Dalan (Permian). Each formation is divided into two different reservoir layers, separated by impermeable barriers. The field consists of four independent reservoir layers K1, K2, K3, and K4.

The K1 and K3 units are mainly composed of dolomites and anhydrites, while K2 and K4, which constitute major gas reservoirs, comprise limestone and dolomite. A massive anhydrite (the Nar member) separates the K4 from the underlying K5 unit which has poor reservoir qualities. The gross pay zone in the South Pars field is approximately 450 m thick, extending from depths of approximately 2750 to 3200 m. Reservoir strata dip gently to the NE. The average thickness of the reservoir units declines from South Pars (some 450 metres (1,480 ft)) to North field (385 metres (1,263 ft)). As in other reservoir structures in neighboring areas, the reservoir in the Qatar Arch is cut by a set of NNW-SSE trending faults. Diagenesis has a major effect on reservoir quality of the field.

The field is a part of the N-trending Qatar Arch structural feature that is bounded by the Zagros fold and thrust belt to the north and northeast.

In the field, gas accumulation is mostly limited to the Permian–Triassic stratigraphic units. These units known as the Kangan–Dalan Formations constitute very extensive natural gas reservoirs in the field and Persian Gulf area, which composed of carbonate–evaporite series also known as the Khuff Formation.

Permian–Early Triassic has been divided into Faraghan (Early Permian), Dalan (Late Permian) and Kangan (Early Triassic) Formations.

The onshore industrial component of this gas field, which is located beneath the Persian Gulf, is the Asaluyeh Petrochemical Complex.

== Reserves ==
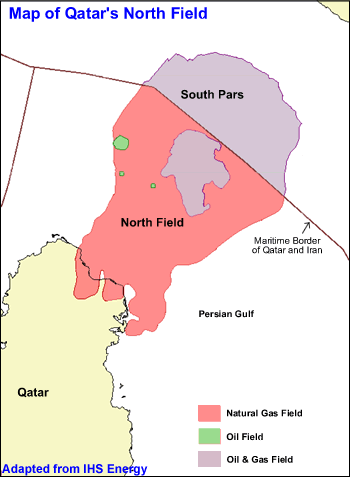
South Pars/North Dome Field

According to International Energy Agency (IEA) in 2008, the combined structure is the world's largest gas field.

In-place volumes are estimated to be around 1,800 trillion cubic feet (51 trillion cubic metres) gas in place and some 50 billion barrels (7.9 billion cubic metres) of natural gas condensate in place. With in place volumes equivalent to 360 billion barrels (57 billion cubic metres) of oil (310 billion BOE of gas and 50 billion BOE of natural gas condensate) the field is the world's biggest conventional hydrocarbon accumulation.

The field recoverable gas reserve is equivalent to some 215 billion barrels (34.2 billion cubic metres) of oil and it also holds about 16 billion barrels (2.5 billion cubic metres) of recoverable condensate corresponding of about 230 billion barrels (37 billion cubic metres) of oil equivalent recoverable hydrocarbons.

The gas recovery factor of the field is about 70%, corresponding to roughly 1,260 trillion cubic feet (36 trillion cubic metres) of total recoverable gas reserves, which is about 19% of world recoverable gas reserves.

The estimates for the Iranian section are 500 trillion cubic feet (14 trillion cubic metres) of natural gas in place and around 360 trillion cubic feet (10 trillion cubic metres) of recoverable gas which stands for 36% of Iran's total proven gas reserves and 5.6% of the world's proven gas reserves as of 2007.

The estimates for the Qatari section are 900 trillion cubic feet (25 trillion cubic metres) of recoverable gas, which amounts to almost 99% of Qatar's total proven gas reserves and 14% of the world's proven gas reserves.

Table 1 - South Pars/North Field gas reserves
	In-place gas reserve		Recoverable gas reserve	
	km^{3}	trillion ft^{3}	km^{3}	trillion ft^{3}
South Pars	14,000	500	10,000	360
North Dome	37,000	1300	26,000	900
Total	51,000	1800	36,000	1260

Note: 1 km^{3} = 1,000,000,000 m^{3} = 1 billion m^{3} = 1 trillion litres

However, since the field is a common field and the reservoir is highly homogeneous, the ultimate recoverable reserves of each country may vary from this technical assessment which only considers the static data and does not include rate of gas migration. So, it is better to say that the ultimate recoverable reserves of each country would be a factor of cumulative gas production by each of them.

The Iranian section also holds 18 billion barrels (2.9 billion cubic metres) of condensate in place of which some 9 billion barrels (1.4 billion cubic metres) are believed to be recoverable, while Qatari section believed to contains some 30 billion barrels (4.8×10^{9} m^{3}) of condensate in place and at least some 10 billion barrels (1.6 billion cubic metres) of recoverable condensate.

The field is rich in liquids and yields approximately 40 barrels (6.4 m^{3}) of condensate per 1 million cubic feet (28,000 m^{3}) of gas. It has also very high level of well productivity which in average stands for 100 million cubic feet (2,800,000 m^{3}) per day per well, while the average natural gas well productivity in Iran is 1.5 million cubic meters per day per well.

=== Reserve uncertainties ===
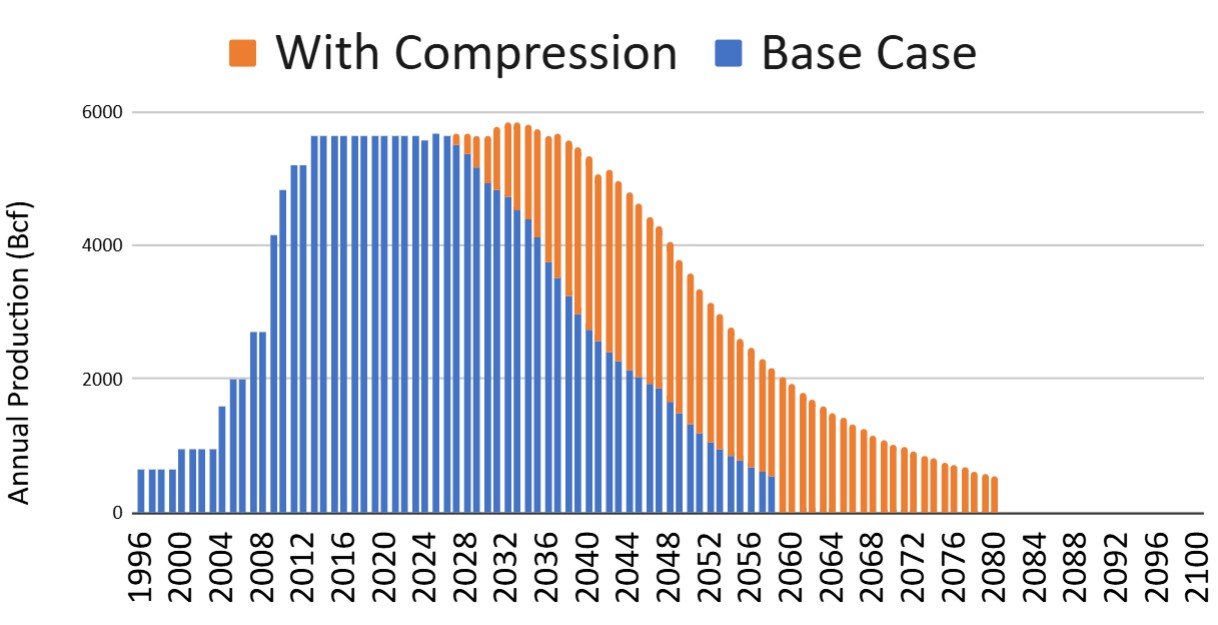
Qatar Energy Business Plan 2024 Production forecast for North Field wet gas

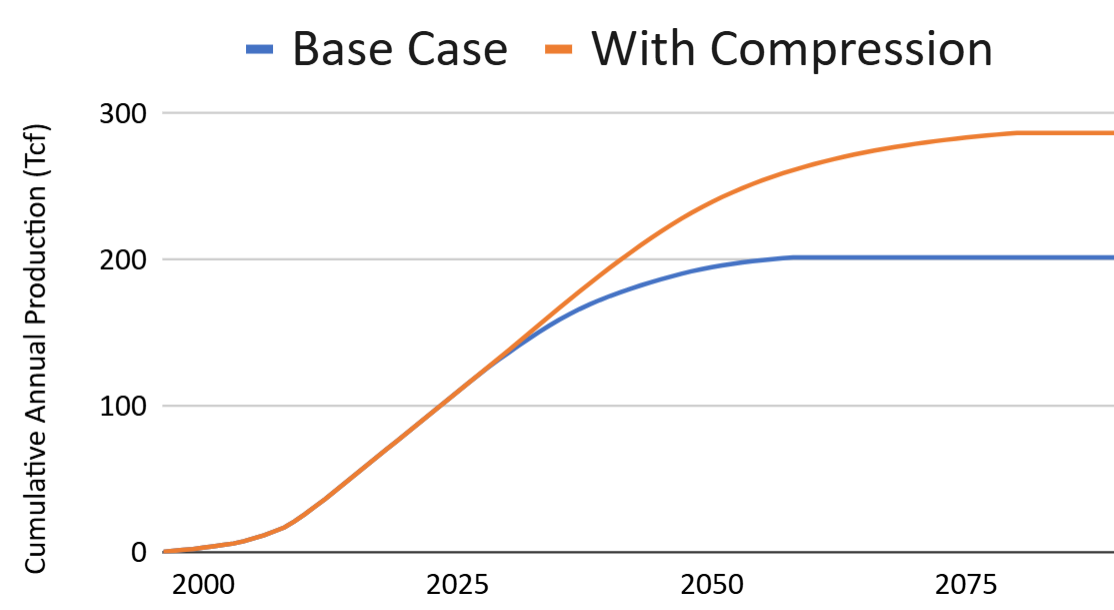
Qatar Energy Business Plan 2024 North Field Cumulative wet gas production forecast

In 2005, QatarEnergy became worried the North Dome's reserves were being developed too quickly, which could reduce reservoir pressure and possibly damage its long-term production potential. In early 2005, the government placed a moratorium on additional development projects at the North Dome pending a study of the field's reservoirs. This assessment is not expected to end until after 2009, meaning new projects are unlikely to be signed before 2010. However, this did not affect projects approved or underway before the moratorium.

The 2005 moratorium by Qatar and the subsequent extension of that raised some questions about the actual proven reserves in Qatari side of the field. There was some news in 2006 that ConocoPhillips drilled unexpectedly dry holes in the North Field and this event was at least a partial catalyst for a revamped perspective on the North field structure and potential. Further supporting evidence for skepticism about the real scale of Qatari's reserves came from the 2008 exploration round in Qatar to target exploration of gas in the pre-Khuff formation. Even one of the blocks is exactly located beneath the North Dome Field.

On 29 October 2007, Qatargas CEO Faisal Al Suwaidi stated that the 5-year moratorium on new North Field gas development projects, imposed in 2005, could be extended to 2011 or 2012. The exploration moratorium was lifted by Qatar in April 2017 with the announcement of a new gas project in the southern part of the field.

QatarEnergy issued a bond prospectus on the 5th of July 2021. This bond issue, which was managed by, amongst others Deutsche Bank and J.P. Morgan included proven and confirmed reserve numbers for 2020 of 818.6 and 1756.1 Tcf respectively. QatarEnergy is the only entity that uses the terminology of confirmed reserves and does not provide a definition for it.

The QatarEnergy confidential business plan for 2024 contains a production forecast which implies proven reserves of some 110 Tcf and contingent resources of 85 Tcf as of 2023. No forecast associated with the expansion projects are included in these numbers.

== South Pars development ==
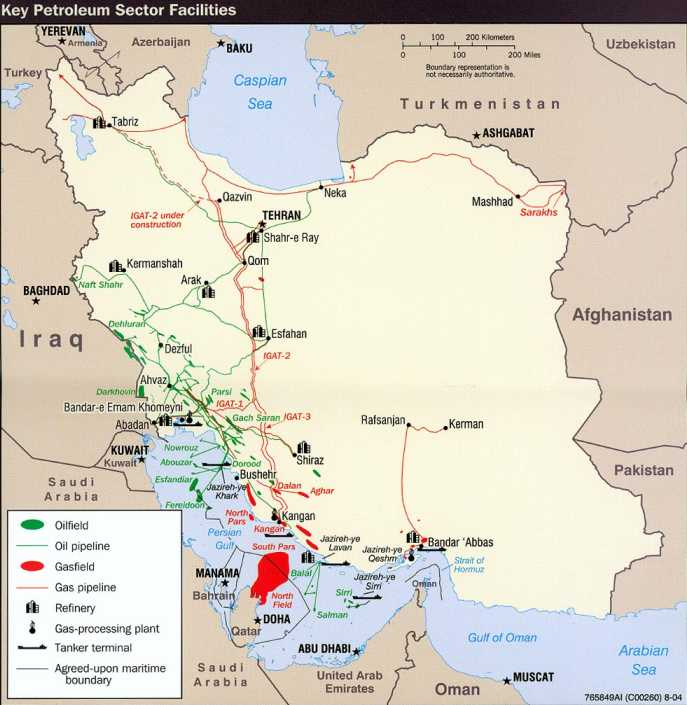
South Pars and Iranian oil and gas infrastructures

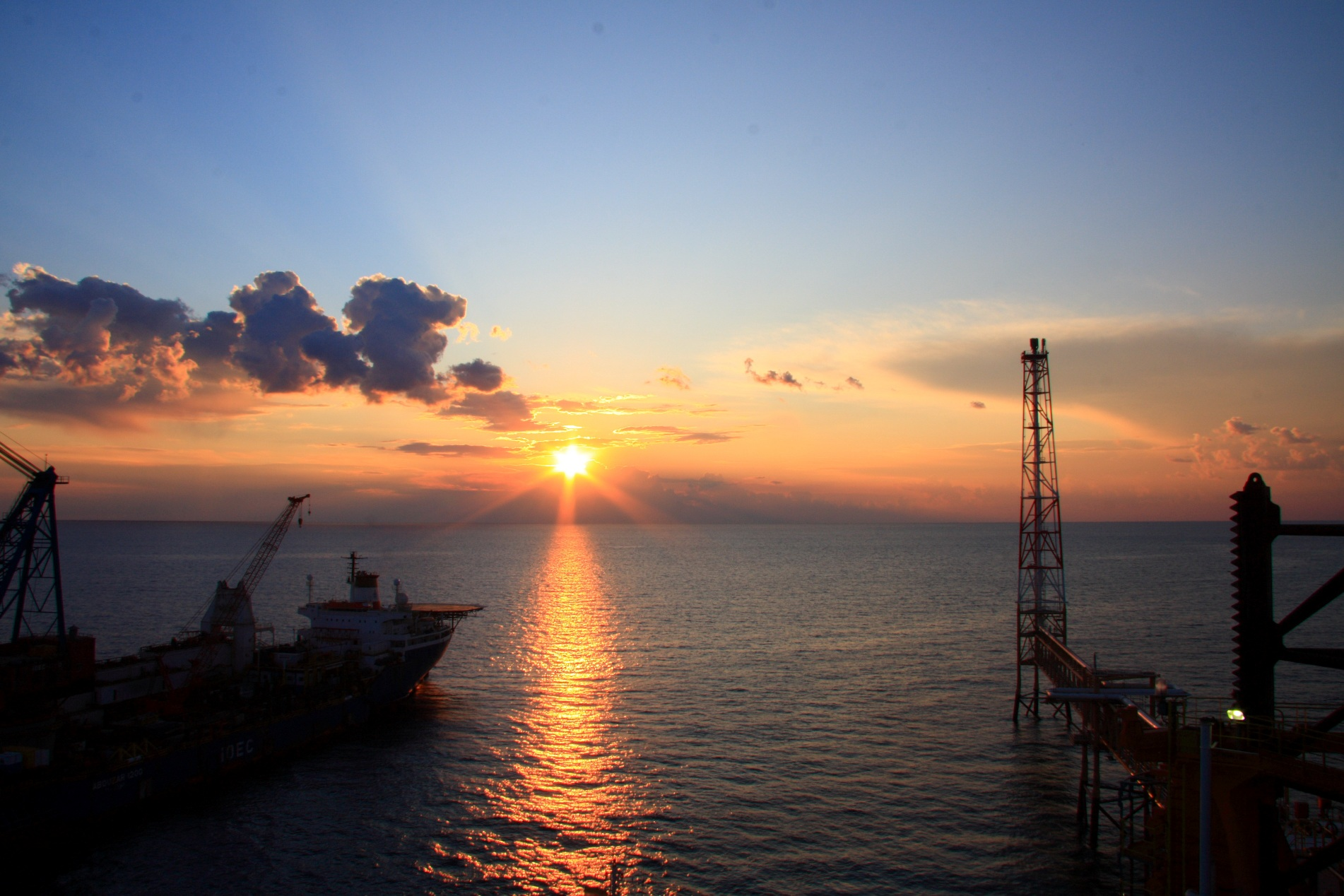
Horizon of Persian Gulf in South Pars area

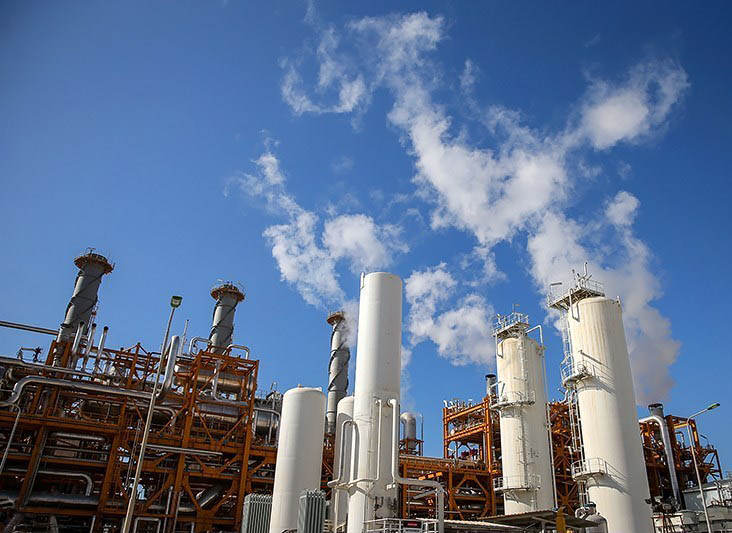
South Pars onshore facilities near Asaluyeh

The South Pars Field was discovered in 1990 by National Iranian Oil Company (NIOC). The Pars Oil and Gas Company, a subsidiary of NIOC, has jurisdiction over all South Pars-related projects. Field development has been delayed by various problems - technical (i.e., high levels of mercaptans and foul-smelling sulfur compounds), contractual issues and politics.

Gas production started from the field by commissioning phase 2 in December 2002 to produce 1 billion cubic feet per day (28,000,000 cubic metres per day) of wet gas. Gas is sent to shore via pipeline, and processed at Assaluyeh.

As of early 2026, before the beginning of the US-Iran war, Iran has produced an estimated 2 billion cubic feet per day from the field, compared to 18.5 billion by the much-smaller Qatar. Iran's inefficient exploitation of the shared gas field is often attributed to Western sanctions, isolation and mismanagement. These have also caused the Iranian government to lag behind on pressurization efforts on their side of the field, which causes more gas to migrate to the Qatari side of the field.

NIOC was planning to develop the field in 24 to 30 phases, capable of producing about 25 billion cubic feet (710,000,000 cubic metres) to 30 billion cubic feet (850,000,000 cubic metres) of natural gas per day. Each standard phase was defined for daily production of 1 billion cubic feet (28,000,000 cubic metres) of natural gas, 40,000 barrels (6,400 m^{3}) of condensate, 1500 tonnes of liquefied petroleum gas (LPG) and 200 tonnes of sulfur, however some phases have some different production plans. Each of the phases is estimated to have an average capital spend of around US$1.5 billion, and most will be led by foreign oil firms working in partnership with local companies.

Development of a South Pars phase by the Norwegian Statoil company has become infamous after extensive reports of misconduct and bribery to the Horton Investments, an Iranian consultancy firm owned by Mehdi Hashemi Rafsanjani, son of former Iranian president Hashemi Rafsanjani. Statoil committed to spending US$300 million to construct three production platforms and a pipeline. The government of Ahmadinejad, who came to power in 2005, favoured local firms over foreign companies in the energy and other sectors.

By the beginning of 2008, phases 1, 2, 3, 4 and 5 had been brought to production and by the end of 2008, phases 6, 7, 8, 9 and 10 were planned to be on stream. Phases 12, 15, 16, 17, 18, 19, 27 and 28 were under different development stages.

On 18 March 2026, during the 2026 Iran war, phases of the Iranian South Pars gas field were struck by an Israeli airstrike. Following the strike, several gas phases were closed.

=== Project finance ===
As of December 2010, about $30 billion had been invested in South Pars gas fields' development plan. It was estimated that the amount would reach over $40 billion by 2015. The Ministry of Petroleum in Iran said in a revised statement in 2011 that Iran will invest some $90 billion between 2011 and 2015 ($60 billion will be allocated to the upstream sector and the rest to the downstream sector). In 2024, Iran scheduled a $70 billion plan to maintain gas pressure and keep vital petrol production.

Economic studies showed with the operation of each South Pars phase, one percent was added to the country's gross domestic product (GDP), while phase 12 was expected to add more than three percent of GDP.

=== South Pars phases ===
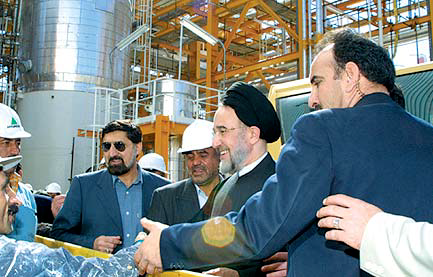
President Mohammad Khatami visits south Pars Gas field on January 25, 2002.

As at 2012, some 400 Iranian companies were taking part in the development of the South Pars gas field through supplying equipment to related projects.

- Phase 1 was developed by Petropars to produce 1 billion cubic feet (28,000,000 cubic metres) per day of natural gas, 40,000 barrels per day (6,400 m^{3}/d) of condensate, 1500 tons of LPG per day plus 200 tons of sulfur per day.
- Phases 2 and 3 were developed by a consortium of Total S.A., Petronas and Gazprom to produce 2 billion cubic feet (57,000,000 cubic metres) per day of natural gas, 80,000 barrels per day (13,000 m^{3}/d) of condensate, 3000 tons of LPG per day plus 400 tons of sulfur per day. It came online in March 2003.
- Phases 4 and 5 were developed by Eni and Petropars, to produce 2 billion cubic feet (57,000,000 cubic metres) per day of rich natural gas, 75 million cubic feet (2,100,000 cubic metres) per day of ethane, 80,000 barrels per day (13,000 m^{3}/d) of condensate, 3000 tons of LPG per day plus 400 tons of sulfur per day.
- Phases 6, 7 and 8 being developed by Petropars and Statoil to produce lean gas for re-injection into the Aghajari oilfield, and heavy gas and condensate for export. It involves construction of three offshore platforms in addition to the land based facilities. Statoil is developing the offshore platforms while Petropars is developing the land based facilities. A 31-inch (790 mm) pipe will be laid from each platform to the coast. These phases will produce 3 billion cubic feet (85,000,000 cubic metres) per day of natural gas, 70 million cubic feet (2,000,000 cubic metres) of ethane, 120,000 barrels per day (19,000 m^{3}/d) of condensate, 4500 tons of LPG per day plus 600 tons of sulfur per day.
- Phases 9 and 10 being developed by a joint venture of GS of South Korea, Oil Industries Engineering and Construction Company (OIEC Group) and Iranian Offshore Engineering and Construction Company (IOEC), in September 2002. The share of Iranian players in this contract exceeds 60%. These phases produce 2 billion cubic feet (57,000,000 cubic metres) per day of natural gas, 75 million cubic feet (2,100,000 cubic metres) per day of ethane, 80,000 barrels per day (13,000 m^{3}/d) of condensate, 3000 tons of LPG per day plus 400 tons of sulfur per day. Phases 9 & 10 were inaugurated by President Ahmadinejad in March 2009.
- Phase 11 will produce LNG through the Pars LNG project. The project was awarded to China National Petroleum Corporation in 2010 after that France's Total S.A. was excluded from the project by Iran. Finally in December 2016, the memorandum of understanding for development of this phase has been awarded to a consortium of Total from France, CNPC from China and Petropars from Iran. After September 2021, the development plans of this gas field continued by entrusting the continuation of the work to Iranian companies, including National Oil Company, Petropars, Pars Oil and Gas and Marine Facilities. In June 2023, the 3,200-ton platform, the heaviest in the South Pars field, was moved and installed in an unprecedented operation by Iranian experts, and gas production from this phase started.
- Phase 12 development begin carried out by Petropars as a LNG project. This phase will produce 2.5 billion cubic feet (71,000,000 cubic metres) per day of rich natural gas, 75 million cubic feet (2,100,000 cubic metres) of ethane, 80,000 barrels per day (13,000 m^{3}/d) of natural gas condensate, 3000 tons of LPG per day plus 400 tons of sulfur per day. Venezuela’s state-owned oil company Petroleos de Venezuela S.A. (PDVSA) will finance 10% of the $7.8 billion project. Angola’s Sonangol Group has also been awarded a 20% stake in phase 12 project.
- Phase 13 and 14 development will be for Persian LNG production. Development was awarded to an Iranian company (Khatam-ol-Osea) for $5 billion. The Iranian Khatam-ol-Osea Consortium is made up of several large Iranian companies, namely Khatam al-Anbiya Construction Headquarters, OIEC, SADRA, ISOICO, IDRO and NIDC. The contract to develop phase 13 was signed with a consortium comprising Mapna, SADRA and Petro Pidar Iranian companies and the phase 14 with another consortia consisting of IDRO, NIDC, Machine Sazi Arak (MSA) and Iranian Offshore Engineering and Construction Company (IOEC).
- Phases 15 and 16 development was awarded to Khatam al-Anbiya Construction Headquarters. These phases will produce 2 billion cubic feet (57,000,000 cubic metres) per day of natural gas, 75 million cubic feet (2,100,000 cubic metres) of ethane, 80,000 barrels per day (13,000 m^{3}/d) of natural gas condensate, 3,000 tons of LPG per day plus 400 tons of sulfur per day. In July 2010, the project was transferred to Iran Shipbuilding & Offshore Industries Complex. At that time, the $2 billion project was already 50% complete. Phase 15 & 16 will be completed by March 2012.
- Phases 17 and 18 development was assigned to a consortium of OIEC, IOEC and IDRO. These phases produce 2 billion cubic feet (57,000,000 cubic metres) per day of natural gas, 75 million cubic feet (2,100,000 cubic metres) of ethane, 80,000 barrels per day (13,000 m^{3}/d) of natural gas condensate, 3,000 tons of LPG per day plus 400 tons of sulfur per day. Phases 17 & 18 were inaugurated by President Hassan Rouhani in April 2017.
- Phase 19 development was awarded to Petropars. These phases will produce 2 billion cubic feet (57,000,000 cubic metres) per day of natural gas, 75 million cubic feet (2,100,000 cubic metres) of ethane, 80,000 barrels per day (13,000 m^{3}/d) of natural gas condensate, 3,000 tons of LPG per day plus 400 tons of sulfur per day. As it is understood this phase is defined within phase 1 so it can be regarded as some kind of expansion for phase 1.
- Phases 20 and 21 development was awarded to OIEC Group. 2 billion cubic feet (57,000,000 cubic metres) per day of natural gas, 75 million cubic feet (2,100,000 cubic metres) of ethane, 80,000 barrels per day (13,000 m^{3}/d) of natural gas condensate, 3,000 tons of LPG per day plus 400 tons of sulfur per day. Phases 20 & 21 were inaugurated by President Hassan Rouhani in April 2017.
- Phases 22, 23 and 24 were awarded to Khatam al-Anbiya Construction Headquarters, Petro Sina Arian and SADRA and are located in the north-eastern frontier of the field. The aim of phases 22, 23 and 24 development is to produce 42.5 million cubic metres (1.50 billion cubic feet) per day of natural gas, 57,000 barrels per day (9,100 m^{3}/d) of natural gas condensate, and 300 tons of sulfur per day. The three phases also are designed to produce 800,000 tons of LNG and 750,000 tons of ethane per year.
- Phases 25 and 26 are in tender.
- Phases 27 and 28 development was assigned to Petropars on an EPC scheme. These phases will produce 2 billion cubic feet (57,000,000 cubic metres) per day of natural gas, 75 million cubic feet (2,100,000 cubic metres) of ethane, 75,000 barrels per day (11,900 m^{3}/d) of natural gas condensate, 3,000 tons of LPG per day plus 400 tons of sulfur per day.

=== South Pars gas and condensate production plan ===
Phase	General contractor	2003	2004	2005	2006	2007	2008	2009	2010	2011	2012	2013	2014	2015	2016
1	Petropars		500	750	750	750	750	750	750	750	750	750	750	750	750
2 & 3	Consortium of Total, Gazprom and Petronas	2000	2000	2000	2000	2000	2000	2000	2000	2000	2000	2000	2000	2000	2000
4 & 5	Consortium of Eni, Petronas and NIOC			2000	2000	2000	2000	2000	2000	2000	2000	2000	2000	2000	2000
6, 7 & 8	Petropars and Statoil						1000	2500	3700	3700	3700	3700	3700	3700	3700
9 & 10	Consortium of GS Group, OIEC Group and IOEC						1000	2000	2000	2000	2000	2000	2000	2000	2000
11	Petropars												1000	2000	2000
12	Petropars									1000	2000	3000	3000	3000	3000
13	Khatam-ol-Osea												1000	2000	2000
14	Khatam-ol-Osea												500	1000	1000
15 & 16	Khatam al-Anbiya Construction Headquarters, replaced with OSOICO in 2010.												1000	2000	2000
17 & 18	Consortium of OIEC Group, IDRO, and IOEC												1000	2000	2000
19	IOEC & Petropars													500	1500
20 & 21	OIEC Group													1000	2000
22, 23 & 24	Khatam al-Anbiya Construction Headquarters													1000	3000
TBD													1000	2000	
Petropars													1000	2000	
Total Gas Production million ft^{3}/d		2,000	2,500	4,750	4,750	4,750	9,250	10,450	10,450	11,450	12,450	13,450	17,950	24,950	29,450
Total Condensate Production kbbl/d		80	100	190	190	190	370	420	420	460	500	540	720	1,000	1,200

Table Sources: NIOC, Pars Oil & Gas Company, Shana and Media

=== Development delays and criticisms ===
While several phases of South Pars gas field are still waiting for development and the ongoing development phases are facing delays, NIOC authorities are conducting negotiations for development of other Iranian offshore gas fields like North Pars, Kish, Golshan, Ferdows and Lavan.

Many Iranian energy analysts believe that NIOC authorities should focus on full development of South Pars field prior to conduction of any new project for development of other undeveloped Iranian offshore gas fields.

The priority of South Pars full development is not only due to its shared nature with Qatar, but also with huge capability of the field to add significant liquid production to Iranian liquid export capacity.

On 27 February 2009, one of the members of Iranian Parliaments criticized lack of attention on the importance of acceleration of South Pars field development and the field development delays.

==== Scale and impacts of delays ====
By the end of 2008, Qatar's cumulative production from the field was two times higher than Iran's cumulative production from the field. Qatar produced about 20 trillion cubic feet (5.7×10^{11} cubic metres) of natural gas in the period of 1997 to 2008, while Iran produced about 10 trillion cubic feet (2.8×10^{11} cubic metres) of natural gas in the period of 2003 to 2008. The 2:1 ratio of Qatar's cumulative gas production from the field to Iran's is forecasted to continue at least for the short term: by the end of 2011, Qatar's total cumulative production from the field will reach 41 trillion cubic feet (1.2×10^{12} cubic metres) of natural gas, while Iran's will stand at 21 trillion cubic feet (5.9×10^{11} cubic metres) of natural gas in the same year. The ratio is maintained mainly because Qatar's annual production is almost twice the Iranian production level.

In 2011, Qatar will reach an annual production capacity 8 trillion cubic feet (2.3×10^{11} cubic metres) of natural gas per year, while in that year Iran's production capacity will reach 4 trillion cubic feet (1.1×10^{11} cubic metres) per year. If Iran could implement all of its South Pars planned development projects on time, then it would reach the production capacity of 8 trillion cubic feet (2.3×10^{11} cubic metres) of natural gas per year, not earlier than 2015.

The most important impact of delays and lower production in Iranian side would be migration of gas to the Qatari part and a loss of condensate yield due to decreased field pressure.

== North Dome development ==
The North Dome, also known as North Field, was discovered in 1971, with the completion of Shell's North West Dome-1 well.

With falling oil and associated gas production, and depletion of the Khuff reserves, developing the North field became imperative. In 1984 it was decided that development would occur in phases. Phase 1 involved installing production, processing, and transport facilities for 800 million cubic feet (23,000,000 cubic metres) of natural gas per day to serve local utilities and produce 5,000 tons per day of propane, butane, gasoline, and naphtha. In 1989 a gas sweetening plant and sulfur processing unit were added. Phase one was online by early 1991. Gas from North Field phase one has been primarily used for local demand, and injection into the Dukhan field. Phase two was expected to involve selling North Field gas to its neighbors, possibly through a Gulf Cooperation Council (GCC) gas grid. Phase three involved exporting to Europe and Asia. Even before the Persian Gulf War, this phase ran into trouble. To justify the investment, QatarEnergy needed two large-scale long-term supply contracts. Despite efforts from QP managing director Jaber al-Marri, contracts were not forthcoming. This switched emphasis to domestic outlets. In 1988, a firm of international consultants presented a plan to QP for developing domestic projects to utilize Qatari gas. Suggestions included an aluminum smelter, a ferro-alloy production plant, methanol production facilities, and expansion of petrochemical and fertilizer operations.

Qatar rapidly expanded its production and exports from North Dome Field. Here are a number of milestones:

- 1989: Qatar begins production from North Field phase one (Alpha) at rate of 800 million cubic feet (23,000,000 cubic metres) of natural gas per day.
- 1997: Qatar begins exporting by sending 5.7 billion cubic feet (160,000,000 cubic metres) (0.16 million tons) of LNG to Spain.
- 2005: Qatar exports a total of 987 billion cubic feet (2.79×10^{10} cubic metres) (27.9 million tons) of LNG. Of this, 316 billion cubic feet (8.9×10^{9} cubic metres) went to Japan, 293 billion cubic feet (8.3×10^{9} cubic metres) to South Korea, 213 billion cubic feet (6.0×10^{9} cubic metres) to India, 161 billion cubic feet (4.6×10^{9} cubic metres) to Spain, and 3 billion cubic feet (85,000,000 cubic metres) to the United States.
- 2006: Qatar surpasses Indonesia as the world's largest LNG exporter.
- 2007: In March QatarEnergy solidifies its leading role when Qatargas completed its fifth LNG production train, giving the country 1.5 trillion cubic feet (4.2×10^{10} cubic metres) of annual liquefaction capacity, the most in the world.

Subsequent phases of the North field development provided feedstock to LNG plants at Ras Laffan Industrial City. By 2025, North Field through Ras Laffan produced 77 million tonnes of LNG, expected to increase to 126 million tonnes by 2027.

As of early 2026, before the beginning of the US-Iran war, Qatar has produced approximately 18.5 billion cubic feet per day from the field, accounting for around 80% of Qatari government revenues, and supplying around 20% of the world's LNG. During the war, 10,000 employees were evacuated, and activities shut down. The Iran attack may postpone the planned expansion by a year.

=== Qatar's gas to liquids (GTL) industry ===
==== Oryx GTL (Sasol) ====
The ORYX GTL plant was commissioned in early 2007, as the first operational GTL plant in Qatar. The plant nameplate capacity is 34,000 barrels per day (5,400 m^{3}/d), however, the plant has faced technical challenges and did not reach full capacity during the first year of operation. Modifications recommended by Sasol assist with overcoming this shortfall and production capacity was reached/ maintained from 2009 onwards. The plant uses 330 cubic feet per day (0.11×10^{6} m^{3}/ks) of natural gas from the Al Khaleej Gas project. The ORYX GTL project uses Sasol's Slurry Phase Distillate (SPD) process.

==== Pearl GTL (Shell) ====
The project is under construction and will be the world's largest GTL plant which will have the capacity of 140,000 barrels per day (22,000 m^{3}/d) of middle distillates and significant quantities of LPG and condensate. The first of two 70,000 barrels per day (11,000 m^{3}/d) GTL trains is planned to start production in 2011. Around 1.6 billion cubic feet per day (45,000,000 m^{3}/d) of natural gas will be supplied from the North field to the project. Shell has 100% of the equity in the integrated upstream and plant project. In March 2026, the plant was damaged by an attack from Iran.

Table 3. North Field production plan (million cubic feet per day).

Project	Start Up	1997	1998	1999	2000	2001	2002	2003	2004	2005	2006	2007	2008	2009	2010	2011
QatarGas	1997	860	860	860	860	860	860	860	860	860	860	860	860	860	860	860
QatarGas	1998		430	430	430	430	430	430	430	430	430	430	430	430	430	430
QatarGas	2003							700	700	700	700	700	700	700	700	700
QatarGasII	2008												1700	1700	1700	1700
QatarGasII	2009													1700	1700	1700
QatarGasIII	2009														1700	1700
QatarGasIV	2009															1700
Qatargas	1999			1400	1400	1400	1400	1400	1400	1400	1400	1400	1400	1400	1400	1400
Qatargas	2004								1000	1000	1000	1000	1000	1000	1000	1000
Qatargas	2005									1000	1000	1000	1000	1000	1000	1000
Qatargas	2007											1000	1000	1000	1000	1000
Qatargas	2008												1700	1700	1700	1700
Qatargas	2010													1700	1700	1700
Al Khalij	2005									650	650	650	650	650	650	650
Dolphin	2007											2800	2800	2800	2800	4000
Pearl GTL	2009													1700	1700	1700
Total million ft^{3}/d		860	1300	2700	2700	2700	2700	3400	4400	6000	6000	9840	13240	18340	20000	23000

Table sources: QatarGas, QatarEnergy and internet

== Damage during the 2026 Iran war ==
On April 6, 2026, the Defense Minister revealed that Israel had launched an attack on Iran's petrochemical facility in Assaluyeh. Due to these assaults, companies providing electricity, water, and oxygen to Assaluyeh were targeted; however, Pars Petrochemical Company remained unharmed.

== See also ==
- Aghajari Gas Injection Project
- Dolphin Gas Project
- Ferdowsi Gas Field
- Golshan Gas Field
- Kish Gas Field
- NIOC Recent Discoveries
- Pearl GTL
- World Largest Gas Fields
- Iran-Iraq-Syria pipeline
- Qatar-Turkey pipeline
- Helium (a quarter of the Earth's helium reserves is estimated to be in South Pars)
