= Petropars =

Iranian oil and gas company

- Company type: Subsidiary
- Industry: Petroleum industry
- Founded: 1997, Tehran, Iran
- Owner: Naftiran Intertrade and National Iranian Oil Company

PetroPars (Persian: پتروپارس) is an Iranian oil and gas engineering services company, which is a subsidiary of NICO and a subsidiary of the National Iranian Oil Company.

== History ==
Petropars Company was established in 1997 by the Naftiran Intertrade (subsidiary of the National Iranian Oil Company) with the aim of implementing the development plan of South Pars Phase 1 as an Iranian capital general contractor company using the buyback method. The company's headquarters is located in Tehran. Petropars' main activity so far has been focused on the development of gas fields, the bulk of which relates to the development projects of Phases 1, 6, 7, 8, 11, 12 and 19 of the South Pars gas field. Other projects carried out by this company include the development of Kish gas field, the development of Farzad gas field, as well as the development of Cabinda North field and revamping an oil export terminal in Venezuela.

Between 2008 and 2009, Petropars progressed towards privatization, and in the first stage, the Privatization Organization estimated the base price of 61% of its shares, equivalent to 2120 billion Iranian Rial, which was transferred to a consortium consisting of Khatam al-Anbiya Construction Headquarters, and Astan Quds Razavi, [8] but after a while, due to non-fulfillment of commitments and invalidity of bank documents, this contract was not implemented.
