= MV Sorocaima =

History
- Name: Colon (2020–present); Arita (2015–2020); Sorocaima (2015); IMICO Bushehr (2013–2015)
- Owner: Petróleos de Venezuela, S.A.
- Port of registry: Togo (2020–present); Venezuela (2020); Panama (2017–2020); Iran (2015–2017); Venezuela (2015)
- Builder: SADRA, Iran
- Yard number: 85505
- Launched: 24 July 2012
- In service: 2018–present
- Identification: IMO number: 9503574; MMSI number: 671268100; Callsign: 5VHZ7

General characteristics
- Type: Aframax
- Tonnage: 64,121 GT; 113,000 DWT
- Length: 250 m (820 ft 3 in)
- Beam: 44 m (144 ft 4 in)
- Height: 21 m (68 ft 11 in)

MV Colon , previously Arita and Sorocaima, is a crude oil tanker of the Venezuelan PDVSA.

Launched in 2012 by Iranian shipyard SADRA in Bushehr, it was the first Aframax built in the country, as well as the largest ship ever produced in the whole Middle East.

== Construction ==
In 2009, the national Venezuelaian oil company PDVSA signed an agreement with Iran Marine Industrial Company (SADRA), to build four Aframax tankers at an estimated cost of $200 million. While the shipbuilding company was under sanctions imposed by the U.S. Treasury Department, it launched the vessel Sorocaima on 24 July 2012. In October 2013, Reuters reported that oil tankers ordered by PDVSA, including Sorocaima, had not been delivered albeit being completed. Qobad Choubdar, head of SADRA's board of directors told media that delivery of the vessel has been delayed "because the buyer failed to meet its financial commitment and negotiations are underway to settle the issue".

== Service ==
Chris Biggers wrote in Bellingcat that AIS data indicates that the vessel has been berthing in Bushehr since 2014, and as of November 2015 she was flying the Iranian flag under the name Arita. He commented that she may have been enlisted into Iran's own commercial fleet. Shipping news service TradeWinds reported in January 2018 that the ship has finally entered service with Malaysian ownership and Hong Kong management, later disclosing in February 2019 that it has officially joined the fleet of PDVSA.
