= Madras Fertilizers =

Public fertilizer manufacturer in India

Madras Fertilizers Limited (MFL)
- Company type: Public
- Traded as: BSE: 590134; NSE: MADRASFERT
- Industry: Fertilizer
- Founded: 1966
- Headquarters: Manali, Chennai, Tamil Nadu, India
- Key people: Manoj Kumar Jain (Chairman and MD)
- Products: Fertilizers, agrochemical
- Owner: Government of India (59.5%); Naftiran Intertrade (25.77%)
- Website: www.madrasfert.co.in

Madras Fertilizers Limited (MFL) is an Indian public sector undertaking engaged in the manufacture of ammonia, urea and complex fertilizers in Manali, Chennai.

== History ==
Madras Fertilizers was incorporated in December 1966 as a joint venture between the Government of India (GOI) and Amoco, with the GOI holding 51% of the equity share capital. The company is the first public sector undertaking in the fertilizer industry to receive ISO 9002 certification.
