= Tabnak gas field =

Gas field in Fars Province, Iran

Tabnak
- Country: Iran
- Region: Fars province
- Offshore/onshore: onshore
- Operator: National Iranian Oil Company

Field history
- Discovery: 1967
- Start of production: 1980

Production
- Current production of gas: 43×10^{6} m^{3}/d 1.5×10^{9} cu ft/d 15.7×10^{9} m^{3}/a (550×10^{9} cu ft/a)
- Estimated gas in place: 857×10^{9} m^{3} 30×10^{12} cu ft

The Tabnak gas field is an Iranian natural gas field discovered in 1967 that began production in 1980 and produces natural gas and condensates. The total proven reserves of the Tabnak gas field are around 30 trillion cubic feet (857 billion m^{3}), and production was estimated to be around 1.5 billion cubic feet/day (43 million m^{3}) in 2000.
