= Ferdows Field =

Iranian oil field in the Persian Gulf

- Location within Iran
- Country: Iran
- Offshore/onshore: Offshore
- Coordinates: 27°59′00″N 50°49′00″E

Field history
- Discovery: 2003

Production
- Estimated oil in place: 38,000 million barrels (~5.2×10^{9} t)
- Estimated gas in place: 300×10^{9} m^{3} (11×10^{12} cu ft)

Ferdows is a giant oil and gas field of Iran, located in the Persian Gulf, 190 kilometres (120 mi) south-east from the city of Bushehr and 85 kilometres (53 mi) from the coast. It was explored in 2003. Prior to 2007, it was among the three largest in the world after Al Ghawar and Burgan.

Ferdows is associated with the deposits of Mound and Zagheh and their stocks are recorded together. Ferdows has a gas cap.

Geological reserves are estimated at 38 billion barrels or 6.3 billion tonnes of oil and 300 billion cubic metres of natural gas. Thus, the main reserves are in the field of Ferdows: 30,6 billion barrels, Mound field contains 6.63 billion barrels, Zagheh field - 1,3 billion barrels.

== Development ==
On November 21, 2010, the CEO of Iran's Pars Oil and Gas Company (POGC) announced the discovery of a new oil layer in the ferdowsi gas feild, estimated to hold about 34 billion barrels of oil in place.

== See also ==
- List of oil fields
