= Naftiran Intertrade =

Swiss-Iranian oil company

Naftiran Intertrade Company limited
- Type: Private company/limited, subsidiary
- Industry: Oil and gas
- Founded: 1991; 35 years ago
- Headquarters: Pully, Switzerland
- Key people: Ali Akbar Pourebrahim (CEO)
- Products: Petroleum Marketing
- Services: Trading/General contracting
- Revenue: US$21.9 billion (2008)
- Net income: $134 million (2008)
- Parent: NIOC
- Website: www.nico-intl.ir

Naftiran Intertrade Company S.à r.l. (NICO) is a Swiss-based subsidiary of the National Iranian Oil Company (NIOC). NICO is a general contractor for the oil and gas industry. NIOC buys the vast majority of Iran's gasoline imports. NICO is a key player in Iran's energy sector.

== History ==
Naftiran Trading Services (NTS) was established in Jersey, Channel Islands (United Kingdom) in 1991. The intention was to start trading crude oil and products, as well as to create a competitive opportunity for the investment in oil and gas projects, as well as to play an active role in world energy security. In June 2003, a decision was made by NICOs management to transfer the whole NTS activities to a newly established company named Naftiran Intertrade Co (Sàrl), in Lausanne, Switzerland.

Petro Suisse Intertrade Company (SA), Hong Kong Intertrade, Noor Energy (Malaysia) Ltd and Petro Energy Intertrade (Dubai), all alleged front companies for NIOC/NICO, have been sanctioned by the United States in 2012.

=== Revenues ===
From 2005 to 2008, NICO's revenue increased by 50%, from $14.7 billion to $21.9 billion, while its net income rose from $129 million to $134 million.

== Subsidiaries ==
=== Petropars ===
Petropars is a general contractor for the oil & gas industry.

=== PetroIran ===
Petroiran Development Company (a.k.a. PetroIran or PEDCO) is a general offshore contractor. PEDCO was initially formed to be the Iranian partner of foreign contractors with a 10% share in each buy-back contract.

=== Iranian Oil Company (IOC) ===
IOC is in charge of Rhum gasfield in the United Kingdom. Iran owns 50% of the offshore gas field of Rhum in the North Sea, which is Britain's largest untapped gas field. It is a joint-venture with BP worth $1 million a day at June 15, 2010 spot prices.

=== Foreign participation ===
- Iran has 10% joint-venture participation with BP and other foreign oil companies in Azerbaijani Shah Deniz gas field, producing 8 billion cubic meters of gas per year, worth up to a reported $2.4 billion per year.
- As at 2010, NICO is a shareholder in BP, holding 24,683,858 shares of the company, worth approximately $775 million, and representing 0.8% of the company's common stock.
- NICO also holds a 25.77% stake in Indian public sector fertilizer company Madras Fertilizers.

== See also ==
- National Iranian Oil Company - (NICO's parent company)
- Petroleum industry in Iran
- Energy in Iran
