= Sardar-e Jangal gas field =

Iranian gas field in the Caspian Sea

Sardar-e Jangal
- Country: Iran
- Region: Caspian Sea
- Offshore/onshore: offshore
- Operator: National Iranian Oil Company

Field history
- Discovery: 2012
- Start of production: 2012

Production
- Current production of gas: 70×10^{6} m^{3}/d 2.45×10^{9} cu ft/d 25.6×10^{9} m^{3}/a (900×10^{9} cu ft/a)
- Estimated oil in place: 282 million tonnes (~ 300×10^{3} m^{3} or 2 million bbl)
- Estimated gas in place: 1.43×10^{12} m^{3} 50×10^{12} cu ft

The Sardar-e Jangal gas field is an Iranian natural gas field that was discovered in 2012. Located at depth of 700m in water, it began production in 2012 and produces natural gas and condensates. The total proven reserves of the Sardar-e Jangal gas field, as specified by the Iranian Ministry of Petroleum, are around 50 trillion cubic feet (1.4 trillion m^{3}), however, estimates from the operator later placed reserves at 5 trillion cubic feet, and production is slated to be around 2.45 billion cubic feet/day (70 million m^{3}).
