= North Drilling =

Iranian oil and gas company

North Drilling Company
- Type: Private company
- Traded as: TSE: HSHM1; ISIN: IRO1HSHM0008
- Industry: Oilfield services
- Founded: 1999
- Headquarters: Tehran, Iran
- Key people: Managing Director: Roohollah Abdi
- Services: Onshore and offshore drilling services
- Net income: $100 million (2010)
- Website: www.ndco.ir

North Drilling Company (Persian: حفاری شمال, Hefari-ye Shimal) is an Iranian company specialized in drilling oil and gas wells and its services in all regions of Iran and world, to global customers. The company was privatized in June 2009. As of February 2010, Mehr Eghtesad, a quasi-government investment company, owned 20% of its shares on the Tehran Stock Exchange.

The company owned nine land rigs and three jackup rigs during these years and is managing drilling operation in Persian Gulf, Caspian sea, and Kuzestan, Ilam, Khorasan, Bushehr and Fars provinces of Iran.

In 2009, SADRA launched a domestically built semi-floatable drilling rig for the Caspian Sea owned by NIOC (National Iranian Oil Company). The semi-submersible platform is able to operate at water depths up to 1,030 metres (3,380 ft) and can drill down to 6,000 metres (20,000 ft) under the seabed. Iran-Alborz (from 2010 called Iran Amirkabir) is operated by Iran North Drilling Co.

North Drilling Company and China Petroleum Technology Development Corporation (CPTDC) signed a $143 million contract to set up a drilling rig in the Persian Gulf by 2011. Two of those drilling rigs were delivered to Iran in 2011 and 2012, named as SAHAR I and SAHAR II. Despite government policies for self-sufficiency, the North Drilling Company of Iran has scrapped a deal with domestic manufacturers in 2013 and has signed a contract with Chinese manufacturers to build 14 onshore and offshore drilling rigs worth $850 million.

== Connections to Iranian government ==
On April 23, 2014, North Drilling Company was listed by the European Union as an entity linked to Iranian nuclear or ballistic missile activities. The company has since been removed from the list in 2016, as part of the Joint Comprehensive Plan of Action. North Drilling Company is also indirectly owned by the Mostazafan Foundation, which is controlled by the government of Iran.

== Shareholders ==
1- Iran Leading Financial and Investment Company-Private Joint-Stock Company

2- Armed Forces Pension Fund

3- Sabbatamin Investment Company - Public Joint Stock Company -

4- Iran Health Insurance Organization

5- Tamin Oil and Gas Petrochemical Investment Company

6- Iranian Health Insurance Capital Management Company

7- Eurasian Economic Tadbirgaran Company

== See also ==
- National Iranian Oil Company
- Privatization in Iran
- List of companies in Iran
