= Asalouyeh Airport =

Asaluyeh Airport (closed)
- IATA: ~~YEH~~; ICAO: ~~OIBI~~

Summary
- Airport type: Public
- Owner: IRIAF
- Serves: Asaluyeh, Iran
- Elevation AMSL: 15 ft / 5 m
- Coordinates: 27°28′53″N 052°36′55″E

Map
- Location of airport in Iran

Runways
Direction	Length		Surface
Direction	m	ft	Surface
12/30	3,604	11,824	closed

Asaluyeh Airport (IATA: ~~YEH~~, ICAO: ~~OIBI~~) is located near Asaluyeh, Bushehr province, Iran. Owned by IRIAF, it was open to civil aviation at the time when economic activity around the PSEEZ necessitated establishment of an air link for the region. The airport was operational until the new Persian Gulf Airport (IATA: PGU, ICAO: OIBP) opened to traffic in July 2006, replacing Asalouyeh Airport.

== See also ==
- List of airports in Iran
