= Khangiran gas field =

Gas field in Iran

Khangiran
- Country: Iran
- Region: Razavi Khorasan Province
- Offshore/onshore: onshore
- Operator: National Iranian Oil Company

Field history
- Discovery: 1967
- Start of production: 1980

Production
- Current production of gas: 17×10^{6} m^{3}/d 600×10^{6} cu ft/d 6.2×10^{9} m^{3}/a (220×10^{9} cu ft/a)
- Estimated gas in place: 480×10^{9} m^{3} 17×10^{12} cu ft

The Khangiran gas field is an Iranian natural gas field that was discovered in 1967. It began production in 1980 and produces natural gas and condensates. The total proven reserves of the Khangiran gas field are around 17 trillion cubic feet (480 billion m^{3}) and production is slated to be around 600 million cubic feet/day (17 million m^{3}).
