= Société à responsabilité limitée =

Type of company in the Francophone world and Alberta, Canada

In France and other French-speaking countries, a société à responsabilité limitée (French pronunciation: [sɔsjete a ʁɛspɔ̃sabilite limite], abbreviated as SARL, S.à r.l. [ɛsaɛʁɛl] and roughly translatable in English as "private limited company") is a type of business corporation where the liability of the members does not extend beyond the capital already contributed. Because of its limited liability and separate legal personality, it is closely comparable to a private limited company.

The term SARL first arose out of a statute dated May 23, 1863, but at that time, it referred to a form of joint-stock company unrelated to the modern SARL.

The current SARL was developed in Germany as the Gesellschaft mit beschränkter Haftung by an 1892 Bill. The SARL has been a legally recognized corporate structure in France since 1925.

== History and consequences of "limited liability" ==
The concept of liability limitation and the promulgation thereof in 19th century law (see French Bills of May 1863 and July 1867, and the English Joint-Stock Company Acts of 1856 and 1862) is, according to Harari (2011), "one of humanity's most ingenious inventions":

"Peugeot is a creation of our collective imagination. Lawyers refer to it as a legal fiction. Peugot belongs to a particular kind of legal fiction, that of the limited liability company. The idea behind these companies is among one of humanity's most ingenious inventions."

— Harari, Harari, Y. N. (2022). Sapiens : Une brève histoire de l'humanité. Albin Michel. Harari then explains the advantages of this type of structure:

"If a car broke down, the buyer could sue Peugeot, but not Armand Peugeot. If the company borrowed millions before going bankrupt, Armand Peugeot wouldn't owe a single franc to the creditors. After all, the loan was given to Peugeot the company – not to Armand Peugeot, the homo sapiens shareholder."

— Harari, Harari, Y. N. (2022). Sapiens : Une brève histoire de l'humanité. Albin Michel

== Legal principles ==
In French law, a SARL is governed by various provisions of the Code de commerce (Commercial Code):

- articles L223-1 to L223-43, which concern the incorporation and operation thereof; and
- articles L241-1 to L241-9, which prescribe penal offences to which it is subject.

The key distinction between a SARL and the société anonyme (public limited company) lies in its governance structure, which is far simpler than that of a société anonyme. A SARL is led by a manager, who reports annually to a general meeting of the shareholders, whereas a société anonyme is led by a CEO, who reports to a board of directors whose members report, in turn, to the general meeting of shareholders.

Since a July 1985 Bill, there are two variants of the SARL, namely: the SARL pluripersonnelle (multi-person SARL), having at least two shareholders; and the entreprise unipersonnelle à responsabilité limitée (one-person limited liability company), having a single shareholder. Despite its name, a société d'exercice (professional practice company) is not a SARL, but instead a société d'exercice liberal (learned profession company). Today, there are over 2 million SARLs in France, close to 80,000 having been created in 2022 alone. The model is particularly well-suited for small- and medium-sized businesses.

A SARL can take on various forms depending on the business activity and the shareholders involved, offering tax advantages in particular. Examples include: the SARL à capital variable (variable capital SARL), the SARL de presse (media SARL) and the SARL de famille (family-owned SARL).

== Legal characteristics ==
=== Capital ===
The amount of capital of a SARL is to be determined by its by-laws, pursuant to article L223-2 of the Code de commerce. The minimum capital was originally set at 20,000 francs by a July 1967 Bill. It was raised to 50,000 by Bill 84-148 in March 1984, and later, with the transition to the euro, set at €7,500. Today, the minimum capital requirement has been abolished, such amount being freely determined at the time of incorporation.

==== Abolition of minimum capital ====
The Loi pour l'initiative économique (Economic Initiative Act) of August 1, 2003 repealed the €7,500 threshold, so it is now possible to incorporate a SARL with merely 1 euro in capital. However, share capital serves as a sign of credibility for banks, lenders and creditors and a signal of financial health for shareholders, being only liable for loss up to amount of their contribution. Still, capital alone is an imperfect indicator of a SARL's health: its financial statements and balance sheets paint a clearer picture.

Capital is divided into shares, the distribution of which is recorded in the by-laws. This structure permits the organization of power within the company (majority versus minority shareholders), which is important for voting on decisions. All shares must be fully subscribed by the shareholders. Shares representing contributions in kind must be fully paid up forthwith.

Contributions in cash must be paid up to at least one-fifth of their value at time of incorporation. The remainder may be paid in installments, at the manager's decision, within five years of the SARL becoming registered in the commercial and corporate registry. However, the capital must be fully paid up before any new shares can be issued, which must be paid up to at least one-quarter of their value in cash (as per Bill 2012-387 of March 2012), or else the issuance thereof shall be void.

Contributions in kind (assets, stocks, receivables) must be made immediately.

Contributions in industry (skills, know-how, expertise) are not permitted, which, while not counting towards the share capital, do grant shareholder status or a right to share in profits. The by-laws may specify how such contributions are recognized and how shares in industry are allocated.

=== Shareholders (Natural or Legal Persons) ===
- Minimum: 2 (article L223-1, Code de commerce).
- Maximum: 100.

Shareholder responsibility is limited to amount of each's contributions.

=== Collective Decisions ===
- Decisions which amend the by-laws are called "special collective decisions".
- Decisions which do not amend the by-laws are called "regular collective decisions".
- Collective decisions are generally made at general meetings.

==== For SARLs incorporated before August 4, 2005 ====
- Regular meetings: No quorum required.
  - First Call: Majority of share capital.
  - Second Call: Majority of votes cast by shareholders present or proxied.
- Special meetings: No quorum required.
  - Three-fourths majority of the share capital.

Any clause in the by-laws inconsistent therewith is void.

==== For SARLs incorporated after August 4, 2005 ====
- Regular meetings: No quorum required.
  - First Call: Majority of share capital.
  - Second Call: Majority of votes cast by shareholders present or proxied.
- Special meetings:
  - First call: one-fourth of the share capital.
  - Second call: One-fifth of share capital.
  - Two-thirds majority of the share capital held by shareholders present or proxied.

Any clause in the by-laws inconsistent therewith is void.

==== Other restrictions ====
Unanimous decision is required for:

- transformation of a SARL into a société en nom collectif (general partnership), société en commandite par actions (limited partnership) société en commandite simple (simplified limited partnership) or société par actions simplifiée (joint-stock company);
- changing the company's nationality; or
- increasing shareholder obligations.

Double majority (by number and capital) is required for:

- transfer of shares.

Simply majority (half of share capital) is required for:

- capital increase by incorporated reserves; or
- transformation into a société anonyme if the company's equity exceeds €750,000 in the latest balance sheet.

=== Incorporation of a SARL ===
==== By-laws ====
1. General contractual elements
  - Consent:
    - Subject to general contract law.
  - Legal capacity:
    - For associés non commerçants (non-trading individuals), legal capacity is sufficient to become a shareholder. Emancipated minors, protected adults, two spouses, foreign nationals or bodies corporate may become shareholders.
    - Neither incompatibility nor prohibition limits access to a SARL, but individuals cannot have had their civil rights suspected, and certificate of non-conviction is required, pursuant to Article 128-1 of the Code de commerce, which was relaxed by the Loi de modernisation de l'économie (Economic Modernization Act) of August 2008.
  - Business activity:
    - Must be commercial in nature, regardless of type of activity.
    - Certain types of businesses are prohibited from becoming SARLs, including insurance companies, capitalization companies, banks and tobacco shops. Entertainment companies have been allowed to become SARLs since 1988.
    - Some activities are reserved for other corporate forms, e.g., securities portfolio management and investment companies.
    - Some activities are exclusive to SARLs, e.g., real estate management companies.
    - Some activities may be effected under SARL status but with certain conditions thereon, e.g., accounting firms.
2. Specific contractual elements:
  - There must be between 2 and 100 shareholders. If the number falls to 1, the SARL becomes an entreprise unipersonnelle à responsabilité limitée. If it exceeds 100, the SARL has one year to reduce the number; otherwise, it will be dissolved or converted into a public limited company.
  - Capital is freely set in the by-laws (there previously being a minimum of €7,500). It can be fully or partially paid out over a maximum of five years. Capital can be increased after incorporation.

==== Capital contributions ====
There are three types of SARL contributions:

1. Contributions in cash:
  - At least one-fifth must be paid at time of incorporation.
  - The remainder can be paid in one or more installments within five years, as decided by the manager.
  - Funds must be deposited within eight days with a notary, bank or the Caisse des dépôts et consignations (Deposit and Consignment Office).
  - If the company is not incorporated within six months, the funds may be reclaimed.
2. Contributions in kind:
  - Must be evaluated and detailed in the by-laws.
  - A Contributions Auditor is appointed unanimously by future shareholders or by court order.
  - The Auditor's report is annexed to the by-laws.
  - However, this requirement is waived if no individual contribution exceeds €30,000 and the total in-kind contributions are less than half the capital.
  - If no Auditor is appointed or if the value used exceeds the Auditor's recommendation, shareholders are jointly liable to third parties.
3. Contributions in industry:
  - Allowed since 2001 under the Loi relative aux nouvelles régulations économiques (New Economic Regulations Act).
  - Do not count toward share capital but grant shareholder status and profit-sharing rights.
  - The by-laws define the terms of compensation. If not specified, the contributor receives a share of profits and losses equal to that of the shareholder with the fewest shares.

==== Share Capital and Shares ====
- Subscription and full payment of shares must occur at the time of incorporation (i.e., when the by-laws are signed).
- The distribution of shares must be recorded in the by-laws.
- Profit and loss sharing does not have to be proportional to shareholding, but loss participation cannot exceed the value of the shares held.
- Other essential elements of the company contract include profit-sharing, affectio societatis (mutual intent to form a company), company name and duration.

==== Formalities and Public Disclosure Requirements ====
- By-laws:
  - Must be ratified, written (either as a private agreement or by notarial deed) and signed by all shareholders.
  - In addition to the standard clauses required for any company, SARL by-laws must include:
    - a valuation of contributions in kind,
    - the appointment of managers and the distribution of powers,
    - rules for the transfer of shares,
    - ways of consulting shareholders, and
    - method of profit distribution.
  - Appendices thereto should include:
    - the Contributions Auditor's report, and
    - a list of actions taken on behalf of the company during its formation.
- Acts performed on company's behalf prior to registration
  - Any individual acting on behalf of a SARL that has not yet been incorporated and registered is jointly and personally liable for the consequences of their actions — unless the company, once incorporated and registered, formally adopts those commitments. In that case, the commitments are considered to have been made by the company from the outset.
  - There are two automatic-adoption mechanisms:
    - acts appended to the by-laws, and
    - acts explicitly mentioned in the by-laws.
- Public Disclosure
  - The by-laws must be filed with the Recette des impôts (Tax Office) within 30 days of signing.
  - A notice must be published in:
    - the Journal d'annonces légales (Legal Announcements Journal), and
    - the Bulletin officiel des annonces civiles et commerciales (Official Bulletin of Civil and Commercial Notices).
  - The company must be registered with the Registre du commerce et des sociétés (Trade and Companies Register).

=== Appointment of Managers ===
- Leaders of a SARL are called managers. Every SARL must have at least one manager. The manager(s) may be appointed in the by-laws (referred to as statutory managers) or by a decision of the shareholders representing more than half of the share capital — unless the by-laws require a higher majority.
- Only natural persons with full civil rights may serve as SARL managers; bodies corporate cannot be appointed.

=== Shareholders of a SARL ===
- SARL shareholders (between 2 and 100) do not have the legal status of merchants and may carry out paid activities within the company.
- As with any corporate structure, shareholders have both rights and obligations.

=== Capital Increase, Reduction, Transformation, and Dissolution ===
==== Capital Increase ====
The July 1966 Bill included few specific provisions for SARL capital increases, so the rules for public limited companies are often used as a reference.

1. Increase through contributions
  - Contributions in cash:
    - A capital increase must be approved by a special general meeting, for it involves amending the by-laws, thus requiring a three-fourths majority of the share capital. If allowed by the bylaws, the decision may be made via written consultation.
    - The first consultation sets the key terms (amount, number of shares, premium, etc.).
    - The manager handles subscriptions and fund collection, which must be fully paid immediately.
    - The second consultation finalizes the increase and updates the bylaws.
    - If the increase is not completed within six months of the first deposit, contributors may request a refund.
    - If a third party subscribes, approval is required.
    - For spouses under joint ownership, the other spouse must be notified, or else the contribution is void.
    - A 25% income tax credit is granted for cash contributions by individual shareholders, provided the shares are held for five years.
  - Disclosure requirements:
    - Register the meeting minutes
    - Publish a notice in a legal announcements journal.
    - File documents with the commercial court registry (minutes, updated by-laws, compliance declaration).
    - Submit a modification request to the Trade and Companies Register.
    - Publish in the Official Bulletin.
  - Contributions in kind:
    - Must be documented in a written contract. The process is similar to that used at incorporation:
    - Contributions (e.g., business assets, lease rights) must be evaluated in a report annexed to the bylaws by a contributions auditor.
    - The contribution contract must be approved by the shareholders.
    - Publicity requirements are the same as for cash contributions, with the additional filing of the auditor's report.
  - Debt-to-equity conversion:
    - Can be done either as an in-kind contribution or through offsetting. The debts must be certain and due, and the possibility must be approved by the special general meeting.
2. Increase by incorporating reserves, premiums or profits
  - This type of capital increase may be approved by shareholders representing at least half of the share capital (not three-fourths). The formalities are the same as for a cash contribution increase.

==== Capital reduction and loss ====
The August 2003 Bill repealed the requirement that, unless the SARL is transformed into another corporate form, a reduction of capital below the legal minimum could only be decided on the condition that it would be followed by a capital increase to restore the minimum.

The rules for capital reduction in SARLs now follow those applicable to sociétés anonymes:

- Nature and purpose of operation:
  1. Voluntary reduction: The company may reduce its capital to return excess funds to shareholders if it deems its capital too high relative to its cash needs. This is rare and typically occurs in companies with reduced activity.
  2. Loss-related reduction: If the company has suffered losses that cannot realistically be offset by future profits, and dividend distribution becomes impossible, it may reduce capital to clean up its financial situation.
- Distinction from capital amortization: Capital amortization involves reimbursing shareholders part or all of the nominal value of their shares. It is decided by a special general meeting and funded from profits or reserves. It is considered an advance on the liquidation surplus and does not change the capital amount.
- Conditions: The special general meeting must decide based on reports from the statutory auditors. Shareholder equality must be preserved. Creditors with claims predating the decision cannot oppose a loss-motivated capital reduction. Otherwise, they have 20 days after the meeting to object in commercial court, which may reject the objection, order repayment or require guarantees.

==== Transformation ====
1. To a société en nom collectif or a société civile:
  - Requires unanimous shareholder approval.
2. To a société anonyme:
  - Requires approval by shareholders holding at least three-fourths of the share capital.
  - The last two fiscal year balance sheets must be approved.
  - A report on the company's situation is required from a court-appointed transformation auditor (who may be the statutory auditor).
  - The auditor assesses the value of assets and any special benefits to shareholders or third parties and confirms that equity is at least equal to the share capital.

The SARL must then comply with rules which apply to sociétés anonymes: at least 7 shareholders, minimum capital, appointment of a Contributions Auditor, conversion of shares into stock and updated public disclosures.

==== Dissolution ====
- Common causes:
  - expiry of the company's term,
  - fulfillment or extinction of its purpose,
  - court-ordered liquidation,
  - annulment of the company contract, and
  - decision of shareholders.
- Other causes:
  - Automatically dissolved after one year if:
    - the number of shareholders exceeds 100,
    - equity falls below the legal minimum, or
    - more than half the capital is lost.

A SARL is not dissolved by the death, incapacity or personal bankruptcy of a shareholder.

== Tax Status ==
By default, a SARL is subject to corporate income tax.

However, it may elect to pay personal income tax in two cases:

1. If all shareholders are natural persons from the same family (spouses, civil partners or children). This option is not available for SARLs with liberal professional activities.
2. If shareholders are not all family members, provided that:
  - more than 50% of the capital is held by natural persons,
  - the manager and their family hold at least 34% of the capital,
  - the company is less than 5 years old,
  - it operates a commercial, craft, agricultural or learned activity, and
  - it meets thresholds of fewer than 50 employees, less than €10 million in revenue and total assets.
  - This option is valid for 5 fiscal years.

If a SARL pays personal income tax, only its shareholders are taxed, not the SARL itself, which ensures fiscal transparency. Each shareholder declares their share of profits, even if not distributed. No additional tax is due when profits are later distributed.

SARLs are subject to VAT if they engage in genuine economic activity (excluding purely financial holding companies).

== Social Security ==
Social security may apply to SARL managers under two systems:

- Minority or equal-share manager (holding ≤50% of shares or not a shareholder):
  - Covered by the employee social security system if paid.
  - Not subject to contributions if unpaid.
  - Not considered an employee under labour law (no unemployment rights or collective agreement protections).
- Majority manager (holding >50% of shares):
  - Considered a self-employed worker, thus subject to the social security system, whether paid or not.

If there are multiple managers, their shares are combined to determine majority status. A manager with less than 50% may still be considered majority if he or she is part of a management cadre that collectively forms the majority.

A minority manager may also be an employee if he or she:

- holds an actual job,
- has a role which is distinct from management,
- is paid a salary, and
- works under a relationship of subordination.

A majority manager cannot also be an employee in the same company due to the lack of reporting relationship.
