= Farzad-B =

Natural gas field in Iran

- Country: Iran
- Region: Persian Gulf
- Location: Farzad-B (Iran)
- Block: Farsi
- Offshore/onshore: offshore
- Operator: Petropars Group (National Iranian Oil Company)

Field history
- Discovery: 2008

Production
- Estimated gas in place: 21,680×10^{9} cu ft (614×10^{9} m^{3})

'Farzad-B is an off-shore natural gas field 20 kilometres off Farsi Island in Iran. The total in-place reserves of the gas field are around 21.68 trillion cubic foot (6.14×10^{11} m^{3}) of which around 60 percent is recoverable.

The gas field was discovered in 2008 by a consortium of three Indian companies, led by the state-owned ONGC Videsh with a 40% stake; the other companies were Indian Oil Corporation (40%) and Oil India (20%). The consortium had signed an exploration agreement in 2002 for the Farsi block, where the gas field was found. The gas field was expected to produce 1.1 billion cubic foot (31,000,000 m^{3}) of gas per day after the first phase of development. Negotiations between the consortium and the National Iranian Oil Company (NIOC) to develop the gas field stalled due to secondary sanctions against Iran by the United States and the European Union in the early 2010s. Following the lifting of sanctions after the Joint Comprehensive Plan of Action was signed in July 2015, the consortium was close to an agreement to invest $US5 billion to develop the gas field. After the United States withdrawal from the Joint Comprehensive Plan of Action in May 2018, and the reinstatement of U.S. sanctions against Iran, the negotiations between the consortium and NIOC broke down. In January 2020, Iran said that it would develop the field on its own, and that it may allow Indian involvement later.

On 17 May 2021, the Iranian oil ministry said that a $1.78 billion contract had been signed with NIOC subsidiary Petropars Group to develop the gas field. The daily gas production target for the first five years is 28 million cubic foot (790,000 m^{3}), with the gas to be processed at Kangan, and the resulting gas condensates to be further processed in South Pars refineries.
