= Aframax =

Size class of oil tanker

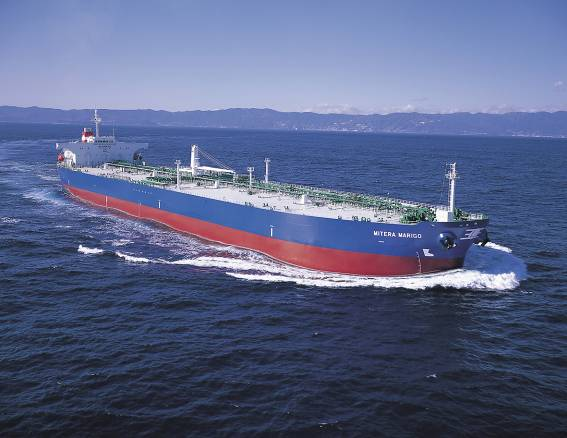
Aframax tanker Mitera Marigo

An Aframax vessel is an oil tanker with a deadweight between 80,000 and 120,000 metric tonnes. The term is based on the Average Freight Rate Assessment (AFRA), a tanker rate system created in 1954 by Shell Oil to standardize shipping contract terms.

Due to their favorable size, Aframax tankers can serve most ports in the world. These vessels serve regions that do not have very large ports or offshore oil terminals to accommodate Very Large Crude Carriers and Ultra-Large Crude Carriers. Aframax tankers are optimal for short- to medium-haul crude oil transportation. Aframax class tankers are largely used in the basins of the Black Sea, the North Sea, the Caribbean Sea, the South and East China Seas, and the Mediterranean. Non–OPEC exporting countries may require the use of this type of vessel because the harbors and canals through which these countries export their oil are too small to accommodate the Suezmax or the larger categories.

An Aframax tanker carries 600,000 barrels of oil as compared to larger tankers that may carry up to 2 million barrels of oil.

== See also ==
- Cargo ship § Size categories
- List of Panamax ports
- Oil tanker § Size categories
