= Iranian Offshore Engineering and Construction Company =

Iranian Offshore Engineering and Construction Company (IOEC) is the first Iranian general contractor in the oil and gas industries. IOEC specializes in offshore EPC project. The company was established in 1991 and operates mainly in the Persian Gulf, with its head office in Tehran.

IOEC designs, procures, constructs, installs and provides services for a range of offshore surface and partial subsurface infrastructure for the offshore oil and gas industries. IOEC is one of the largest integrated offshore and sub-sea pipe-laying companies in the Middle East. Iran is going to be self-sufficient in drilling of offshore wells up to certain depths (2009).

The company aims to extend its oil and gas activities in both onshore and offshore fields. In addition to mid-stream activities, IOEC intends to develop its up-stream operations. Development of the vessels and localizing the construction technology of drilling rigs include other objectives of this company. In 2016, IOEC stated that it will participate in projects in Europe and Africa.

== See also ==
- Petroleum industry in Iran
- Industry of Iran
