= GSP Jupiter =

Semi-submersible oil drilling rig

History
- Name: GSP Jupiter
- Owner: GSP Drilling
- Operator: Melrose Resources
- Port of registry: Malta
- Builder: Galați shipyard
- Completed: 1987
- Identification: IMO number: 8767642; MMSI number: 249298000; Callsign: 9HOX9
- Status: Operational

General characteristics
- Class & type: Jackup Independent Leg Cantilever Drilling Unit
- Tonnage: 1,900 GT
- Length: 52.4 m (172 ft)
- Beam: 40.8 m (134 ft)
- Height: 120 m (390 ft)
- Draft: 9.75 m (32.0 ft)
- Depth: 6.4 m (21 ft)
- Installed power: 8430 hp
- Capacity: Variable Deck Load: 1,900 t; Liquid Mud: 1,635 bbls (260 m^{3})
- Crew: 97

GSP Jupiter is a semi-submersible, jackup independent leg cantilever drilling rig operated by GSP Drilling, a Grup Servicii Petroliere subsidiary, and currently laid up in the port of Limassol.

== Description ==
GSP Jupiter drilling rig was designed by Sonnat Offshore and was built by Petrom at the Galați shipyard in 1987. The rig was completely reconstructed and refurbished in 2007 at a cost of US$55 million. The rig was owned and operated by Petrom from 1987 to 2005 when the company sold its six offshore platforms (including Atlas, Jupiter, Orizont, Prometeu and Saturn) to Grup Servicii Petroliere for US$100 million.

GSP Jupiter has a length of 52.4 metres (172 ft), breadth of 40.8 metres (134 ft), draft of 9.75 metres (32.0 ft), height of 120 metres (390 ft) and depth of 6.4 metres (21 ft). She has a maximum drilling depth of 9,100 metres (29,900 ft) and she could operate at a water depth of 91 metres (300 ft). As a drilling rig, GSP Jupiter is equipped with advanced drilling equipment and has to meet strict levels of certification under international law. GSP Jupiter is able to maneuver with its own engines (to counter drift and ocean currents), but for long-distance relocation it must be moved by specialist tugboats. The rig is capable of withstanding severe sea conditions including 12 metres (39 ft) waves and 155 kilometres per hour (96 mph) winds.

== Operations ==
Currently the GSP Jupiter is operated by the British company Melrose Resources which uses the drilling rig at its Black Sea oil and natural gas prospects. On 19 May 2010 the GSP Jupiter started a drilling program at the Kaliakra East gas field which is thought to have 59 bcft of natural gas. After finishing this program the rig will be moved to the Kavarna East gas field.
