= Hunayn =

Hunayn may refer to:

- Hunayn, Saudi Arabia, a location
- Battle of Hunayn, at Hunayn, Saudi Arabia
- Hunayn (name)
- PNS Hunain (D-164)
- PNS Hunain (2023)
