= GSP Prometeu =

History
- Name: GSP Prometeu
- Owner: GSP Drilling
- Operator: Melrose Resources
- Port of registry: Malta
- Builder: Galați shipyard
- Completed: 1984
- Identification: IMO number: 8767654; MMSI number: 249299000; Callsign: 9HOY9
- Status: Operational

General characteristics
- Class & type: Jackup Independent Leg Cantilever Drilling Unit
- Tonnage: 2,000 GT
- Length: 52.4 m (172 ft)
- Beam: 40.8 m (134 ft)
- Height: 120 m (390 ft)
- Draft: 9.75 m (32.0 ft)
- Depth: 6.4 m (21 ft)
- Installed power: 8430 hp
- Capacity: Variable Deck Load: 2,000 t; Liquid Mud: 1,880 bbls (299 m^{3})
- Crew: 98

GSP Prometeu is a jackup independent leg cantilever drilling rig operated by GSP Drilling, a Grup Servicii Petroliere subsidiary, and currently contracted by Melrose Resources for drilling in the Bulgarian section of the Black Sea. The drilling unit is registered in Malta.

== Description ==
GSP Prometeu drilling rig was designed by Sonnat Offshore and was built by Petrom at the Galați shipyard in 1982. The rig was completely reconstructed and refurbished in 2003 at a cost of US$35 million. The rig was owned and operated by Petrom from 1982 to 2005 when the company sold its six offshore platforms (including Atlas, Jupiter, Orizont, Prometeu and Saturn) to Grup Servicii Petroliere for US$100 million.

GSP Prometeu has a length of 52.4 metres (172 ft), breadth of 40.8 metres (134 ft), draft of 9.75 metres (32.0 ft), height of 120 metres (390 ft) and depth of 6.4 metres (21 ft). She has a maximum drilling depth of 6,100 metres (20,000 ft) and she could operate at a water depth of 91 metres (300 ft). As a drilling rig, GSP Prometeu is equipped with advanced drilling equipment and has to meet strict levels of certification under international law. GSP Prometeu is able to maneuver with its own engines (to counter drift and ocean currents), but for long-distance relocation it must be moved by specialist tugboats. The rig is capable of withstanding severe sea conditions including 12 metres (39 ft) waves and 155 kilometres per hour (96 mph) winds.

== Operations ==
Currently the GSP Prometeu is operated by the British company Melrose Resources which uses the drilling rig at its Black Sea oil and natural gas prospects. The rig is set to drill for natural gas in the Kaliakra 2 prospect.
