= Alina Gabriela Popa =

Romanian business executive (born 1977)

Alina Gabriela Popa (born 17 July 1977) is a Romanian business executive serving as Chief Financial Officer and member of the Executive Board of OMV Petrom.

== Early life and career ==
Popa graduated from the Bucharest Academy of Economic Studies in 1999. She is a member of several professional bodies, including the Association of Chartered Certified Accountants and the CAFR.

Popa began her career at Deloitte, Romania in audit and advisory services before joining OMV Petrom in 2006.

she served as the general manager and president of the board of directors for OMV Petrom Global Solutions, the shared services center operating under the parent entity OMV Group.

In 2018, the supervisory board of OMV Petrom officially designated Popa as the company's next chief financial officer and executive board member.

In 2019, she was appointed chief financial officer and member of the executive board of OMV Petrom.

She stepped into the role on April 17, 2019, succeeding Stefan Waldner. As CFO, she works alongside Chief Executive Officer Christina Verchere to direct the company's capital allocation, financial risk management, and overall strategic growth.
