= Slatina oil field =

Oil field in Romania

Slatina
- Country: Romania
- Region: Olt County
- Offshore/onshore: onshore
- Operator: Petrom

Field history
- Discovery: 1984
- Start of production: 1985

Production
- Current production of oil: 800 barrels per day (~40,000 t/a)
- Estimated oil in place: 20.8 million tonnes (~ 24.6×10^{6} m^{3} or 155 million bbl)

The Slatina oil field is an oil field located in Slatina, Olt County. It was discovered in 1984 and developed by Petrom. It began production in 1985 and produces oil and natural gas. The total proven reserves of the Slatina oil field are around 155 million barrels (20.8 million tonnes), and production is centered on 800 barrels per day (130 m^{3}/d).
