= PNS Hunain =

PNS Hunain is the name of the following ships of the Pakistan Navy:

- PNS Hunain (D-164), formerly USS Talbot, leased to Pakistan from April 1989 to May 1993.
- PNS Hunain (2023), a Yarmook-class corvette, in commission since 2024.
