= Petrom Brazi Power Station =

Brazi Power Plant
- Country: Romania
- Location: Prahova County
- Coordinates: 44.880334°N 25.99896°E
- Status: Operational
- Commission date: 2012
- Owner: Petrom

Thermal power station
- Primary fuel: Natural gas

Power generation
- Units operational: 2
- Nameplate capacity: 860 MW

The Petrom Brazi Power Station is one of the largest electricity producers in Romania, having 2 natural gas-fired groups of 430 MW each, totalling an installed capacity of 860 MW and an electricity generation capacity of around 6 TWh/year.

The power plant is situated in Prahova County (southern Romania) near Petrom's refinery in Brazi. The construction of the power plant began in 2009 and was completed in 2011 at a total cost of 530 million Euros.
