= GSP Orizont =

History
- Name: GSP Orizont
- Owner: GSP Drilling
- Operator: Iranian Offshore Engineering and Construction Company
- Port of registry: Malta
- Builder: Galați shipyard
- Completed: 1982
- Identification: IMO number: 7806934; MMSI number: 249313000; Callsign: 9HPG9
- Status: Operational

General characteristics
- Class & type: Jackup Independent Leg Cantilever Drilling Unit
- Tonnage: 2,000 GT
- Length: 52.4 m (171 ft 11 in)
- Beam: 40.8 m (133 ft 10 in)
- Height: 120 m (393 ft 8 in)
- Draft: 9.75 m (32 ft 0 in)
- Depth: 6.4 m (21 ft 0 in)
- Installed power: 8,430 hp (6,290 kW)
- Capacity: Variable deck load: 2,000 t (2,000 long tons; 2,200 short tons); Liquid mud: 1,880 bbl (299 m^{3})
- Crew: 92

GSP Orizont is a semi-submersible, jackup independent leg cantilever drilling rig operated by GSP Drilling, a Grup Servicii Petroliere subsidiary, and currently contracted by Iranian Offshore Engineering and Construction Company for drilling in the Iranian section of the Persian Gulf. The drilling unit is registered in Malta.

== Description ==
GSP Orizont drilling rig was designed by Sonnat Offshore and was built by Petrom at the Galați shipyard in 1982. The rig was completely reconstructed and refurbished in 2010 at a cost of US$50 million. The rig was owned and operated by Petrom from 1982 to 2005 when the company sold its six offshore platforms (including Atlas, Jupiter, Orizont, Prometeu and Saturn) to Grup Servicii Petroliere for US$100 million.

GSP Orizont has a length of 52.4 metres (172 ft), breadth of 40.8 metres (134 ft), draft of 9.75 metres (32.0 ft), height of 120 metres (390 ft) and depth of 6.4 metres (21 ft). She has a maximum drilling depth of 9,100 metres (29,900 ft) and she could operate at a water depth of 91 metres (300 ft). As a drilling rig, GSP Orizont is equipped with advanced drilling equipment and has to meet strict levels of certification under international law. GSP Orizont is able to maneuver with its own engines (to counter drift and ocean currents), but for long-distance relocation it must be moved by specialist tugboats. The rig is capable of withstanding severe sea conditions including 12 metres (39 ft) waves and 155 kilometres per hour (96 mph) winds.

== Operations ==
Currently the GSP Orizont is operated by the Iranian company Iranian Offshore Engineering and Construction Company which uses the drilling rig at its Persian Gulf oil and natural gas prospects.
