= Komsomolskoye oil field =

Oil field in Mangystau, Kazakhstan

Komsomolskoye Oil Field
- Country: Kazakhstan
- Region: Mangystau Province
- Offshore/onshore: onshore
- Operator: Petrom

Field history
- Discovery: 1984
- Start of development: 1984
- Start of production: 2005

Production
- Current production of oil: 10,000 barrels per day (~5.0×10^{5} t/a)
- Estimated oil in place: 16.8 million tonnes (~ 19.51×10^{6} m^{3} or 122.7 million bbl)

The Komsomolskoye Oil Field is an oil field located in Mangystau Province. It was discovered in 1984 and developed by Petrom. The oil field is operated and owned by Petrom. The total proven reserves of the Komsomolsky oil field are around 122.7 million barrels (16.8 million tonnes), and production is centered on 10,000 barrels per day (1,600 m^{3}/d).
