= Tasbulat oil field =

Oil field in Mangystau Province

Tasbulat Oil Field
- Country: Kazakhstan
- Region: Mangystau Province
- Offshore/onshore: onshore
- Operator: Petrom

Field history
- Discovery: 1997
- Start of development: 1997
- Start of production: 2009

Production
- Current production of oil: 4,000 barrels per day (~2.0×10^{5} t/a)
- Estimated oil in place: 22.1 million tonnes (~ 25.71×10^{6} m^{3} or 161.7 million bbl)

The Tasbulat Oil Field is an oil field located in Mangystau Province. It was discovered in 1997 and developed by Petrom. The oil field is operated and owned by Petrom. The total proven reserves of the Tasbulat oil field are around 161.7 million barrels (22.1 million tonnes), and production is centered on 4,000 barrels per day (640 m^{3}/d).
