= Buștenari-Runcu oil field =

Oil field in Romania

Buștenari-Runcu
- Country: Romania
- Region: Prahova County
- Offshore/onshore: onshore
- Operator: Petrom

Field history
- Discovery: 1989
- Start of development: 1989
- Start of production: 1995

Production
- Current production of oil: 17,600 barrels per day (~8.77×10^{5} t/a)
- Estimated oil in place: 33 million tonnes (~ 38×10^{6} m^{3} or 240 million bbl)

The Buștenari-Runcu oil field is an oil field located in Buștenari, Prahova County. It was discovered in 1989 and developed by Petrom. It began production in 1995 and produces oil. The total proven reserves of the Buștenari-Runcu oil field are around 240 million barrels (33 million tonnes), and production is centered on 17,600 barrels per day (2,800 m^{3}/d).
