= Missing Iranian oil rig =

The Missing Iranian oil rig or Fortuna rig, is a corruption scandal in which an oil rig, the GSP Fortuna, was bought by the Iranian government for US$88 million, but was never delivered. The case attracted major attention in Iran and abroad.

== Background ==
In 2012, the Iranian Offshore Engineering and Construction Company (IOEC) spent US$87 million to buy the GSP Fortuna, an oil rig built in 1985 in Argentina, and owned by Grup Servicii Petroliere (GSP), a Romanian oilfield service company. The deal was secured by a middleman, Reza Mostafavi Tabatabaei, by using a shell company in Dubai called Dean International Trading S.A. The cost of the rig was $67 million, but the IOEC agreed to pay $87 million - $20 million more than the rig's initial value, supposedly to bypass sanctions. However, Tabatabaei would later be accused of embezzlement by a former Iranian official, according to Reuters.

== The case ==
Later, Bijan Namdar Zangeneh, the Iranian oil minister, reported that a deal was made during Mahmoud Ahmadinejad's presidency that did not go through normal routes and that the rig was never delivered, with the Fortuna reportedly being transferred to the Gulf of Mexico instead. The semi-official Fars news agency reported of the arrest of Ata'ollah Mohajerani, the son of the former Minister of Culture by the authorities regarding this case. Zangeneh reported that Ahmadinejad personally ordered the purchase and specifically asked for it to be done through a middleman.

== Prosecution ==
On 7 August 2017, Abbas Jafari, Tehran's prosecutor, declared the indictment of six individuals involved in the scandal. Ali Taheri Motlagh, the former head of Iranian Offshore Engineering and Construction Co. was sentenced to 3 years of confinement. Morad Shirani, was sentenced to 6 months of prison and Reza Mostafavi Tabatabaei was sentenced to 3 years in prison. The sentences did not include financial compensation. Tehran's prosecutor added that they have urged the court to ensure that disciplinary action is taken against the suspects involved in the case according to Fars News Agency.
