= Delta VI oil field =

Black Sea oil field

Delta VI
- Country: Romania
- Region: Black Sea
- Offshore/onshore: offshore
- Operator: Petrom

Field history
- Discovery: 2007
- Start of development: 2009
- Start of production: 2009

Production
- Current production of oil: 3,400 barrels per day (~1.7×10^{5} t/a)
- Estimated oil in place: 4.1 million tonnes (~ 5×10^{6} m^{3} or 30 million bbl)

The Delta VI oil field is an oil field located on the continental shelf of the Black Sea. It was discovered in 2007 and developed by Petrom. It began production in 2009 and produces oil. The total proven reserves of the Delta VI oil field are around 30 million barrels (4.1 million tonnes), and production is centered on 3,400 barrels per day (540 m^{3}/d).
