= Turnu oil field =

Oil field in Romania

Turnu
- Country: Romania
- Region: Arad County
- Offshore/onshore: onshore
- Operator: Petrom

Field history
- Discovery: 1964
- Start of development: 1964
- Start of production: 1965

Production
- Current production of oil: 2,000 barrels per day (~100,000 t/a)
- Estimated oil in place: 7 million tonnes (~ 8.1×10^{6} m^{3} or 51 million bbl)
- Estimated gas in place: 4×10^{9} m^{3} 140×10^{9} cu ft

The Turnu oil field is an oil field located in Pecica, Arad County. It was discovered in 1964 and developed by Petrom. It began production in 1965 and produces oil. The total proven reserves of the Turnu oil field are around 51 million barrels (7 million tonnes), and production is centered on 2,000 barrels per day (320 m^{3}/d).
