= GSP Saturn =

History
- Name: GSP Saturn
- Owner: GSP Drilling
- Port of registry: Panama
- Builder: Galați shipyard
- Completed: 1988
- Status: Operational

General characteristics
- Class & type: Jackup Independent Leg Cantilever Drilling Unit
- Tonnage: 2,000 GT
- Length: 52.4 m (172 ft)
- Beam: 40.8 m (134 ft)
- Height: 120 m (390 ft)
- Draft: 9.75 m (32.0 ft)
- Depth: 6.4 m (21 ft)
- Installed power: 8430 hp
- Capacity: Variable Deck Load: 2,000 t; Liquid Mud: 1,880 bbls (299 m^{3})
- Crew: 100

GSP Saturn is a Sonat Orion class 4-legged jackup, cantilever drilling unit operated by GSP Drilling, a Grup Servicii Petroliere subsidiary. The drilling unit is registered in Panama.

== Description ==
GSP Saturn drilling unit was designed by Sonat Offshore and was built by Petrom at the Galați shipyard in 1988. The rig was completely reconstructed and refurbished in 2009 at a cost of US$50 million. The rig was owned and operated by Petrom from 1988 to 2005 when the company sold its six offshore platforms (including Atlas, Jupiter, Orizont, Prometeu and Saturn) to Grup Servicii Petroliere for US$100 million.

GSP Saturn has a length of 52.4 metres (172 ft), breadth of 40.8 metres (134 ft), draft of 6.4 metres (21 ft), height of 120 metres (390 ft) and depth of 9.75 metres (32.0 ft). She has a maximum drilling depth of 9,100 metres (29,900 ft) and she could operate at a water depth of 91 metres (300 ft). As a drilling rig, GSP Saturn is equipped with advanced drilling equipment and has to meet strict levels of certification under international law. GSP Saturn is able to maneuver with its own engines (to counter drift and ocean currents), but for long-distance relocation it must be moved by specialist tugboats. The rig is capable of withstanding severe sea conditions including 12 metres (39 ft) waves and 155 kilometres per hour (96 mph) winds.

== Operations ==
GSP Saturn has operated in the Black Sea, Mediterranean Sea, North Sea, and was most recently seen drilling in the Bulgarian sector of the Black Sea.
