= Port of Galați =

Coordinates: 45°26′27″N 28°04′35″E

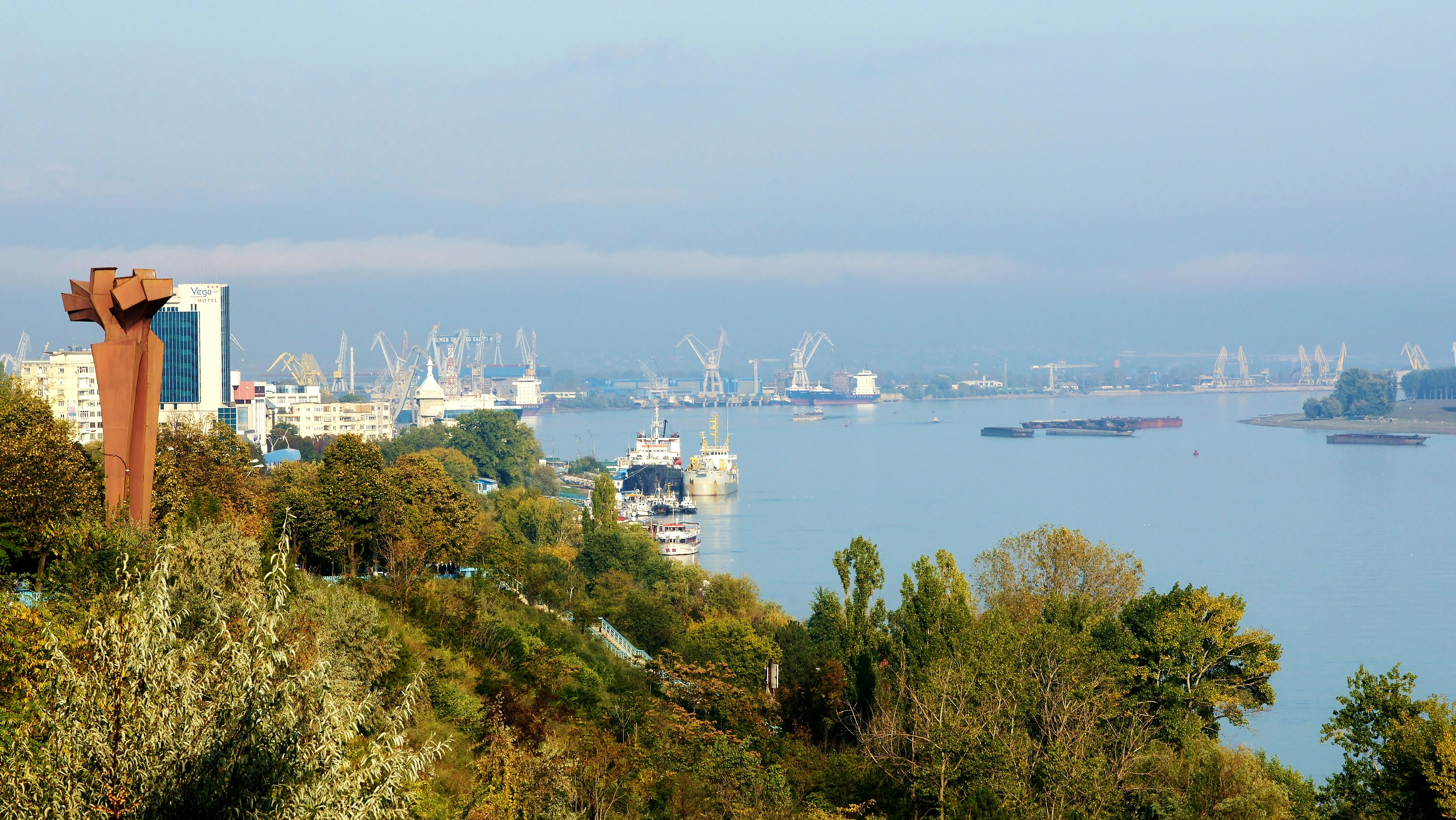
- Click on the map for a fullscreen view

Location
- Country: Romania
- Location: Galați County
- UN/LOCODE: ROGAL

Details
- Owned by: Compania Națională a Administrația Porturilor Dunării Maritime
- Type of harbour: Natural/Artificial
- Size: 860 acres (0.86 square kilometres)
- No. of berths: 56
- General manager: Mihai Ochialbescu

Statistics
- Vessel arrivals: 4,325 (2008)
- Annual cargo tonnage: 8,871,000 tonnes (2008)
- Website; Official site

The Port of Galați is the largest port and sea port on the Danube River and the second largest Romanian port. Located in the city of Galați, the port is an important source of revenue for the city because many large international companies have established there.

The shipbuilding industry is a key activity of the port and Dutch company Damen Group, which owns the Galați shipyard, is the most important enterprise established there.

The port is used by the Mittal Steel Company as its transport hub for exporting and importing cargo from and for Mittal Steel Galați, the largest Romanian steel producer.
