= Lebăda Vest oil field =

Oil field on the continental shelf of the Black Sea

Lebăda Vest
- Country: Romania
- Region: Black Sea
- Offshore/onshore: offshore
- Operator: Petrom

Field history
- Discovery: 1980
- Start of development: 1980
- Start of production: 1993

Production
- Current production of oil: 10,000 barrels per day (~5.0×10^{5} t/a)
- Current production of gas: 1,000×10^{3} m^{3}/d 35.8×10^{6} cu ft/d 0.36×10^{9} m^{3}/a (13×10^{9} cu ft/a)
- Estimated oil in place: 6.8 million tonnes (~ 8×10^{6} m^{3} or 50 million bbl)
- Estimated gas in place: 5.7×10^{9} m^{3} 200×10^{9} cu ft

The Lebăda Vest oil field is an oil field located on the continental shelf of the Black Sea. It was discovered in 1980 and developed by Petrom. It began production in 1993 and produces oil. The total proven reserves of the Lebăda Vest oil field are around 50 million barrels (6.8 million tonnes), and production is centered on 10,000 barrels per day (1,600 m^{3}/d). The field also produces around 35.8 million cubic feet/day (100,000 m^{3}/d) of gas and has reserves of 200 billion cubic feet (5.7 billion m^{3}).
