= Galata gas field =

Black Sea natural gas field

- Country: Bulgaria
- Region: Black Sea
- Block: Galata Production Concession
- Offshore/onshore: Offshore
- Coordinates: 43.04456°N 28.19323°E
- Operator: Petroceltic

Field history
- Discovery: 1993 (Texaco and JV partners)
- Start of development: 2003 (Melrose)
- Start of production: 2004 (Melrose)

The Galata gas field is a natural gas field located on the continental shelf of the Black Sea approximately 25km Southeast of Varna, Bulgaria. The field was the first to be developed offshore Bulgaria, and at peak production provided more than 16% of Bulgaria's domestic gas needs, the platform and associated infrastructure is still the only production facility located in the Bulgarian Black Sea.

== Discovery ==
Gas was discovered in the Late Cretaceous / Late Paleocene calcarenite reservoir in 1993 by Texaco and its JV partners (Texaco 20% - Operator, Enterprise 20%, OMV 10% and the remaining 50% was held by the State (Bulgarian Committee of Geology and Mineral Resources)).

The discovery well Galata 1 was drilled using the Ocean Liberator semi submersible drilling rig. The well flowed at 960 thousand cubic metres (34 million cubic feet) per day through a 32 millimetres (1.25 inches) choke. This was the first offshore commercial gas discovery in Bulgaria.

Later the same JV further appraised the field with the Galata 2 well and Bogdanov East 1 well. The field was later developed by the UK company Melrose Resources plc.

== Development ==
Melrose Resources plc acquired its initial interests in Bulgaria through the acquisition in 1998 of Petreco S.A.R.L. whose interests included the undeveloped Galata discovery.

The development of the field required considerable capital investment by Melrose Resources plc (supported by the IFC) to construct the necessary onshore and offshore infrastructure of which there was none in Bulgaria. The majority of the development project work was undertaken in 2003 and 2004. This included:

- The construction of the Galata production platform in Varna, Bulgaria. The platform was then transported to the field location by barge and installed at the location 25km offshore (a tripod platform with 3 pile driven legs and 3 open grated floors) holding the GP-1 and GP-2 wellheads;
- The drilling of 2 production wells (GP-1 and GP-2) into the gas reservoir using the Ukrainian jack up rig Tavrida cantilevered above the Galata production platform;
- A 20km offshore pipeline to transport the gas from the Galata platform to the beach landing south of Varna;
- An onshore processing plant (OPP) located South of Varna near the beach landing to receive the produced gas and remove both water and heavier hydrocarbons to bring the gas to sales quality. Later onshore compressors were added at the OPP to maximise the potential gas recovery from the reservoir;
- A 70km onshore pipeline crossing a number of roads and mainly agricultural land of varying gradient;
- A metering station near Provadia to measure the quantity and quality of the gas at the sales point into the National Transmission System (NTS) operated by Bulgartransgaz.

Production from the Galata gas field commenced in June 2004 once all the infrastructure was in place and fully commissioned.

== Production and Reserves ==
The total proven reserves of the Galata gas field prior to production was around 74 billion cubic feet (2.1 billion cubic metres). At peak production the field provided more than 16% of Bulgaria's domestic gas needs with production rates up to 60 million cubic feet (1.7 million cubic metres) per day.

In order to maximise gas recovery from the field onshore compression was required as the reservoir pressure declined through production. A first compressor was installed in January 2006 with a second one installed in the autumn of 2007, both were located at the onshore process plant (OPP). The Melrose Resources plc Annual Report 2007 stated "the compressor, which has been synchronized with the existing production facilities, will facilitate the recovery of the field’s booked proved plus probable reserves and take the ultimate recovery to an estimated 74 Bcf".

In January 2009 the field was shut-in with Melrose exploring the option of converting the field to gas storage making some "low cost modifications" and seeking approvals. In 2012, Petroceltic (Melrose was acquired in 2012 by Petroceltic) reported in its Annual Report that pressure surveys had indicated gas was "migrating from remote areas of the structure" and production was recommenced.

In March 2017 (following the acquisition of Petroceltic by Worldview Capital Management) a water knockout system was installed on the Galata platform to "allow for further production enhancements".

== Satellite Fields ==
Three additional satellite fields located to the East of the Galata gas field were discovered by Melrose between 2007 and 2010. These were the Kaliakra gas field discovered in 2007, the Kavarna gas field discovered in 2008 and the Kavarna East gas field discovered in 2010. The Kaliakra and Kavarna fields were developed and brought on production on 4 November 2010 utilising subsea wells and tie back gathering pipelines that connect to the Galata production platform and infrastructure. The utilisation of subsea well technology on these two field developments was a first in the Western Black Sea. The Kavarna East field has not yet been developed.

== Operator ==
The current operator of the field is Petroceltic who merged with Melrose Resources Plc in 2012. Petroceltic was acquired by Worldview Capital Management, a Cayman Island-based financial fund in June 2016.
