= Galați shipyard =

Shipyard in Romania

Coordinates: 45°26′37.7″N 28°05′23.3″E

Damen Shipyards Galați

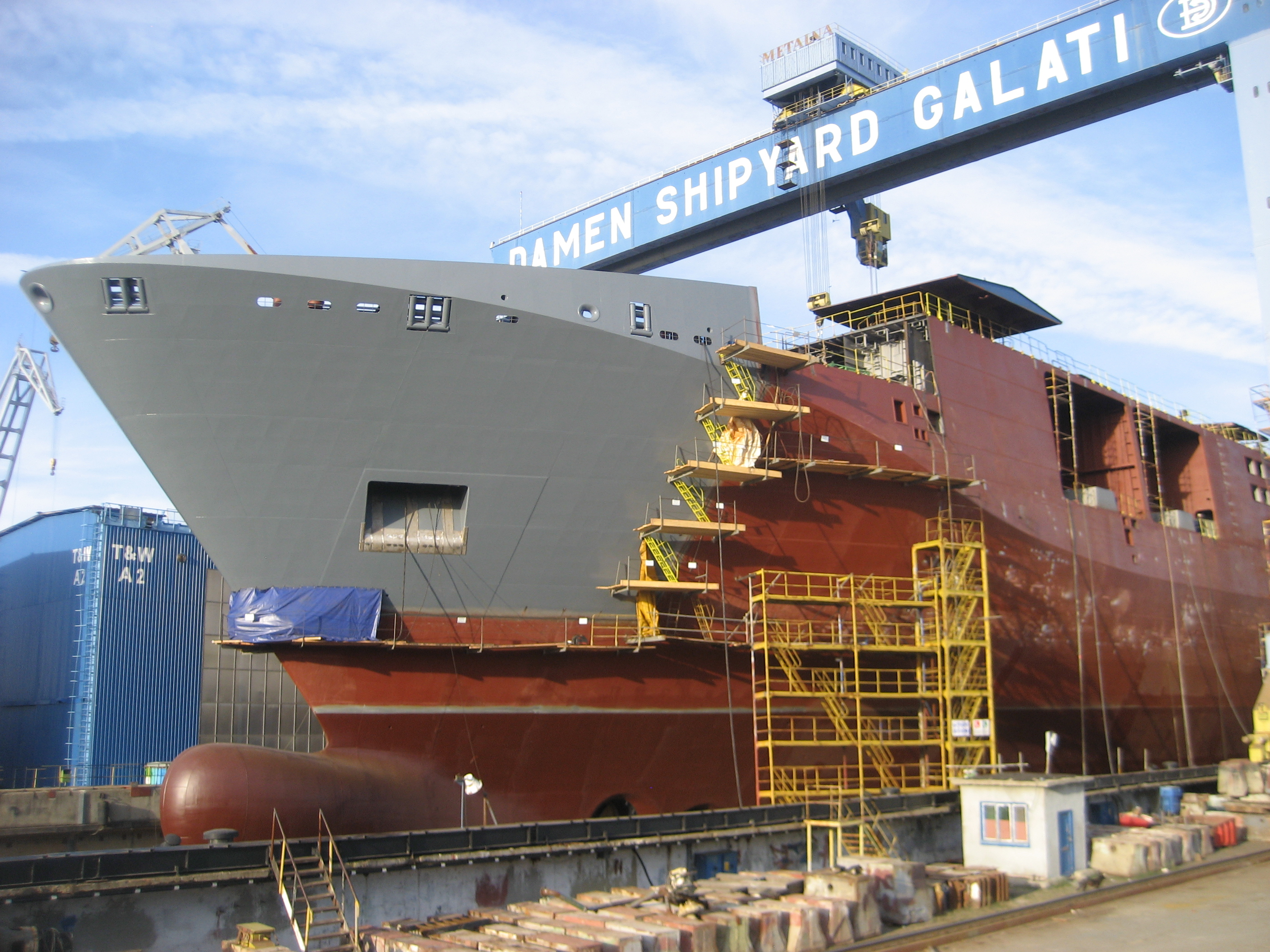
- Construction of the bow section of HNLMS Karel Doorman (A833)
- Founded: March 1893; 133 years ago
- Headquarters: Galați, Romania
- Area served: Worldwide
- Key people: Gheorghe Fernic
- Number of employees: 1,700
- Parent: Damen Group
- Website: www.damen.com/companies/damen-shipyards-galati

Shipyards of Romania

The Galați shipyard (Romanian: Șantierul Naval Galați (SNG)), formally Damen Shipyards Galați, is a shipyard located on the maritime sector of the Danube in Galați, a city located in the Moldavia region of Romania. It was founded in 1893 as the G. Fernic et Co Mechanical constructions and iron and bronze foundry (Uzinele de construcții mecanice și turnătorie de fier și bronz G. Fernic et Co). In 1897, it was renamed as the G. Fernic et Co Shipyard (Șantierul naval G. Fernic et Co).

== History ==
=== Origins to 1893 ===
The earliest mention of a shipyard in Galați comes from a firman issued to Alexandru Lăpușneanu in the late 16th century, regarding the arming of some caïques constructed there. In the following period, many shipyards were established around the port of Galați. During the first half of the 18th century, one shipyard developed extensively. It incorporated a launch slipway, a rigging shop, material stores, a sawmill, and a log warehouse. In 1761, the Ragusan traveler Roger Joseph Boscovich, described the shipyard as an "arsenal" where ships were being built for the Turks. Boscovich also described seeing a large ship with 84 cannons under construction. Due to Moldavia being a vassal state, most war vessel production was on behalf of the Ottoman Navy through the 1820s. By 1773, many ships including frigates, caravels, various commercial ships, as well as ships of the line with up to 60 cannons were constructed there. Austrian Captain Georg Lauterer reported in 1783 that annually the shipyard was building 10 to 12 ships with 2 to 3 masts and was repairing many more. Many of these ships were built for the Ottoman Empire, but the construction cost was covered by the Danubian Principalities. One such order came in 1794, when 10 warships were to be built at Galați and paid for by Wallachia and Moldavia.

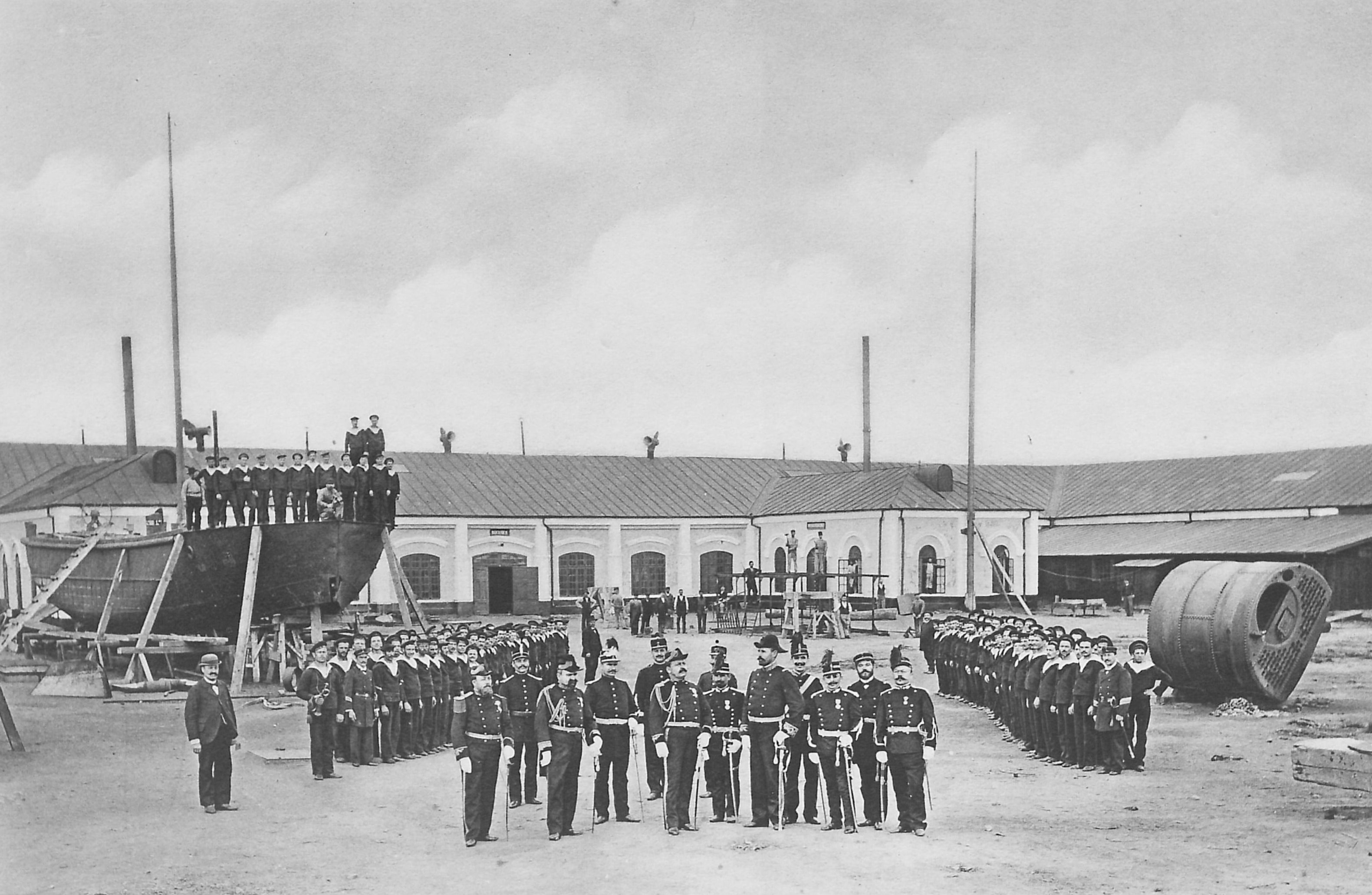
The Navy Arsenal of Galați

The wood, of high quality, came from forests upstream and was brought by raft. In 1817, a brig was built for Voivode Scarlat Callimachi. However, it was not until the late 1830s, following the establishment of a free port at Galați, that the bulk of its ships started being used domestically: seven vessels were built there in 1839, followed by ten in 1840. Due to the fewer and fewer orders for wooden ships, the shipyard ceased its activity by late 1860. Following the unification of Moldavia and Wallachia, the Headquarters and the Fleet Workshop of the Romanian Navy were moved to Galați. In 1879, the workshop became the Navy Arsenal.

=== 1893 to World War II ===
In March 1893, a local resident named Gheorghe Fernic established the "G. Fernic et Co Mechanical constructions and iron and bronze foundry" together with I. Guiller and T. Poujollat. In 1897, Fernic obtained approval to create a branch of his company that would work on ship repairs, which was named the "G. Fernic et Co Shipyard" (Șantierul naval G. Fernic et Co). In 1898, two state-owned floating dry docks started to be rented to the shipyard for repair works. In 1907, the shipyard was extended. Also in 1907, four river monitors (NMS Ion C. Brătianu, Mihail Kogălniceanu, Alexandru Lahovari and Lascăr Catargiu) were commissioned for the Romanian Navy. Built in sections in the Austro-Hungarian port of Trieste, they were assembled in Galați. In 1911, under the Premiership of Petre P. Carp, the area suffered some structural collapse, allegedly as a result of bad workmanship and political corruption (investigated by Nicolae Fleva on behalf of the Opposition). Through further association with Stabilimento Tecnico Triestino, several buildings were constructed at that time. In 1916, the shipyard changed its name to the "Danube Shipyards".

During the interwar period and into World War II, the yard had strategic significance, and two submarines (NMS Rechinul and NMS Marsuinul) and one minelaying destroyer escort (NMS Amiral Murgescu) were built there. Initially commanded by German captains, then replaced with Romanian crews, the submarines later fell to the Soviet Navy. From 1938 to 1944, Galați completed 65 civilian ships and 11 warships: in addition to the submarines and minelaying destroyer, these consisted of four motor torpedo boats (the Vedenia-class) and four minesweepers (the Democrația-class). The country's first native-built dry dock was constructed there between 1937 and 1942. Before the war, the largest ships built were a river steamer of 420 tons and barges up to 1,700 tons at Galati; the yard employed 500 to 800 men. The number of employees reached nearly 2,000 during the war. Romania's first native-built oil tanker, SRT-128, was launched there in 1942. Between 1893 and 1944, 116 ships were fully-built at the shipyard. Many others were assembled and repaired.

=== Postwar period ===
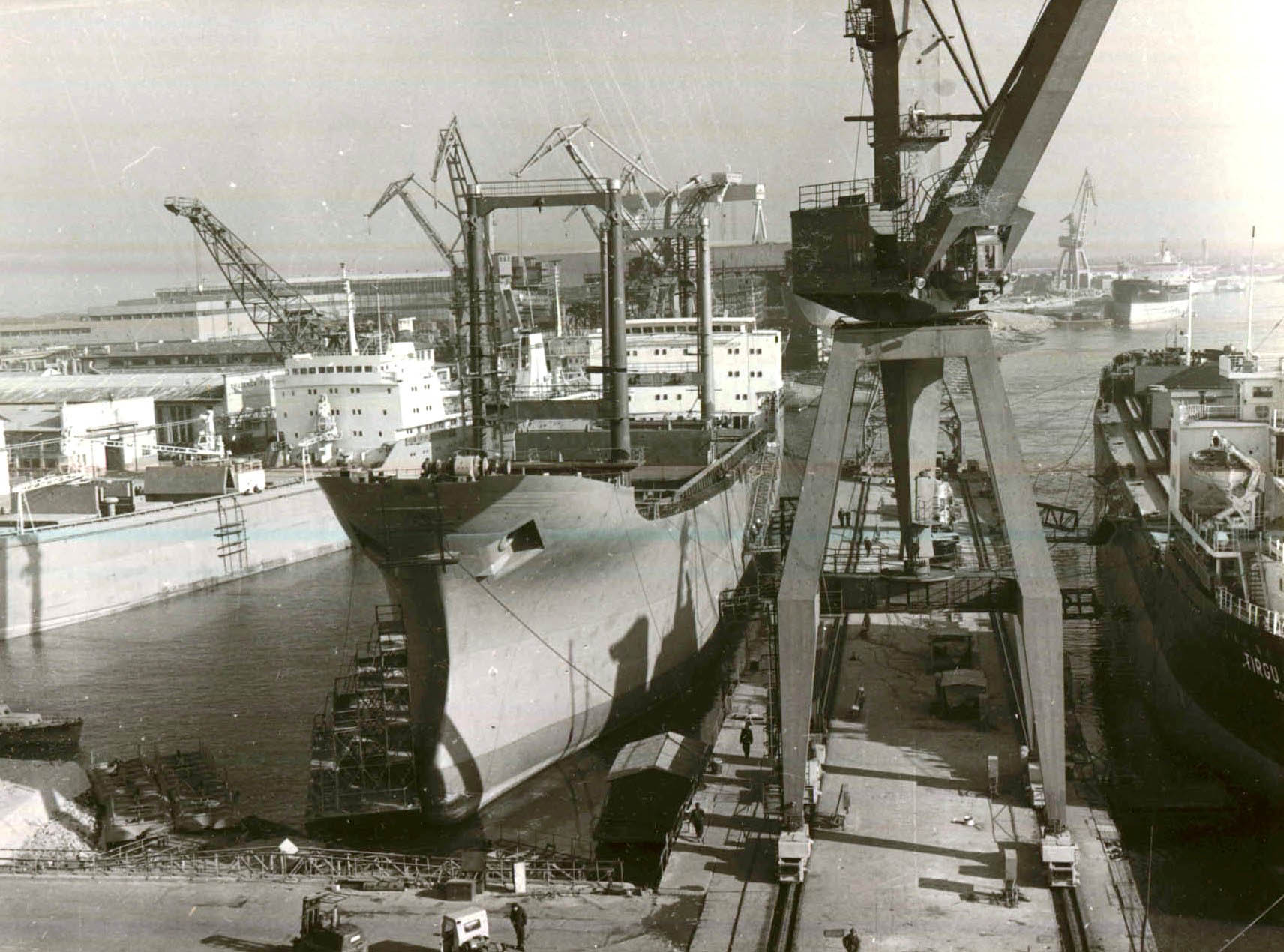
The shipyard in 1978

Between 1946 and 1950, the shipyard delivered 77 ships to its beneficiaries. The main types of ships built were oil tankers and grain and timber barges of 1,000 and 2,000 tons, river tugs of 160-700 hp, as well as fishing trawlers.

On 11 June 1948, the shipyard was nationalized. After 1950, Galați shipyard was modernized by the communist regime in several stages, creating conditions for the construction of large-tonnage ships. In 1960, Galați shipyard (SNG) completed the construction of the first Romanian cargo ship of 4,400 DWT. By the end of 1970, SNG had built 477 ships: tankers, barges, cargo ships, tugs and fishing vessels.

After 1974, highly complex and high-capacity ships, with increasingly larger displacements up to 55,000 DWT, were built for Romanian and foreign clients, as well as 7 offshore drilling platforms for the exploitation of existing oil and gas reserves on the Black Sea continental shelf (Gloria Oil Platform, Orizont, Prometeu, Fortuna, Atlas, Jupiter and Saturn). From that time until the 1989 fall of the regime, some 80% of the shipyard's products were exported. The components of the Cernavodă Bridge were also built at SNG.

During the same period, an important horizontal integration of the naval industry was also created in Galați, starting with the Faculty of Naval Architecture (1951) and the ICEPRONAV Naval Design Institute (1957), and continuing with the Galați Naval Mechanical Enterprise (1966) which produced naval equipment, and the Naval Propeller and Steel and Iron Castings Enterprise (1972).

== Damen Group era ==
Following the 1989 fall of the communist regime, there were 32 unsold ships at the shipyard, and these were only liquidated in full in 2000. Meanwhile, the Dutch Damen Group had taken over the yard. The group's interest in Galați began in 1994, when it subcontracted several cargo vessel hulls. This was the means by which its manager decided whether to invest somewhere. Noticing too that the boats left over from the Communist period were being reinforced, he decided to take control of the shipyard company's stock, which happened in 1999. Although he wished to obtain 100% of the shares, he only managed to acquire 99%, the remainder being in the hands of unidentified individuals who received privatization vouchers in the 1990s.

Galați is the largest naval shipyard on the Danube, its output ranging from large tankers to small coast guard patrol boats. The company also represents a significant element of the local economy. Since 1990, all of its products have gone to export. Following Damen's takeover, an investment plan focusing on improving efficiency and working conditions was introduced. For example, at the time of the takeover, spoons and coffee cups were listed in the inventory; afterwards, all items worth under $100 were considered disposable goods and no longer placed on the record books. The yard builds offshore vessels, naval vessels, special vessels (such as buoy laying vessels, patrol vessels and research vessels), tugs, workboats and mega yachts, and has also produced oil tankers, container carriers, cargo barges and drilling rig platforms—over 250 vessels (as of 2010) since 1999. There were some 1,550 employees at the end of 2010, as well as 1,150 subcontracted employees handling support functions including electricity, HVAC, carpentry, blasting and painting. This was down from 10,000 total employees in 2006, of whom 3,100 worked for Damen. Engineering services are mainly supplied by two firms in which Damen is the major shareholder, Marine Engineering Galați, established in 2004, and Marine Design Engineering Galați, established in 2023. Production takes place on four lines: for vessels up to 10,000 DWT, for vessels up to 26,000 DWT, for vessels up to 50,000 DWT, and for tugs and workboats. There is also a workshop for piping and galvanizing and a blasting and painting hall.

Since 1999, when it was taken over by Damen Group, Galați shipyard has delivered (as of 2024) over 450 ships to customers around the world, including 30 military ships built for 13 countries. From the 1960s to 2021, over 1,500 ships were built at the Galați shipyard.

== Notable warships built ==
=== 1893–1999 ===
Minelayer
Name	Customer	Launched	Fate	Note
Amiral Murgescu	Romanian Naval Forces	14 June 1939	Decommissioned on 27 May 1988.	Had multiple roles in her lifetime, from minelayer to repairship.

Submarines
Name	Customer	Launched	Fate	Note
Marsuinul	Romanian Naval Forces	4 May 1941	Scrapped after November 1950	After 1944 used by the Soviet Union.
Rechinul	Romanian Naval Forces	22 May 1941	Withdrawn from active service in 1961.	Got scrapped 6 years later, in 1967.

=== 1999–present ===
Joint support ship
Name	Class	Customer	Launched	Fate	Note
Karel Doorman	Karel Doorman-class JSS	Royal Netherlands Navy	17 October 2012	In active service	The hull of this ship was built in the Damen Shipyards Galați, while fitting out was done by Damen Schelde Naval Shipbuilding. Furthermore, it is shared with the German Navy.

Landing platform dock
Name	Class	Customer	Launched	Fate	Note
Johan de Witt	Rotterdam-class	Royal Netherlands Navy	13 May 2006	In active service	Improved design of HNLMS Rotterdam (L800). Hull built at the Damen Shipyards Galați, while fitting out was done at Damen Schelde Naval Shipbuilding.

Multi-Purpose Vessel
Name	Customer	Launched	Fate	Note
NRP D. João II	Portuguese Navy	7 April 2026	Awaiting sea trials	Ship will function as an aerial, land and underwater drone carrier.

Offshore patrol vessel
Name	Class	Customer	Launched	Fate	Note
Friesland	Holland-class	Royal Netherlands Navy	4 November 2010	in active service	Built at Damen Shipyards Galați and fitting out by Damen Schelde Naval Shipbuilding.
Groningen	Holland-class	Royal Netherlands Navy	21 April 2011	in active service	Built at Damen Shipyards Galați and fitting out by Damen Schelde Naval Shipbuilding.

Yarmook-class corvette
Name	Pennant	Customer	Launched	Notes
PNS Yarmook	F-271	Pakistan Navy	17 May 2019	Named after the Battle of the Yarmuk.
PNS Tabuk	F-272	Pakistan Navy	3 September 2019	Named after the Expedition to Tabuk.
PNS Hunain	F-273	Pakistan Navy	12 September 2023	Named after the Battle of Hunayn.
PNS Yamama	F-274	Pakistan Navy	19 February 2024	Named after the Battle of al-Yamama

== Gallery ==
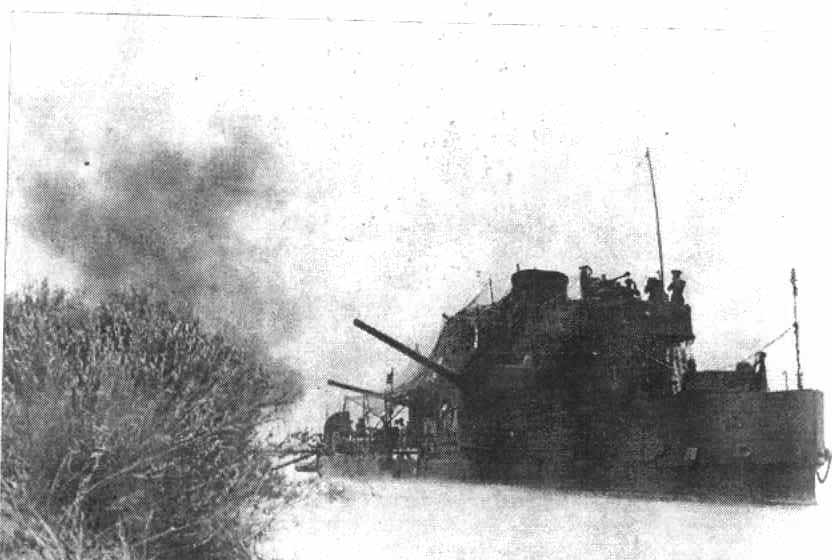
Mihail Kogălniceanu in 1941

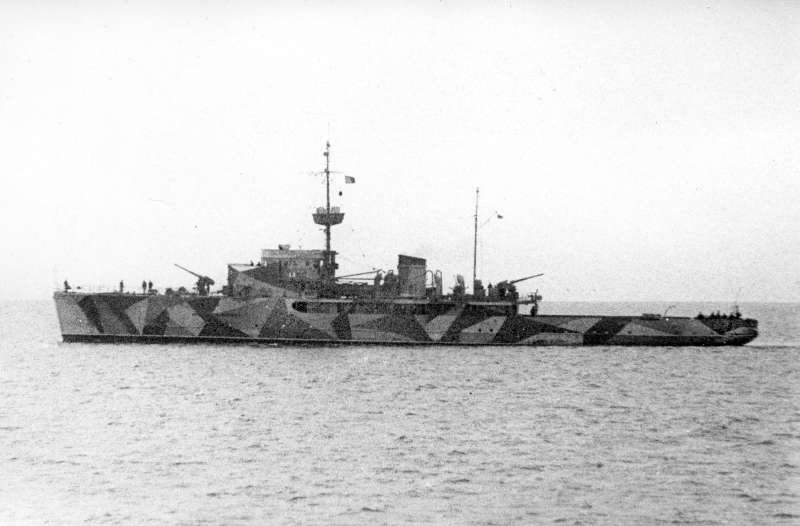
Amiral Murgescu, the largest Romanian-built warship of the Second World War

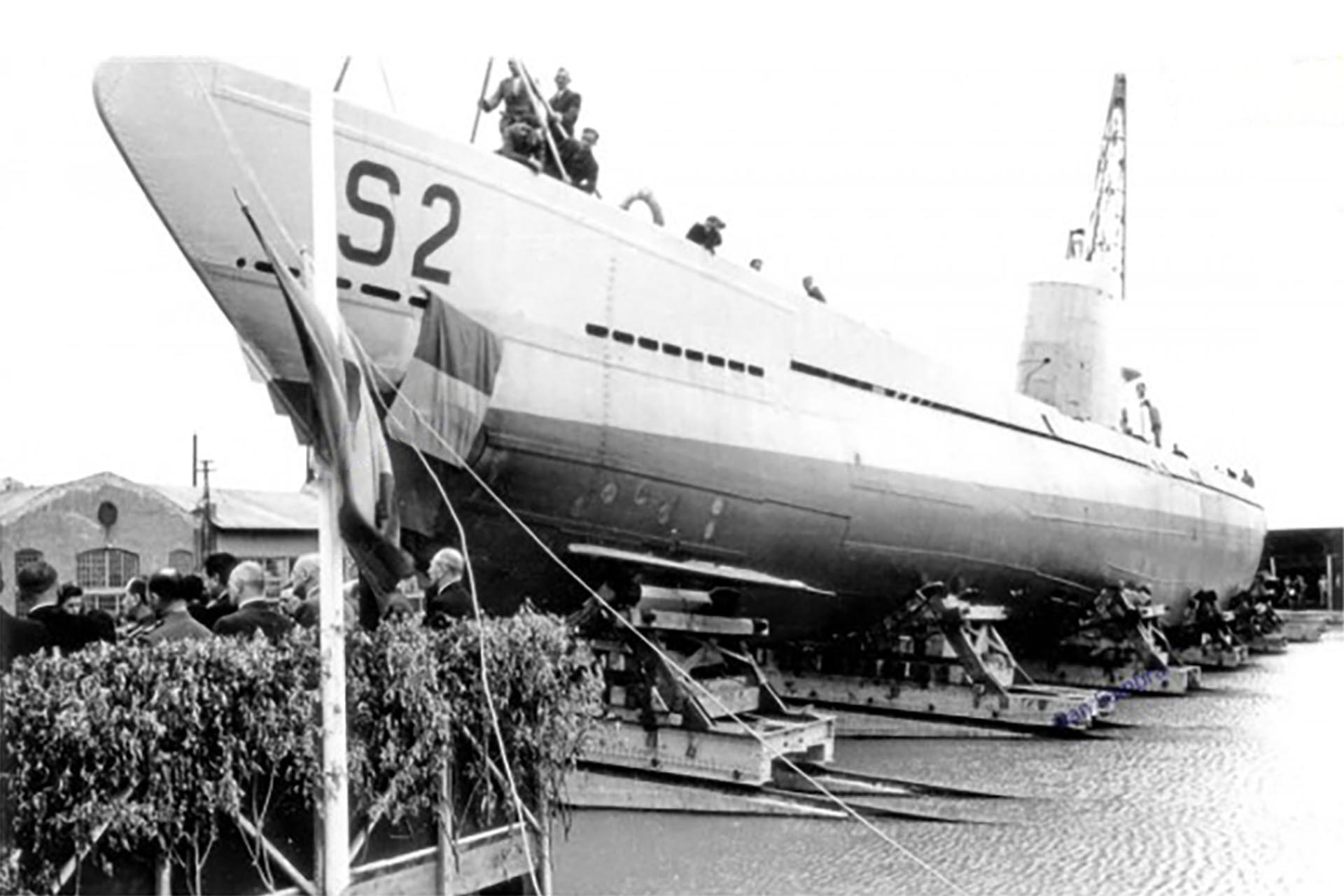
Launching of Marsuinul, May 1941

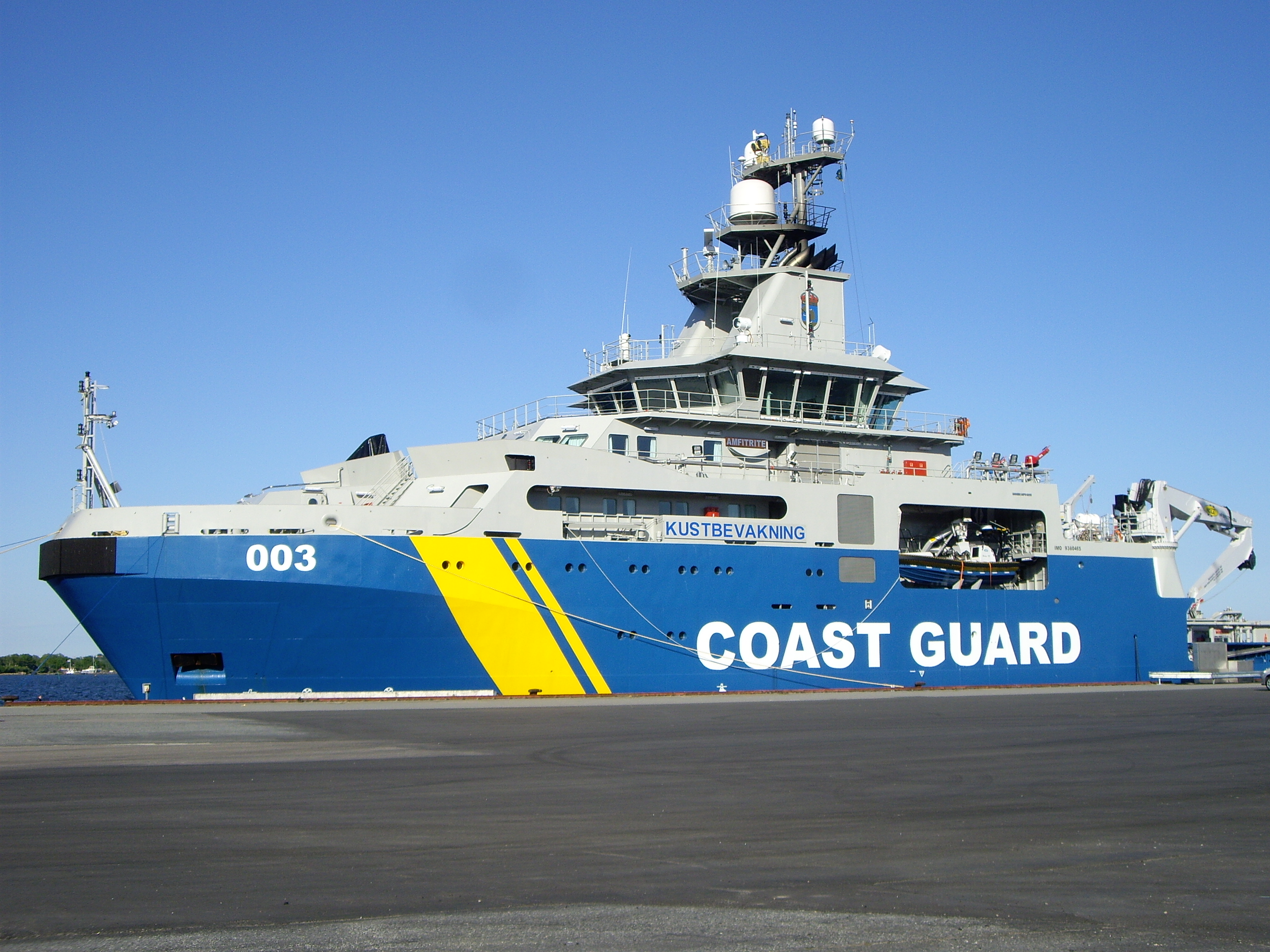
Amfitrite, a Swedish Coast Guard vessel built at Galați and launched in 2010

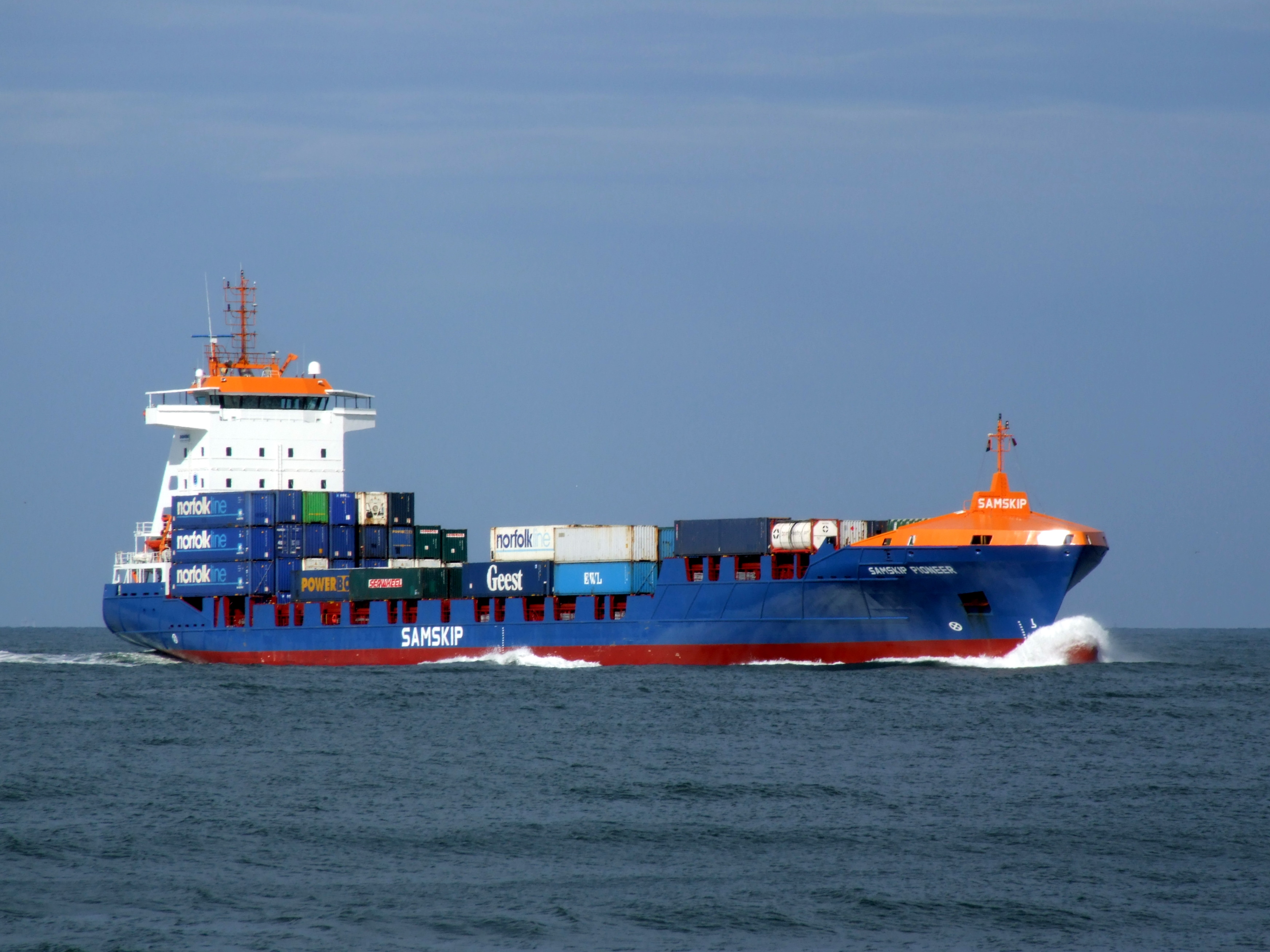
Samskip Pioneer, a container ship launched in 2006

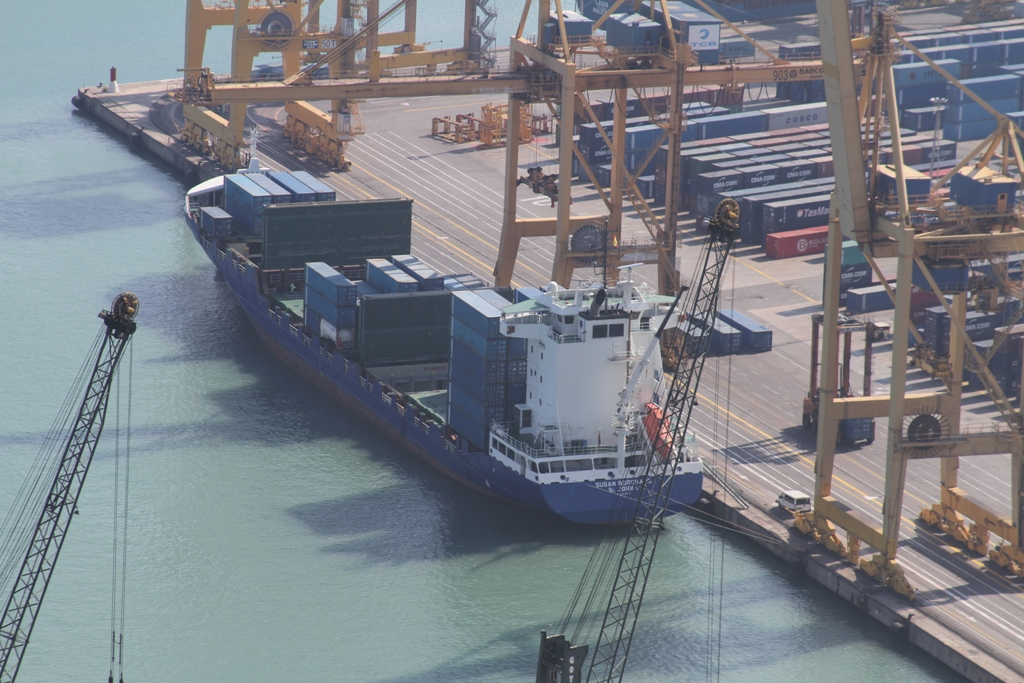
Susan Borchard, launched 2010

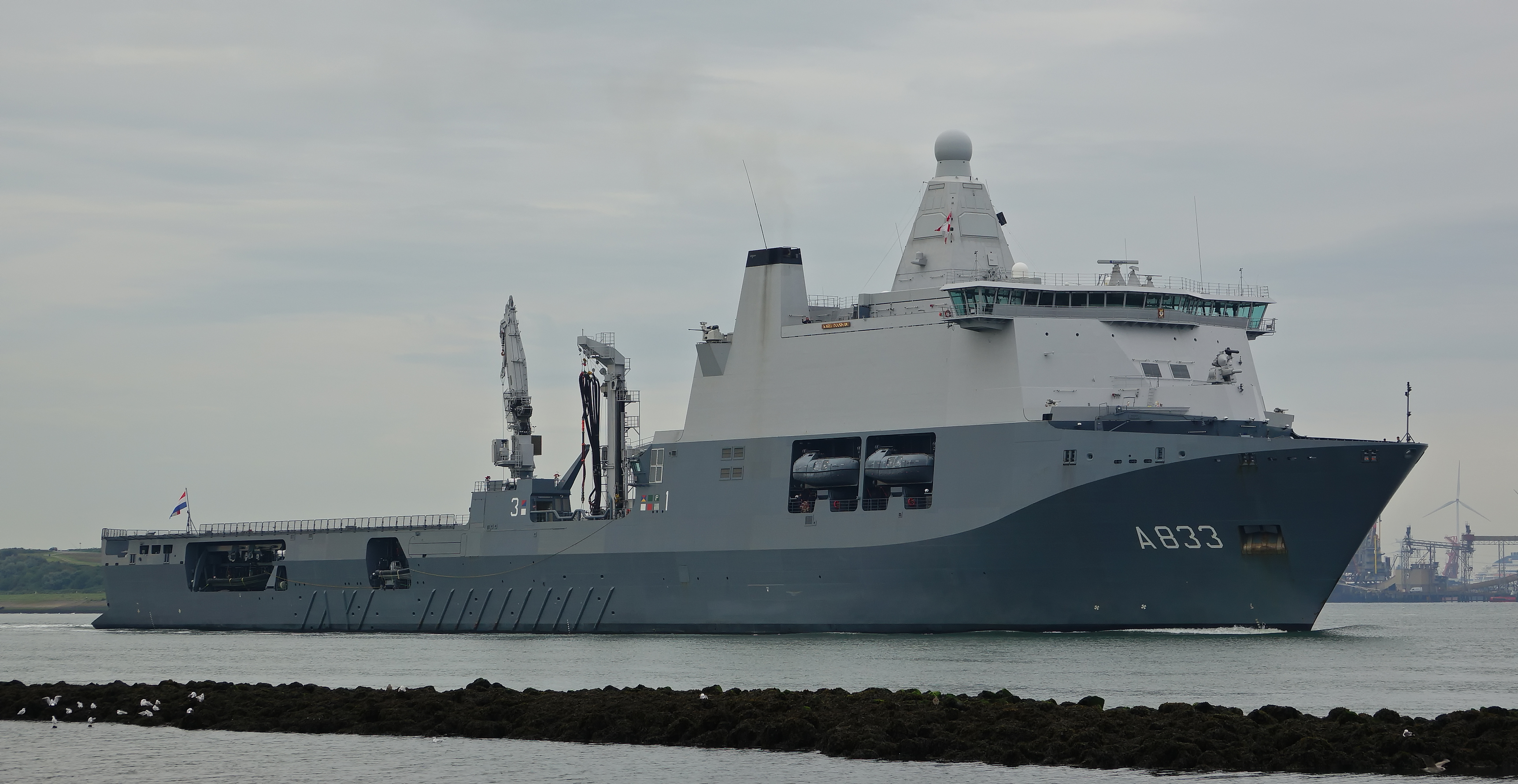
HNLMS Karel Doorman in 2017

== See also ==
- Port of Galați
- Damen Group
- Constanța Shipyard
- Mangalia shipyard
- List of Romanian-built warships of World War II
