= Nicolae Bălcescu, Constanța =

Nicolae Bălcescu
- Commune
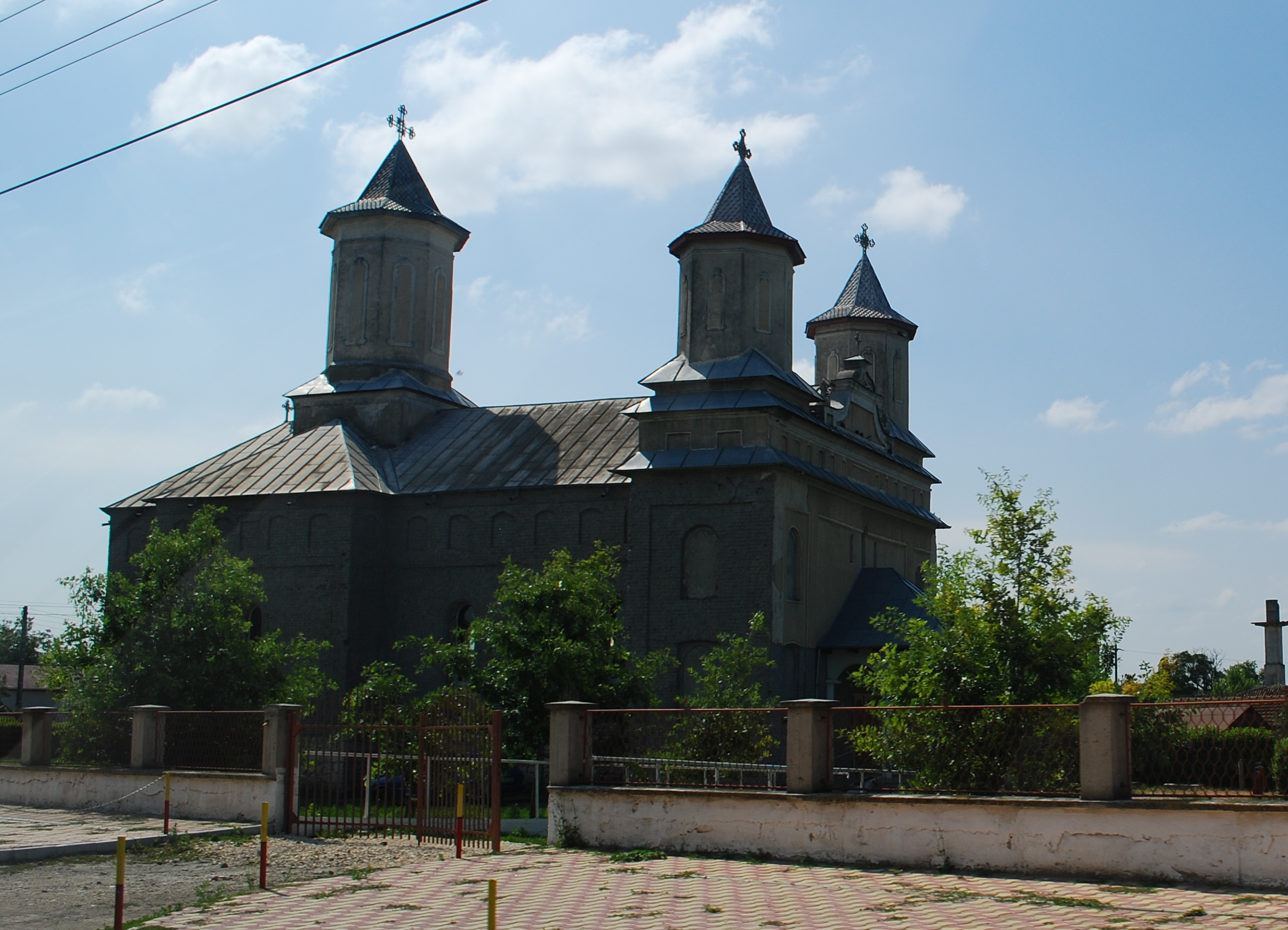

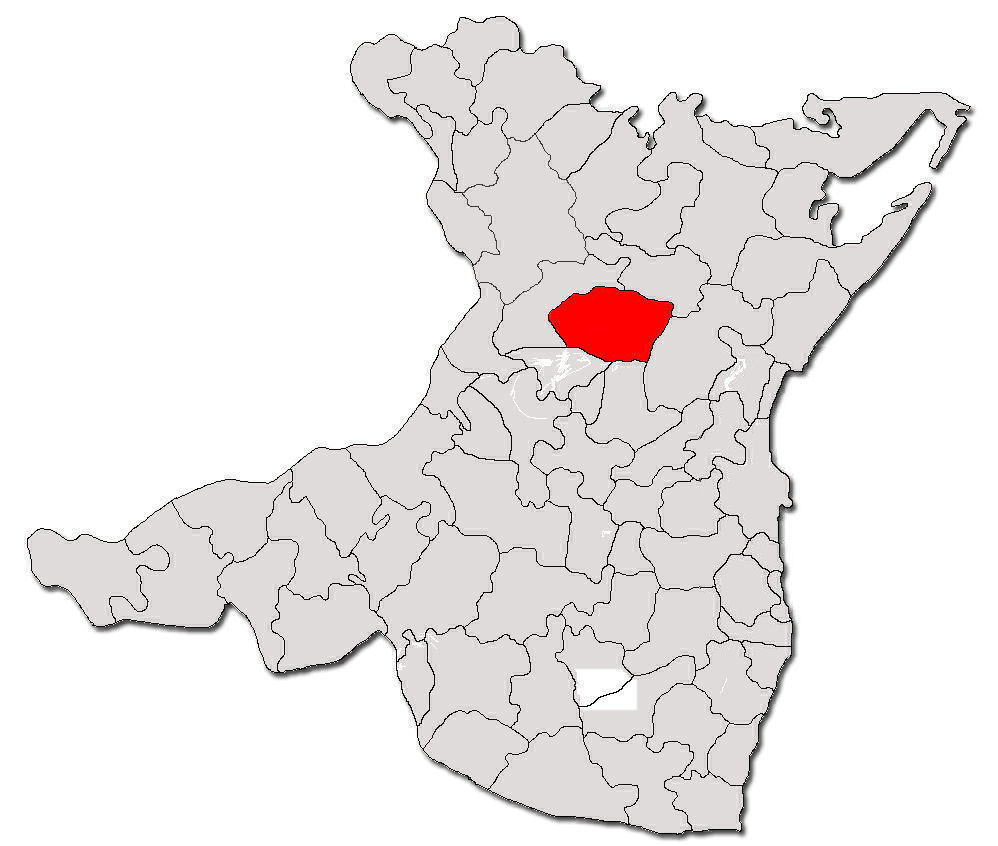
- Location in Constanța County

- Location in Romania
- Coordinates: 44°23′N 28°23′E
- Country: Romania
- County: Constanța
- Subdivisions: Nicolae Bălcescu, Dorobanțu

Government
  - Mayor (2020–2024): Dumitru Timofte (PSD)
- Area: 147.26 km^{2} (56.86 sq mi)
- Elevation: 90 m (300 ft)
- Population (2021-12-01): 4,779
  - Density: 32.45/km^{2} (84.05/sq mi)
- Time zone: UTC+02:00 (EET)
  - Summer (DST): UTC+03:00 (EEST)
- Postal code: 907210
- Area code: +40 x41
- Vehicle reg.: CT
- Website: www.primaria-nbalcescu.ro

Nicolae Bălcescu (Romanian pronunciation: [nikoˈla.e bəlˈt͡ʃesku]) is a commune in Constanța County, Northern Dobruja, Romania.

The commune includes two villages:

- Nicolae Bălcescu (historical names: Danachioi, Turkish: Danaköy; Carol I), named after the Romanian historian and revolutionary Nicolae Bălcescu
- Dorobanțu (historical name: Turkish: Bilar'ar)

The Dorobanțu Wind Farm is located on the territory of the commune.

== Demographics ==
Historical population
Year	Pop.	±%
2002	4,868	—
2011	4,757	−2.3%
2021	4,779	+0.5%
Source: Census data

At the 2011 census, Nicolae Bălcescu had 4,757 inhabitants; of those, 4,298 were Romanians (97.26%), 75 Roma (1.70%), 33 Tatars (0.75%), 5 Hungarians (0.11%), and 8 others (0.18%). At the 2021 census, the commune had a population of 4,779, of which 87.26% were Romanians.
