= Kaliakra gas field =

Black Sea natural gas field

- Country: Bulgaria
- Region: Black Sea
- Block: Kaliakra Production Concession
- Offshore/onshore: Offshore
- Operator: Petroceltic

Field history
- Discovery: 2007 (Melrose)
- Start of development: 2008 (Melrose)
- Start of production: November 2010 (Melrose)

The Kaliakra gas field is a natural gas field located on the continental shelf of the Black Sea located approximately 30km Southeast of Varna, Bulgaria. It was discovered by Melrose Resources plc in 2007 and brought on production in November 2010 through a subsea wellhead and tie-back pipeline to the Galata field platform infrastructure to the West.

== Discovery ==
The Kaliakra gas field was discovered in late 2007 by Melrose Resources plc, the discovery well was drilled using the Atwood Southern Cross semi-submersible drilling rig.

== Development ==
The majority of the operational development project work for the Kaliakra field development plan was undertaken during 2010 by Melrose Resources plc. The field came on production in November 2010.

== Production and Reserves ==
The total proven reserves of the Kaliakra gas field are around 960 million cubic metres (34 billion cubic feet) at standard conditions, and production is stated to be around 570 thousand m^{3} (20 million ft^{3}) per day at standard conditions in 2015.

== Operator ==
The current operator of the field is Petroceltic who merged with Melrose Resources Plc in 2012. Petroceltic was acquired by Worldview Capital Management, a Cayman Island-based financial fund in June 2016.
