= Lebăda Est oil field =

Black Sea oil field

Lebăda Est
- Country: Romania
- Region: Black Sea
- Offshore/onshore: offshore
- Operator: Petrom

Field history
- Discovery: 1987
- Start of development: 1987
- Start of production: 1989

Production
- Current production of oil: 15,000 barrels per day (~7.5×10^{5} t/a)
- Current production of gas: 1.5×10^{6} m^{3}/d 53.5×10^{6} cu ft/d 0.53×10^{9} m^{3}/a (19×10^{9} cu ft/a)
- Estimated oil in place: 6.8 million tonnes (~ 8×10^{6} m^{3} or 50 million bbl)
- Estimated gas in place: 6.9×10^{9} m^{3} 242×10^{9} cu ft

The Lebăda Est oil field is an oil field located on the continental shelf of the Black Sea. It was discovered in 1987 and developed by Petrom. It began production in 1989 and produces oil. The total proven reserves of the Lebăda Est oil field are around 50 million barrels (6.8 million tonnes), and production is centered on 15,000 barrels per day (2,400 m^{3}/d). The field also produces around 53.5 million cubic feet/day (150,000 m^{3}/d) of gas and has reserves of 242 billion cubic feet (6.9 billion m^{3}).
