= Yarmook-class corvette =

Class of corvettes of the Pakistan Navy

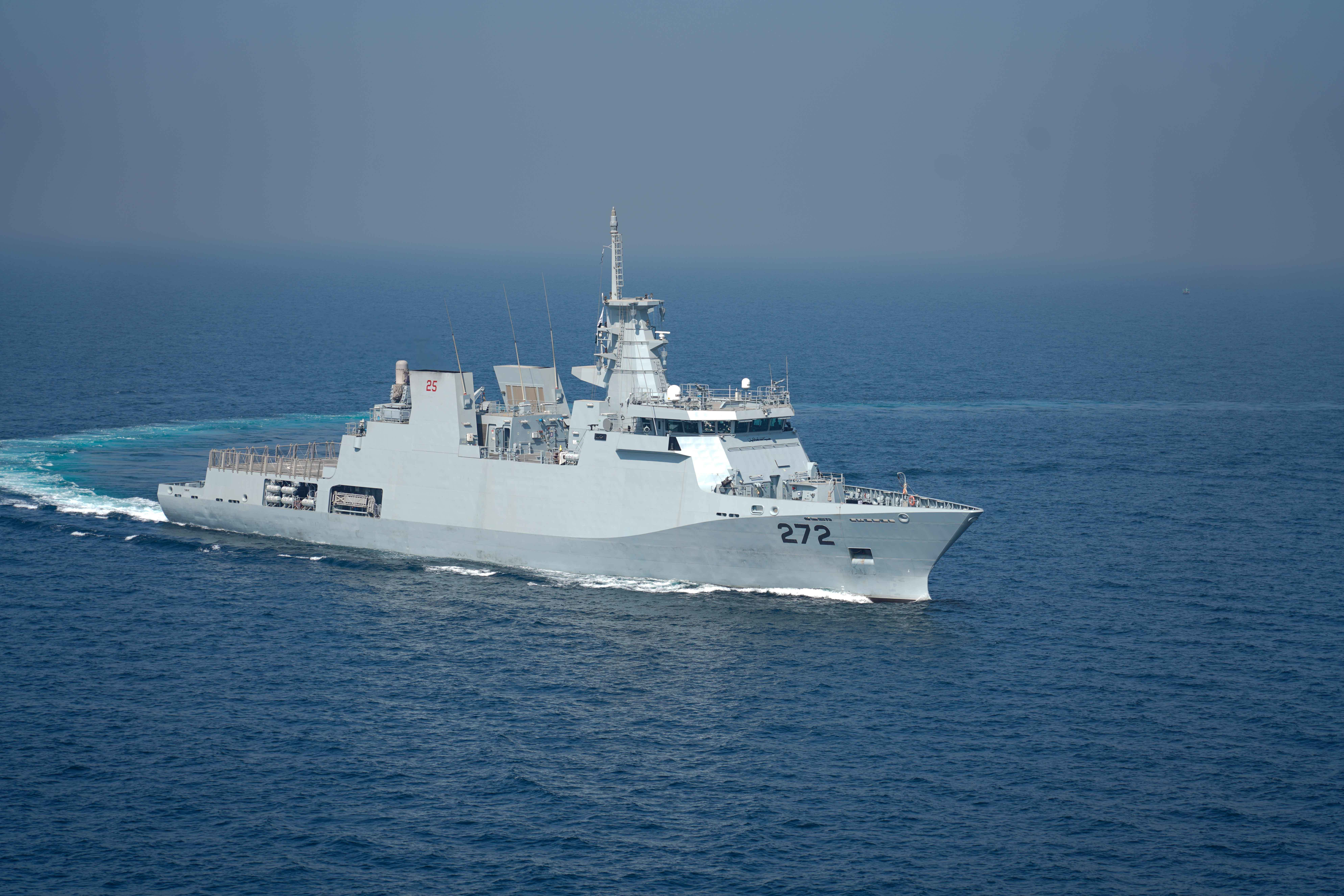
- PNS Tabuk in the Gulf of Oman

Class overview
- Name: Yarmook class
- Builders: Damen Shipyards, Galati, Romania (Galați shipyard)
- Operators: Pakistan Navy
- In service: 2020–present
- In commission: 13 February 2020 – present
- Planned: 4
- Completed: 4
- Active: 4

General characteristics (Batch 1-2)
- Type: Corvette
- Displacement: (B-1) 2,300 tons (B-2) 2,600 tons
- Length: (B-1) 91.3 m (299 ft 6 in) (B-2) 95.8 m (314 ft 4 in)
- Draught: 4 m (13 ft 1 in)
- Installed power: CODAD, 4 × Caterpillar 3516 diesel engines
- Speed: 22 knots (41 km/h; 25 mph)
- Range: 6,000 nmi (11,000 km; 6,900 mi) at 12 knots (22 km/h; 14 mph)
- Endurance: 40 days
- Boats & landing craft carried: 2 × RHIB boats
- Complement: (B-1) 60+ (B-2) 100+
- Sensors & processing systems: MR-36A I-band Surface/ Air Search and Track Radar
- Electronic warfare & decoys: Decoy flare, chaff launchers
- Armament: 1 × 30 mm Aselsan SMASH remote weapon station; 2 × 12.7 mm Aselsan STAMP remote weapon stations; 2 × 4-cell Harbah SSM launchers; 1 × 20 mm Phalanx Block 1B CIWS
- Aircraft carried: 1 × helicopter and 1 × UAV
- Aviation facilities: Flight deck

The Yarmook-class corvette is a class of corvettes in service with the Pakistan Navy. The class is primarily based on Damen Group's Offshore Patrol Vessel (OPV) 1900..

== Background and construction ==
Damen signed an agreement with Ministry of Defence Production, Pakistan on 30 June 2017 to design and build two multipurpose corvettes for Pakistan Navy. The Dutch shipbuilder selected its shipyard in Galați, Romania, to build these vessels. According to Pakistan Navy officials, the corvettes will "act as force multipliers in enhancing [the] navy's capability of safeguarding maritime frontiers and will offer more flexibility in the conduct of [the] Pakistan Navy's initiative of independent Regional Maritime Security Patrols in the Indian Ocean Region". On 13 July 2020, PNS Yarmook was inducted into the Pakistan Navy.

The keel of the first vessel of the second batch of two offshore patrol vessels (OPV) for the Pakistani Navy was laid in 2022. The OPVs of the second batch are larger than the first batch and based on the Damen OPV 2600 design.

On 12 September 2023 PNS Hunain was launched at Damen Shipyards Galați in Romania. The last corvette of the second batch (PNS Yamama) was launched on 19 February 2024 at Damen Shipyards Galați in Romania.

== Design and characteristics ==
The displacement of both the vessels is 2,300 tonnes. They are designed to carry out a variety of maritime operations and are able to transport both a helicopter and a unmanned aerial vehicle. They can also carry two high-speed rigid-hulled inflatable boats of 11.5 meters (38 ft) and 6.5 meters (21 ft) simultaneously. In addition to that, they are designed to accommodate two twenty-foot equivalent units for special mission-based operations.

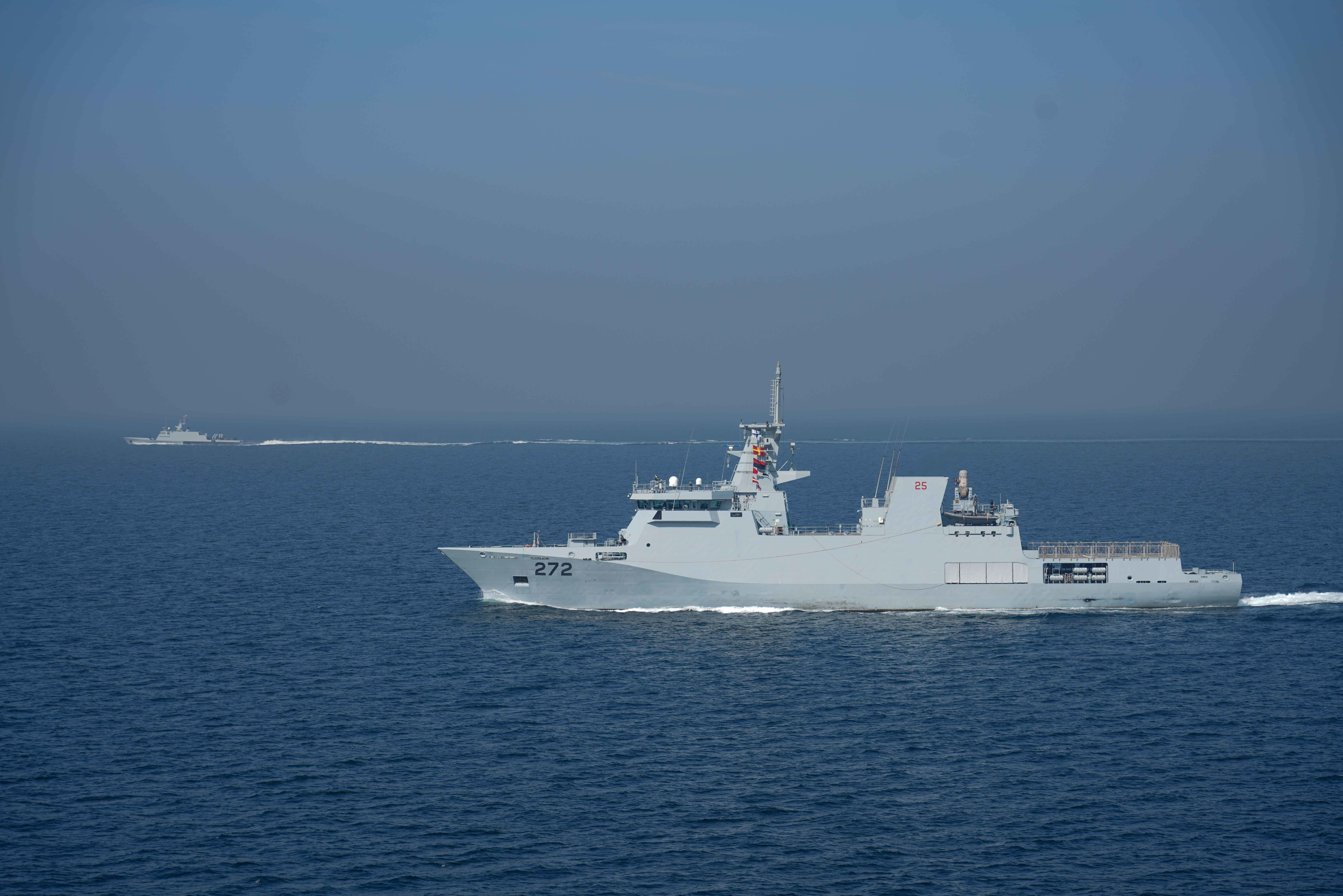
PNS Tabuk (right) during a passing exercise in the Gulf of Oman on 11 November 2021

The vessels of the second batch have a length of 98 meters (322 ft), a beam of 14.4 meters (47 ft) and a draft of 4 meters (13 ft). The displacement of both vessels is approximately 2600 tonnes. Besides being larger than the corvettes of the first batch, the second batch corvettes are also more heavily armed.

== Ships in class ==
Yarmook-class corvettes
Name	Pennant	Shipyard	Launched	Commissioning	Namesake
Batch-I
PNS Yarmook	F-271	Damen Shipyards Galati	17 May 2019	13 February 2020	Battle of the Yarmuk
PNS Tabuk	F-272	Damen Shipyards Galati	3 September 2019	12 November 2020	Battle of Tabuk
Batch-II
PNS Hunain	F-273	Damen Shipyards Galati	12 September 2023	26 July 2024	Battle of Hunayn
PNS Yamama	F-274	Damen Shipyards Galati	19 February 2024	17 December 2024	Battle of al-Yamama

== Service history ==
On 20 July 2024, PNS Yarmook set sail on a maritime patrol mission to safeguard Pakistani ports and vessels amidst the Red Sea crisis.

In April 2026, PNS Hunain rescued 18 crew members from MV Gold Autumn, a merchant vessel registered under the Panamanian flag, which had sent out a distress signal 200 nautical miles off the coastline of Pakistan in the northern Arabian Sea.
