= Dorobanțu Wind Farm =

Wind farm in Constanța County, Romania

Dorobanţu Wind Farm
- Country: Romania
- Location: Dorobanțu, Constanța County
- Status: Operational
- Construction began: 2010
- Commission date: 2011
- Construction cost: €90 million
- Owner: Petrom

Wind farm
- Type: Onshore

Power generation
- Units operational: 15 X 3 MW
- Make and model: Vestas-V90
- Nameplate capacity: 45 MW
- Annual net output: 120 GWh

The Dorobanțu Wind Farm is wind farm located in Constanța County, Romania. It has 15 Vestas-V90 wind turbines with a nominal output of around 3 MW each. It delivers up to 45 MW of power, enough to power over 30,000 homes, which required a capital investment of approximately €90 million.
