= Hunayn (name) =

Hunayn (Arabic: حُنَين) is an Arabic name.

People named so include:

- Hunayn ibn Ishaq (809-73), scholar, physician, and scientist
- Ishaq ibn Hunayn (c. 830 – c. 910/11), physician and translator, son of Hunayn ibn Ishaq
