= Kaliakra East gas field =

Natural gas field in the Black Sea, offshore Bulgaria

Kaliakra East
- Country: Bulgaria
- Region: Black Sea
- Block: Galata
- Offshore/onshore: offshore
- Operator: PetroCeltic

Field history
- Discovery: 1993
- Start of development: 1993
- Start of production: 1998

Production
- Current production of gas: 560×10^{3} m^{3}/d 20×10^{6} cu ft/d 0.2×10^{9} m^{3}/a (7.1×10^{9} cu ft/a)
- Estimated gas in place: 1.7×10^{9} m^{3} 59×10^{9} cu ft

The Kaliakra East gas field is a natural gas field located on the continental shelf of the Black Sea, offshore of Bulgaria in the Galata block. Discovered in 1993, it was developed by PetroCeltic, beginning production of natural gas and condensates in 1998. As of 2024–2025, local production from the Galata block, including Kaliakra East, contributes only a small fraction of Bulgaria’s total natural gas consumption, with volumes significantly lower than earlier estimates.
