= PNS Hunain (2023) =

Pakistani corvette

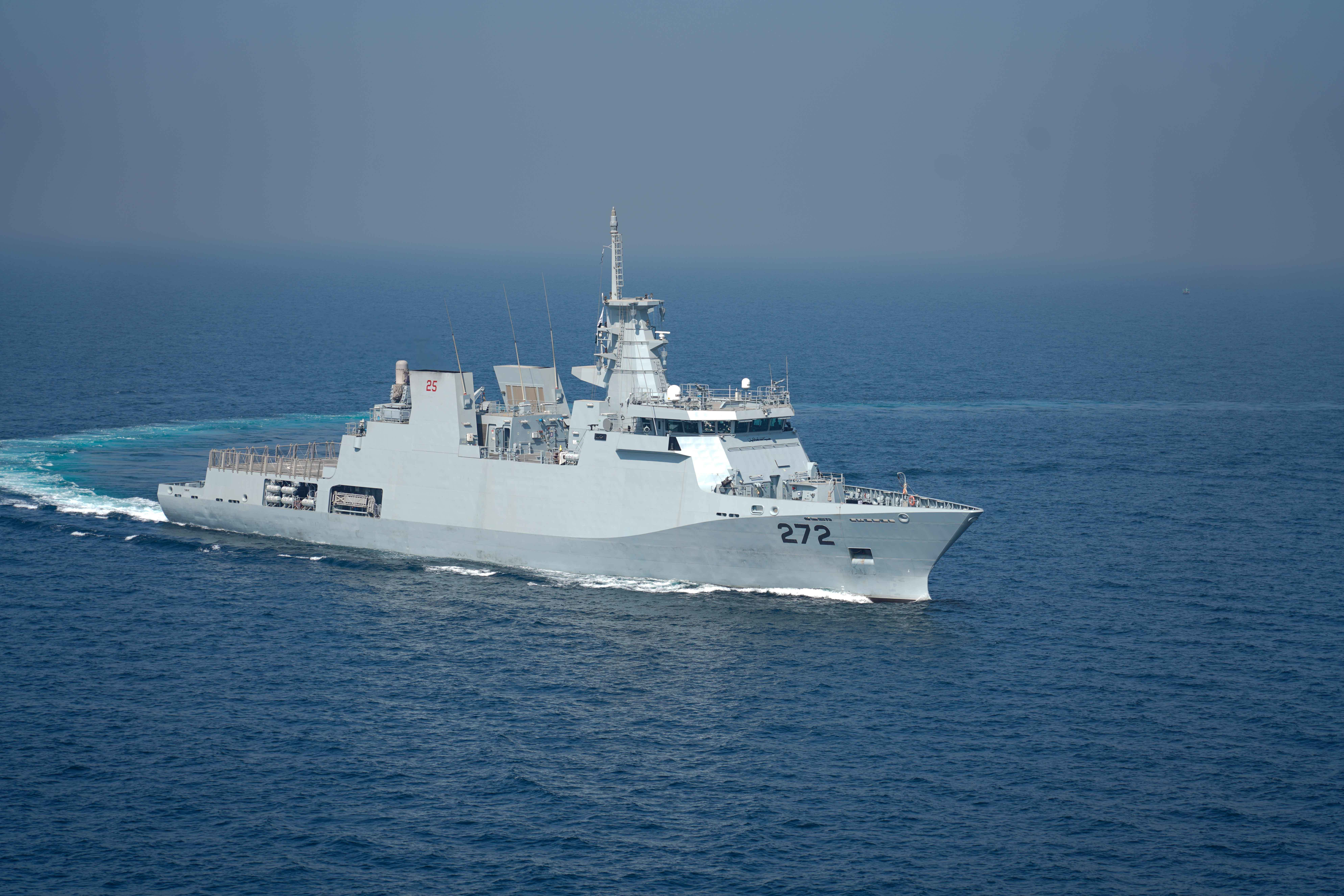
- Sister ship PNS Tabuk

History

Pakistan
- Name: PNS Hunain
- Namesake: Battle of Hunayn
- Operator: Pakistan Navy
- Builder: Galați shipyard
- Launched: 12 September 2023
- Acquired: 26 July 2024
- Commissioned: 26 July 2024
- Status: In active service

General characteristics
- Class & type: Yarmook-class corvette
- Displacement: 2,600 tons
- Length: (B-1) 95.8 m (314 ft 4 in)
- Draught: 4 m (13 ft 1 in)
- Installed power: CODAD, 4 × Caterpillar 3516 diesel engines
- Speed: 22 knots (41 km/h; 25 mph)
- Range: 6,000 nmi (11,000 km; 6,900 mi) at 12 knots (22 km/h; 14 mph)
- Endurance: 40 days
- Boats & landing craft carried: 2 × RHIB boats
- Complement: 100 sailors
- Sensors & processing systems: MR-36A I-band Surface/ Air Search and Track Radar
- Electronic warfare & decoys: Decoy flare, chaff launchers
- Armament: 1 × 30 mm Aselsan SMASH remote weapon station; 2 × 12.7 mm Aselsan STAMP remote weapon stations; 2 × 4-cell Harbah SSM launchers; 1 × 20 mm Phalanx Block 1B CIWS
- Aircraft carried: 1 × helicopter and 1 × UAV
- Aviation facilities: Flight deck

PNS Hunain (F273) is the third ship of the Yarmook-class corvettes operated by the Pakistan Navy.

== History ==
On 30 June 2017, the Damen Group signed an agreement with Ministry of Defence Production, Pakistan to design and build multipurpose corvettes for Pakistan Navy. The Dutch shipbuilder selected its shipyard in Galați, Romania, to build these vessels. The order was executed in two phases, as the ships of the second phase are larger than the first batch and based on the Damen OPV 2600 design. The keel of the first vessel of the second phase was laid in 2022.

On 12 September 2023, PNS Hunain was launched at Damen Shipyards Galați in Romania. She was commissioned into service on 26 July 2024, in a ceremony held in Romania.

In April 2026, Hunain rescued 18 crew members from MV Gold Autumn, a merchant vessel registered under the Panamanian flag, which had sent out a distress signal 200 nautical miles (370 km; 230 mi) off the coastline of Pakistan in the northern Arabian Sea. All sailors were evacuated to Karachi following a successful firefighting mission. The ship also helped to rescue all 20 Pakistani crew members from a sinking cargo dhow operating east of Ormara on 10 July.

=== 15th September 2026 collision incident ===
On 15 September 2026, PNS Hunain collided with a frontline warship of the Indian Navy in international waters of the northern Arabian Sea. Indian sources claimed the collision occurred as Hunain moved close to the Indian naval vessel at high speeds. The collision was reportedly a localized side graze contact.The Indian warship was reportedly on a routine surveillance mission in the region. Pakistan, on the other hand, claimed it was the Indian ship that carried out "aggressive manoeuvres in dangerously close proximity" to Hunian which was taking part in a biennial military exercise, Sea Spark 26, within the Pakistani exclusive economic zone (EEZ). The Indian warship was reportedly attempting to enter the exercise area of Sea Spark 26 since 7 September as per Pakistani sources. The condition of the Pakistani vessel following the collision was clarified in their statements. However, Indian media reports repeatedly claimed that the Pakistani ship suffered damage in the incident and had to return to harbour. This claim remains unsupported by both Pakistani and neutral sources. The Indian frontline warship was later reported as INS Kolkata (D63) by media reports, though the Indian government has neither confirmed nor declined the identification.

A similar naval collision last occurred in June 2011 when PNS Babur (D-182) advertently brushed off against INS Godavari (F20) in the Gulf of Aden. This also marked the first military tension between the two nations since the 2025 India–Pakistan conflict.

==== Reactions ====
The foreign ministries of both India and Pakistan had summoned the top diplomats of each other after the incident the following day. India lodged strong objection with Pakistan's chargé d'affaires in New Delhi terming the manoeuvres by the Pakistani naval units that led to the collision as "unacceptable and unprofessional conduct". While the incident did not result in any major damage, the Indian ministry stated the Pakistani act was a direct violation of the 1991 bilateral agreement which governs military exercises, manoeuvres, and troop movements. The Article 10 of the agreement mandates a minimum of 3 nautical miles (5.6 kilometres) to be maintained between naval vessels of the two nations.

Meanwhile, Pakistan registered their own complains with Indian chargé d'affaires in Islamabad calling the Indian naval vessel's action as "highly provocative and unacceptable". Pakistan also accused India of breaching the 1991 agreement while urging India to "refrain from irresponsible actions that could further destabilise South Asia".

=== 26th September 2026 narcotics seizure ===
On 26 September 2026, according to ISPR, PNS Hunain along with PNS Yarmook seized 2800 kilograms of narcotics with an estimated worth of 750 million USD in the Arabian sea. This was carried out as part of broader Combined Task force 150 operations.
