= Grup Servicii Petroliere =

Romanian oil and gas service company

Grup Servicii Petroliere (GSP Offshore; GSP)
- Type: Privately held
- Industry: Oil & Gas
- Founded: 2004
- Headquarters: Constanţa
- Revenue: USD 548 million (2010)
- Number of employees: 700 (2008)
- Parent: Upetrom Group
- Website: gspoffshore.com

Grup Servicii Petroliere (GSP Offshore) is a Romanian company providing offshore integrated services for oil and gas industry. The company, established in 2004, is a member of UPETROM Group.

Grup Servicii Petroliere (GSP Offshore) performs offshore integrated services for the oil and gas industry. GSP is a member of Upetrom Group, a private company. GSP operates seven offshore drilling rigs: GSP Saturn, GSP Jupiter, GSP Orizont, GSP Atlas, GSP Prometeu, GSP Fortuna and GSP Britannia. GSP also operates several multifunctional vessels, one Medevac vessel and two floating cranes. GSP has engaged the rigs in a modernization process. The GSP QHSE Management System has been audited and certified as complying with ISO 9001, ISO 14001, OHSAS 18001 and ISM Code requirements by Germanischer Lloyd. In 2006, GSP integrated its SAP application. GSP is a member of the International Association of Drilling Contractors|International Association of Drilling Contractors, IADC. The companies within UPETROM GROUP have activities in onshore and offshore drilling, oilfield equipment production, as well as in the tourism sector. UPETROM GROUP has 3000 employees and is operating worldwide with representative offices in many countries.

== Lines of business ==
GSP provides various services for the oil & gas industry: drilling, offshore construction, shipping, well services, hydro-technical construction, engineering, subsea services and training.

=== Drilling ===
The company performs drilling activities throughout seven drilling rigs: GSP Atlas, GSP Prometeu, GSP Saturn, GSP Orizont, GSP Jupiter, GSP Fortuna and GSP Britannia. All GSP jack-up rigs are cantilever type.

GSP has an investment plan for modernization of onboard equipment of the drilling rigs. Since 2004, GSP has invested over $500 million in the acquisition and modernization of its vessels and drilling rigs.

==== Drilling activities ====
- Directional and Horizontal Drilling
- Maintenance and Repairs
- Offshore and Onshore Wells Design
- Rig Moving Operations
- Tender assist drilling and workover operations
- Engineering and Technical Consultancy
- Side Tracking and Re-entries
- Fishing Jobs
- Drilling Fluids Engineering
- Conductor Hammering
- Wells Production Stimulation

=== Well Services ===
GSP performs well stimulation and workover planning and operating:

- Engineering and Design of Workover projects
- Workover Operation
- Coil Tubing: Fishing, Acid and Nitrogen Pumping
- Wells Production Stimulation (Fracking, Acidisation)
- Manpower
- Fishing Jobs
- Wire Line Operation

=== Offshore Construction ===
GSP provides steel assemblies fabricated in GSP Shipyard, the offshore construction dedicated fabrication facility. The company's structural steel fabrication offering includes jackets, decks, accommodation modules and modular platforms.

Offshore construction services:

- Engineering and Design of Offshore Installations
- Onshore Fabrication and Assembly Yards (Berth 34 Constanta, Midia North Constanta, Agigea South Constanta)
- Midia Pipeyard and Machine Shop
- Onshore Heavy Lift Equipment up to 550 t
- Load-out, Seafasteningand Transportation
- On Site Installation, Wind turbine erection
- Subsea Pipe Line, Umbilical and Cable Laying
- Saturation diving and ROV operation
- Commissioning and Operation
- Manpower

=== Subsea Services ===
The company has developed subsea installation capabilities by acquiring top high-tech subsea survey and SAT diving equipment. Simultaneously, GSP initiated a certification program, sustained by a specialized professional team.

GSP's subsea installation services focus on remotely operated vehicles (ROV) and saturation diving.

Services include: subsea installation, maintenance, inspection, survey, SAT diving and underwater engineering.

=== Offshore Windmill ===
GSP also has one-stop services for the offshore wind energy industry, including general contractor, fabrication, installation, logistics, maintenance and project management.

=== Training ===
GSP Training Center was established in 2009. The center offers drilling and maritime regulations courses and is equipped with a drilling simulator (DrillSIM-600). In 2010, the center launched its CADET PROGRAM, addressed to graduates specialized in oil and gas, marine and mechanical, hydro-technical and civil engineering and electronics.

== See also ==
- List of oilfield service companies
