= Melrose Resources =

British company

Melrose Resources Plc
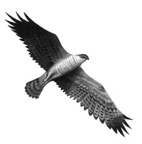
- Type: Public Limited Company
- Traded as: FTSE 250
- Industry: Oil & Gas
- Founded: 1992
- Defunct: 11 October 2012
- Fate: Merger
- Successor: Petroceltic International
- Headquarters: Edinburgh, United Kingdom
- Key people: Robert Adair (Executive Chairman); David Thomas (CEO)
- Revenue: ▲US$291,000,000 (2011)

Melrose Resources plc was an independent upstream oil and gas E&P company founded in 1992, it was first listed on the London Stock Exchange in 1999. The company was headquartered in Edinburgh, UK with international offices in the countries where its operations were located. Its activities were focused on Egypt, Bulgaria, France, Romania, Turkey and the United States.

The company merged with Petroceltic International in 2012.

== History ==
The company was formed in 1992 by Robert Adair to exploit international oil opportunities. It was first listed. In 2004 the company successfully developed the Galata gas field in Bulgaria. In 2006, the company acquired Merlon Petroleum, an oil business with which it shared interests in Egypt.

In October 2012, Melrose Resources merged with Dublin-based Petroceltic International plc in a share for share deal worth $222m, this added new exploration assets in Algeria, Kurdistan and Italy to the existing Melrose portfolio and formed an enlarged oil and gas exploration and production company. Petroceltic was acquired by Worldview Capital Management, a Cayman Island-based financial fund in June 2016.
