= GSP Atlas =

History
- Name: GSP Atlas
- Owner: Grup Servicii Petroliere
- Port of registry: Malta
- Builder: Galați shipyard
- Completed: 1987
- Identification: IMO number: 8767616; MMSI number: 249312000; Callsign: 9HPF9
- Status: Operational

General characteristics
- Class & type: Germanischer Lloyd Germanischer Lloyd, four legs, self elevating unit, cantilever type
- Length: 52.42 m (172.0 ft)
- Beam: 40.8 m (134 ft)
- Draft: 9.75 m (32.0 ft)
- Depth: 6.4 m (21 ft)
- Installed power: 8430 hp
- Crew: 90+2 Hospital

GSP Atlas is a four-legged jack-up rig, cantilever type with self-elevating unit operated by Grup Servicii Petroliere.

== Description ==
GSP Atlas drilling rig was designed by Sonnat Offshore and was built in the Galați shipyard in 1987. The rig was upgraded in 2007.

GSP Atlas has a length of 52.42 metres (172.0 ft), breadth of 40.8 metres (134 ft), depth of 6.4 metres (21 ft) and draft of 9.75 metres (32.0 ft), . It has a maximum drilling depth of 7,620 metres (25,000 ft) and it can at a water depth of 91 metres (300 ft). As a drilling rig, GSP Atlas is equipped with advanced drilling equipment and has to meet strict levels of certification under international law. GSP Atlas is able to maneuver with its own engines (to counter drift and ocean currents), but for long-distance relocation it must be moved by specialist tugboats. The rig is capable of withstanding severe sea conditions, including waves of 12 metres (39 ft).
