= Petrom =

Romanian integrated oil company

OMV Petrom S.A.
- Type: Societate pe Acțiuni
- Traded as: BVB: SNP
- Industry: Oil and gas industry
- Founded: 1991
- Headquarters: PetromCity, Bucharest, Romania
- Key people: Christina Verchere (CEO)
- Products: Petroleum products Petrochemicals; Microelectronics chemicals
- Revenue: ▲RON 32.1 billion (€6.3 billion) (2025)
- Net income: ▼RON 3 billion (€614.7 million) (2025)
- Total assets: ▼RON 58.9 billion (€11.6 billion) (2025)
- Number of employees: 6,701 (2025)
- Parent: OMV (51%); Romanian Government (20%)
- Website: www.omvpetrom.com

OMV Petrom S.A. is a Romanian integrated oil company, controlled by Austria's OMV. It is one of the largest corporations in Romania and the largest oil and gas producer in Southeast Europe. Since 2004 it is a subsidiary of OMV. With 2022 revenue of EUR 12.5 billion, as of 2023, OMV Petrom is the largest company in Romania.

== History ==
In late 2004, Petrom was privatized by the Romanian state and sold to Austrian oil company OMV, which acquired of the previous SNP Petrom SA. As of 2005, it was the largest privatization deal in Romania's history.

Until 2005, Petrom owned six offshore drilling platforms, of which five, GSP Atlas, GSP Jupiter, GSP Orizont, GSP Prometeu and GSP Saturn were sold to Grup Servicii Petroliere for US$100 million.

In January 2006, Petrom purchased OMV's operations in Romania, Bulgaria and Serbia and Montenegro. As a result of the transaction, the gas station networks of OMV were transferred to Petrom, but continued to operate under the OMV brand.

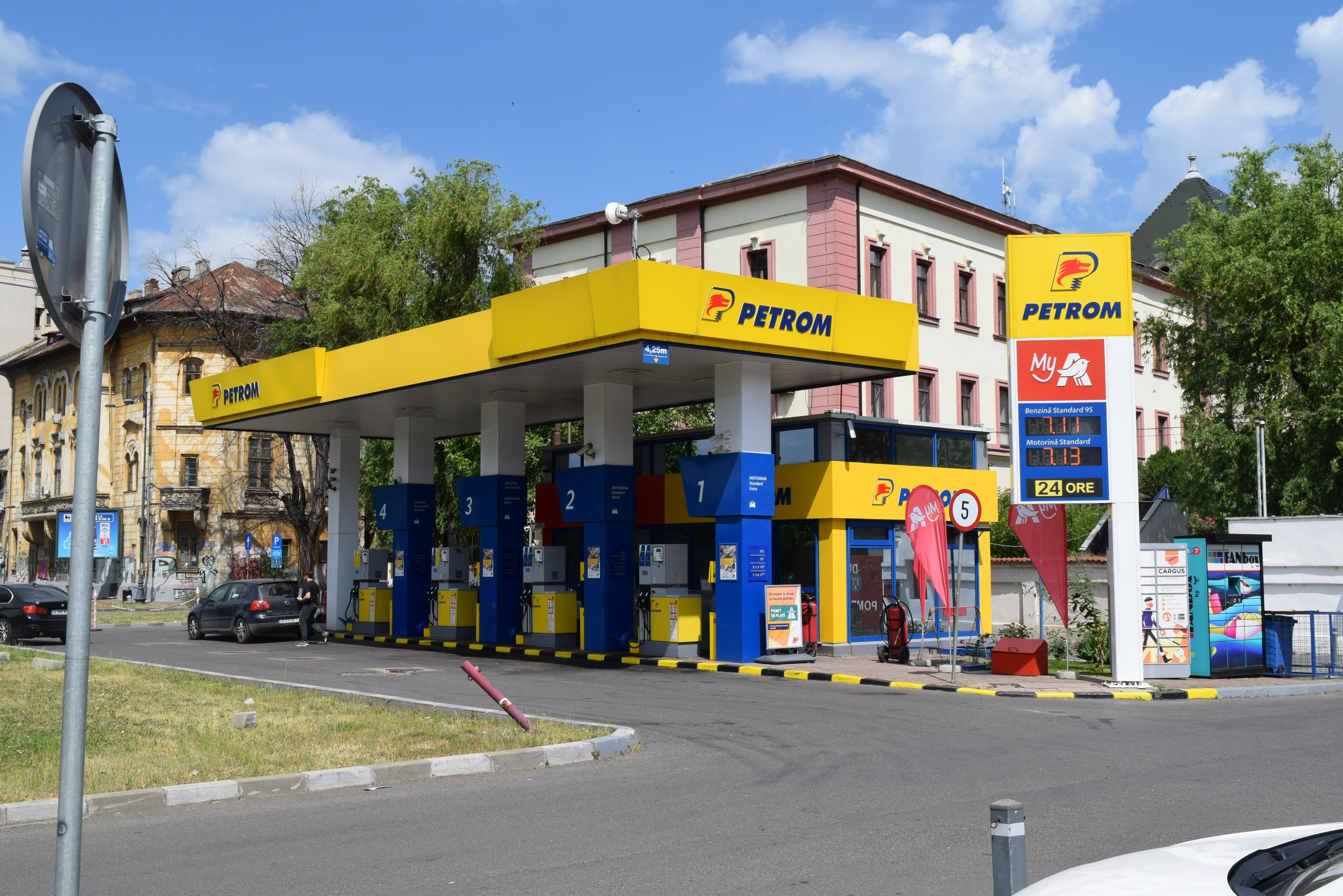
Typical Petrom gas station in Bucharest, Romania

From 1 January 2010, the company changed its name to OMV Petrom.

In April 2010, OMV Petrom expanded the portfolio of its projects, in terms of electricity production, through the acquisition of 100% of the SC Wind Power Park SRL, a developer of the Dorobanţu Wind Farm.

On May 18, 2010, OMV Petrom announced the conclusion of an offshore campaign in the Lebăda Est and Lebăda Vest fields, located at the Histria block in the Black Sea. Following this offshore campaign, additional production of more than 300,000 boe was expected in 2010, from two existing wells (LO2 and LO4) and a new well drilled (LV05).

On June 1, 2010, OMV Petrom announced the start-up of the Hurezani gas delivery system, a project intended to optimize gas delivery into the national transportation network in periods when pressure in the system was very high.

On July 12, 2010, OMV Petrom announced the signing of a 15-year production enhancement contract for several fields in the area of Țicleni, Southwest Romania, with Petrofac, a leading international provider of facilities solutions to the oil and gas production and processing industry. Petrofac will perform services in the respective fields in order to maximize production while improving operational efficiency. The partnership targets cumulative production enhancement out of nine onshore fields in the Țicleni area by at least 50% in the next five years.

On September 6, 2010, OMV Petrom announced the sale of the 74.9% stake in Ring Oil (Russia) to its minority partner Mineral and Bio Oil Fuels Limited (MBO).

From October 1, 2010, OMV Petrom has completed the consolidation of marketing activities in Romania in a single entity, OMV Petrom Marketing SRL.

PetromCity, located in northern Bucharest, serves as the company headquarters

On December 2, 2010, OMV Petrom inaugurated Petrom City, the headquarters that hosts the company's central operations. Situated in the northern part of Bucharest, it will be used by around 2,500 employees from 7 headquarters of the company in Bucharest and Ploiești. The employee relocation process started in the fourth quarter of 2010 and was estimated to be finalized in the first half of 2011.

In 2010, OMV Petrom inaugurated the Hurezani gas delivery system, designed to optimize gas supply to the national transport network. The system included a new compressor station at Bulbuceni, and 11.5 kilometres (7.1 mi) of new pipe station. There was a new measurement system of the gas delivery point Hurezani, to adapt to changing parameters of the gas flow and pressure. The total investment budgeted amounted to about 135 million euros.

OMV Petrom ceased importing Russian crude oil in April 2022, stating that it would instead buy crude oil for its refinery from other sources even if prices were more expensive. At the time, it was the largest energy company in Romania. Romanian investment fund Fondul Proprietatea sold the entirety of its shares in OMV Petrom in December 2022. The stake equated to roughly 2.9% of OMV Petrom's overall value, at $$159.45 million. OMV Petrom remained primarily owned by OMV in Austria. In early 2023, the company reported that it had revenues of RON 61.3 billion (EUR 12.5 billion) in 2022, which was 2.4 times higher than revenues in 2021. At the time, it was the largest company in Romania.

In February 2023 Christina Verchere remained CEO of OMV Petrom, stating the company was "closer than ever" to beginning construction on its Neptun Deep gas project in the Black Sea, with a final financial decision about the project to be made by OMV in the middle of 2023. First gas extractions were expected for 2027. OMV Petrom had taken over as operator of the project in 2022 from ExxonMobil. Development drilling at the gas field began in March 2025 and in May 2026 construction on a pipeline was started.

With the aim of including OMV Petrom among the companies required to pay significant profits to the Romanian government, in March 2023, it was reported that lawmakers and government members in Romania were working on "amending the solidarity contribution calculation methodology." OMV Petrom had previously declared it was not liable to pay the solidarity contributions, due to existing regulations. For companies that produce and refine crude oil, the 2022 Romanian solidarity law introduced to take surplus profits, gave the obligation to pay RON 350 for each tonne of crude oil processed in 2022 and 2023.

In May 2024, OMV Petrom bought Renovatio Asset Management, a company that operates an electric vehicle charging network in Romania. OMV Petrom acquired photovoltaic projects with an expected capacity of 700 MW from Jantzen Renewables in September 2024. In September 2025, OMV Petrom purchased a 50 % share in a 400 MW capacity photovoltaic project developed by Enery in Bulgaria.

Exterior view of the 10-story tower at OMV Petrom’s headquarters in Bucharest, leased by Genesis College.

In January 2026, it was announced that OMV Petrom had agreed to sell a 5 per cent participating interest in the Han Asparuh offshore exploration block in the Bulgarian sector of the Black Sea to Bulgarian Energy Holding EAD. The transaction formed part of a government-directed transfer of licence interests and was subject to regulatory approval and amendments to the joint operating agreement.

In May 2024, the private school Genesis College announced that it had entered into a lease for the entire 10-story tower of OMV Petrom’s headquarters. Representatives of OMV Petrom stated that the office space had become available because of increased remote work, thus the company was seeking the best option to lease the space. In September 2025, Genesis College officially reopened the renovated building, relocating its primary, middle, and high school departments, along with an updated logo on the building.

== Operations ==
Apart from its operations in Romania, the company operates in Bulgaria, Serbia, Hungary, Moldova, Kazakhstan, Iran and Russia. In Moldova, OMV Petrom has operated 73 filling stations, being one of the leading oil companies, alongside Lukoil. In Hungary, there have been at least 2 OMV Petrom filling stations.

OMV Petrom has operated in several countries:

- Romania - largest company;
- Moldova - 2nd largest company, 31% market share;
- Bulgaria - 3rd largest company, 18% market share;
- Serbia and Montenegro - 3rd largest company, 13% market share.

In 2007 the company produced 5.5 billion cubic metres (190 billion cubic feet) of natural gas and 191,000 barrels per day (30,400 m^{3}/d) of crude oil.

=== Aktas oil field ===
Aktas Oil Field
- Country: Kazakhstan
- Region: Mangystau Province
- Offshore/onshore: onshore
- Operator: Petrom

Field history
- Discovery: 1997
- Start of development: 1997
- Start of production: 2009

Production
- Current production of oil: 1,000 barrels per day (~50,000 t/a)
- Estimated oil in place: 5.7 million tonnes (~ 6.7×10^{6} m^{3} or 42 million bbl)

The Aktas Oil Field is an oil field located in Mangystau Province. It was discovered in 1997 and developed, operated and owned by Petrom. The total proven reserves of the Aktas oil field are around 42 million barrels (5.7 million tonnes), and production is centered on 1,000 barrels per day (160 m^{3}/d).

== Privatization controversy ==
The OMV Petrom privatization took place during the last months of the Adrian Năstase government. In December 2004, OMV obtained a 51% stake in SNP Petrom SA.

Major Romanian newspapers published articles criticising the privatization of Petrom, on the grounds that last-minute unadvertised moves gave Petrom all of Romania's oil and gas reserves just before the privatization contract was signed. It was claimed that this move gave away the control of the country's national resources.

As a consequence, OMV Petrom has a de facto monopoly on the oil production of Romania. Moreover, the state did not impose price controlling clauses in the privatization contract, so that Romanian-produced petroleum is sold in Romania at the same price as imported petroleum.

== OMV Petrom Bucharest International Half Marathon ==
The second edition of OMV Petrom Bucharest International Half Marathon (2013) was organized by Bucharest Running Club Association in cooperation with the Romanian Athletic Federation and Bucharest City Hall. Petrom supported the second edition of the half marathon as leading sponsor.

Over 6,000 people from 43 countries have run at this edition of the event.

=== Half Marathon Winners ===
Rank	Men		Time	Women		Time
1	Kirui Nicholas Kipngeno	Kenya	1h 04' 07"	Naali Mary Xwaymay	Tanzania	1h 16' 32"
2	Lesuuda Andrew Papasio	Kenya	1h 04' 53"	Alebachew Selam Abere	Ethiopia	1h 18' 20"
3	Kanda Japhet Kimutai	Kenya	1h 07' 12"	Nicoleta-Alina Petrescu	Romania	1h 20' 24"
4	Maritim Kipkoech	Kenya	1h 09' 04"	Rodean Ana-Veronica	Romania	1h 24' 51"
5	Slimani Benazzouz	Morocco	1h 10' 12"	Grădinariu Alexandra	Romania	1h 30' 26"

The second edition of OMV Petrom Bucharest International Half Marathon took place on 19 May in Constitution Square, Bucharest. The competition included 4 competitive races: half marathon (21.097 km), team relay (4 x 5.3 km) individual race (10.5 km), popular race (3.5 km) and one uncompetitive race, kids’ race (4-12 y.o.).

== Rankings and awards ==
- 1st in “The most valuable company in Romania” lists made by “Ziarul Financiar” in 2005-2011
- Trophy for “Excellence in Investments in Southeastern Europe” awarded by the Chamber of Commerce and Industry of Romania in 2005
- 1st in the “Top Companies in Sector 1” list made by the Chamber of Commerce and Industry of Romania in 2008-2009
- 1st in the “National Awards for companies in Romania” offered by the Chamber of Commerce and Industry of Romania in 2008-2009
- 1st in the “Leading Company in Romania” list made by Finmedia in 2008, 2010, 2011
- 1st in the “Non-financial companies and capitalization” list made by Finmedia in 2009
- 1st in “The largest sponsor and the corporation with the largest impact in the history of Habitat for Humanity Romania and Europe” list made by Habitat for Humanity in 2009
- 1st in “The largest company in Southeastern Europe” made by SeeNews in 2010-2011
- Safety Award - Sustainable Impact on Business for the project "Improvement of Safety Culture" offered by Dupont în 2010
- 1st as the “Best CSR program - Andrei's School” in 2010
- 1st in “The largest oil company in Romania” list made by “Ziarul Financiar” in 2012
- 1st in the “Top 100 Companies” list made by Finmedia in 2012
- 1st in “The (emitent) with the largest capitalization B.V.B.” list made by BVB in 2012
- 1st in the “Best CSR strategy” list made by the Association for Community relations and AmCham, during the People for People Gala in 2012
- Won the auction for a perimeter of exploitation gas and crude oil from the Black Sea, in Georgia's offshore area.
