= Dehnow, Asaluyeh =

Village in Bushehr province, Iran

Dehnow Persian: ده نو
- Village
- Location within Iran
- Coordinates: 27°27′03″N 52°44′18″E
- Country: Iran
- Province: Bushehr
- County: Asaluyeh
- District: Central
- Rural District: Akhand

Population (2016)
  - Total: 1,930
- Time zone: UTC+3:30 (IRST)

Dehnow (Persian: ده نو) (Note: Also romanized as Deh-i-Nau) is a village in Akhand Rural District of the Central District in Asaluyeh County, Bushehr province, Iran.

== Demographics ==
=== Population ===
At the time of the 2006 National Census, the village's population was 596 in 90 households, when it was in Asaluyeh Rural District of the former Asaluyeh District in Kangan County. The following census in 2011 counted 968 people in 224 households. The 2016 census measured the population of the village as 1,930 people in 399 households, by which time the district had been separated from the county in the establishment of Asaluyeh County. The rural district was transferred to the new Central District, and Dehnow was transferred to Akhand Rural District created in the district.
