= Kalat, Asaluyeh =

Village in Bushehr province, Iran

Kalat Persian: كلات
- Village
- Location within Iran
- Coordinates: 27°27′35″N 52°43′55″E
- Country: Iran
- Province: Bushehr
- County: Asaluyeh
- District: Central
- Rural District: Akhand

Population (2016)
  - Total: 729
- Time zone: UTC+3:30 (IRST)

Kalat (Persian: كلات, romanized: Kalāt) is a village in Akhand Rural District of the Central District in Asaluyeh County, Bushehr province, Iran.

== Demographics ==
=== Population ===
At the time of the 2006 National Census, the village's population was 333 in 70 households, when it was in Asaluyeh Rural District of the former Asaluyeh District in Kangan County. The following census in 2011 counted 564 people in 153 households. The 2016 census measured the population of the village as 729 people in 233 households, by which time the district had been separated from the county in the establishment of Asaluyeh County. The rural district was transferred to the new Central District, and Kalat was transferred to Akhand Rural District created in the district.
