= Akhand =

Village in Bushehr province, Iran

Akhand Persian: اخند
- Village
- Location within Iran
- Coordinates: 27°26′10″N 52°45′08″E
- Country: Iran
- Province: Bushehr
- County: Asaluyeh
- District: Central
- Rural District: Akhand

Population (2016)
  - Total: 6,775
- Time zone: UTC+3:30 (IRST)

Akhand (Persian: اخند) (Note: Also romanized as Akhand; also known as Ākhownd and Ākhūnd) is a village in, and the capital of, Akhand Rural District in the Central District of Asaluyeh County, Bushehr province, Iran.

== Demographics ==
=== Population ===
At the time of the 2006 National Census, the village's population was 2,492 in 455 households, when it was in Asaluyeh Rural District of the former Asaluyeh District in Kangan County. The following census in 2011 counted 2,918 people in 618 households. The 2016 census measured the population of the village as 6,775 people in 906 households, by which time the district had been separated from the county in the establishment of Asaluyeh County. The rural district was transferred to the new Central District, and the village was transferred to Akhand Rural District created in the district. Akhand was the most populous village in its rural district.
