= Bostanu, Bushehr =

Village in Bushehr province, Iran

Bostanu Persian: بستانو
- Village
- Location within Iran
- Coordinates: 27°23′42″N 52°46′47″E
- Country: Iran
- Province: Bushehr
- County: Asaluyeh
- District: Chah-e Mobarak
- Rural District: Chah-e Mobarak

Population (2016)
  - Total: 1,870
- Time zone: UTC+3:30 (IRST)

Bostanu (Persian: بستانو) (Note: Also romanized as Bestanoo and Bostānū; also known as Bustānu) is a village in Chah-e Mobarak Rural District of Chah-e Mobarak District in Asaluyeh County, Bushehr province, Iran.

== Demographics ==
=== Population ===
At the time of the 2006 National Census, the village's population was 969 in 171 households, when it was in Nayband Rural District of the former Asaluyeh District in Kangan County. The following census in 2011 counted 1,330 people in 300 households. The 2016 census measured the population of the village as 1,870 people in 440 households, by which time the district had been separated from the county in the establishment of Asaluyeh County. The rural district was transferred to the new Chah-e Mobarak District, and Bostanu was transferred to Chah-e Mobarak Rural District created in the district.
