= Askari, Asaluyeh =

Village in Bushehr province, Iran

Askari Persian: عسكري
- Village
- Location within Iran
- Coordinates: 27°25′05″N 52°45′08″E
- Country: Iran
- Province: Bushehr
- County: Asaluyeh
- District: Central
- Rural District: Akhand

Population (2016)
  - Total: 907
- Time zone: UTC+3:30 (IRST)

Askari (Persian: عسكري) (Note: Also romanized as Askari; also known as Asgari and ‘Asgarī) is a village in Akhand Rural District of the Central District in Asaluyeh County, Bushehr province, Iran.

== Demographics ==
=== Population ===
At the time of the 2006 National Census, the village's population was 626 in 93 households, when it was in Asaluyeh Rural District of the former Asaluyeh District in Kangan County. The following census in 2011 counted 847 people in 173 households. The 2016 census measured the population of the village as 907 people in 216 households, by which time the district had been separated from the county in the establishment of Asaluyeh County. The rural district was transferred to the new Central District, and Askari was transferred to Akhand Rural District created in the district.
