= Savahel =

Village in Bushehr province, Iran

Savahel Persian: سواحل
- Village
- Location within Iran
- Coordinates: 27°21′11″N 52°48′44″E
- Country: Iran
- Province: Bushehr
- County: Asaluyeh
- District: Chah-e Mobarak
- Rural District: Chah-e Mobarak

Population (2016)
  - Total: 505
- Time zone: UTC+3:30 (IRST)

Savahel (Persian: سواحل) (Note: Also romanized as Savāḩel) is a village in Chah-e Mobarak Rural District of Chah-e Mobarak District in Asaluyeh County, Bushehr province, Iran.

== Demographics ==
=== Population ===
At the time of the 2006 National Census, the village's population was 375 in 69 households, when it was in Nayband Rural District of the former Asaluyeh District in Kangan County. The following census in 2011 counted 384 people in 66 households. The 2016 census measured the population of the village as 505 people in 124 households, by which time the district had been separated from the county in the establishment of Asaluyeh County. The rural district was transferred to the new Chah-e Mobarak District, and Savahel was transferred to Chah-e Mobarak Rural District created in the district.
