= Kheyaru =

Village in Bushehr province, Iran

Kheyaru Persian: خيارو
- Village
- Location within Iran
- Coordinates: 27°24′21″N 52°45′16″E
- Country: Iran
- Province: Bushehr
- County: Asaluyeh
- District: Chah-e Mobarak
- Rural District: Chah-e Mobarak

Population (2016)
  - Total: 756
- Time zone: UTC+3:30 (IRST)

Kheyaru (Persian: خيارو) (Note: Also romanized as Kheyārū, Khīārū, Khiyaroo, and Khīyārū) is a village in Chah-e Mobarak Rural District of Chah-e Mobarak District in Asaluyeh County, Bushehr province, Iran.

== Demographics ==
=== Population ===
At the time of the 2006 National Census, the village's population was 520 in 77 households, when it was in Nayband Rural District of the former Asaluyeh District in Kangan County. The following census in 2011 counted 655 people in 132 households. The 2016 census measured the population of the village as 756 people in 197 households, by which time the district had been separated from the county in the establishment of Asaluyeh County. The rural district was transferred to the new Chah-e Mobarak District, and Kheyaru was transferred to Chah-e Mobarak Rural District created in the district.
