= Besatin =

Village in Bushehr province, Iran

Besatin Persian: بساتين
- Village
- Location within Iran
- Coordinates: 27°23′06″N 52°39′45″E
- Country: Iran
- Province: Bushehr
- County: Asaluyeh
- District: Chah-e Mobarak
- Rural District: Nayband

Population (2016)
  - Total: 1,244
- Time zone: UTC+3:30 (IRST)

Besatin (Persian: بساتين) (Note: Also romanized as Basātīn and Besātīn; also known as Busālin) is a village in Nayband Rural District of Chah-e Mobarak District in Asaluyeh County, Bushehr province, Iran.

== Demographics ==
=== Population ===
At the time of the 2006 National Census, the village's population was 638 in 108 households, when it was in the former Asaluyeh District of Kangan County. The following census in 2011 counted 922 people in 120 households. The 2016 census measured the population of the village as 1,244 people in 250 households, by which time the district had been separated from the county in the establishment of Asaluyeh County. The rural district was transferred to the new Chah-e Mobarak District. Besatin was the most populous village in its rural district.
