= Kherreh, Bushehr =

Village in Bushehr province, Iran

Kherreh Persian: خره
- Village
- Location within Iran
- Coordinates: 27°19′15″N 52°46′49″E
- Country: Iran
- Province: Bushehr
- County: Asaluyeh
- District: Chah-e Mobarak
- Rural District: Nayband

Population (2016)
  - Total: 777
- Time zone: UTC+3:30 (IRST)

Kherreh (Persian: خره) (Note: Also romanized as Kharreh) is a village in Nayband Rural District of Chah-e Mobarak District in Asaluyeh County, Bushehr province, Iran.

== Demographics ==
=== Population ===
At the time of the 2006 National Census, the village's population was 480 in 67 households, when it was in the former Asaluyeh District of Kangan County. The following census in 2011 counted 578 people in 119 households. The 2016 census measured the population of the village as 777 people in 165 households, by which time the district had been separated from the county in the establishment of Asaluyeh County. The rural district was transferred to the new Chah-e Mobarak District.
