= Sahmui-ye Jonubi =

Village in Bushehr province, Iran

Sahmui-ye Jonubi Persian: سهموي جنوبي
- Village
- Location within Iran
- Coordinates: 27°20′26″N 52°50′20″E
- Country: Iran
- Province: Bushehr
- County: Asaluyeh
- District: Chah-e Mobarak
- Rural District: Chah-e Mobarak

Population (2016)
  - Total: 1,225
- Time zone: UTC+3:30 (IRST)

Sahmui-ye Jonubi (Persian: سهموي جنوبي) (Note: Also romanized as Sahmūī-ye Jonūbī; also known as Sahmoo Jonoobi, Sahmū, Sahmū Janūbī, Sahmū Pā’īn, Sahmū-e Pā’īn, Sahmū-ye Janūbī, and Sahmū-ye Jonūbī) is a village in Chah-e Mobarak Rural District of Chah-e Mobarak District in Asaluyeh County, Bushehr province, Iran.

== Demographics ==
=== Population ===
At the time of the 2006 National Census, the village's population was 756 in 114 households, when it was in Nayband Rural District of the former Asaluyeh District in Kangan County. The following census in 2011 counted 1,039 people in 239 households. The 2016 census measured the population of the village as 1,225 people in 320 households, by which time the district had been separated from the county in the establishment of Asaluyeh County. The rural district was transferred to the new Chah-e Mobarak District, and Sahmui-ye Jonubi was transferred to Chah-e Mobarak Rural District created in the district.
