= Bandu, Asaluyeh =

Village in Bushehr province, Iran

Bandu Persian: بندو
- Village
- Location within Iran
- Coordinates: 27°19′25″N 52°51′48″E
- Country: Iran
- Province: Bushehr
- County: Asaluyeh
- District: Chah-e Mobarak
- Rural District: Chah-e Mobarak

Population (2016)
  - Total: 738
- Time zone: UTC+3:30 (IRST)

Bandu (Persian: بندو) (Note: Also romanized as Bandoo and Bandū) is a village in Chah-e Mobarak Rural District of Chah-e Mobarak District in Asaluyeh County, Bushehr province, Iran.

== Demographics ==
=== Population ===
At the time of the 2006 National Census, the village's population was 571 in 90 households, when it was in Nayband Rural District of the former Asaluyeh District in Kangan County. The following census in 2011 counted 621 people in 137 households. The 2016 census measured the population of the village as 738 people in 186 households, by which time the district had been separated from the county in the establishment of Asaluyeh County. The rural district was transferred to the new Chah-e Mobarak District, and Bandu was transferred to Chah-e Mobarak Rural District created in the district.
