= Moru, Iran =

Village in Bushehr province, Iran

Moru Persian: مروع
- Village
- Location within Iran
- Coordinates: 27°21′12″N 52°48′24″E
- Country: Iran
- Province: Bushehr
- County: Asaluyeh
- District: Chah-e Mobarak
- Rural District: Chah-e Mobarak

Population (2016)
  - Total: 656
- Time zone: UTC+3:30 (IRST)

Moru (Persian: مروع) (Note: Also romanized as Morrū‘ and Morū‘; also known as Maroo’i) is a village in Chah-e Mobarak Rural District of Chah-e Mobarak District in Asaluyeh County, Bushehr province, Iran.

== Demographics ==
=== Population ===
At the time of the 2006 National Census, the village's population was 375 in 62 households, when it was in Nayband Rural District of the former Asaluyeh District in Kangan County. The following census in 2011 counted 462 people in 90 households. The 2016 census measured the population of the village as 656 people in 156 households, by which time the district had been separated from the county in the establishment of Asaluyeh County. The rural district was transferred to the new Chah-e Mobarak District, and Moru was transferred to Chah-e Mobarak Rural District created in the district.
