= Haleh, Iran =

Village in Bushehr province, Iran

Haleh Persian: هاله
- Village
- Location within Iran
- Coordinates: 27°23′48″N 52°38′21″E
- Country: Iran
- Province: Bushehr
- County: Asaluyeh
- District: Chah-e Mobarak
- Rural District: Nayband

Population (2016)
  - Total: 986
- Time zone: UTC+3:30 (IRST)

Haleh (Persian: هاله) (Note: Also romanized as Hāleh and Hālleh; also known as Hāleh-ye Jonūbī) is a village in Nayband Rural District of Chah-e Mobarak District in Asaluyeh County, Bushehr province, Iran.

== Demographics ==
=== Population ===
At the time of the 2006 National Census, the village's population was 641 in 97 households, when it was in the former Asaluyeh District of Kangan County. The following census in 2011 counted 726 people in 130 households. The 2016 census measured the population of the village as 986 people in 233 households, by which time the district had been separated from the county in the establishment of Asaluyeh County. The rural district was transferred to the new Chah-e Mobarak District.
