= Safiyeh =

Village in Bushehr province, Iran

Safiyeh Persian: صفيه
- Village
- Location within Iran
- Coordinates: 27°21′57″N 52°41′23″E
- Country: Iran
- Province: Bushehr
- County: Asaluyeh
- District: Chah-e Mobarak
- Rural District: Nayband

Population (2016)
  - Total: 157
- Time zone: UTC+3:30 (IRST)

Safiyeh (Persian: صفيه) (Note: Also romanized as Şafeyeh, Şafīyeh, Safīyeh, and Safyeh) is a village in Nayband Rural District of Chah-e Mobarak District in Asaluyeh County, Bushehr province, Iran.

== Demographics ==
=== Population ===
At the time of the 2006 National Census, the village's population was 112 in 18 households, when it was in the former Asaluyeh District of Kangan County. The following census in 2011 counted 130 people in 23 households. The 2016 census measured the population of the village as 157 people in 33 households, by which time the district had been separated from the county in the establishment of Asaluyeh County. The rural district was transferred to the new Chah-e Mobarak District.
