= Zobar =

Village in Bushehr province, Iran

Zobar Persian: زبار
- Village
- Location within Iran
- Coordinates: 27°21′37″N 52°42′00″E
- Country: Iran
- Province: Bushehr
- County: Asaluyeh
- District: Chah-e Mobarak
- Rural District: Nayband

Population (2016)
  - Total: 1,138
- Time zone: UTC+3:30 (IRST)

Zobar (Persian: زبار) (Note: Also romanized as Zebar and Zobār; also known as Zāwar) is a village in, and the capital of, Nayband Rural District in Chah-e Mobarak District of Asaluyeh County, Bushehr province, Iran. The previous capital of the rural district was the village of Chah-e Mobarak, now a city.

== Demographics ==
=== Population ===
At the time of the 2006 National Census, the village's population was 810 in 122 households, when it was in the former Asaluyeh District of Kangan County. The following census in 2011 counted 805 people in 142 households. The 2016 census measured the population of the village as 1,138 people in 305 households, by which time the district had been separated from the county in the establishment of Asaluyeh County. The rural district was transferred to the new Chah-e Mobarak District.
