= Konar Kheymeh =

Village in Bushehr province, Iran

Konar Kheymeh Persian: كنارخيمه
- Village
- Location within Iran
- Coordinates: 27°19′34″N 52°45′43″E
- Country: Iran
- Province: Bushehr
- County: Asaluyeh
- District: Chah-e Mobarak
- Rural District: Nayband

Population (2016)
  - Total: 632
- Time zone: UTC+3:30 (IRST)

Konar Kheymeh (Persian: كنارخيمه) (Note: Also romanized as Kenar Kheimeh and Konār Kheymeh; also known as Kinār Khema and Kohneh Kheymeh) is a village in Nayband Rural District of Chah-e Mobarak District in Asaluyeh County, Bushehr province, Iran.

== Demographics ==
=== Population ===
At the time of the 2006 National Census, the village's population was 376 in 49 households, when it was in the former Asaluyeh District of Kangan County. The following census in 2011 counted 486 people in 112 households. The 2016 census measured the population of the village as 632 people in 140 households, by which time the district had been separated from the county in the establishment of Asaluyeh County. The rural district was transferred to the new Chah-e Mobarak District.
