= Sahmui-ye Shomali =

Village in Bushehr province, Iran

Sahmui-ye Shomali Persian: سهموي شمالي
- Village
- Location within Iran
- Coordinates: 27°20′56″N 52°49′22″E
- Country: Iran
- Province: Bushehr
- County: Asaluyeh
- District: Chah-e Mobarak
- Rural District: Chah-e Mobarak

Population (2016)
  - Total: 1,340
- Time zone: UTC+3:30 (IRST)

Sahmui-ye Shomali (Persian: سهموي شمالي) (Note: Also romanized as Sahmūī-ye Shomālī; also known as Sahmoo Shomali, Sahmū Shemālī, and Sahmū-ye Shomālī) is a village in Chah-e Mobarak Rural District of Chah-e Mobarak District in Asaluyeh County, Bushehr province, Iran.

== Demographics ==
=== Population ===
At the time of the 2006 National Census, the village's population was 952 in 126 households, when it was in Nayband Rural District of the former Asaluyeh District in Kangan County. The following census in 2011 counted 1,168 people in 205 households. The 2016 census measured the population of the village as 1,340 people in 322 households, by which time the district had been separated from the county in the establishment of Asaluyeh County. The rural district was transferred to the new Chah-e Mobarak District, and Sahmui-ye Shomali was transferred to Chah-e Mobarak Rural District created in the district.
