= Boz Baz =

Village in Bushehr province, Iran

Boz Baz Persian: بزباز
- Village
- Location within Iran
- Coordinates: 27°28′00″N 52°43′17″E
- Country: Iran
- Province: Bushehr
- County: Asaluyeh
- District: Central
- Rural District: Asaluyeh

Population (2016)
  - Total: 2,286
- Time zone: UTC+3:30 (IRST)

Boz Baz (Persian: بزباز) (Note: Also romanized as Boz Bāz, Bozbāz, and Bozboz) is a village in Asaluyeh Rural District of the Central District in Asaluyeh County, Bushehr province, Iran.

== Demographics ==
=== Population ===
At the time of the 2006 National Census, the village's population was 394 in 91 households, when it was in the former Asaluyeh District of Kangan County. The following census in 2011 counted 805 people in 216 households. The 2016 census measured the population of the village as 2,286 people in 427 households, by which time the district had been separated from the county in the establishment of Asaluyeh County. The rural district was transferred to the new Central District.
