= Gowd-e Akhand =

Village in Bushehr province, Iran

Gowd-e Akhand Persian: گوداخند
- Village
- Location within Iran
- Coordinates: 27°25′44″N 52°48′37″E
- Country: Iran
- Province: Bushehr
- County: Asaluyeh
- District: Central
- Rural District: Akhand

Population (2016)
  - Total: 44
- Time zone: UTC+3:30 (IRST)

Gowd-e Akhand (Persian: گوداخند) (Note: Also known as Gowd) is a village in Akhand Rural District of the Central District in Asaluyeh County, Bushehr province, Iran.

== Demographics ==
=== Population ===
At the time of the 2006 National Census, the village's population was 44 in five households, when it was in Asaluyeh Rural District of the former Asaluyeh District in Kangan County. The following census in 2011 counted 37 people in five households. The 2016 census measured the population of the village as 44 people in 10 households, by which time the district had been separated from the county in the establishment of Asaluyeh County. The rural district was transferred to the new Central District, and Gowd-e Akhand was transferred to Akhand Rural District created in the district.
