= Bonud =

Village in Bushehr province, Iran

Bonud Persian: بنود
- Village
- Location within Iran
- Coordinates: 27°20′42″N 52°43′35″E
- Country: Iran
- Province: Bushehr
- County: Asaluyeh
- District: Chah-e Mobarak
- Rural District: Nayband

Population (2016)
  - Total: 691
- Time zone: UTC+3:30 (IRST)

Bonud (Persian: بنود) (Note: Also romanized as Banood, Banūd, and Bonūd; also known as Bunūt) is a village in Nayband Rural District of Chah-e Mobarak District in Asaluyeh County, Bushehr province, Iran.

== Demographics ==
=== Population ===
At the time of the 2006 National Census, the village's population was 519 in 77 households, when it was in the former Asaluyeh District of Kangan County. The following census in 2011 counted 558 people in 118 households. The 2016 census measured the population of the village as 691 people in 172 households, by which time the district had been separated from the county in the establishment of Asaluyeh County. The rural district was transferred to the new Chah-e Mobarak District.
