= Shirinu Rural District =

Rural district in Bushehr province, Iran

Shirinu Rural District Persian: دهستان شیرینو
- Rural District
- Location within Iran
- Coordinates: 27°38′N 52°29′E
- Country: Iran
- Province: Bushehr
- County: Kangan
- District: Siraf
- Established: 2019
- Capital: Lavardeh
- Time zone: UTC+3:30 (IRST)

Shirinu Rural District (Persian: دهستان شیرینو) is in Siraf District of Kangan County, Bushehr province, Iran. Its capital is the village of Lavardeh, whose population at the time of the 2016 National Census was 297 people in 71 households. The previous capital of the rural district was the village of Bandar-e Shirinu, (Note: Formerly the village of Shirinu) now a city.

== History ==
In 2019, Taheri Rural District and the city of Bandar Siraf were separated from the Central District in the formation of Siraf District, and Shirinu Rural District was created in the new district.
