= Qaleh-ye Meyan =

Village in Bushehr province, Iran

Qaleh-ye Meyan Persian: قلعه ميان
- Village
- Location within Iran
- Coordinates: 27°46′04″N 52°08′05″E
- Country: Iran
- Province: Bushehr
- County: Kangan
- District: Central
- Rural District: Tombak

Population (2016)
  - Total: 928
- Time zone: UTC+3:30 (IRST)

Qaleh-ye Meyan (Persian: قلعه ميان) (Note: Also romanized as Qal‘eh-ye Meyān; also known as Meyālū, Meyānlū, Mīānlū, Miāntū, Miyalu, Miyan Loo, Mīyānlū, and Qal‘eh Meyānlū) is a village in, and the capital of, Tombak Rural District in the Central District of Kangan County, Bushehr province, Iran.

== Demographics ==
=== Population ===
At the time of the 2006 National Census, the village's population was 350 in 87 households, when it was in Howmeh Rural District. The following census in 2011 counted 359 people in 102 households. The 2016 census measured the population of the village as 928 people in 253 households.

In 2019, Qaleh-ye Meyan was transferred to Tombak Rural District created in the Central District.
