= Bagh Ku =

Bagh Ku باغ كو
- Village
- Location within Iran
- Coordinates: 27°40′08″N 52°19′13″E
- Country: Iran
- Province: Bushehr
- County: Kangan
- Bakhsh: Central
- Rural District: Taheri

Population (2006)
  - Total: 109
- Time zone: UTC+3:30 (IRST)
  - Summer (DST): UTC+4:30 (IRDT)

Bagh Ku (Persian: باغ كو, also Romanized as Bāgh Kū; also known as Bāgh Kūh) is a village in Taheri Rural District, in the Central District of Kangan County, Bushehr Province, Iran. At the 2006 census, its population was 109, in 23 families.
