= Bandar-e Shirinu =

City in Bushehr province, Iran

Bandar-e Shirinu Persian: بندر شیرینو
- City
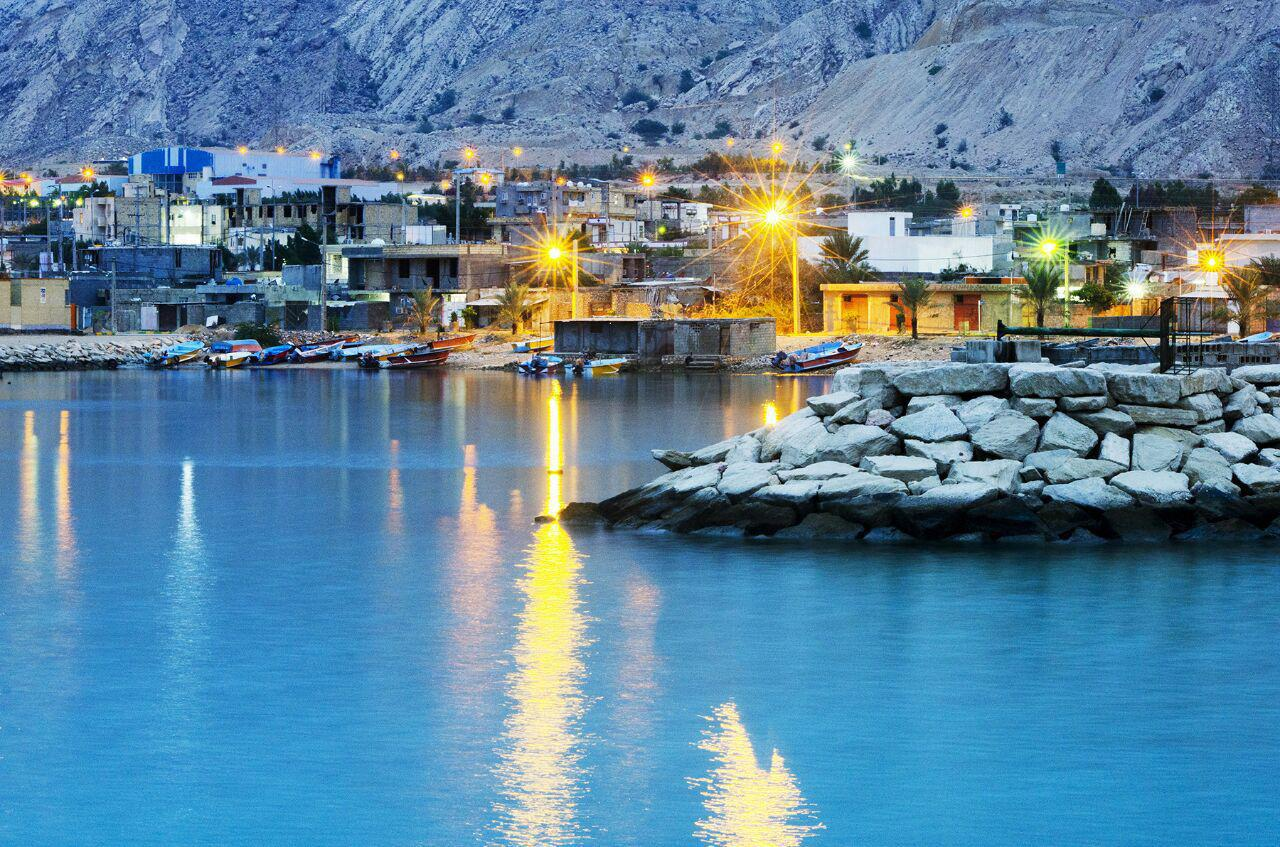
- The city of Bandar-e Shirinu

- Location within Iran
- Coordinates: 27°37′32″N 52°28′30″E
- Country: Iran
- Province: Bushehr
- County: Kangan
- District: Siraf
- Established as a city: 2023

Government
  - Mayor: Seyed Abbas Rezaei

Population (2016)
  - Total: 9,976
- Time zone: UTC+3:30 (IRST)
- Area code: 0773729
- Website: https://shirinoo.ir

Bandar-e Shirinu (Persian: بندر شیرینو) (Note: Also known as Shīrīnnū, Shīrīno, Shirinoo, Shirinu, and Shīrīnū) is a city in Siraf District of Kangan County, Bushehr province, Iran. As a village, it served as the capital of Shirinu Rural District until its capital was transferred to the village of Lavardeh. It is located near the Persian Gulf and is surrounded by the Zagros Mountains to the north. The city is part of the South Pars gas field area, featuring significant oil and gas industries around it.

== Etymology ==
The name "Shirinu" is associated with the ancient port of Thalath, recognized historically during the Safavid period, as well as being known for three golden palm trees that produced exceptionally sweet dates. This port has significant cultural and historical value.

== Demographics ==
=== Population ===
At the time of the 2006 National Census, the population was 1,160 in 266 households, when it was the village of Shirinu in Taheri Rural District of the Central District. The following census in 2011 counted 3,441 people in 689 households. The 2016 census measured the population of the village as 9,976 people in 1,087 households. It was the most populous village in its rural district.

In 2019, the rural district was separated from the district in the formation of Siraf District, and Shirinu was transferred to Shirinu Rural District created in the new district. The village was converted to a city in 2023.

== Geography ==
Bandar-e Shirinu is bordered to the north by the Zagros Mountains, to the south by the Persian Gulf, to the west by the village of Parak, and to the east by the city of Nakhl Taqi. The city hosts several attractions, including a tourism village established in 2016 which offers recreational activities, sea sports, and local cuisine.

== Notable people ==
- Ebrahim Bahmani (born 1991), politician

== Gallery ==
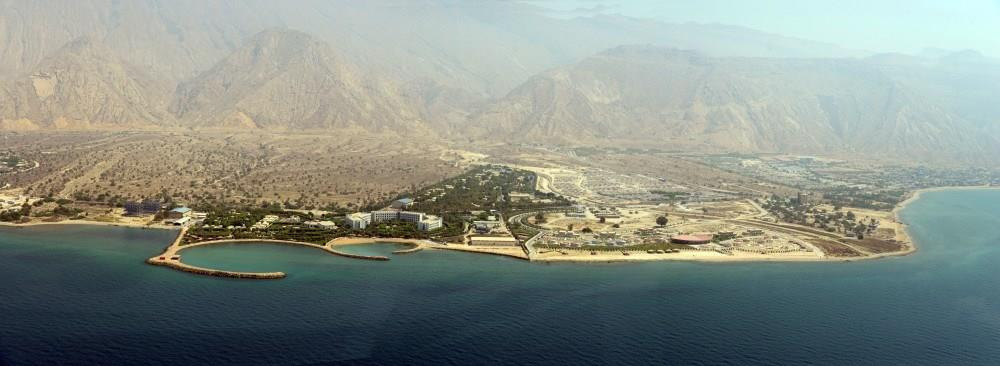
The Port of Shirinu

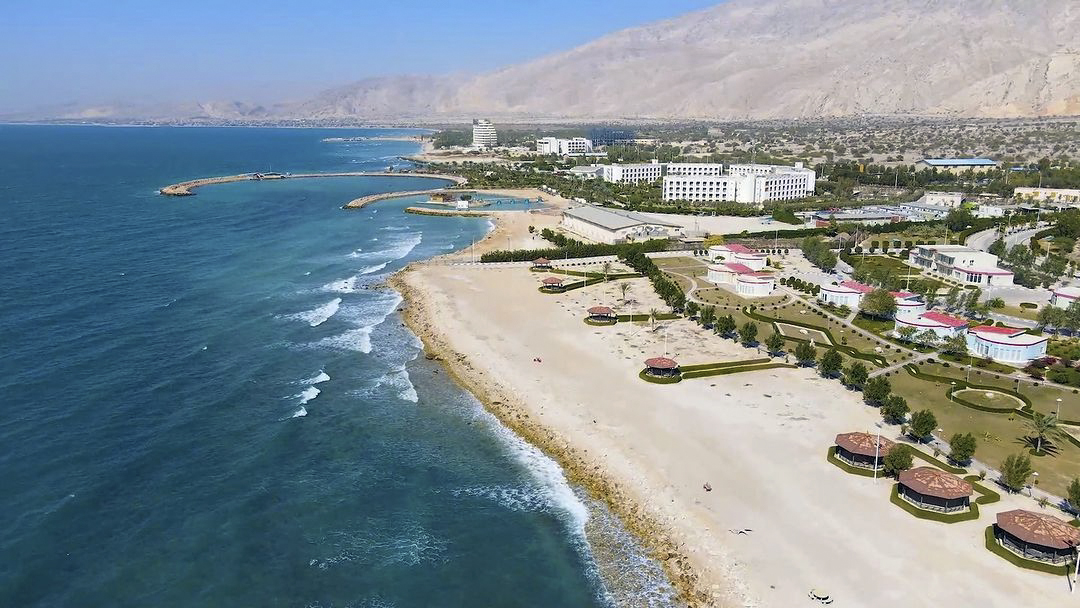

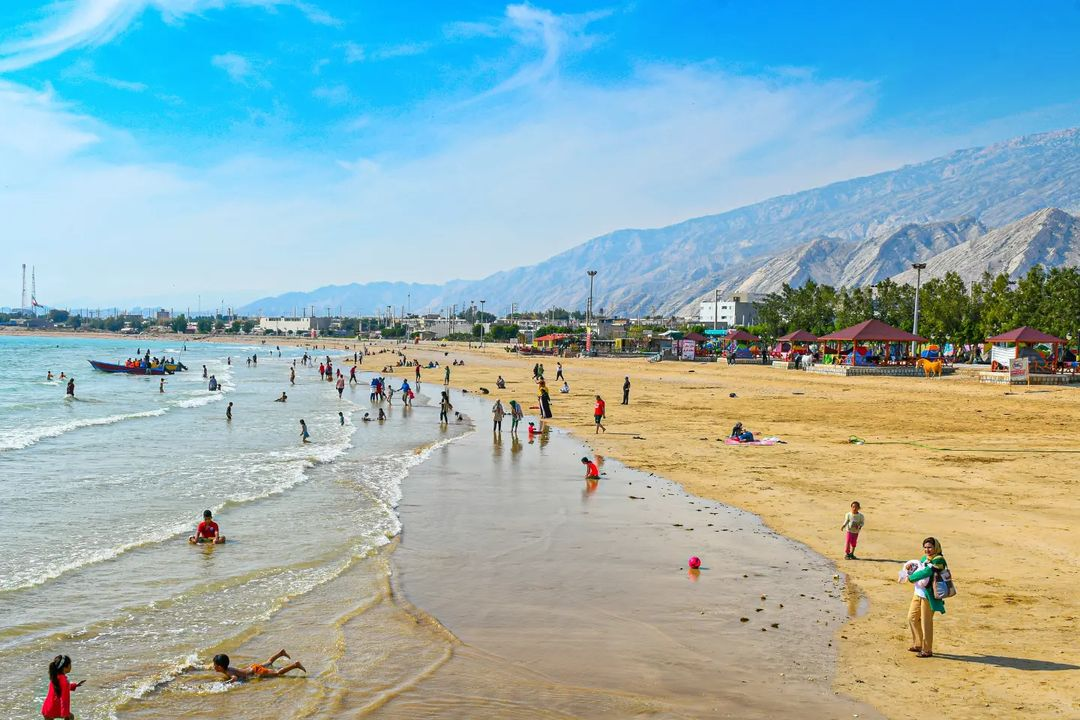

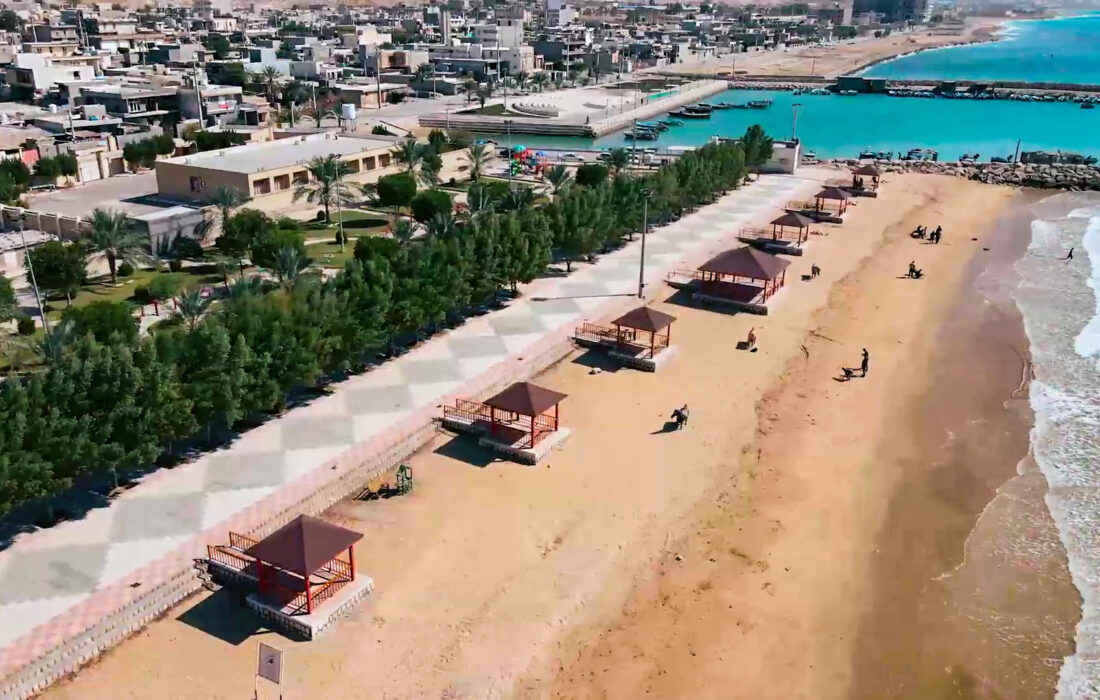

== See also ==
Media related to Bandar-e Shirinu at Wikimedia Commons
