= Posht-e Tang, Bushehr =

Posht-e Tang پشت تنگ
- Village
- Location within Iran
- Coordinates: 34°20′26″N 47°32′21″E
- Country: Iran
- Province: Bushehr
- County: Kangan
- Bakhsh: Central
- Rural District: Taheri

Population (2006)
  - Total: 70
- Time zone: UTC+3:30 (IRST)
  - Summer (DST): UTC+4:30 (IRDT)

Posht-e Tang (Persian: پشت تنگ) is a village in Taheri Rural District, in the Central District of Kangan County, Bushehr Province, Iran. At the 2006 census, its population was 70, in 13 families.
