= Tonbak, Iran =

Village in Bushehr province, Iran

Tonbak Persian: تنبك
- Village
- Location within Iran
- Coordinates: 27°48′15″N 52°05′29″E
- Country: Iran
- Province: Bushehr
- County: Kangan
- District: Central
- Rural District: Howmeh

Population (2016)
  - Total: 824
- Time zone: UTC+3:30 (IRST)

Tonbak (Persian: تنبك) (Note: Also known as Ayāhāt, ‘Ayānāt, Ayhāt, Tombak, and Tumbak) is a village in Howmeh Rural District of the Central District in Kangan County, Bushehr province, Iran.

== Demographics ==
=== Population ===
At the time of the 2006 National Census, the village's population was 286 in 67 households, when it was in Taheri Rural District. The following census in 2011 counted 658 people in 150 households, by which time the village had been transferred to Howmeh Rural District. The 2016 census measured the population of the village as 824 people in 215 households.
