= Gowd =

Gowd may be:

- a common element in Iranian place names; see
  - Gowd, Bushehr, a village in Iran
- an alternative spelling for the Goud and Gaud social groups in India

== See also ==
- M. S. Gowd, Indian dental surgeon
- Goude (disambiguation)
