= Sahmui =

Sahmui (Persian: سهموي), also rendered as Sahmu and Sahmoo, may refer to:

- Sahmui-ye Jonubi
- Sahmui-ye Shomali
