= Chah-e Mobarak Rural District =

Rural district in Bushehr province, Iran

Chah-e Mobarak Rural District Persian: دهستان چاه مبارک
- Rural District
- Location within Iran
- Coordinates: 27°23′N 52°50′E
- Country: Iran
- Province: Bushehr
- County: Asaluyeh
- District: Chah-e Mobarak
- Established: 2013
- Capital: Chah-e Mobarak

Population (2016)
  - Total: 12,078
- Time zone: UTC+3:30 (IRST)

Chah-e Mobarak Rural District (Persian: دهستان چاه مبارک) is in Chah-e Mobarak District of Asaluyeh County, Bushehr province, Iran. It is administered from the city of Chah-e Mobarak.

== History ==
In 2013, Asaluyeh District was separated from Kangan County in the establishment of Asaluyeh County, and Chah-e Mobarak Rural District was created in the new Chah-e Mobarak District.

== Demographics ==
=== Population ===
At the time of the 2016 census, the rural district's population was 12,078 in 2,974 households. The most populous of its 15 villages was Chah-e Mobarak (now a city), with 4,968 people.

=== Other villages in the rural district ===
- Bandu
- Bostanu
- Kheyaru
- Moru
- Savahel
- Sahmui-ye Jonubi
- Sahmui-ye Shomali
- Zaminu
