= Lavardeh =

Village in Bushehr province, Iran

Lavardeh Persian: لاورده
- Village
- Location within Iran
- Coordinates: 27°37′03″N 52°33′06″E
- Country: Iran
- Province: Bushehr
- County: Kangan
- District: Siraf
- Rural District: Shirinu

Population (2016)
  - Total: 297
- Time zone: UTC+3:30 (IRST)

Lavardeh (Persian: لاورده) (Note: Also romanized as Lāvardeh) is a village in, and the capital of Shirinu Rural District in Siraf District of Kangan County, Bushehr province, Iran. The previous capital of the rural district was the village of Bandar-e Shirinu, (Note: Formerly the village of Shirinu) now a city.

== Demographics ==
=== Population ===
At the time of the 2006 National Census, the village's population was 245 in 51 households, when it was in Jam Rural District of the Central District of Jam County. The following census in 2011 counted 257 people in 57 households. The 2016 census measured the population of the village as 297 people in 71 households.

In 2019, the village was separated from the county in the formation of Siraf District in Kangan County and transferred to Shirinu Rural District created in the new district.
