= Nakhl-e Ghanem =

Village in Bushehr province, Iran

Nakhl-e Ghanem Persian: نخل غانم
- Village
- Location within Iran
- Coordinates: 27°48′06″N 52°05′43″E
- Country: Iran
- Province: Bushehr
- County: Kangan
- District: Central
- Rural District: Howmeh

Population (2016)
  - Total: 271
- Time zone: UTC+3:30 (IRST)

Nakhl-e Ghanem (Persian: نخل غانم) (Note: Also romanized as Nakhl Ghānem and Nakhl-e Ghānem; also known as Nakhlawand) is a village in Howmeh Rural District of the Central District in Kangan County, Bushehr province, Iran.

== Demographics ==
=== Population ===
At the time of the 2006 National Census, the village's population was 145 in 37 households. The following census in 2011 counted 183 people in 49 households. The 2016 census measured the population of the village as 271 people in 93 households.
