= Akhand Rural District =

Rural district in Bushehr province, Iran

Akhand Rural District Persian: دهستان اخند
- Rural District
- Location within Iran
- Coordinates: 27°25′N 52°45′E
- Country: Iran
- Province: Bushehr
- County: Asaluyeh
- District: Central
- Established: 2013
- Capital: Akhand

Population (2016)
  - Total: 10,385
- Time zone: UTC+3:30 (IRST)

Akhand Rural District (Persian: دهستان اخند) is in the Central District of Asaluyeh County, Bushehr province, Iran. Its capital is the village of Akhand.

== History ==
In 2013, Asaluyeh District was separated from Kangan County in the establishment of Asaluyeh County, and Akhand Rural District was created in the new Central District.

== Demographics ==
=== Population ===
At the time of the 2016 National Census, the rural district's population was 10,385 in 1,764 households. The most populous of its six villages was Akhand, with 6,775 people.

=== Other villages in the rural district ===
- Askari
- Dehnow
- Gowd-e Akhand
- Kalat
