= Bandu =

Bandu or Bandoo or Bon Dow or Bondow (Persian: بندو) may refer to:

- Bandu, Dashti, Bushehr Province
- Bandu, Kangan, Bushehr Province
- Bandu, a stacking game (similar to Blockhead!) made by Milton-Bradley.
