= Barkeh-ye Chupan =

Village in Bushehr province, Iran

Barkeh-ye Chupan Persian: بركه چوپان
- Village
- Location within Iran
- Coordinates: 27°47′09″N 52°06′58″E
- Country: Iran
- Province: Bushehr
- County: Kangan
- District: Central
- Rural District: Howmeh

Population (2016)
  - Total: 1,235
- Time zone: UTC+3:30 (IRST)

Barkeh-ye Chupan (Persian: بركه چوپان) (Note: Also romanized as Barkeh Chūpān and Barkeh-ye Chūpān; also known as Bargeh Choopan) is a village in Howmeh Rural District of the Central District in Kangan County, Bushehr province, Iran.

== Demographics ==
=== Population ===
At the time of the 2006 National Census, the village's population was 238 in 56 households. The following census in 2011 counted 689 people in 150 households. The 2016 census measured the population of the village as 1,235 people in 223 households. It was the most populous village in its rural district.
