= Bunut =

Bunut may refer to:

- Bunut, Azerbaijan
- Bunut, Bushehr, Iran
- Bunut, Khuzestan, Iran
- Kampong Bunut, village in Brunei
