= Chah-e Mobarak =

City in Bushehr province, Iran

Chah-e Mobarak Persian: چاه مبارک
- City
- Location within Iran
- Coordinates: 27°21′58″N 52°47′21″E
- Country: Iran
- Province: Bushehr
- County: Asaluyeh
- District: Chah-e Mobarak
- Established as a city: 2018

Population (2016)
  - Total: 4,968
- Time zone: UTC+3:30 (IRST)

Chah-e Mobarak (Persian: چاه مبارک) is a city in, and the capital of, Chah-e Mobarak District in Asaluyeh County, Bushehr province, Iran. It also serves as the administrative center for Chah-e Mobarak Rural District. As a village, Chah-e Mobarak was the capital of Nayband Rural District until its capital was transferred to the village of Zobar.

== Demographics ==
=== Population ===
At the time of the 2006 National Census, Chah-e Mobarak's population was 2,343 in 385 households, when it was a village in Nayband Rural District of the former Asaluyeh District in Kangan County. The following census in 2011 counted 3,348 people in 773 households. The 2016 census measured the population of the village as 4,968 people in 1,225 households, by which time the district had been separated from the county in the establishment of Asaluyeh County. The rural district was transferred to the new Chah-e Mobarak District, and the village was transferred to Chah-e Mobarak Rural District created in the district. It was the most populous village in its rural district.

Chah-e Mobarak was converted to a city 2018.
