= Bid Khun =

City in Bushehr province, Iran

Bid Khun Persian: بيدخون
- City
- Location within Iran
- Coordinates: 27°28′49″N 52°40′05″E
- Country: Iran
- Province: Bushehr
- County: Asaluyeh
- District: Central
- Established as a city: 2019

Population (2016)
  - Total: 8,886
- Time zone: UTC+3:30 (IRST)

Bid Khun (Persian: بيدخون) (Note: Also romanized as Bid Khoon and Bīd Khūn; also known as Bīdakhun) is a city in the Central District of Asaluyeh County, Bushehr province, Iran.

== Demographics ==
=== Population ===
At the time of the 2006 National Census, Bid Khun's population was 1,890 in 461 households, when it was a village in Asaluyeh Rural District of the former Asaluyeh District in Kangan County. The following census in 2011 counted 5,269 people in 1,305 households. The 2016 census measured the population of the village as 8,886 people in 2,071 households, by which time the district had been separated from the county in the establishment of Asaluyeh County. The rural district was transferred to the new Central District. It was the most populous village in its rural district.

Bid Khun was converted to a city in 2019.
