= Parak, Bushehr =

Village in Bushehr province, Iran

Parak Persian: پرک
- Village
- Location within Iran
- Coordinates: 27°39′13″N 52°24′58″E
- Country: Iran
- Province: Bushehr
- County: Kangan
- District: Siraf
- Rural District: Taheri

Population (2016)
  - Total: 3,582
- Time zone: UTC+3:30 (IRST)

Parak (Persian: پرک) (Note: Also known as Barak) is a village in, and the capital of, Taheri Rural District in Siraf District of Kangan County, Bushehr province, Iran. The previous capital of the rural district was the village of Taheri, now the city of Bandar Siraf.

== Demographics ==
=== Population ===
At the time of the 2006 National Census, the village's population was 2,088 in 405 households, when it was in the Central District. The following census in 2011 counted 2,955 people in 707 households. The 2016 census measured the population of the village as 3,582 people in 885 households.

In 2019, the rural district was separated from the district in the formation of Siraf District.
