= Bandar Siraf =

City in Bushehr province, Iran

Bandar-e Siraf Persian: بندر سیراف
- City
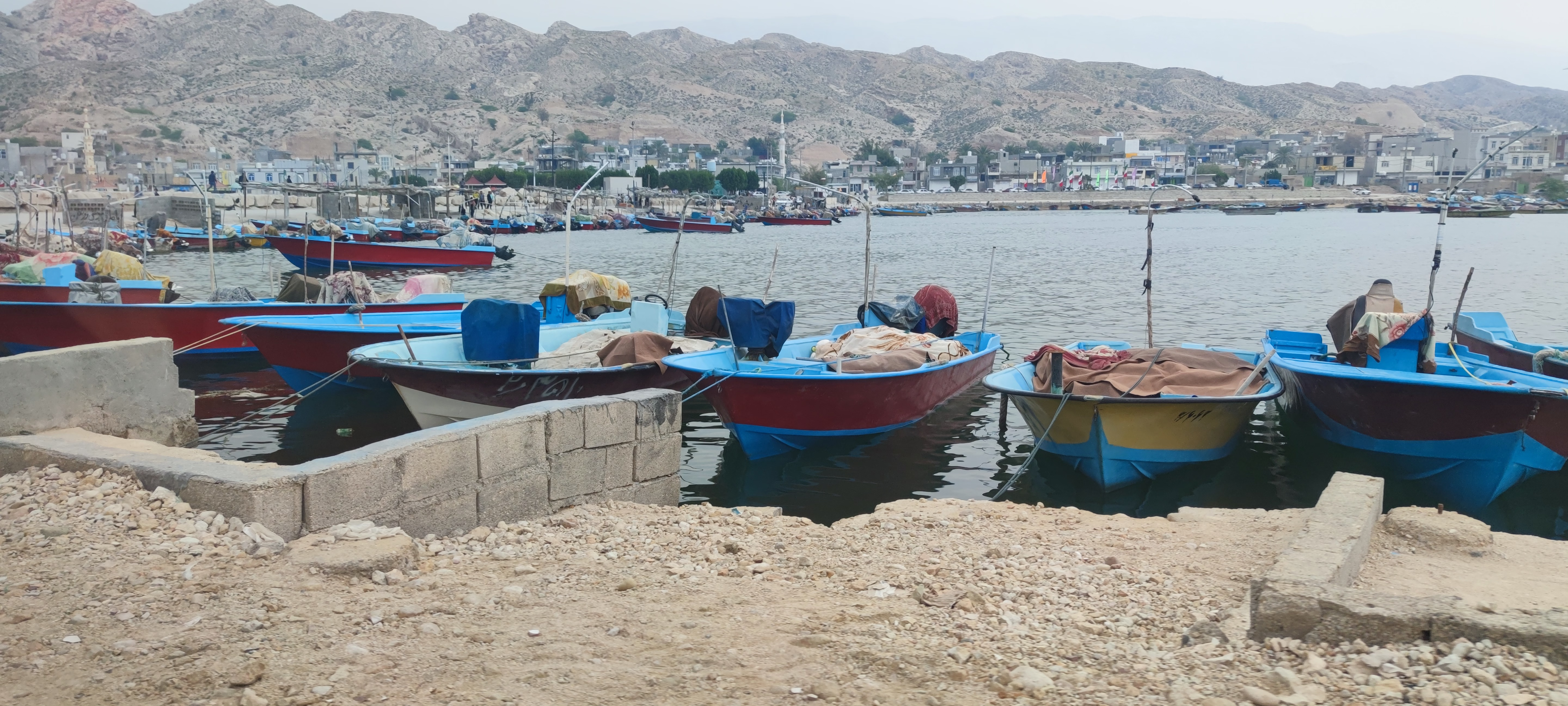
- Beachfront in Siraf

- Location within Iran
- Coordinates: 27°39′54″N 52°20′48″E
- Country: Iran
- Province: Bushehr
- County: Kangan
- District: Siraf
- Established as a city: 2005

Population (2016)
  - Total: 6,992
- Time zone: UTC+3:30 (IRST)

Bandar Siraf (Persian: بندر سیراف) (Note: Also romanized as Bandar-e Sīraf; also known as Sīraf; formerly Taheri (طاهری); also romanized as Ṭāherī; also known as Bandar-e Ṭāherī (بندر طاهری), Bandar-i Ṭāhirī, and Tāhiri) is a city in, and the capital of, Siraf District in Kangan County, Bushehr province, Iran. As the village of Taheri, it was the capital of Taheri Rural District until its capital was transferred to the village of Parak. Taheri was converted to a city in 2005.

According to legend, Siraf was an ancient Sasanian port, destroyed around 970 CE, which was located on the north shore of the Persian Gulf in what is now the Iranian province of Bushehr. Its ruins are approximately 220 km east of the city of Bushehr, 30 km east from Kangan city, and 380 km west of Bandar Abbas. Siraf controlled three ports: Bandar-e-Taheri, Bandar-e Kangan and Bandar-e Dayyer. The Persian Gulf was used as a shipping route between the Arabian Peninsula and India over the Arabian Sea. Small boats, such as dhows, could also make the long journey by staying close to the coast and keeping land in sight.

The port was known as Taheri or Tahiri until in 2008 the government of Iran changed the official name of the city back to Bandar Siraf.

== History ==
The port was known as Siraf in ancient times. At the time of the Silk Road, most of the commerce towards Asia was performed through Siraf. Several episodes of massive earthquakes and tsunamis damaged and drowned much of the port city, where its ancient quays, moorages, administrative structures, and even boat remains are found today on the sea floor of the Persian Gulf via marine archaeology.

=== Sasanian era ===
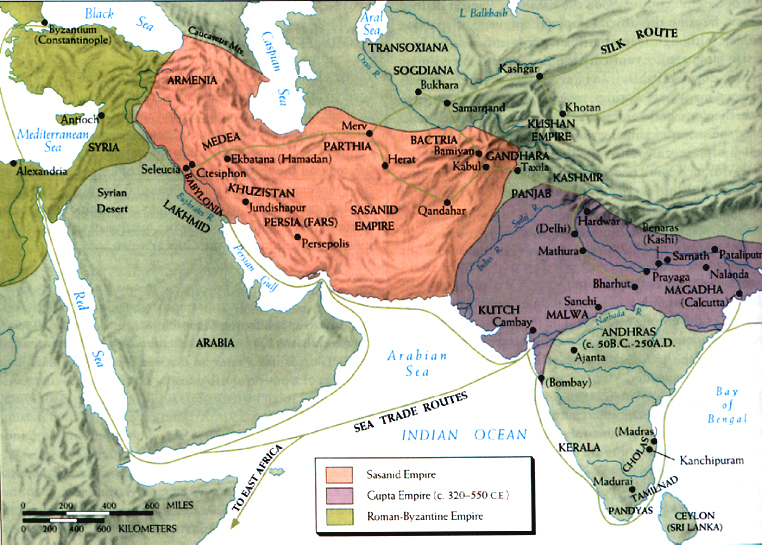
Sea routes during the Sasanian era

The historical importance of Siraf to ancient trade is only now being realized. Discovered there in past archaeological excavations are ivory objects from East Africa, pieces of stone from India, and lapis lazuli from Afghanistan. Siraf dates back to the Parthian era.

According to David Whitehouse, one of the first archaeologists to excavate the ancient ruins of Siraf, marine trade between the Persian Gulf and Far East lands began to flourish at this port because of the vast expansion of trade in consumer goods and luxury items in ancient times. According to legend, the first contact between Siraf and China occurred in 741 AD. However, when sea trade routes tried shifting to the Red Sea, Siraf lost some business.

Excavations at Siraf have uncovered evidence of a Sasanian port, which probably served the inland city of Gor (now Firuzabad). There was also a huge castle, possibly built c. 360 by Shapur II.

There is historical evidence of Sasanian maritime trade with the Gulf of Cambay in the modern day province of Gujarat, as fragments of Indian red polished ware, of predominantly Gujarati provenance dating to the 5th and 6th centuries were found at coastal sites on the northern shores of the Persian Gulf, and especially at Siraf.

=== Islamic era ===
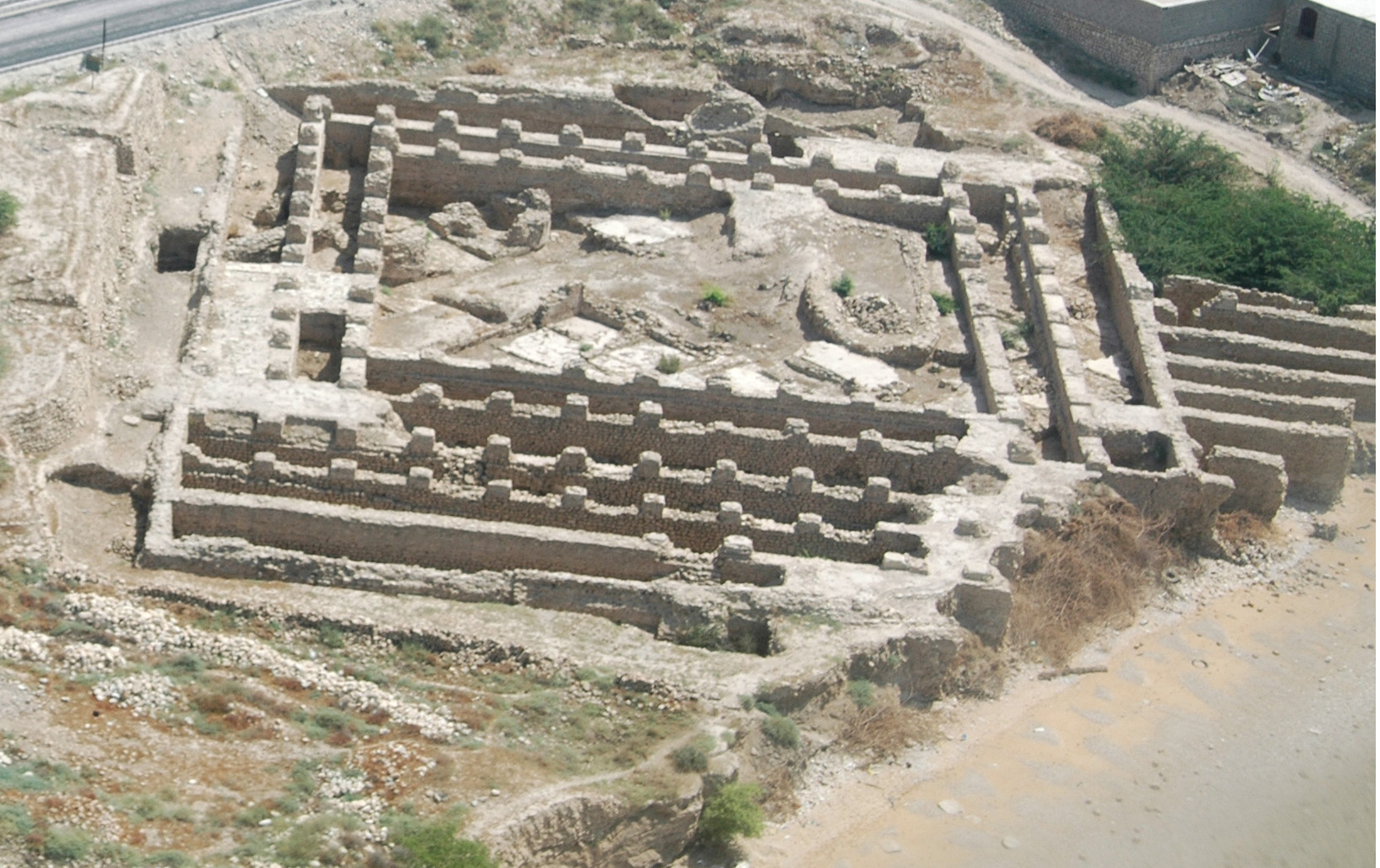
The jameh mosque of Siraf, begun in the 9th century

In the 9th century, Siraf was revamped and expanded exponentially as the sea trade with Asia flourished. The city's congregational mosque, one of the earliest in Iran, was among the items studied by Whitehouse. The mosque was "a huge rectangular structure with a central courtyard set on a raised podium", with a single entrance on the east side (opposite from the qibla). The mosque was built in two phases. The first was in the first half of the 9th century and the second was around 850. There were also several smaller mosques, all with mihrabs projecting onto the outside of the building. There are ruins of the luxurious houses of extremely rich traders who made their wealth through the port's success.

The earliest Muslim writer to mention Siraf is Ibn al-Faqih, who wrote around 850 that Sirafi ships traded with India. Around the same time, Sulaiman al-Tajir wrote that Middle Eastern goods bound for China were first shipped from Basra to Siraf, then on to Muscat in Oman and Kollam in India. Around 900, Abu Zayd Hasan - himself a merchant from Siraf - wrote that Sirafi ships were engaged in commerce with both Jeddah on the Red Sea and Zanzibar in East Africa. Abu Zayd also wrote that trade between the Persian Gulf and China had decreased after the Guangzhou massacre in 878 killed many foreign merchants, although Chinese coins were still circulating in Siraf at the time he was writing. Later, when Al-Masudi visited Madagascar between 916 and 926, he noted that Sirafi ships were present there, along with ships from Oman.

During its heyday, Siraf was the largest and wealthiest port city on the Iranian side of the Persian Gulf. It was a center of commerce with Africa, India, and China. The anonymous author of the 10th-century Hudud al-'Alam called Siraf "the merchants' haunt and the emporium of Fars". The later author Ibn al-Balkhi wrote of the period from 908 to 932, the annual value of goods traded in Siraf was 2.53 million dinars. The most detailed account of Siraf comes from Istakhri, shortly before 950. He described it as the second-largest city in the district of Ardashir-Khwarrah (southwestern Fars), behind only Shiraz - which it rivaled in size. He listed some of the goods that were traded here: ebony, ivory, sandalwood and other aromatics, bamboo, spices, paper, aloe, camphor, ambergris, and precious stones. Among the goods manufactured in Siraf itself were linen napkins and veils. Siraf was also an important market for pearls - nearby Ganaveh was renowned for its pearl fishing industry. Merchants and ship captains from Siraf amassed huge fortunes off all this maritime trade, and they lived in "richly decorated, multi-story houses" built from teak wood, imported from East Africa, and fired brick. According to contemporary accounts, a merchant might spend 30,000 dinars on one of these houses. The "rather puritanical" 10th-century author al-Maqdisi regarded Siraf as a nest of corruption and wrote that adultery, usury, and general extravagance were rampant here. When an earthquake in 977 caused serious damage to Siraf, al-Maqdisi viewed it as "a fitting punishment from God".

Siraf served an international clientele of merchants including those from South India ruled by the Western Chalukyas dynasty who were feasted by wealthy local merchants during business visits. An indicator of the Indian merchants' importance in Siraf comes from records describing dining plates reserved for them.

However, Siraf lacked drinking water (apart from one small qanat, according to al-Maqdisi) and good farmland, so food and water had to be imported from the Jam plain.

According to al-Maqdisi, Siraf's decline began with the Buyid dynasty gaining power in Fars; many Sirafis relocated to Oman at this point according to him. On the other hand, Ibn al-Balkhi says nothing about such a migration and instead attributes the town's decline to the period after the fall of the Buyids in 1055. Pirates from the nearby Qays Island then took advantage of the resulting power vacuum to attack Sirafi ships with impunity. Commercial traffic on the Persian Gulf started to bypass Siraf altogether and instead go straight to Basra.

Siraf was not the only Gulf port to decline around this time. Ganaveh, Tawwaz, Siniz, and Mahruban all declined at about the same time. However, this decline "can only have been relative" - in the early 12th century, the wealthy ship-owner and merchant tycoon Abu'l-Qasim Ramisht (died 1140) is known to have operated a prosperous commercial enterprise based out of Siraf that did business as far as China. In the 12th century, a Jat chief named Abu al-Qasim controlled Siraf and surrounding districts. By the 13th century, though, Yaqut al-Hamawi left a less than sanguine description of Siraf - he called it a small place (bulayd) inhabited by "wretched people", with its buildings in ruins. By this point, the name Siraf had become distorted to Shīlāw. This name is still used to refer to a small valley south of the site's main ridge (see above).

Yaqut may have painted a rather bleak picture of Siraf, but its role as a commercial port was far from over. It remained a regional trade center on a smaller scale until the 15th or 16th century. It served as the port for the Khunj u Fal region, as a point of departure for Qatif and the Arabian Peninsula. Ibn Battuta knew of "Shilaw" and may have visited in 1347 when he crossed the Persian Gulf from "Khunju Pal" over to the Arabian Peninsula. Shilaw was also mentioned by 16th-century European travelers, such as António Tenreiro, who visited "Chilaão" in 1528, and Gasparo Balbi, who visited "Silaú" in 1590. After that, however, sources only describe a very small and basic harbor at the modern village of Taheri.

In 1812, James Morier wrote about the existence of ruins at Taheri. Someone named Brucks then visited the site but thought it was Portuguese. The British naval officer G.N. Kempthorne later visited the site in 1835 and was the first to identify the ruins with Siraf. In 1933, Aurel Stein visited Siraf and left a description of a massive "sea wall", which extended for some 400 m along the beach and was reinforced with buttresses but has since disappeared.

Many of the finds (over 16,000 in all) excavated at Siraf by Whitehouse and his archaeological team in the 1960s and 1970s are kept in the British Museum in London.

Siraf has not yet been registered on the list of national heritage sites of Iran. This is needed so that it will be preserved and maintained in the future.

== Demographics ==
=== Population ===
At the time of the 2006 National Census, the city's population was 3,500 in 722 households, when it was in the Central District. The following census in 2011 counted 7,137 people in 1,309 households. The 2016 census measured the population of the city as 6,992 people in 1,949 households.

In 2019, the city was separated from the district in the formation of Siraf District.

== Geography ==
The site of Siraf is located by a shallow bay that extends for 4 km east–west. Just 500 m inland is a sandstone ridge running parallel to the coast. Siraf itself is located in the narrow habitable strip between the beach and the ridge. In this part of Fars, many long ridges like this one run parallel to the coast, rising as high as 1500 m within 20 km from the sea. Passes through the ridges are only found occasionally, making communication with the interior difficult.

The narrow coastal plain is divided in two by a spur jutting out from the ridge. The core of the modern settlement of Taheri is on the east side of this spur, while the ruins of historical Siraf are to the west, extending for 2 km along the seashore. On the spur itself was the fortified residence of the local shaikh. To the west is the dry wadi bed called Kunarak, which marks the western boundary of old Siraf. Today, the Kunarak valley is where the main road passes through to connect Taheri with the Jam plain further inland, and the same was probably true in historical times when Siraf was at its peak. To the west of the Kunarak valley is the Bagh-i-Shaikh plain. The coastal plain gradually widens toward the west, and the Bagh-i-Shaikh plain is 1 km across.

Besides the Kunarak valley, there is a second gap in the main ridge known as the Tang-i-Lir. This is a narrow gorge located about 1.5 km east of the Kunarak pass. Besides the main spur that divides the coastal plain, there are two smaller spurs between the two gaps. The first and larger one runs almost parallel with the main ridge for about 1 km west of the Tang-i-Lir. Between it and the main ridge is the Shilaw valley, which retains the old variant of the name attested since the 13th century. The northern slopes of the Shilaw valley are covered in rock-cut graves, which are now empty. A second small spur is between the Shilaw valley and the Kunarak wadi.

== Gallery ==
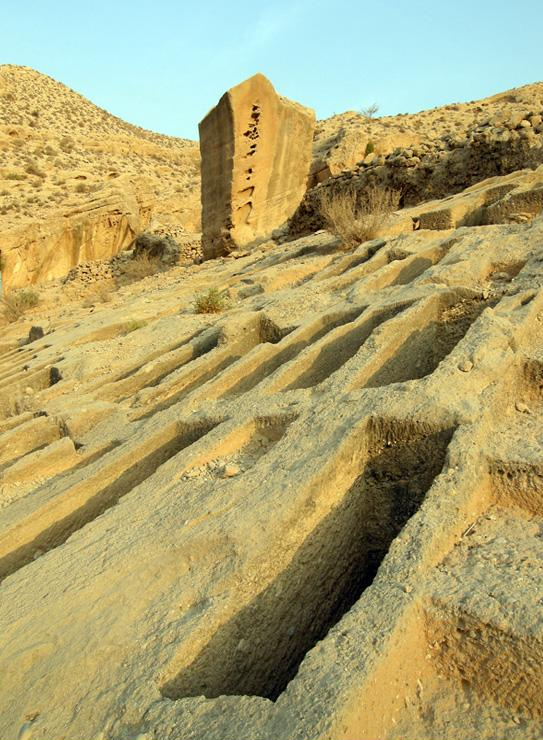
Rock-cut graves in the Shilaw valley

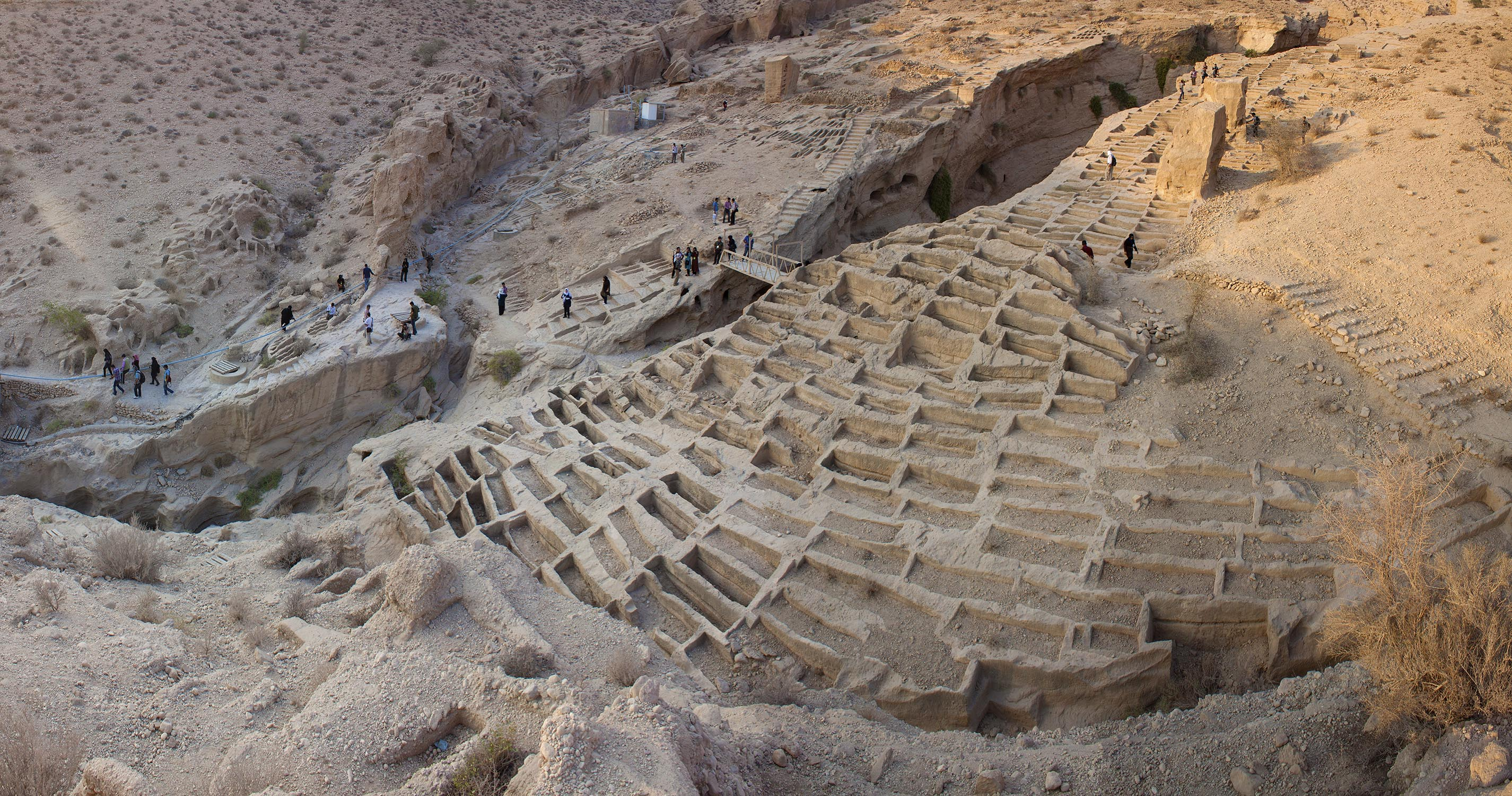
Rock-cut graves in the Shilaw valley

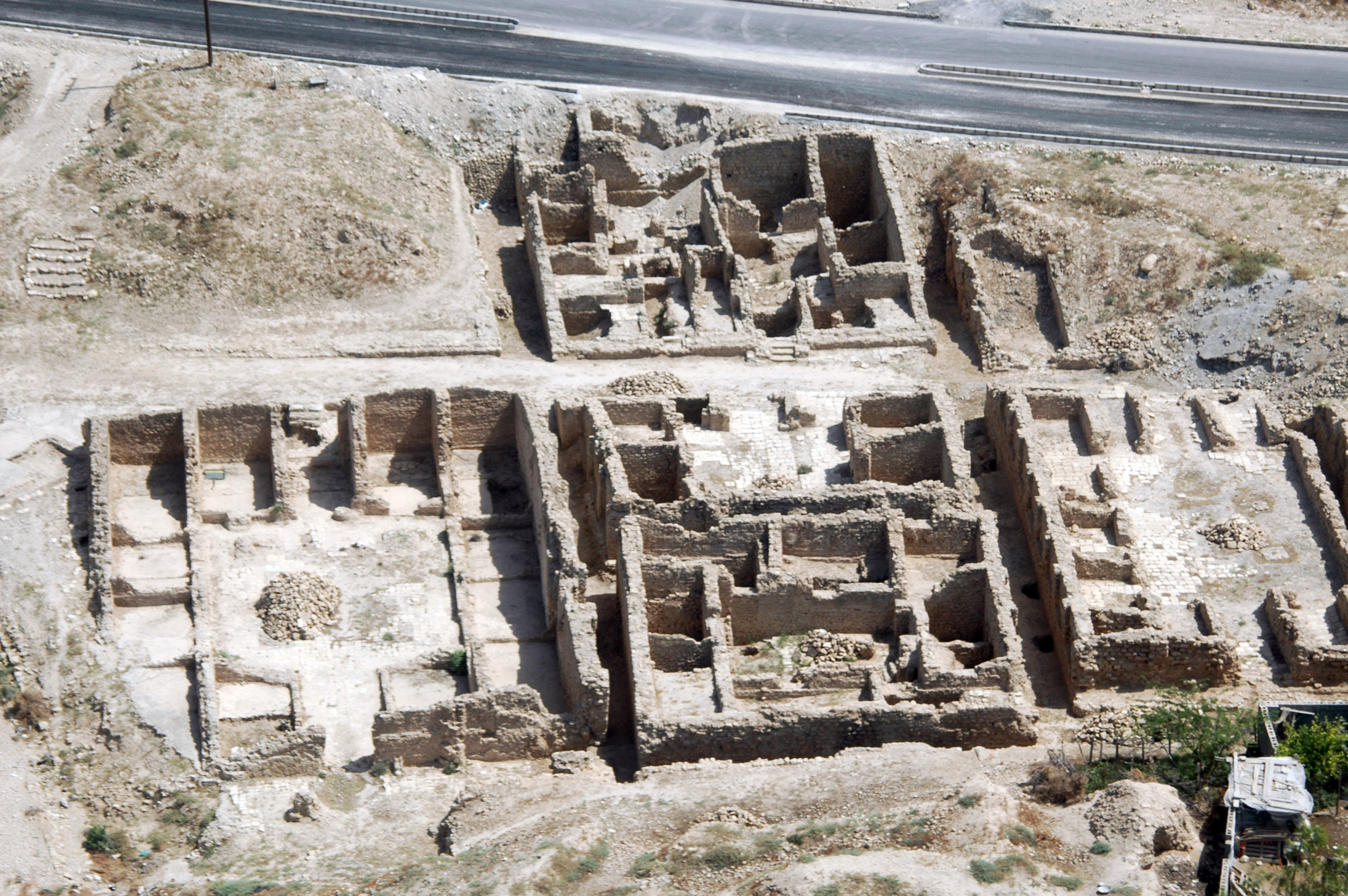
Ruins of buildings at Siraf

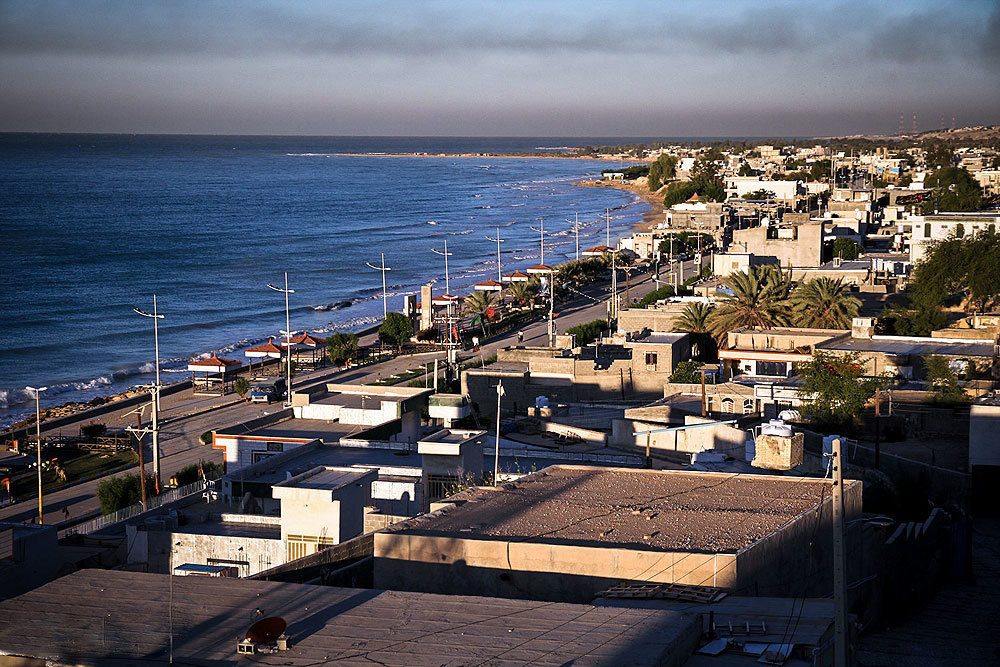
Siraf skyline

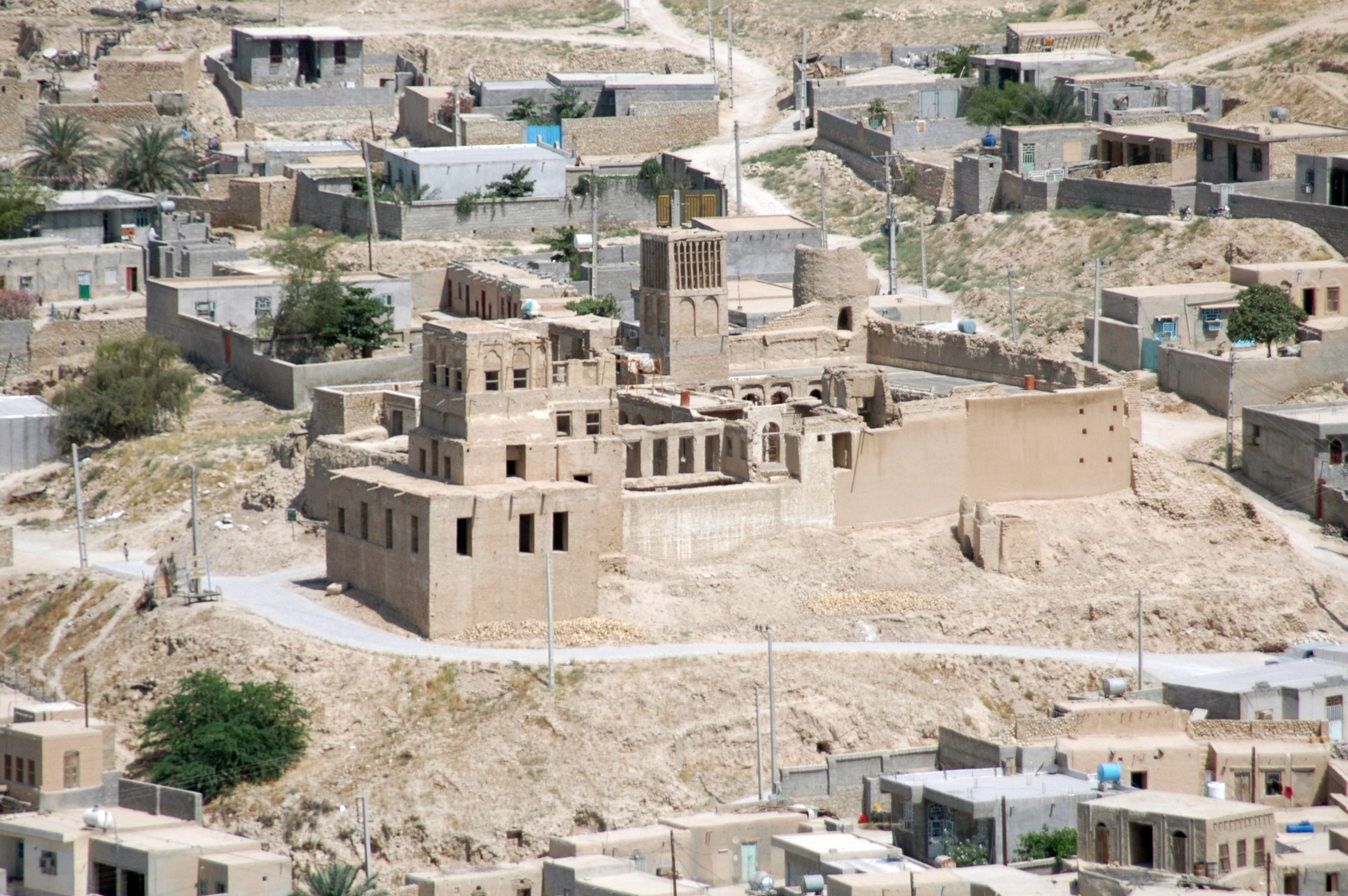
Nasori Castle, former residence of the local shaikhs

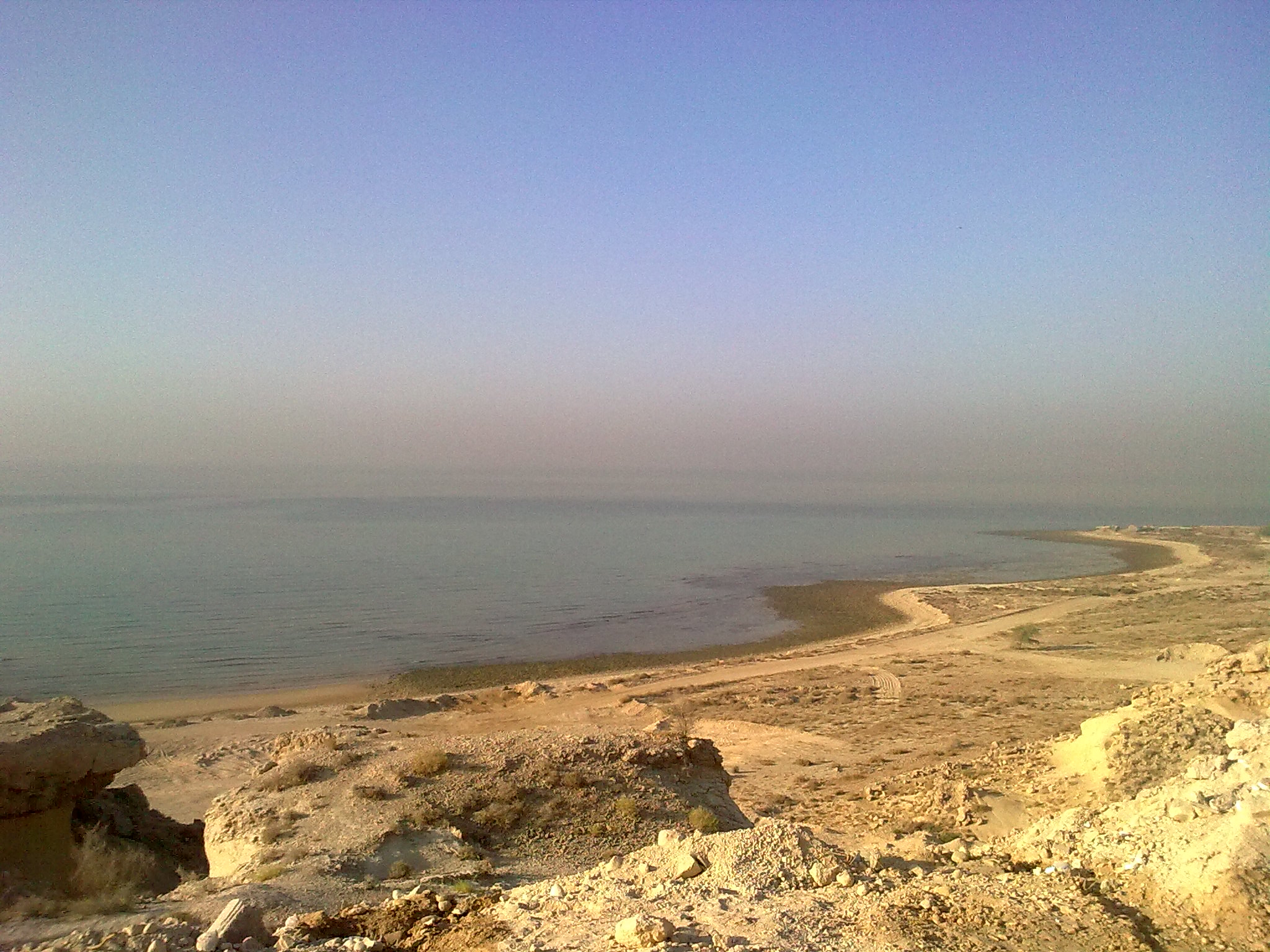
Beach near Siraf

== See also ==
Media related to Bandar Siraf at Wikimedia Commons
