= Moru =

Moru may refer to:

- Moru people, an ethnic group of South Sudan
  - Moru language
- Moru, Iran, a village in Bushehr Province
- Moru, Kerman, a village in Kerman Province, Iran
- Moru, Ribadesella a parish of Ribadesella, Asturias, Spain
