= Nasori Castle =

Castle in Bushehr Province, Iran

Nasori castle
- قلعه نصوری
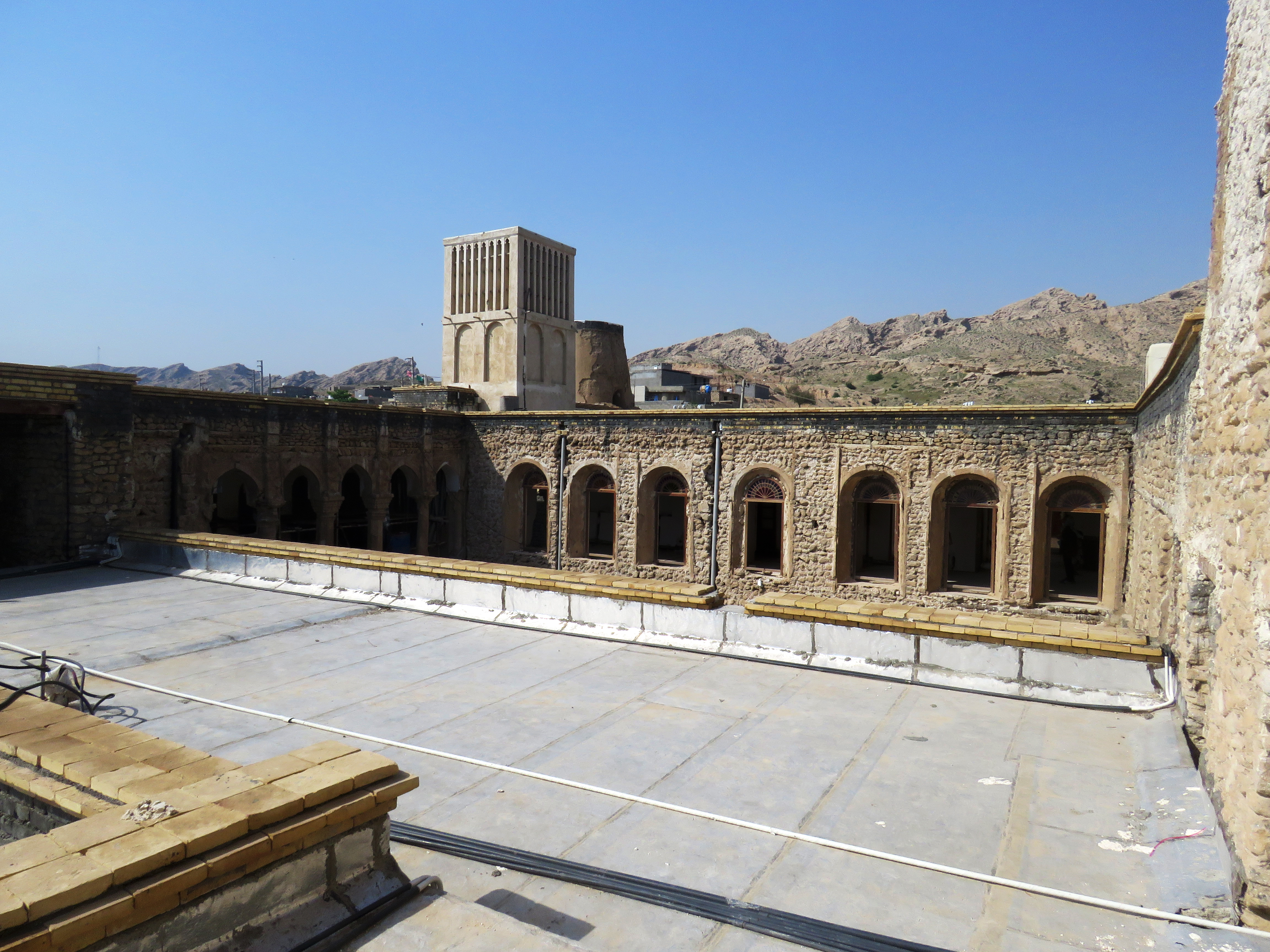
- Interactive map of the Nasori castle area

General information
- Type: Castle
- Location: Kangan County, Iran
- Coordinates: 27.66641°N 52.34332°E

Nasori castle (Persian: قلعه نصوری) is a historical castle located in Kangan County in Bushehr Province, The longevity of this fortress dates back to the Qajar dynasty.
