= Mizab al-Rahma =

Rain spout of the Kaaba

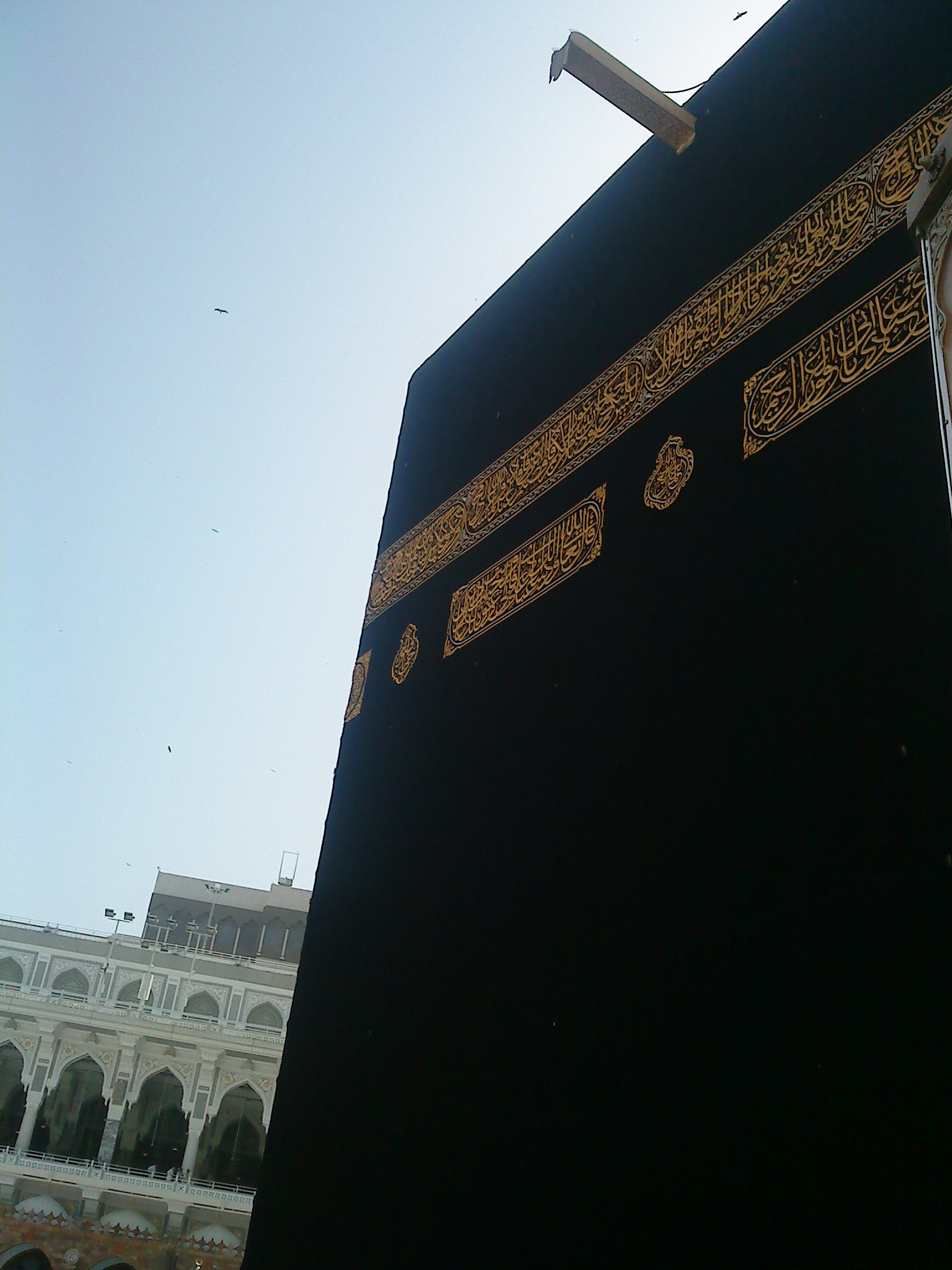
Mīzab al-Raḥma

The Mīzāb al-Raḥma (Arabic: مِيزَاب الرَّحْمة, 'Spout of mercy'), also known as the Mīzāb al-Kaaba ('Spout of the Kaaba'), is a rain spout projecting from the roof of the Kaaba enabling rainwater to pour to the ground below.

== Architecture ==
The roof of the Kaʿba is flat, but slopes gently down to the north-west face. From this corner, the mīzāb juts out, conducting rainwater from the roof. The lip of the mīzāb has an appendage known as the "beard of the mīzāb". The ground below is paved with marble slabs and decorated with inlaid mosaic designs. The design of the mīzāb has changed over the years; the current form is golden. Its length is 258 cm (8.46 ft), which is included in the wall of the Kaaba, its cavity width is 26 cm (10 in), the height of each side is 23 cm (9.1 in), and its entry into the roof wall is 58 cm (1.90 ft).

A detailed description of the mīzāb around 1183–85 CE is offered by Ibn Jubayr:

The Mizab is on the top of the wall which overlooks the Hijr. It is of gilded copper and projects four cubits over the Hijr, its breadth being a span. This place under the waterspout is also considered as being a place where, by the favour of God Most High, prayers are answered. The Yemen corner is the same. The wall connecting this place with the Syrian corner is called al-Mustajar [The Place of Refuge]. Underneath the water-spout, and in the court of the Hijr near to the wall of the blessed House, is the tomb of Isma'il [Ishmael] - may God bless and preserve him. Its mark is a slab of green marble, almost oblong and in the form of a mihrab. Beside it is a round green slab of marble, and both [they are verde antico] are remarkable to look upon.

== Role in worship ==
In his Kitāb Akhbār Makka, the ninth-century scholar al-Azraqī wrote with reference to the mīzāb that "anyone who performs the ṣalāt under the mat̲h̲ʿab becomes as pure as on the day when his mother bore him".

Ibn Jubayr offers a vivid account of worship at the mīzāb in 1183 CE:

One of the things that deserve to be confirmed and recorded for the blessings and favour of seeing and observing it is that on Friday the 19th of Jumada l-Ula, which was the 9th of September [1183], God raised from the sea a cloud which moved towards Damascus and rained heavily like an abundant fountain, according to the words of the Messenger of God--may God bless and preserve him. It came at the ending of the afternoon's prayers and with the evening of the same day, raining copiously. Men hastened to the Hijr and stood beneath the blessed water-spout, stripping off their clothes and meeting the water that flowed from it with their heads, their hands, and their mouths. They pressed round it in a throng, raising a great clamour, each one coveting for his body a share of the divine mercy. Their prayers went up, the tears of the contrite flowed, and you could hear nothing but the swell of voices in prayer and the sobs of the weeping. The women stood without the Hijr, watching with weeping eyes and humble hearts, wishing they could go to that spot. Some pilgrims listful of performing a meritorious act, and moved as well to pity, drenched their clothes in the blessed water and, going out to the women, wrung them into the hands of some of them. They took it and drank it and laved it over their faces and bodies.

== History ==
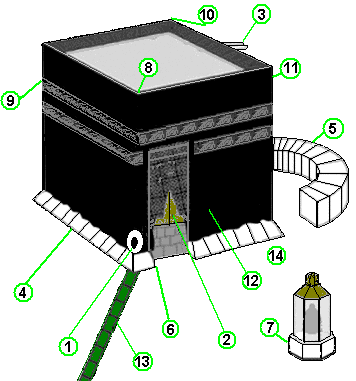
Mīzab al-Raḥma (3)

- The first Mīzāb that worked for the Kaʿba was that the Quraish made when building it before the Prophetic mission.
- Then the Mīzāb of Abd Allah ibn al-Zubayr when he built the Kaʿba in 684 AD.
- Then the Mīzāb of Al-Hajjaj ibn Yusuf, who rebuilt the Kaʿba in 692 AD.
- Then the Mīzāb of Sheikh Abu al-Qasim Ramesht, which his slave reached after his death in 1142 AD.
- Then the Mīzāb of Al-Muqtafi in 1146 AD.
- Then the Mīzāb of Al-Nasir in 1279 AD.
- Then the Mīzāb of Suleiman the Magnificent in 1551 AD.
- Then the Mīzāb which was made from Egypt in 1554 AD.
- Then the Mīzāb of The Ottoman Sultan Ahmed I Ibn Muhammad III in 1612 AD.
- Then the Mīzāb of The Sultan Abdulmejid I in 1856 AD.
- Then the Mīzāb, which was sent with Haji Rida Pasha in 1859 AD.
- Then the Mīzāb of the reign of King Fahd bin Abdulaziz in 1997, when he replaced the old Mīzāb for the roof of the Ka'aba with a new one, stronger with the same specifications as the old one.
