= Ramisht of Siraf =

Muslim merchant

Rāmisht of Sīrāf was a prominent 12th-century Muslim merchant from Siraf in Bushehr Province, Iran. He died in Sha'ban, 534 AH, or March/April 1140 CE. One of the wealthiest merchants of his time and place, Rāmisht was known for financing various constructions in and around the sanctuary in Mecca. He was a shipowner whose commercial activities spanned the Indian Ocean from Yemen to India.

== Name and ancestry ==
A basalt plate near the Bāb al-Wadā' ("gate of farewell") in Mecca, dedicated in Ramadan, 529 AH (June/July 1135) records Rāmisht's full name as Abu'l-Qāsim Rāmisht ibn al-Ḥusayn ibn Shīrawayhi ibn al-Ḥusayn ibn Ja‘far. The same form is listed on his tombstone. A slightly different version of his name is given by the 14th-century chronicler Taqi al-Din al-Fasi, who refers to him in one passage as "Rāmisht, i.e. the elder Abu'l-Qāsim Ibrāhīm ibn al-Ḥusayn".

== Sources and business activities ==
An anonymous 12th-century abridger of Ibn Hawqal's added a note saying that he had met Rāmisht's youngest son, Mūsā, in Aden in 539 AH (about five years after Rāmisht himself died); this anonymous author wrote about Rāmisht's vast wealth, saying "I have heard of no merchant in our time who has equalled Rāmisht in wealth or prestige." Rāmisht is also mentioned by several chroniclers; his name is also mentioned in various business letters that have survived, and a transcription of his tombstone in Mecca has also been preserved (although the grave itself has not been found).

Rāmisht's tomb inscription mentions him as a ship owner (nā-khudā), and Ibn al-Athir mentions that he was "one of the merchants who went to India and was very rich."

Rāmisht also appears in several documents archived in the Cairo Geniza. For example, one letter from a Jewish merchant in Aden in Yemen wrote in 1135 that two of Rāmisht's ships had evaded an invasion by the ruler of Kish Island and reached port safely.

== Endowments in Mecca ==
Rāmisht donated a golden water spout to serve as the Mizab al-Rahma on the Ka'ba, replacing an earlier one which had been made of silver. This only arrived in 537 AH, three years after his death; it was brought at the same time as his coffin was brought to Mecca for burial. Rāmisht's spout only lasted a few years; it was replaced in either 541 or 542 by a new one donated by the caliph al-Muqtafi.

Another of Rāmisht's donations to the Ka'ba was the kiswah, the cloth covering the Ka'ba. This happened after the kiswah was torn in 532 AH, or 1137-38 CE (during what Ibn al-Athir referred to as a "dissension mentioned above", although he apparently didn't mention this event beforehand). According to Ibn al-Athir, this cost Rāmisht 18,000 Fatimid dinars; according to an unidentified source used by al-Fasi, this cost 4,000 dinars instead. It's not clear which number is correct, but it's possible that they're both correct – al-Fasi refers to Rāmisht's kiswah as being made of "striped cloth and other material", and the "other material" may account for the discrepancy between the two numbers.

Rāmisht was also known in Mecca as the founder of a ribat, a hospice for Sufis. This was located by the Ḥazwara Gate, on the southwest side of the Mecca sanctuary; the gate is now known as the Bāb al-Wadā' ("gate of farewell") because pilgrims pass through here when exiting the sanctuary. A basalt plate near the gate, dedicated in Ramadan, 529 AH (June/July 1135), has survived into modern times; the inscription on this plate is actually an excerpt from the full waqfiyyah (official endowment deed) for the ribat. It says that Rāmisht had endowed the ribat for any male Sufis from Iraq, "as well as other pilgrims and inhabitants of the holy city". The ribat of Rāmisht gained notoriety because the Mecca fire of 1400 started in one of its rooms; the fire ended up burning down a large part of the sanctuary. From the account of this fire, it appears that the ribat had a door opening directly onto the sanctuary. The ribat was later renovated in 818 AH by the sharif of Mecca, Ḥasan ibn 'Ajlān. By the mid-1500s, the ribat was no longer named after Rāmisht – in Ibn Zuhayra's history of Mecca, which he finished in 1553, he refers to it as being named after someone known as the Inspector of the Private Domain.

Another contribution from Rāmisht in Mecca, according to the 12th century traveller Ibn Jubayr, was that he paid for the construction of "the place of the Hanbalite Imam of the sanctuary".<-- Stern, p. 13-4 --> What denomination of Islam Rāmisht personally followed (e.g. Sunni or Shi'i) is unknown; the waqfiyyah for his ribat calls Rāmisht "the pride of the two communities", but what specifically these religious communities were is unclear.
