= Tombak Rural District =

Rural district in Bushehr province, Iran

Tombak Rural District Persian: دهستان تمبک
- Rural District
- Location within Iran
- Coordinates: 27°46′54″N 52°10′15″E
- Country: Iran
- Province: Bushehr
- County: Kangan
- District: Central
- Established: 2019
- Capital: Qaleh-ye Meyan
- Time zone: UTC+3:30 (IRST)

Tombak Rural District (Persian: دهستان تمبک) is in the Central District of Kangan County, Bushehr province, Iran. Its capital is the village of Qaleh-ye Meyan, whose population at the time of the 2016 National Census was 928 people in 250 households.

== History ==
Tombak Rural District was created in the Central District in 2019.
