= Goude =

Goude or Goudé may refer to:

== Goude ==
- Alex Goude (born 1975), French journalist, television host, author, and actor
- Ingrid Goude (born 1937), Swedish model and film actress
- Jane Goude (1891–1966), American actress, Chautauqua performer, and clubwoman
- Jean-Paul Goude (born 1940), French graphic designer, illustrator, photographer, and advertising film director
- Jean-Philippe Goude (born 1952), French composer and keyboardist

== Goudé ==
- Charles Blé Goudé (born 1972), Ivorian politician, later charged with war crimes
- Narcisse "Goudé" Sadoua, or just Goudé, musician, member of band Magic System

== See also ==
- Goud
- Gowd (disambiguation)
