= Bank, Iran =

City in Bushehr province, Iran

Bank Persian: بنک
- City
- Location within Iran
- Coordinates: 27°52′17″N 52°01′38″E
- Country: Iran
- Province: Bushehr
- County: Kangan
- District: Central
- Established: 2003

Population (2016)
  - Total: 14,126
- Time zone: UTC+3:30 (IRST)

Bank (Persian: بنک) (Note: Also romanized as Banak) is a city in the Central District of Kangan County, Bushehr province, Iran, serving as the administrative center for Howmeh Rural District. The village of Bank was converted to a city in 2003.

== Demographics ==
=== Population ===
At the time of the 2006 National Census, the city's population was 8,753 in 1,751 households. The following census in 2011 counted 11,515 people in 2,737 households. The 2016 census measured the population of the city as 14,126 people in 3,807 households.
