= Bandu, Dashti =

Coordinates: 27°19′38″N 52°51′56″E

Bandu بندو
- Village
- Interactive map of Bandu
- Country: Iran
- Province: Bushehr
- County: Dashti
- Bakhsh: Central
- Rural District: Markazi

Population (2006)
  - Total: 20
- Time zone: UTC+3:30 (IRST)
  - Summer (DST): UTC+4:30 (IRDT)

Bandu (Persian: بندو, also Romanized as Bandū) is a village in Markazi Rural District, in the Central District of Dashti County, Bushehr Province, Iran. At the 2006 census, its population was 20, in 4 families.
