= Bunud =

- Municipality
- Location within Azerbaijan Location within Shaki-Zagatala Economic Region
- Coordinates: 40°55′09″N 47°59′09″E
- Country: Azerbaijan
- Rayon: Qabala

Population
  - Total: 819
- Time zone: UTC+4 (AZT)
  - Summer (DST): UTC+5 (AZT)

Bunud (also, Bunut) is a village and municipality in the Qabala Rayon of Azerbaijan. It has a population of 819.
