= Howmeh Rural District (Kangan County) =

Rural district in Bushehr province, Iran

Howmeh Rural District Persian: دهستان حومه
- Rural District
- Location within Iran
- Coordinates: 27°51′N 52°06′E
- Country: Iran
- Province: Bushehr
- County: Kangan
- District: Central
- Established: 2002
- Capital: Bank

Population (2016)
  - Total: 3,358
- Time zone: UTC+3:30 (IRST)

Howmeh Rural District (Persian: دهستان حومه) is in the Central District of Kangan County, Bushehr province, Iran. It is administered from the city of Bank.

== Demographics ==
=== Population ===
At the time of the 2006 National Census, the rural district's population was 733 in 180 households. There were 1,869 inhabitants in 451 households at the following census of 2011. The 2016 census measured the population of the rural district as 3,358 in 812 households. The most populous of its seven villages was Barkeh-ye Chupan, with 1,235 people.

=== Other villages in the rural district ===
- Nakhl-e Ghanem
- Tonbak
