= Nakhl Taqi =

City in Bushehr province, Iran

Nakhl Taqi Persian: نخل تقی
- City
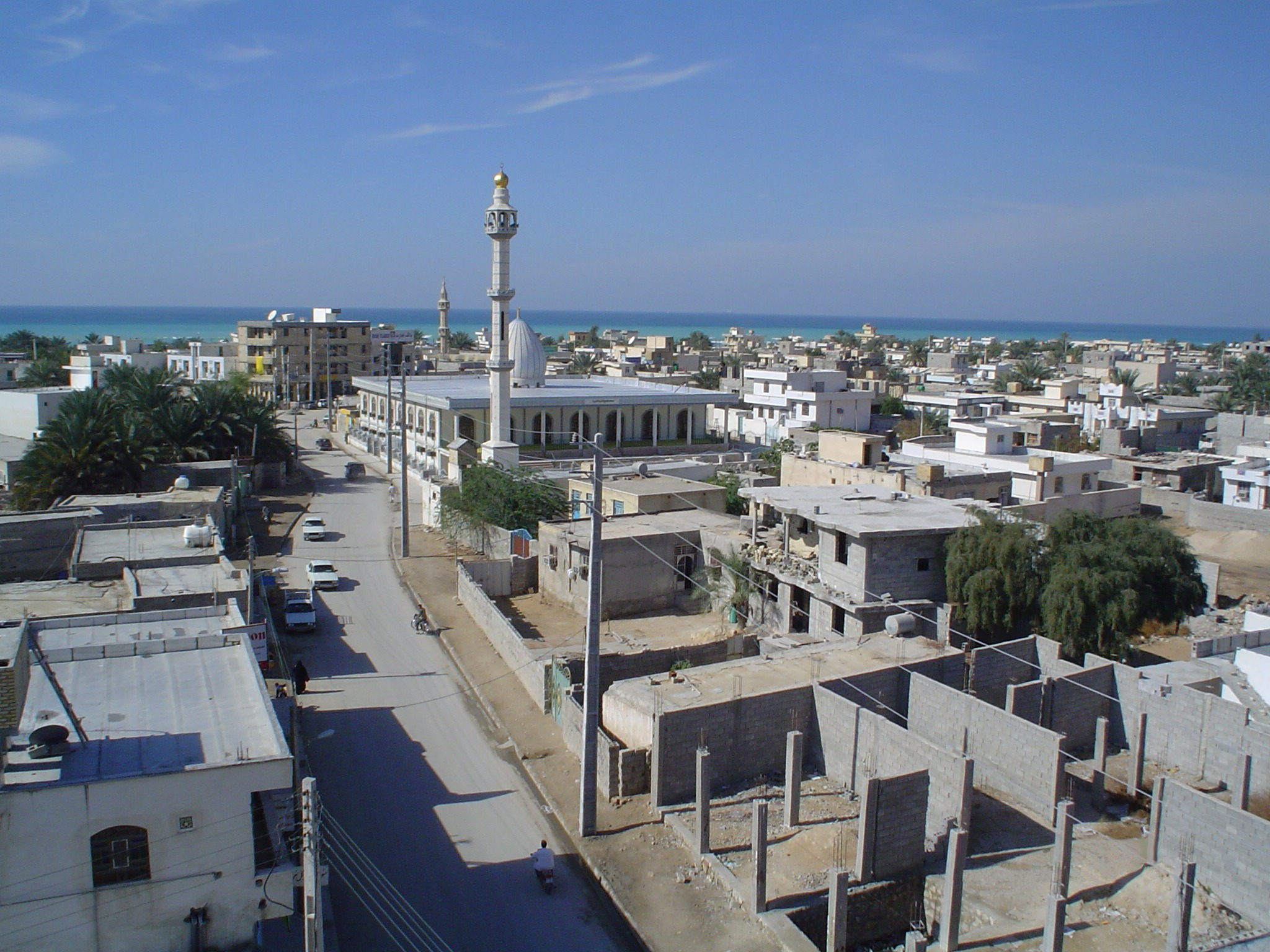
- The city of Nakhl Taqi

- Location within Iran
- Coordinates: 27°30′01″N 52°34′56″E
- Country: Iran
- Province: Bushehr
- County: Asaluyeh
- District: Central
- Established as a city: 2003

Population (2016)
  - Total: 18,837
- Time zone: UTC+3:30 (IRST)

Nakhl Taqi (Persian: نخل تقی) (Note: Also romanized as Nakhl Taqī, Nakhl-e Taqī, and Nakhl-i-Taqi; also known as Makhi-i-Taqi, Nakhl Takki, and Tagi) is a city in the Central District of Asaluyeh County, Bushehr province, Iran. The village of Nakhl Taqi was converted to a city in 2003.

== Demographics ==
=== Language ===
The linguistic composition of the city:

Nakhl Taqi linguistic composition
| language | percent |
| Arabic | 80% |
| Kanguni | 18% |
| Koroshi | 2% |

=== Population ===
At the time of the 2006 National Census, the city's population was 7,818 in 1,574 households, when it was in the former Asaluyeh District of Kangan County. The following census in 2011 counted 11,503 people in 2,433 households. The 2016 census measured the population of the city as 18,837 people in 4,632 households, by which time the district had been separated from the county in the establishment of Asaluyeh County. Nakhl Taqi was transferred to the new Central District.

== See also ==
Media related to Nakhl Taqi at Wikimedia Commons
