= M. S. Gowd =

Indian dental surgeon

M. S. Gowd‌
- Born: 23 September 1943; Medak, Telangana
- Other name: M.S. Goud
- Occupations: Dental surgeon, Prosthodontist

Dr. Manga Shiv Lingam Gowd (MDS (Bombay), FICD, FPFA, MICP (USA)), also known by the names M. S. Gowd or M. S. Goud, is a dental surgeon prosthodontist from Andhra Pradesh, India, with fellowship in the American Academy of Cosmetic Dentistry and many International Fellowships.

Dr. Gowd is an honorary dental surgeon to the Governor of Andhra Pradesh, Professor and Head of Department of Prosthodontics, acts as a Principal of Secunderabad Army College of Dental Sciences in Andhra Pradesh, and also the Founder-Chairman of Dr. Gowds Dental Hospitals at Hyderabad. He is past president of the Indian Prosthodontic Society. He is credited with many publications in his field.

== Personal details ==
Dr. Gowd was born on 23 September 1943 in Medak, Andhra Pradesh, India. He did his Bachelors in Dental Surgery in 1967 from Osmania University and obtained his Masters in Dental Surgery in 1971 from Bombay University. He has actively been practicing for the last 37 years. He is the father of two children who both are also dental surgeons: Dr. Vikas Gowd (son, profile) and Dr. Snigdha Gowd (daughter).

== Fellowships and awards ==
- Membership in the International Association for Dental Research, Virginia, United States.
- International memberships in the American Dental Association
- Fellow, American College of Dentists
- Fellow, Federation Dentistry International
- Fellow, International College of Dentists
- Fellow, International College of Prosthodontics
- Vydyasiromani Award presented by Megacity Navakala Vedika during Doctors Day Celebration in 2012. He is the only Indian to receive this honor.

== Books ==
Dr. Gowd is the author of several books detailing comprehensive dental care and dental education in several languages. He is the first Indian dental surgeon to publish books on dental care and dental education in four different languages.

- Smile, in English.
- Designing Smile To Smile, in English.
- Smile Redefined, in English.
- Oral Hygiene And Common Dental Problems, in English.
- Mee Chirunavvunu Saridhidukondi-Comprehensive Dental Care and Education, in Telugu.
- Muskaan, in Hindi.
- Muskurahat, in Urdu.
