= Bandar Kangan =

City in Bushehr province, Iran

Bandar Kangan Persian: بندر كنگان
- City
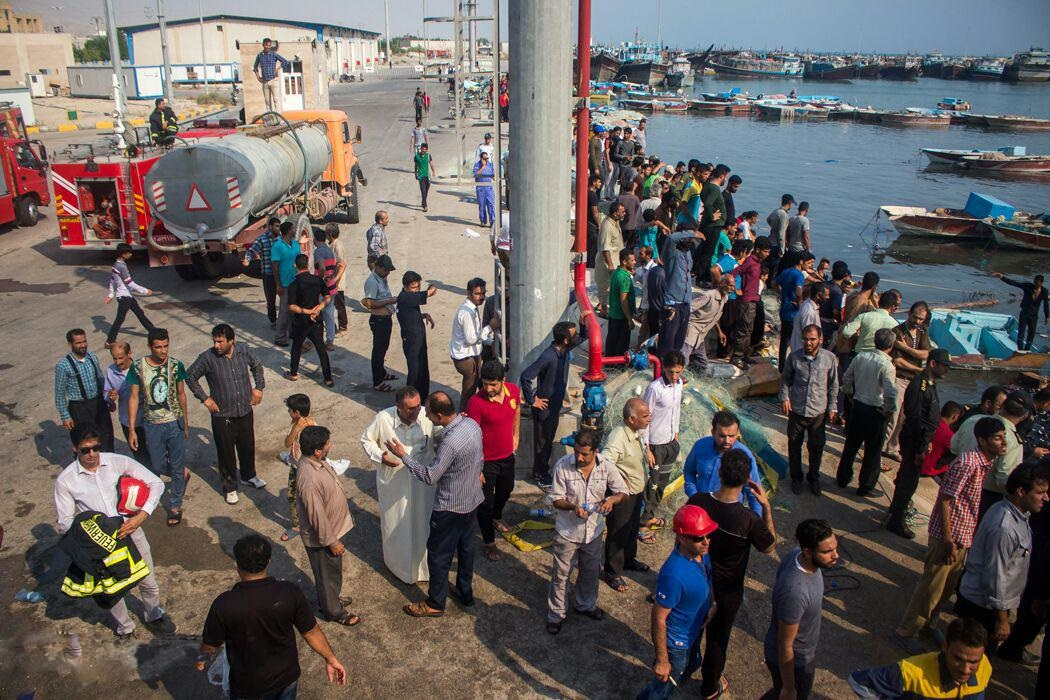
- Fire at Kangan Port Multipurpose Pier, causing 13 Kangan barges to burn

- Location within Iran
- Coordinates: 27°50′21″N 52°03′39″E
- Country: Iran
- Province: Bushehr
- County: Kangan
- District: Central

Population (2016)
  - Total: 60,187
- Time zone: UTC+3:30 (IRST)

Bandar Kangan (Persian: بندر كنگان) (Note: Also romanized as Bandar-e Kangān; also known as Kangān and Kangun) is a city in the Central District of Kangan County, Bushehr province, Iran, serving as capital of both the county and the district.

== Demographics ==
=== Language ===
The linguistic composition of the city:

Bandar Kangan linguistic composition
language	percent
Kanguni	60%
Arabic	25%
Balochi	0.3%
Other/Mixed	14.7%

=== Population ===
At the time of the 2006 National Census, the city's population was 23,921 in 5,200 households. The census in 2011 counted 76,329 people in 9,304 households. The 2016 census measured the population of the city as 60,187 people in 19,225 households.

== See also ==
Media related to Bandar Kangan at Wikimedia Commons
