= Siraf District =

District in Bushehr province, Iran

Siraf District Persian: بخش سیراف
- District
- Location within Iran
- Coordinates: 27°42′N 52°20′E
- Country: Iran
- Province: Bushehr
- County: Kangan
- Established: 2019
- Capital: Bandar Siraf
- Time zone: UTC+3:30 (IRST)

Siraf District (Persian: بخش مرکزی شهرستان کنگان) is in Kangan County, Bushehr province, Iran. Its capital is the city of Bandar Siraf, (Note: Formerly the village of Taheri) whose population at the time of the 2016 National Census was 6,992 in 1,949 households.

== History ==
In 2017, Taheri Rural District and the city of Bandar Siraf were separated from the Central District in the establishment of Siraf District, which was divided into two rural districts, including the new Shirinu Rural District. The village of Shirinu was elevated to the status of the city of Bandar-e Shirinu in 2023.

== Demographics ==
=== Administrative divisions ===
Siraf District
Administrative Divisions
Shirinu RD
Taheri RD
Bandar Siraf (city)
Bandar-e Shirinu (city) (Note: Became a city after the 2016 census)
RD = Rural District
