= Taheri Rural District =

Rural district in Bushehr province, Iran

Taheri Rural District Persian: دهستان طاهرئ
- Rural District
- Location within Iran
- Coordinates: 27°43′N 52°19′E
- Country: Iran
- Province: Bushehr
- County: Kangan
- District: Siraf
- Capital: Parak

Population (2016)
  - Total: 23,138
- Time zone: UTC+3:30 (IRST)

Taheri Rural District (Persian: دهستان طاهرئ) is in Siraf District of Kangan County, Bushehr province, Iran. Its capital is the village of Parak. The previous capital of the rural district was the village of Taheri, now the city of Bandar Siraf.

== Demographics ==
=== Population ===
At the time of the 2006 National Census, the rural district's population (as a part of the Central District) was 3,886 in 810 households. There were 8,320 inhabitants in 1,524 households at the following census of 2011. The 2016 census measured the population of the rural district as 23,138 in 2,080 households. The most populous of its 10 villages was Shirinu (now the city of Bandar-e Shirinu), with 9,976 people.

In 2019, the rural district was separated from the district in the formation of Siraf District.
