= Central District (Asaluyeh County) =

District in Bushehr province, Iran

Central District (Asaluyeh County) Persian: بخش مرکزی شهرستان عسلویه
- District
- Location within Iran
- Coordinates: 27°33′N 52°39′E
- Country: Iran
- Province: Bushehr
- County: Asaluyeh
- Established: 2013
- Capital: Asaluyeh

Population (2016)
  - Total: 56,255
- Time zone: UTC+3:30 (IRST)

The Central District of Asaluyeh County (Persian: بخش مرکزی شهرستان عسلویه) is in Bushehr province, Iran. Its capital is the city of Asaluyeh.

== History ==
In 2013, Asaluyeh District was separated from Kangan County in the establishment of Asaluyeh County, which was divided into two districts of two rural districts each, with Asaluyeh as its capital. The village of Bid Khun was converted to a city in 2019.

== Demographics ==
=== Population ===
At the time of the 2016 National Census, the district's population was 56,255 in 12,224 households.

=== Administrative divisions ===
Central District (Asaluyeh County) Population
Administrative Divisions	2016
Akhand RD	10,385
Asaluyeh RD	13,476
Asaluyeh (city)	13,557
Bid Khun (city) (Note: Became a city after the 2016 census)	
Nakhl Taqi (city)	18,837
Total	56,255
RD = Rural District
