= Asaluyeh Rural District =

Rural district in Bushehr province, Iran

Asaluyeh Rural District Persian: دهستان عسلويه
- Rural District
- Location within Iran
- Coordinates: 27°34′N 52°36′E
- Country: Iran
- Province: Bushehr
- County: Asaluyeh
- District: Central
- Established: 1986
- Capital: Asaluyeh

Population (2016)
  - Total: 13,476
- Time zone: UTC+3:30 (IRST)

Asaluyeh Rural District (Persian: دهستان عسلويه) is in the Central District of Asaluyeh County, Bushehr province, Iran. It is administered from the city of Asaluyeh.

== Demographics ==
=== Population ===
At the time of the 2006 National Census, the rural district's population (as a part of the former Asaluyeh District in Kangan County) was 31,319 in 2,476 households. There were 32,977 inhabitants in 3,513 households at the following census of 2011. The 2016 census measured the population of the rural district as 13,476 in 2,504 households, by which time the district had been separated from the county in the establishment of Asaluyeh County. The rural district was transferred to the new Central District. The most populous of its eight villages was Bid Khun (now a city), with 8,886 people.

=== Other villages in the rural district ===
- Boz Baz
