= Nayband Rural District =

Rural district in Bushehr province, Iran

Nayband Rural District Persian: دهستان نای بند
- Rural District
- Location within Iran
- Coordinates: 27°20′N 52°41′E
- Country: Iran
- Province: Bushehr
- County: Asaluyeh
- District: Chah-e Mobarak
- Established: 1986
- Capital: Zobar

Population (2016)
  - Total: 5,625
- Time zone: UTC+3:30 (IRST)

Nayband Rural District (Persian: دهستان نای بند) is in Chah-e Mobarak District of Asaluyeh County, Bushehr province, Iran. Its capital is the village of Zobar. The previous capital of the rural district was the village of Chah-e Mobarak, now a city.

== Demographics ==
=== Population ===
At the time of the 2006 National Census, the rural district's population (as a part of the former Asaluyeh District in Kangan County) was 10,437 in 1,632 households. The following census in 2011 counted 13,220 people in 2,709 households. The 2016 census measured the population of the rural district as 5,625 in 1,298 households, by which time the district had been separated from the county in the establishment of Asaluyeh County. The rural district was transferred to the new Chah-e Mobarak District. The most populous of its eight villages was Besatin, with 1,244 people.

=== Other villages in the rural district ===
- Bonud
- Haleh
- Kherreh
- Konar Kheymeh
- Safiyeh
