= Central District (Kangan County) =

District in Bushehr province, Iran

Central District (Kangan County) Persian: بخش مرکزی شهرستان کنگان
- District
- Location within Iran
- Coordinates: 27°50′N 52°06′E
- Country: Iran
- Province: Bushehr
- County: Kangan
- Capital: Bandar Kangan

Population (2016)
  - Total: 107,801
- Time zone: UTC+3:30 (IRST)

The Central District of Kangan County (Persian: بخش مرکزی شهرستان کنگان) is in Bushehr province, Iran. Its capital is the city of Bandar Kangan.

== History ==
In 2019, Tombak Rural District was created in the district, and Taheri Rural District and the city of Bandar Siraf were separated from it in the formation of Siraf District.

== Demographics ==
=== Population ===
At the time of the 2006 National Census, the district's population was 40,793 in 8,663 households. The following census in 2011 counted 105,190 people in 15,325 households. The 2016 census measured the population of the district as 107,801 inhabitants living in 27,873 households.

=== Administrative divisions ===
Central District (Kangan County) Population
Administrative Divisions	2006	2011	2016
Howmeh RD	733	1,889	3,358
Taheri RD (Note: Transferred to Siraf District after the 2016 census)	3,886	8,320	23,138
Tombak RD (Note: Established after the 2016 census)			
Bandar Kangan (city)	23,921	76,329	60,187
Bandar Siraf (city)	3,500	7,137	6,992
Bank (city)	8,753	11,515	14,126
Total	40,793	105,190	107,801
RD = Rural District
