= Chah-e Mobarak District =

District in Bushehr province, Iran

Chah-e Mobarak District Persian: بخش چاه مبارک
- District
- Location within Iran
- Coordinates: 27°20′N 52°46′E
- Country: Iran
- Province: Bushehr
- County: Asaluyeh
- Established: 2013
- Capital: Chah-e Mobarak

Population (2016)
  - Total: 17,703
- Time zone: UTC+3:30 (IRST)

Chah-e Mobarak District (Persian: بخش چاه مبارک) is in Asaluyeh County, Bushehr province, Iran. Its capital is the city of Chah-e Mobarak.

== History ==
In 2013, Asaluyeh District was separated from Kangan County in the establishment of Asaluyeh County, which was divided into two districts of two rural districts each, with the city of Asaluyeh as its capital. The village of Chah-e Mobarak was converted to a city in 2018.

== Demographics ==
=== Population ===
At the time of the 2016 National Census, the district's population was 17,703 in 4,272 households.

=== Administrative divisions ===
Chah-e Mobarak District Population
Administrative Divisions	2016
Chah-e Mobarak RD	12,078
Nayband RD	5,625
Chah-e Mobarak (city) (Note: Became a city after the 2016 census)	
Total	17,703
RD = Rural District
