= Asaluyeh County =

County in Bushehr province, Iran

Asaluyeh County Persian: شهرستان عسلویه
- County
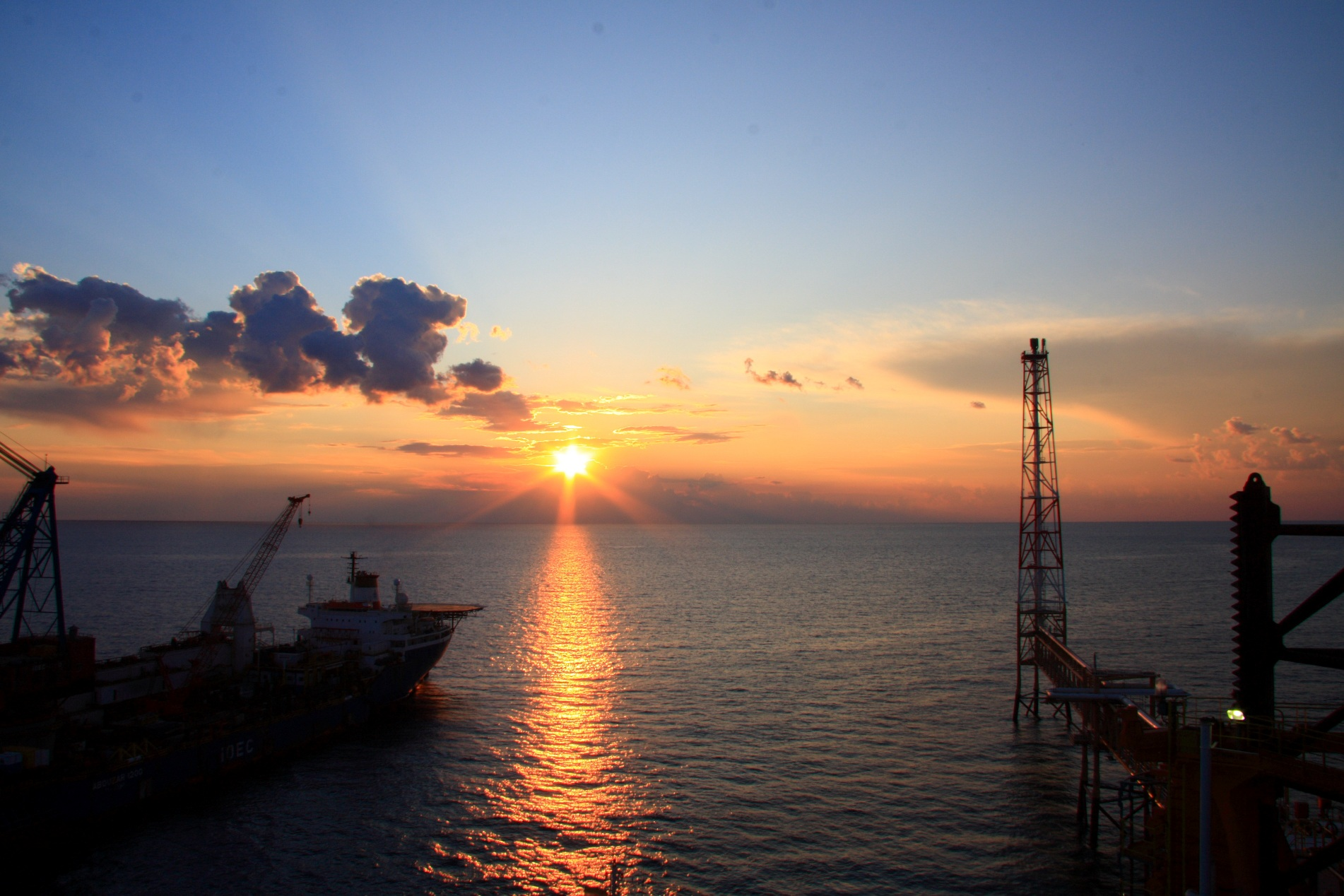
- Persian Gulf horizon from the South Pars area in Asaluyeh County

- Location of Asaluyeh County in Bushehr province (bottom, pink)

- Location of Bushehr province in Iran
- Coordinates: 27°27′N 52°44′E
- Country: Iran
- Province: Bushehr
- Established: 2013
- Capital: Asaluyeh
- Districts: Central, Chah-e Mobarak

Population (2016)
  - Total: 73,958
- Time zone: UTC+3:30 (IRST)

Asaluyeh County (Persian: شهرستان عسلویه) is in Bushehr province, Iran. Its capital is the city of Asaluyeh.

== History ==
In 2013, Asaluyeh District was separated from Kangan County in the establishment of Asaluyeh County, which was divided into two districts of two rural districts each, with Asaluyeh as its capital.

In 2018, the village of Chah-e Mobarak was converted to a city, and the village of Bid Khun rose to city status in 2019.

== Demographics ==
=== Population ===
At the time of the 2016 National Census, the county's population was 73,958 in 16,496 households.

=== Administrative divisions ===
Asaluyeh County's population and administrative structure are shown in the following table.

Asaluyeh County Population
Administrative Divisions	2016
Central District	56,255
Akhand RD	10,385
Asaluyeh RD	13,476
Asaluyeh (city)	13,557
Bid Khun (city) (Note: Became a city after the 2016 census)	
Nakhl Taqi (city)	18,837
Chah-e Mobarak District	17,703
Chah-e Mobarak RD	12,078
Nayband RD	5,625
Chah-e Mobarak (city) (Note: Became a city after the 2016 census)	
Total	73,958
RD = Rural District

== See also ==
Media related to Asaluyeh County at Wikimedia Commons
