= Asaluyeh District =

Former district in Bushehr province, Iran

Asaluyeh District Persian: بخش عسلویه
- Former District
- Location within Iran
- Coordinates: 27°27′N 52°44′E
- Country: Iran
- Province: Bushehr
- County: Kangan
- Established: 2002
- Capital: Asaluyeh

Population (2011)
  - Total: 65,584
- Time zone: UTC+3:30 (IRST)

Asaluyeh District (Persian: بخش عسلویه) is a former administrative division of Kangan County, Bushehr province, Iran. Its capital was the city of Asaluyeh.

== History ==
In 2013, the district was separated from the county in the establishment of Asaluyeh County.

== Demographics ==
=== Population ===
At the time of the 2006 census, the district's population was 54,320 in 6,557 households. The following census in 2011 counted 65,584 people in 10,364 households.

=== Administrative divisions ===
Central District (Kangan County) Population
Administrative Divisions	2006	2011
Asaluyeh RD	31,319	32,977
Nayband RD	10,437	13,220
Asaluyeh (city)	4,746	7,884
Nakhl Taqi (city)	7,818	11,503
Total	54,320	65,584
RD = Rural District
