= Kangan County =

County in Bushehr province, Iran

Kangan County Persian: شهرستان کنگان
- County
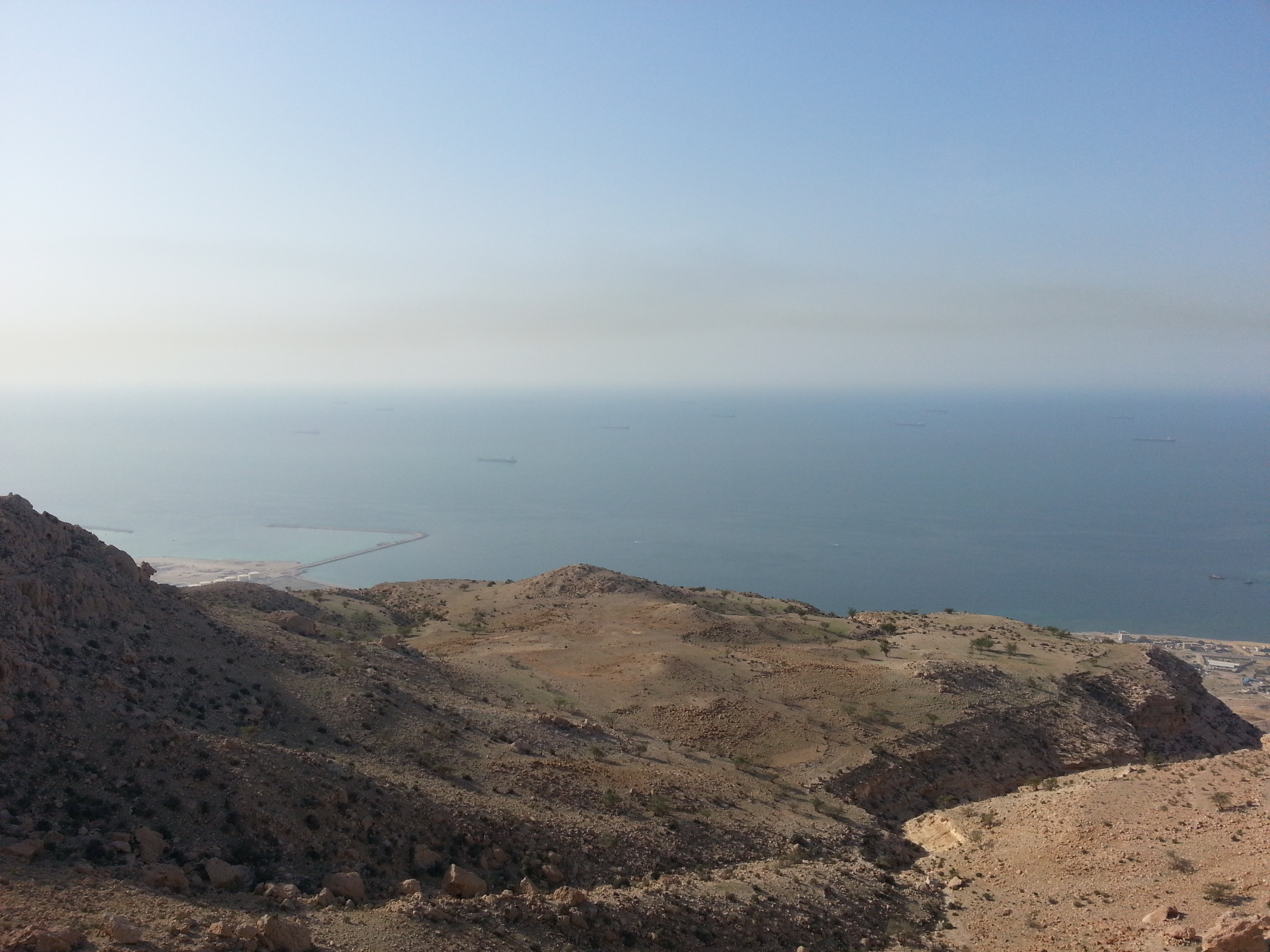
- Persian Gulf coastline in Kangan County

- Location of Kangan County in Bushehr province (bottom, yellow)

- Location of Bushehr province in Iran
- Coordinates: 27°42′N 52°16′E
- Country: Iran
- Province: Bushehr
- Capital: Bandar Kangan
- Districts: Central, Siraf

Population (2016)
  - Total: 107,801
- Time zone: UTC+3:30 (IRST)

Kangan County (Persian: شهرستان کنگان) is in Bushehr province, Iran. Its capital is the city of Bandar Kangan.

== History ==
Asaluyeh District was separated from the county in the establishment of Asaluyeh County in 2013.

In 2019, Tombak Rural District was created in the Central District, and Taheri Rural District and the city of Bandar Siraf were separated from it in the formation of Siraf District, which was divided into two rural districts, including the new Shirinu Rural District. The village of Shirinu was converted to the city of Bandar-e Shirinu in 2023.

== Demographics ==
=== Population ===
At the time of the 2006 National Census, the county's population was 95,113 in 15,220 households. The following census in 2011 counted 170,774 people in 25,667 households. The 2016 census measured the population of the county as 107,801 in 27,873 households.

=== Administrative divisions ===
Kangan County's population history and administrative structure over three consecutive censuses are shown in the following table.

Kangan County Population
Administrative Divisions	2006	2011	2016
Central District	40,793	105,190	107,801
Howmeh RD	733	1,889	3,358
Taheri RD	3,886	8,320	23,138
Tombak RD (Note: Established after the 2016 census)			
Bandar Kangan (city)	23,921	76,329	60,187
Bandar Siraf (city)	3,500	7,137	6,992
Bank (city)	8,753	11,515	14,126
Asaluyeh District (Note: Transferred to Asaluyeh County)	54,320	65,584	
Asaluyeh RD	31,319	32,977	
Nayband RD	10,437	13,220	
Asaluyeh (city)	4,746	7,884	
Nakhl Taqi (city)	7,818	11,503	
Siraf District			
Shirinu RD			
Taheri RD			
Bandar Siraf (city) (Note: Formerly the village of Taheri)			
Bandar-e Shirinu (city) (Note: Became a city after the 2016 census)			
Total	95,113	170,774	107,801
RD = Rural District

== See also ==
Media related to Kangan County at Wikimedia Commons
