= Jamshid Ghanbari Maman =

Iranian diplomat (born 1950)

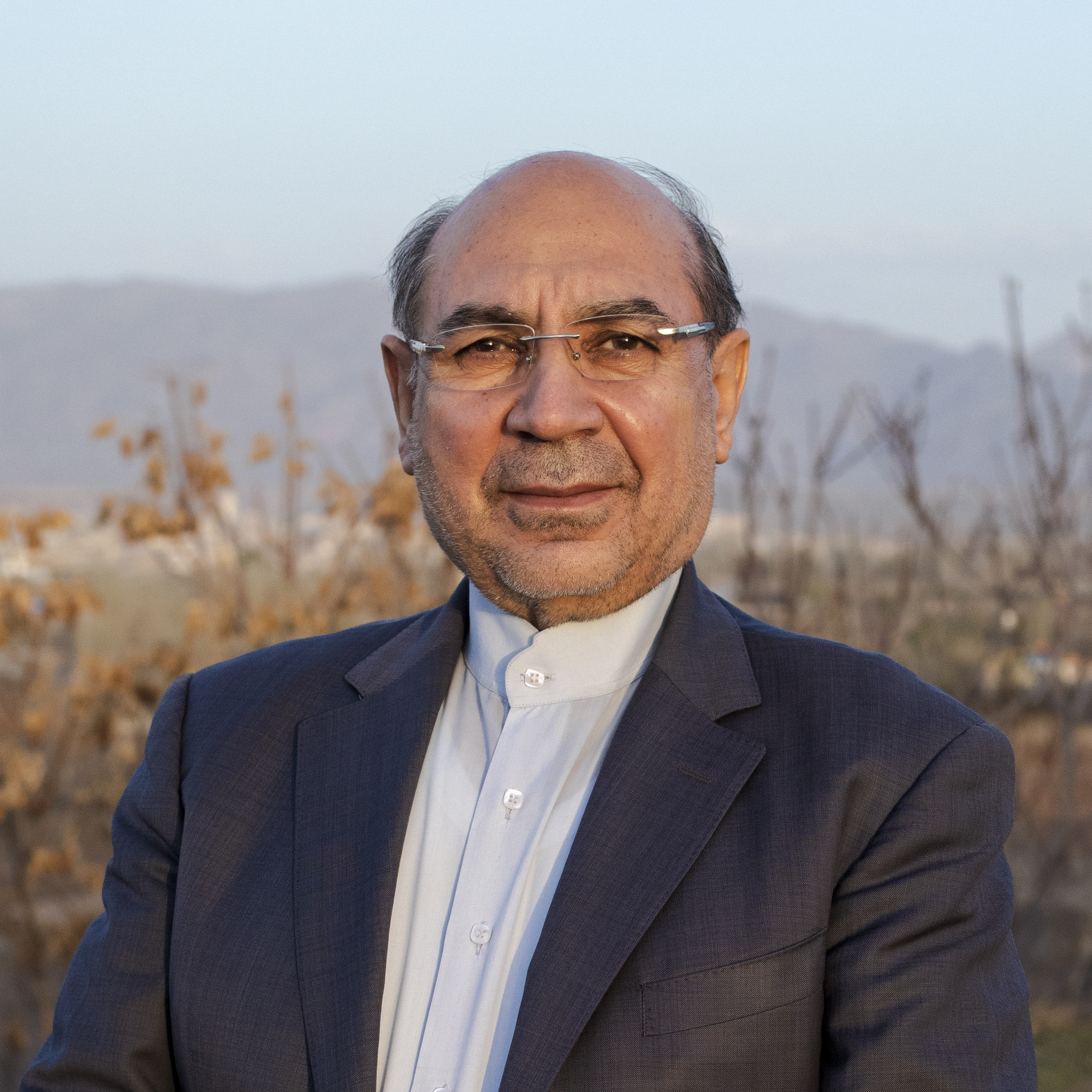

Adviser of Civil Commission of Islamic Consultative Assembly of I.R.Iran
- In office 2008 – Till Now

Senior Adviser of CEO of National Iranian Oil Company (NIOC)
- In office 2010–2012

Plenipotentiary representative of ministers of Ministry of Petroleum of I.R.Iran
- In office 2001–2010
- Minister: Bijan Namdar Zangeneh, Kazem Vaziri Hamaneh, Gholam-Hossein Nozari, Masoud Mir-Kazemi

chairman and CEO of Iranian Helicopter Company (IHC)
- In office 2000–2010
- Minister: Bijan Namdar Zangeneh, Kazem Vaziri Hamaneh, Gholam-Hossein Nozari, Masoud Mir-Kazemi

Senior Adviser of ministers of Ministry of Petroleum of I.R.Iran
- In office 2000–2007
- Minister: Bijan Namdar Zangeneh, Kazem Vaziri Hamaneh

Senior Adviser of ministers of Ministry of Road and Transportation of I.R.Iran
- In office 2000–2007
- Minister: Rahman Dadman, Ahmad Khorram, Mohammad Rahmati

chairman of Iranian Naft Airlines
- In office 2000–2004
- Minister: Bijan Namdar Zangeneh

chairman of Transportation, Housing and Urban Development Commission of Islamic Consultative Assembly of I.R.Iran-Fifth Parliament
- In office 1996–2000

Member of Parliament of Islamic Consultative Assembly of I.R.Iran-Fifth Parliament
- In office 1996–2000
- Constituency: Mianeh (electoral district)

First Deputy Chairman of Transportation, Housing and Urban Development Commission of Islamic Consultative Assembly of I.R.Iran-Fourth Parliament
- In office 1992–1996

Member of Parliament of Islamic Consultative Assembly of I.R.Iran-Fourth Parliament
- In office 1992–1996
- Constituency: Mianeh (electoral district)

Personal details
- Born: 1950 (age 75–76) Mianeh, East Azerbaijan province
- Education: Tarbiat Modares University
- Occupation: Diplomat, politician

Jamshid Ghanbari Maman (Persian: جمشید قنبری ممان, born in 1950 in Mianeh County-Village Maman) is an Iranian politician, former chief executive officer and expert on transportation who acts as an adviser of Civil Commission of Islamic Consultative Assembly of I.R.Iran. He was a member of Islamic Consultative Assembly of I.R.Iran in fourth and fifth parliament, also He has been active as First Deputy chairman (Fourth parliament) and chairman (Fifth parliament) of Transportation, Housing and Urban Development Commission of Islamic Consultative Assembly of I.R.Iran.

Since 2000; Mr. Ghanbari was chairman and CEO of Iranian Helicopter Company (IHC) for ten years, as Senior Adviser of the minister when Mr.Bijan Namdar Zangeneh and Mr.Kazem Vaziri Hamaneh were active as a minister of Ministry of Petroleum of I.R.Iran and, also Senior Adviser of the minister while Mr.Rahman Dadman, Mr.Ahmad Khorram and Mr.Mohammad Rahmati were active as a minister of Ministry of Road and Transportation of I.R.Iran for eight years, and chairman of Iranian Naft Airlines for four years.

Since 2001; He was Plenipotentiary representative of the minister of petroleum regarding to the owned airports of Ministry of Petroleum of I.R.Iran while Mr.Bijan Namdar Zangeneh, Mr.Kazem Vaziri Hamaneh, Mr.Gholam-Hossein Nozari and Mr.Masoud Mir-Kazemi were active as minister of the ministry for nine years. Also, he was Senior Adviser of CEO of National Iranian Oil Company (NIOC) from 2010 to 2012.

== Records ==
- Adviser of Civil Commission of Islamic Consultative Assembly of I.R.Iran, since 2008
- Senior Adviser of CEO of National Iranian Oil Company (NIOC) for two years, from 2010 to 2012
- chairman and CEO of Iranian Helicopter Company (IHC) for ten years, from 2000 to 2010
- Plenipotentiary representative of the minister of petroleum regarding to the owned airports of Ministry of Petroleum of I.R.Iran for ten years, from 2000 to 2010
- Senior Adviser of the minister of Petroleum for eight years, from 2000 to 2007
- Senior Adviser of the minister of Road and Transportation for eight years, from 2000 to 2007
- chairman of Iranian Naft Airlines for four years, from 2000 to 2007
- chairman of Transportation, Housing and Urban Development Commission of Islamic Consultative Assembly of I.R.Iran-Fifth parliament for four years, from 1996 to 2000
- Member of Parliament of Islamic Consultative Assembly of I.R.Iran-Fifth Parliament with 49.8% of votes cast for four years, from 1996 to 2000
- First Deputy Chairman of Transportation, Housing and Urban Development Commission of Islamic Consultative Assembly of I.R.Iran-Fourth Parliament for four years, from 1992 to 1996
- Member of Parliament of Islamic Consultative Assembly of I.R.Iran-Fourth Parliament with 44.2% of votes cast for four years, from 1992 to 1996
- Head of Department of Electrical Engineering of Iran Civil Aviation Organization and Expert in charge of Electronic Flight Control Center during Holy Defense (Iran–Iraq War)
- Expert in charge of Electrical Engineering Airlines of Iran Civil Aviation Organization for sixteen years, from 1976 to 1992

== Memberships ==
- Joint Commission of Islamic Consultative Assembly of I.R.Iran
- Committee of the Third Development Plan in Ministry of Road and Transportation of I.R.Iran
- Committee of the Third Development Plan in Ministry of Housing and Urban Development
- Council of Occupation of East Azerbaijan province, selected by Islamic Consultative Assembly of I.R.Iran
- International Summit of Inter-Parliamentary held in China, selected by Islamic Consultative Assembly of I.R.Iran
- International Summit of International Civil Aviation Organization held in Canada (Three Periods)
