= Hossein Hashemi =

Iranian politician

Seyyed Hossein Hashemi
- حسین هاشمی
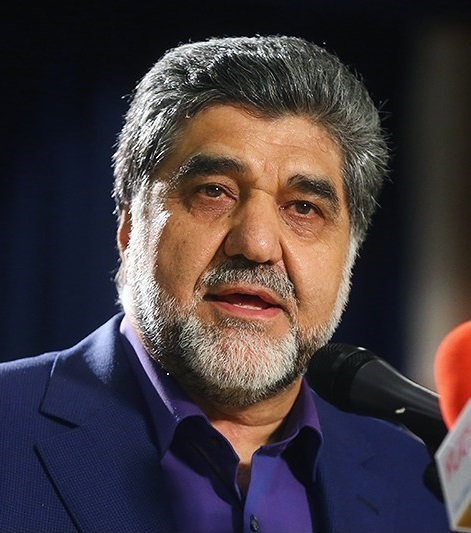
- Hashemi in 2016

Governor of Tehran
- In office 8 September 2013 – 24 September 2017
- President: Hassan Rouhani
- Preceded by: Morteza Tamadon
- Succeeded by: Mohammad-Hossein Moghimi

Member of the Parliament of Iran
- In office 3 May 1992 – 26 May 2012
- Preceded by: Jamshid Ghanbari Maman
- Succeeded by: Mohammad Ali Madadi
- Constituency: Mianeh
- Majority: 60,380 (61.8%)

Personal details
- Born: 7 July 1953 (age 73) Mianeh, Iran
- Party: Executives of Construction Party
- Education: University of Tehran

Hossein Hashemi (Persian: حسین هاشمی born 7 July 1953, Mianeh, East Azerbaijan) is an Iranian politician who served as Governor of Tehran province from September 8, 2013, to September 24, 2017. He was previously a member of the Parliament from 1992 to 2012. He was also Head of Department of Industries at the Parliament and also President of Iran's Cycling Federation from 1995 to 2005.

Political offices
Preceded by Mohammad Hossein Moghimi	Deputy Minister of Interior; 2017–present	Incumbent
Preceded by Morteza Tamadon	Governor of Tehran; 2013–2017	Succeeded by Mohammad Hossein Moghimi
Sporting positions
Preceded by Asghar Ebrahimi	President of Cycling Federation of Iran; 1995–2005	Succeeded by Amir Reza Vaezi-Ashtiani
