= Green Petrol SEI =

Green Petrol SEI (GPSEI)
- Company type: Private
- Industry: Manufacturing
- Founded: 1998
- Headquarters: Tehran
- Key people: Javad Hajibeygi, Masoud Tajrishi
- Products: Fuel Dispensers; Point of Sale Systems
- Number of employees: ~100 (2014)
- Parent: NPS co.
- Website: http://www.GPSEI.com

Green Petrol, (GPSEI) is one of the Iranian largest providers of fuel retailing solutions. It's a supplier of fuel dispensers, point of sale systems, Station Equipment, and Fuel Tanker Level Gauge systems and support services. The company's headquarters is in Tehran, IRAN with sales, manufacturing, research, development and service locations in different parts of Iran.

== History ==
The company was founded under the name Green Petrol in 2005 by Javad Hajibeygi and Masoud Tajrishi. In 2006 Green Petrol started to cooperate with NPS co.

== Products ==
- Green Petrol supplies automatic tank gauging and fuel management systems
- Green Petrol is a manufacturer of dispenser pumps and marketer of Submersible pumps, Tank level gauge, Electronic Counter Counter and other equipment.

== See also ==
- National Iranian Oil Refining and Distribution Company
- National Iranian Oil Company
- Official NIORDC Website
- Iran's Refinery Expansion Projects
