= Bandar Abbas Oil Refinery =

Oil refinery in Bandar Abbas, Iran

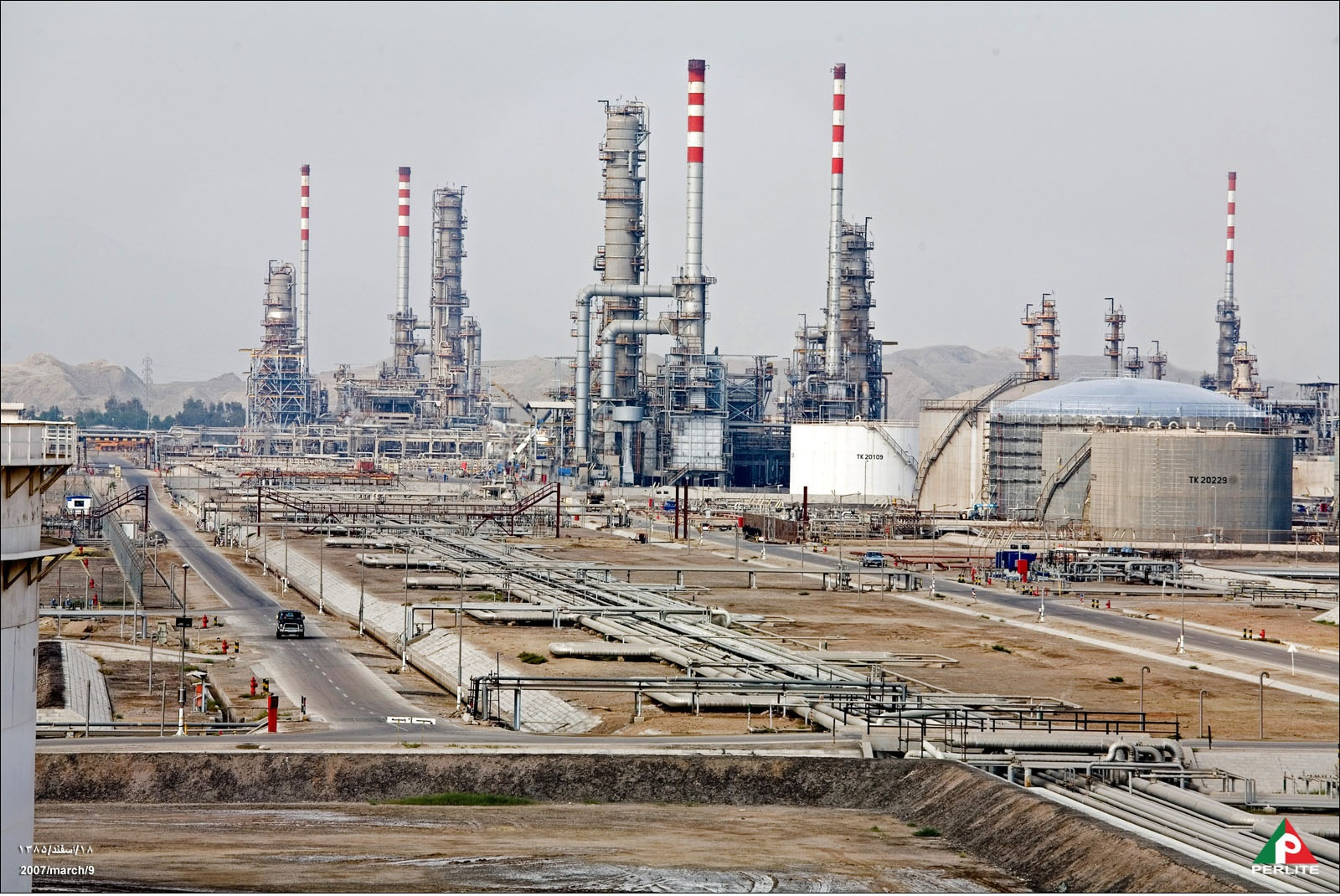
- Bandar Abbas Refinery (2017)

- Location within Iran
- Location: Bandar Abbas, Hormozgan province, Iran; 27°10′27″N 56°04′42″E

Refinery details
- Operator: National Iranian Oil Refining and Distribution Company
- Owner: Ministry of Petroleum, Iran

Bandar Abbas Oil Refinery, also known as Refinery No. 8, is situated near the city of Bandar Abbas in southern Iran.

== History ==
The refinery was conceptualized in the 1960s because Bandar Abbas's location, which is strategically situated near the Persian Gulf, was chosen for its deep-water access and proximity to crude oil reserves.

A partnership between Snamprogetti and Chiyoda Corporation led to the construction of the refinery, with the Italian company responsible for engineering, procurement, and project supervision. It covers an area of 7 square kilometers, and processes heavy crude oil along with condensate transported from the Sarkhoon gas processing complex.

As of 2020, it is the third-largest refinery in Iran after Abadan and Isfahan refineries. Currently, its stated capacity exceeds 320,000 barrels per day (BPD).

== Accidents ==
- In September 2023, during emergency repairs, five maintenance workers were involved in an accident, and one worker died.

== Gallery ==
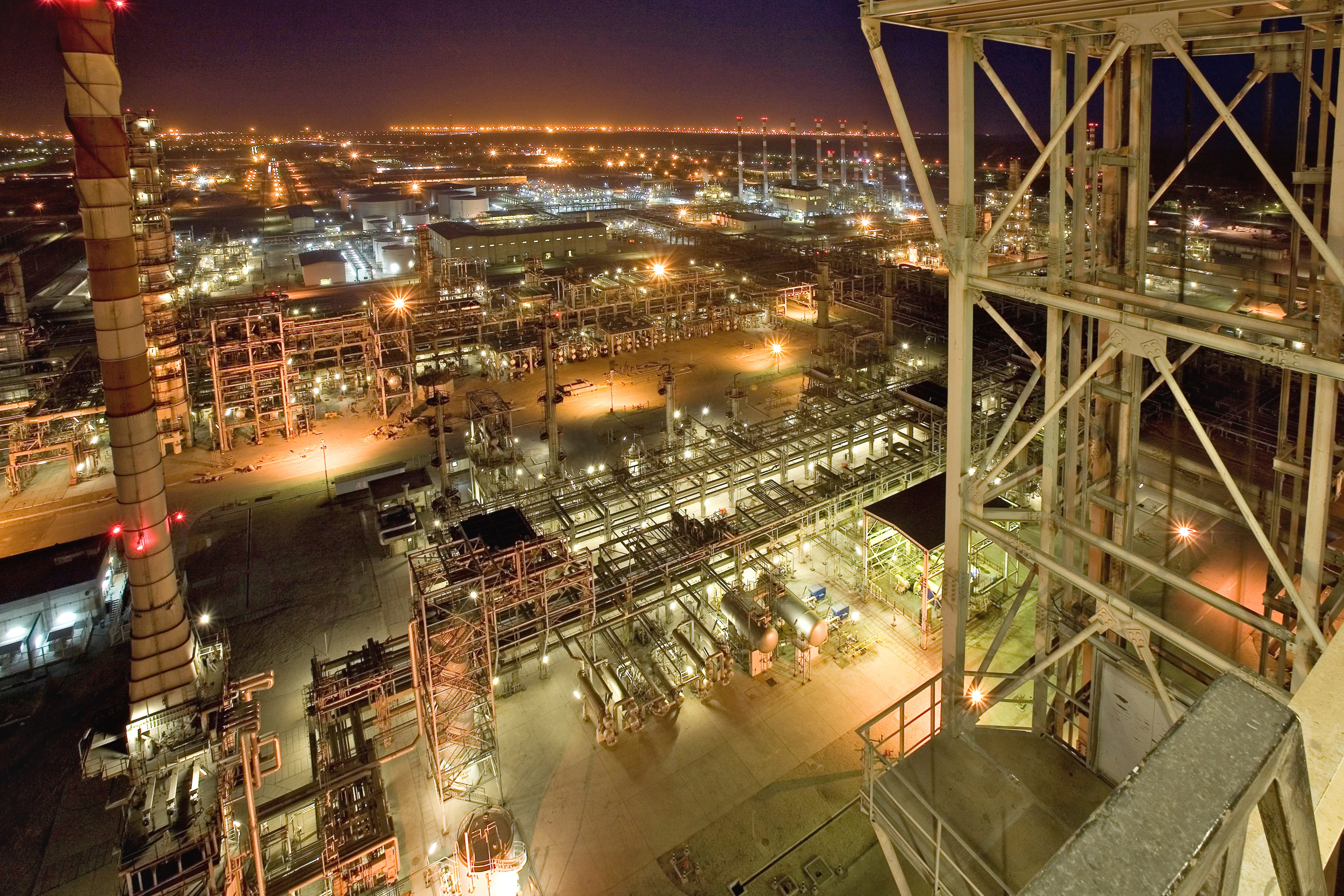
Bandar Abbas Refinery (2017)
