= Mohsen Paknejad =

Iranian politician and executive director

- محسن پاک‌نژاد
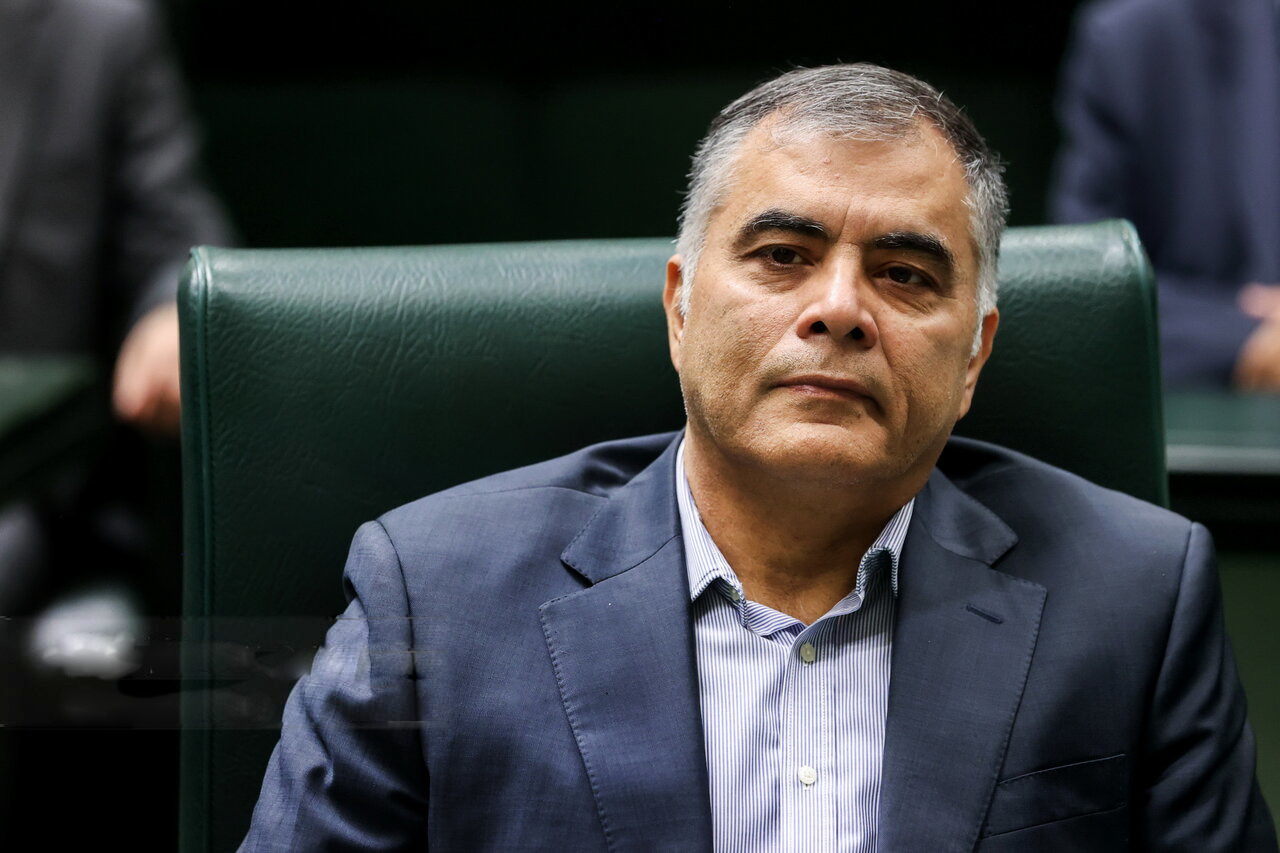
- Paknejad in 2024

Minister of Petroleum
- In office 21 August 2024 – 4 October 2026
- President: Masoud Pezeshkian
- Preceded by: Javad Owji
- Succeeded by: Hamid Bovard (acting)

Personal details
- Born: 1966 (age 59–60) Tehran, Iran

Mohsen Paknejad (born 1966) is an Iranian politician and executive director who served as the Minister of Petroleum of Iran from 2024 until his resignation in 2026.

From 2004 to 2006, Paknejad held the position of planning director at Iran's Central Regions Oil Company. In 2006, he advanced to the role of deputy director of Integrated Planning at the National Iranian Oil Company, where he remained until 2013. In 2014, he returned to the Ministry of Petroleum's headquarters and served as the Director General overseeing the export and exchange of petroleum products until 2015.

From 2015 to 2017, Paknejad took on the roles of CEO and vice chairman of the board of directors at NICO. On August 11, 2024, he was presented to the Islamic Council as the candidate for the position of oil minister in the 14th government.

On July 14, 2026, Oil Minister Mohsen Paknejad said Iran's oil exports will continue despite the U.S. decision to end a 60-day sanctions waiver. He told Iran International that "Because the structures needed to sustain Iran's oil exports have been preserved, the country's oil exports will continue as before, and we will not face any problems in this regard."

On 4 October 2026, Paknejad's resignation as Minister of Petroleum was approved by president Masoud Pezeshkian, and Hamid Bovard was appointed acting minister.
