= Marzieh Shah-Daei =

Iranian Deputy Minister of Petroleum in 2017–2019

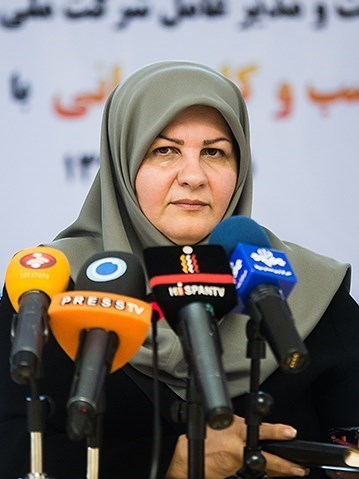
- Shah-Daei on a 13 April 2016 press conference
- Born: Marzieh Shah-Daei; 14 February 1962 (age 64); Tehran, Imperial State of Iran
- Education: University of Calgary; Sharif University of Technology
- Years active: Since 1989; 37 years ago
- Organization: Ministry of Petroleum (Iran)

Marzieh Shah-Daei (Persian: مرضیه شاهدایی; born 14 February 1962) was the Deputy Minister of Petroleum from 2017 to 2019. As an Iranian engineer, she was the former Executive Director of National Petrochemical Company, as well as "Vice Minister of Petroleum on Petrochemical affairs" from 2016 to 2017.

Government offices
| Preceded by Kazem Vaziri Hamaneh | Deputy Minister of Petroleum; 2017–2019 | Succeeded by Vacant |
| Preceded by Abbas Sheri-Moghadam | Vice Minister of Petroleum for Petrochemical Affairs; 2016–2017 | Succeeded by Reza Norouzzadeh |
Business positions
| Preceded by Abbas Sheri-Moghadam | Chief Executive Officer of National Petrochemical Company; 2016–2017 | Succeeded by Reza Norouzzadeh |
