= Arak Oil Refinery =

Iranian oil refinery

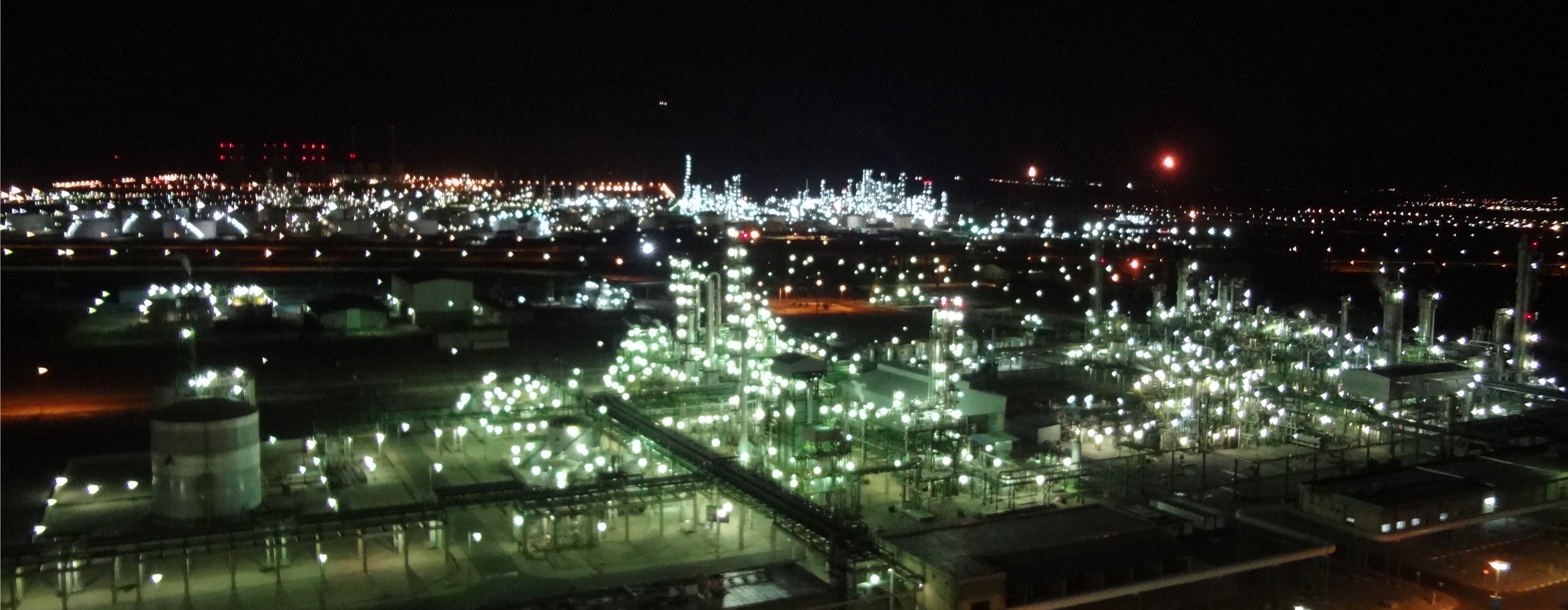
- Arak Oil Refinery (2014)

- Location within Iran
- Location: Arak, Iran, Markazi province, Iran; 34.004467°N 49.474514°E

Refinery details
- Operator: National Iranian Oil Refining and Distribution Company
- Owner: Ministry of Petroleum, Iran

Arak Oil Refinery or Arak Oil Refining Company (Persian: شركت پالايش نفت اراک) is an Iranian oil refining and petrochemical company which is located at 20 km from Arak, in Markazi Province. Arak Petrochemical Company is located at next to Arak oil refinery.

== Production ==
The production estimated 170,000 barrels/day in 2013, it announced by NIORDC in 2020 as 250,000 barrels per day.
