= Bijan Namdar Zangeneh =

Iranian politician

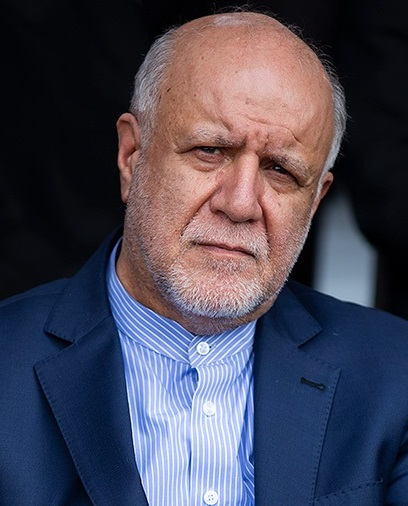

5th & 10th Minister of Petroleum
- In office 15 August 2013 – 25 August 2021
- President: Hassan Rouhani
- Deputy: Kazem Vaziri Hamaneh; Marzieh Shah-Daei
- Preceded by: Rostam Ghasemi
- Succeeded by: Javad Owji
- In office 20 August 1997 – 24 August 2005
- President: Mohammad Khatami
- Preceded by: Gholam Reza Aghazadeh
- Succeeded by: Kazem Vaziri Hamaneh

11th Minister of Energy
- In office 20 September 1988 – 20 August 1997
- President: Ali Khamenei; Akbar Hashemi Rafsanjani
- Prime Minister: Mir-Hossein Mousavi
- Preceded by: Abolhassan Khamoushi (Acting)
- Succeeded by: Habibollah Bitaraf

1st Minister of Jihad of Construction
- In office 20 February 1984 – 20 September 1988
- President: Ali Khamenei
- Prime Minister: Mir-Hossein Mousavi
- Preceded by: Office established
- Succeeded by: Gholamreza Forouzesh

Personal details
- Born: 21 September 1952 (age 74) Kermanshah, Iran
- Party: Executives of Construction Party
- Children: 4
- Education: University of Tehran

Bijan Namdar Zangeneh (Persian: بيژن نامدار زنگنه; born 21 September 1952) is an Iranian politician, who served as minister, at different cabinets after the Islamic Revolution, for 30 years. He lately served as Minister of Petroleum from 2013 to 2021 in the cabinet led by Hassan Rouhani.

Zangeneh is under US sanctions.

== Early life and education ==
Zangeneh was born to a Kurdish family in Kermanshah in 1952. He spent his early school years in his hometown before moving to Tehran, where he received his high school diploma. He received his MSc in civil engineering from the University of Tehran in 1977 and then became a Civil Engineering professor at K. N. Toosi University of Technology until his retirement in 2006.

== Career and activities ==
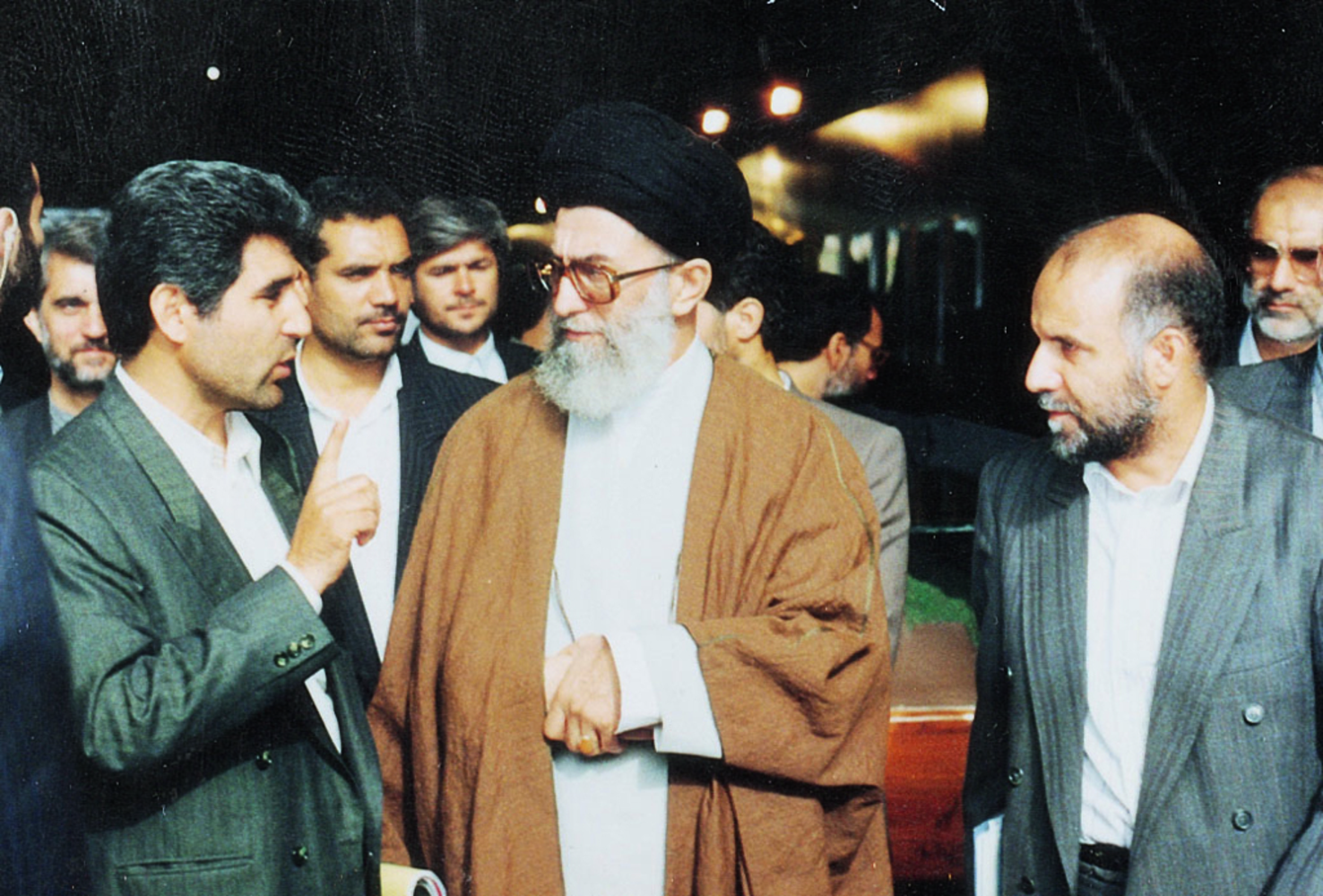
Namdar Zanganeh (right) as minister of energy with Ali Khamenei, visiting Karkheh Dam, 14 March 1997.

Following the 1979 revolution, Zangeneh was appointed deputy for the minister of culture and Islamic guidance in 1980. In 1983, he was made minister of construction jihad. He was appointed minister of energy in the government of Mir-Hossein Mousavi in 1988. He also served as the energy minister in Akbar Hashemi Rafsanjani's cabinet and made massive efforts for reconstruction and rehabilitation of the country's water and electricity industry in the aftermath of the 1980–1988 Iran–Iraq War and the damages caused to the industry in the Iraqi attacks. He was the minister of petroleum in Mohammad Khatami's cabinet. Zangeneh was replaced by Kazem Vaziri Hamane in the post on 29 August 2005 as appointed by President Mahmoud Ahmadinejad.

He was appointed a member of the Expediency Council by the Supreme Leader, Ayatollah Ali Khamenei, in 1996. He taught at several universities and academic centers; but he was basically a faculty member at K. N. Toosi University of Technology.

In early August 2013, Zangeneh was nominated as the petroleum minister by President Rouhani and was confirmed on 15 August. On 21 August Zanganeh was named as the head of Gas Exporting Countries Forum (GECF) for 2013. Kazem Vaziri Hamaneh was appointed Zangeneh's deputy on 3 September.

== International sanctions ==
Zangeneh was sanctioned by the US Department of Treasury. The sanction was part of a wider effort by the US government to sanction industries and sectors of the Iranian economy that are used to provide financial support to terrorism.

Political offices
Preceded by Position established	Minister of Agriculture; 1983–1988	Succeeded by Gholamreza Forouzesh
Preceded by Mohammad-Taqi Banqi	Minister of Energy; 1988–1997	Succeeded by Habibollah Bitaraf
Preceded by Gholam Reza Aghazadeh	Minister of Petroleum; 1997–2005	Succeeded by Kazem Vaziri Hamane
Preceded by Rostam Ghasemi	Minister of Petroleum; 2013–2021	Succeeded by Javad Owji
