= Mianeh (electoral district) =

Constituency of the Iranian parliament

- Electoral district constituency for the East Azerbaijan
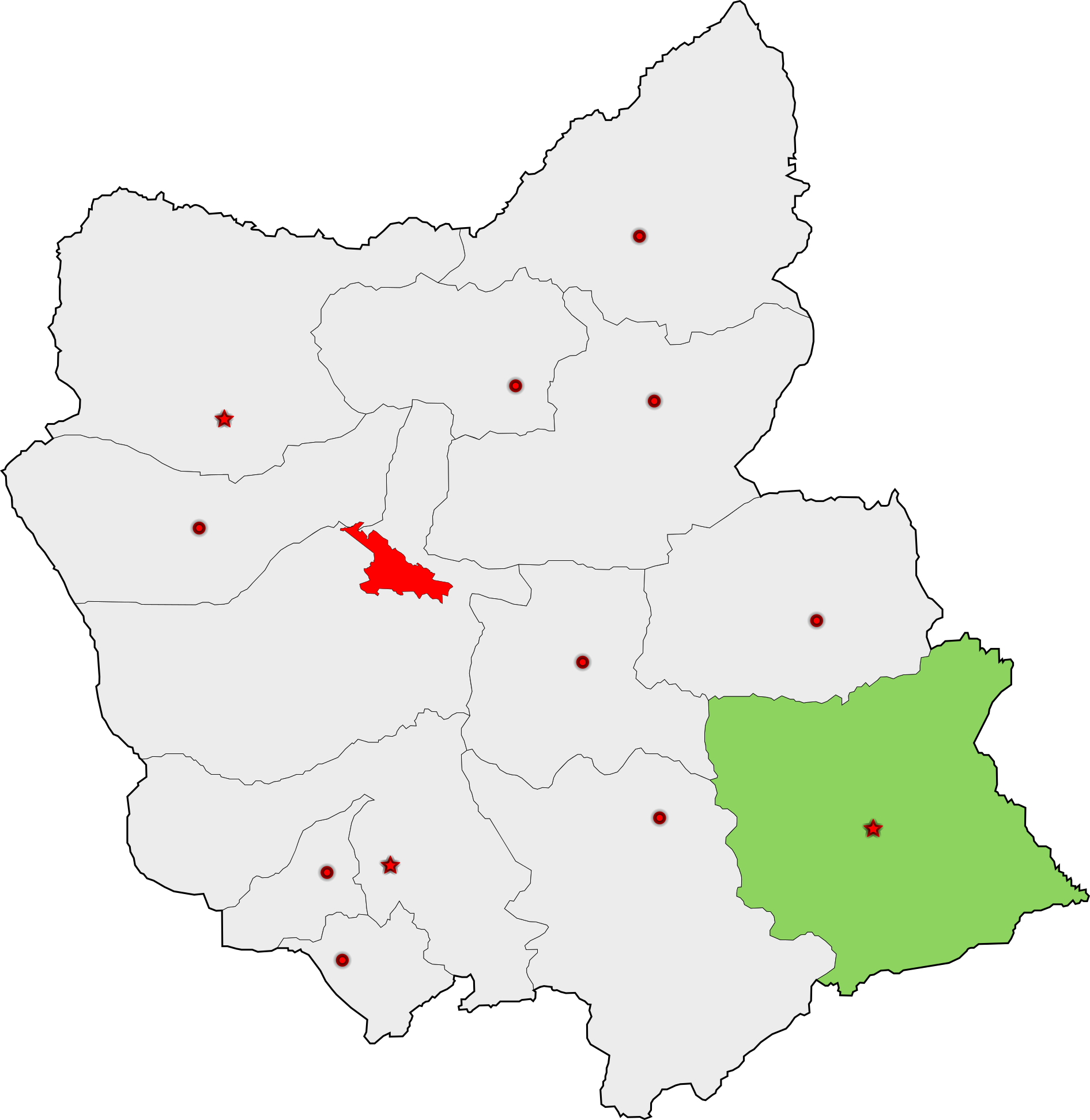
- Mianeh shown within East Azerbaijan Province
- East Azerbaijan: Mianeh County

Current constituency
- Assembly Members: Fardin Farmand; Yaqub Shivyari

Mianeh (electoral district) is the 5th electoral district in the East Azerbaijan Province of Iran. This electoral district has a population of 185,806 and elects 2 members of parliament.

== 1980 ==
MPs in 1980 from the electorate of Mianeh. (1st)

- Sajjad Hojaji
- Mosa Salimi

== 1984 ==
MPs in 1984 from the electorate of Mianeh. (2nd)

- Hokollah Pezeshki
- Mosa Salimi

== 1988 ==
MPs in 1988 from the electorate of Mianeh. (3rd)

- Sajjad Hojaji
- Mosa Salimi

== 1992 ==
MPs in 1992 from the electorate of Mianeh. (4th)

- Jamshid Ghanbari
- Hossein Hashemi

== 1996 ==
MPs in 1996 from the electorate of Mianeh. (5th)

- Jamshid Ghanbari
- Hossein Hashemi

== 2000 ==
MPs in 2000 from the electorate of Mianeh. (6th)

- Mohammad Kiafar
- Hossein Hashemi

== 2004 ==
MPs in 2004 from the electorate of Mianeh. (7th)

- Bahlul Hoseini
- Hossein Hashemi

== 2008 ==
MPs in 2008 from the electorate of Mianeh. (8th)

- Mohammadreza Haji-Asghari
- Hossein Hashemi

== 2012 ==
MPs in 2012 from the electorate of Mianeh. (9th)

- Bahlul Hoseini
- Mohammad Ali Madadi

== 2016 ==
2016 Iranian legislative election
#	Candidate	List(s)	Votes	%
1	Fardin Farmand	Independent politician	94,564	
2	Yaqub Shivyari	Principlists Coalition	23,919	
