= Mohammad-Hossein Moghimi =

Iranian politician

Mohammad Hossein Moghimi
- محمدحسین مقیمی
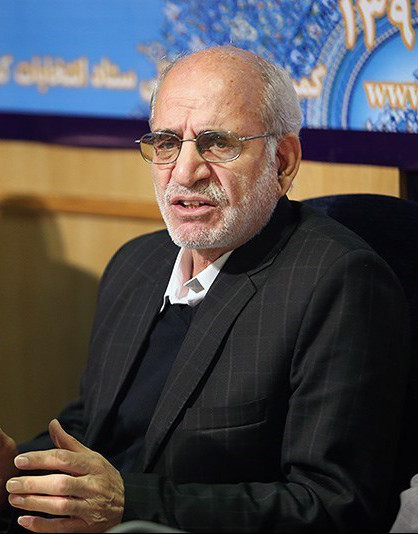

Governor of Tehran Province
- In office 24 September 2017 – 17 November 2018
- President: Hassan Rouhani
- Preceded by: Hossein Hashemi
- Succeeded by: Anoushirvan Mohseni Bandpey

Governor of Markazi Province
- In office 7 October 2013 – 18 January 2015
- President: Hassan Rouhani
- Preceded by: Ali-Akbar Shabani
- Succeeded by: Shokrollah Hassanbeygi

Member of the Iranian Parliament
- In office 28 May 2008 – 28 May 2012
- Constituency: Khomein
- Majority: 29,244 (56.74%)

Acting Mayor of Tehran
- In office 20 January 2003 – 3 May 2003
- Appointed by: Abdolvahed Mousavi Lari
- Preceded by: Mohammad-Hassan Malekmadani
- Succeeded by: Mahmoud Ahmadinejad

Governor of Kermanshah Province
- In office 1997–2001
- President: Mohammad Khatami
- Preceded by: Gholamreza Sahraiyan
- Succeeded by: Ahmad Torknejad

Governor of Khuzestan Province
- In office 1993–1997
- President: Akbar Hashemi Rafsanjani
- Preceded by: Morteza Roozbeh
- Succeeded by: Ahmad Khorram

Personal details
- Born: c. 1950 (age 75–76) Rostaq, Iran
- Party: Executives of Construction Party
- Education: Shiraz University; Amir Kabir University of Technology
- Occupation: Politician
- Profession: Engineer
- Awards: Order of Construction (2nd class)

Mohammad-Hossein Moghimi (Persian: محمدحسین مقیمی) is an Iranian politician who was former Governor of Tehran Province.

== Electoral history ==
Year	Election	Votes	%	Rank	Notes
2008	Parliament	29,244	56.74	1st	Won
2012	Parliament	▼19,238	▼35.21	2nd	Lost

Government offices
Preceded by Kazem Mirvalad	Vice Minister of Interior for Political Affairs; 19 January 2015 – 7 December 2016	Succeeded by Ali-Asghar Ahmadi
Preceded by Sowlat Mortazavi	Head of Country's Election Headquarters; 2016 legislative election 2016 Assembly of Experts election	Succeeded by Ali-Asghar Ahmadi
Preceded by Hossein-Ali Amiri	Deputy Minister of Interior; 2016–2017	Succeeded by Hossein Hashemi
Preceded by Hossein Hashemi	Governor of Tehran Province; 2017–2018	Succeeded by Anoushirvan Mohseni
