= Abolhassan Khamoushi =

Iranian politician

Minister of Energy Acting
- In office 13 June 1987 – 20 September 1988
- President: Ali Khamenei
- Prime Minister: Mir-Hossein Mousavi
- Preceded by: Mohammad-Taghi Banki
- Succeeded by: Bijan Namdar Zanganeh

Personal details
- Born: Seyed Abolhassan Seyed Khamoushi
- Party: Islamic Coalition Party
- Other political affiliations: Islamic Republican Party (1979–1987)
- Relatives: Alinaghi Khamoushi (brother); Taghi Khamoushi (brother)

Abolhassan Khamoushi (Persian: ابوالحسن خاموشی) is an Iranian conservative politician who served as the caretaker for the ministry of energy in the cabinet of Mir-Hossein Mousavi.

In December 2001, he was appointed as head of the Petroleum Engineering and Development Company (PEDEC), a subordinate to the state-owned National Iranian Oil Company.
