= Morteza Tamaddon =

Iranian politician

- مرتضی تمدن
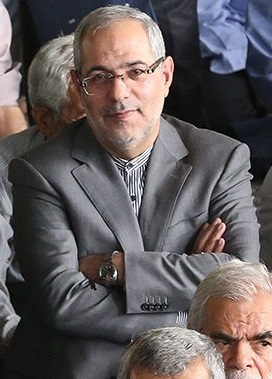
- Tamadon in 2016

Governor of Tehran
- In office 17 July 2008 – 7 September 2013
- President: Mahmoud Ahmadinejad
- Preceded by: Kamran Daneshjoo
- Succeeded by: Hossein Hashemi

Member of the Parliament of Iran
- In office 28 May 2004 – 27 May 2008
- Preceded by: Mohammad Raesi
- Succeeded by: Nasrollah Torabi
- Constituency: Shahr-e Kord
- Majority: 129,121

Personal details
- Born: 1959 (age 66–67) Shahr-e Kord, Chaharmahal and Bakhtiari Province, Iran

Morteza Tamaddon Dehkordi (Persian: مرتضی تمدن دهکردی born 1959 in Shahr-e Kord, Iran) is an Iranian politician who served as Governor of Tehran Province from 17 July 2008 to 8 September 2013. He was previously a member of the Parliament from 2004 to 2008.
