= Bahlul Hoseini =

Iranian politician (born 1961)

- بهلول حسینی
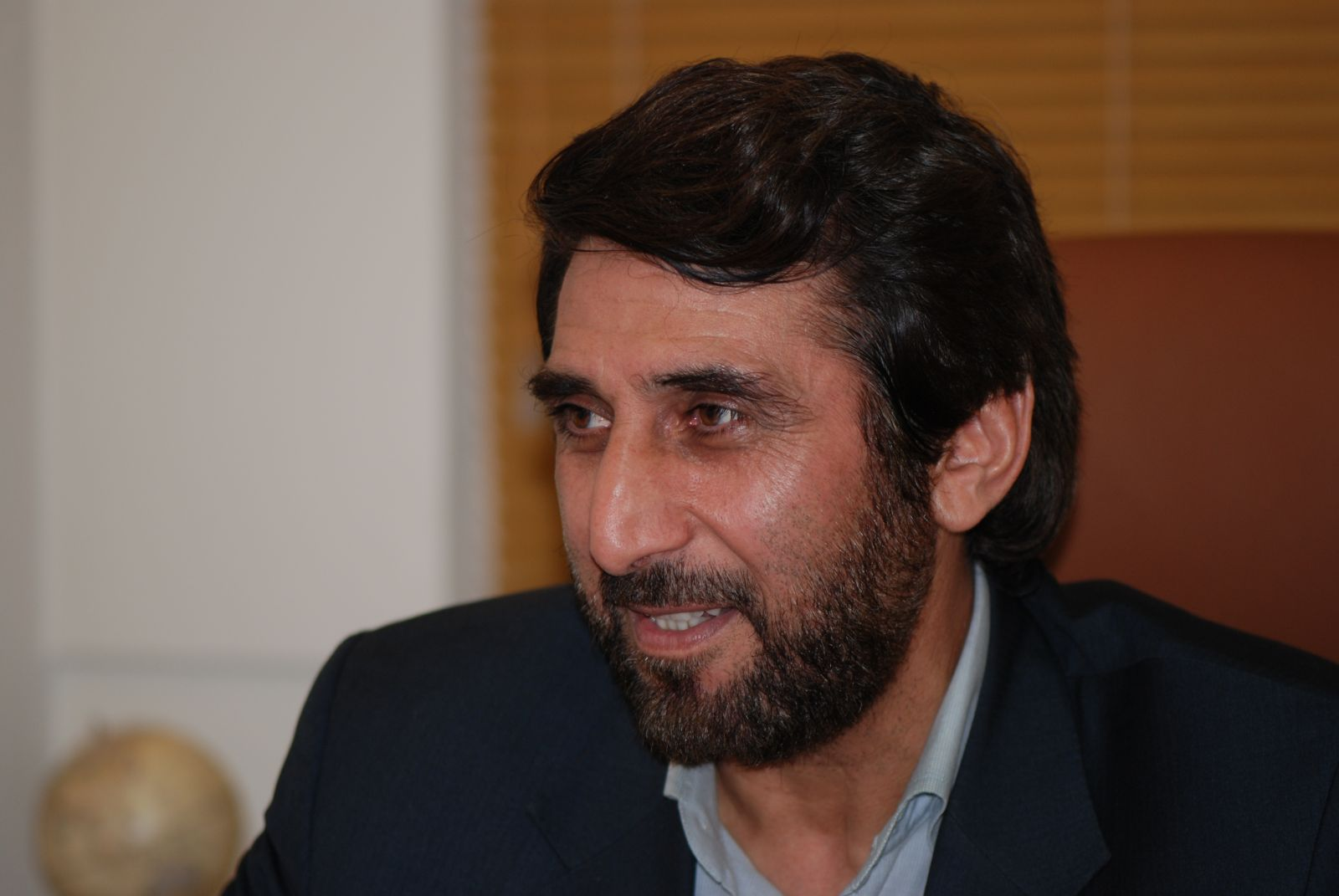

member of Islamic Consultative Assembly
- In office 2004–2008
- Constituency: Mianeh (electoral district)
- In office 2012–2016
- Constituency: Mianeh (electoral district)

Personal details
- Born: 1961; Mianeh, Iran

Bahlul Hoseini (Persian: ‌‌بهلول حسینی; born 1961) is an Iranian politician.

Hoseini was born in Meyaneh. He is a member of the 7th and 9th Islamic Consultative Assembly from the electorate of Meyaneh with Mohammad Ali Madadi. Hoseini won with 25,848 (29.40%) votes.
