= Taghi Khamoushi =

Iranian politician

Member of Parliament of Iran
- In office 24 August 1981 – 28 May 1984
- Constituency: Tehran, Rey and Shemiranat
- Majority: 1,366,980 (52.9%)

Personal details
- Born: Seyed Taghi Seyed Khamoushi; 1937 Tehran, Iran
- Died: 23 March 2006 (aged 69)
- Party: Islamic Coalition Party
- Other political affiliations: Islamic Republican Party (1979–1987)
- Relatives: Alinaghi Khamoushi (brother); Abolhassan Khamoushi (brother)
- Occupation: Businessman

Taghi Sayyid Khamoushi (Persian: تقی خاموشی) was an Iranian bazaari merchant and conservative politician.
