= Alinaghi Khamoushi =

Iranian business magnate

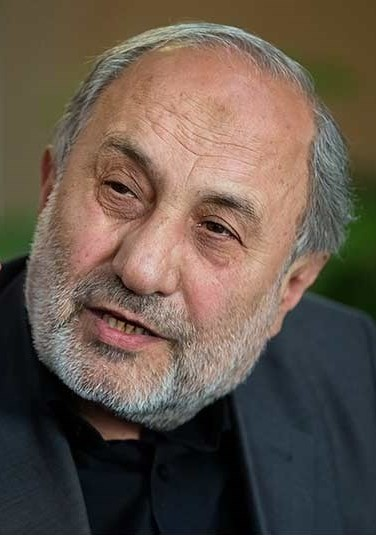
- Portrait of Alinaghi Khamoushi

Member of Parliament of Iran
- In office 28 May 1992 – 28 May 1996
- Constituency: Tehran, Rey, Shemiranat and Eslamshahr
- Majority: 396,395 (38.6%)

Head of Mostazafan Foundation
- In office 5 March 1979 – 17 September 1980
- Appointed by: Ruhollah Khomeini
- Preceded by: Office established
- Succeeded by: Mohammad-Ali Rajai

Personal details
- Born: Seyed Ali Naghi Seyed Khamoushi; 1939 (age 86–87) Tehran, Iran
- Party: Islamic Coalition Party
- Relatives: Abolhassan Khamoushi (brother); Taghi Khamoushi (brother)
- Education: Blackburn College
- Occupation: Businessman
- Profession: Textile engineer

Alinaghi Khamoushi (Persian: علینقی‌ خاموشی, romanized: ʿAli-Naqi Ḵāmuši) is an Iranian business magnate and conservative politician.

An influential lobbyist in Iranian political and economic arena, he is a senior member of the Islamic Coalition Party and runs three large textile companies owned by two religious centers and the CEO of Iran Investments Company.

Khamoushi served as the president of the Iran Chamber of Commerce Industries and Mines from 1984 to 2007. He also represented Tehran, Rey, Shemiranat and Eslamshahr electoral district in the Parliament of Iran from 1992 to 1996. Khamoushi was the first head of Mostazafan Foundation, a Bonyad.

== External linlks ==
- Profile at Bloomberg.com

Business positions
Preceded by Enayat Behbahani	Head of the Iran Chamber of Commerce Industries and Mines; 1979–2007	Succeeded by Mohammad Nahavandian
Government offices
New title Organization established	Head of the Mostazafan Foundation; 1979–1980	Succeeded by Mohammad-Ali Rajai
