= Hamid Bovard =

Iranian politician

- حمید بورد

Minister of Petroleum Acting
- Incumbent
- Assumed office 4 October 2026
- President: Masoud Pezeshkian
- Preceded by: Mohsen Paknejad

Deputy Minister of Petroleum
- In office 29 August 2024 – 7 October 2026
- Minister: Mohsen Paknejad
- Preceded by: Mohsen Khojastehmehr
- Succeeded by: Farrokh Alikhani

Personal details
- Born: March 27, 1964 (age 62) Shushtar, Iran
- Nickname: Hamid Boord

Hamid Bovard (born 27 March 1964) is an Iranian politician and CEO who serves as the Acting Minister of Petroleum of Iran since 4 October 2026. He was former CEO of the National Iranian Oil Company and Deputy Minister of Petroleum of Iran from August 2024 to October 2026.

On 4 October 2026, President Masoud Pezeshkian appointed Bovard as Acting Minister of Petroleum after the approved resignation of Mohsen Paknejad. Bovard is sanctioned by the United States and Ukraine.
