= Javad Owji =

Iranian engineer and politician (born 1966)

- جواد اوجی
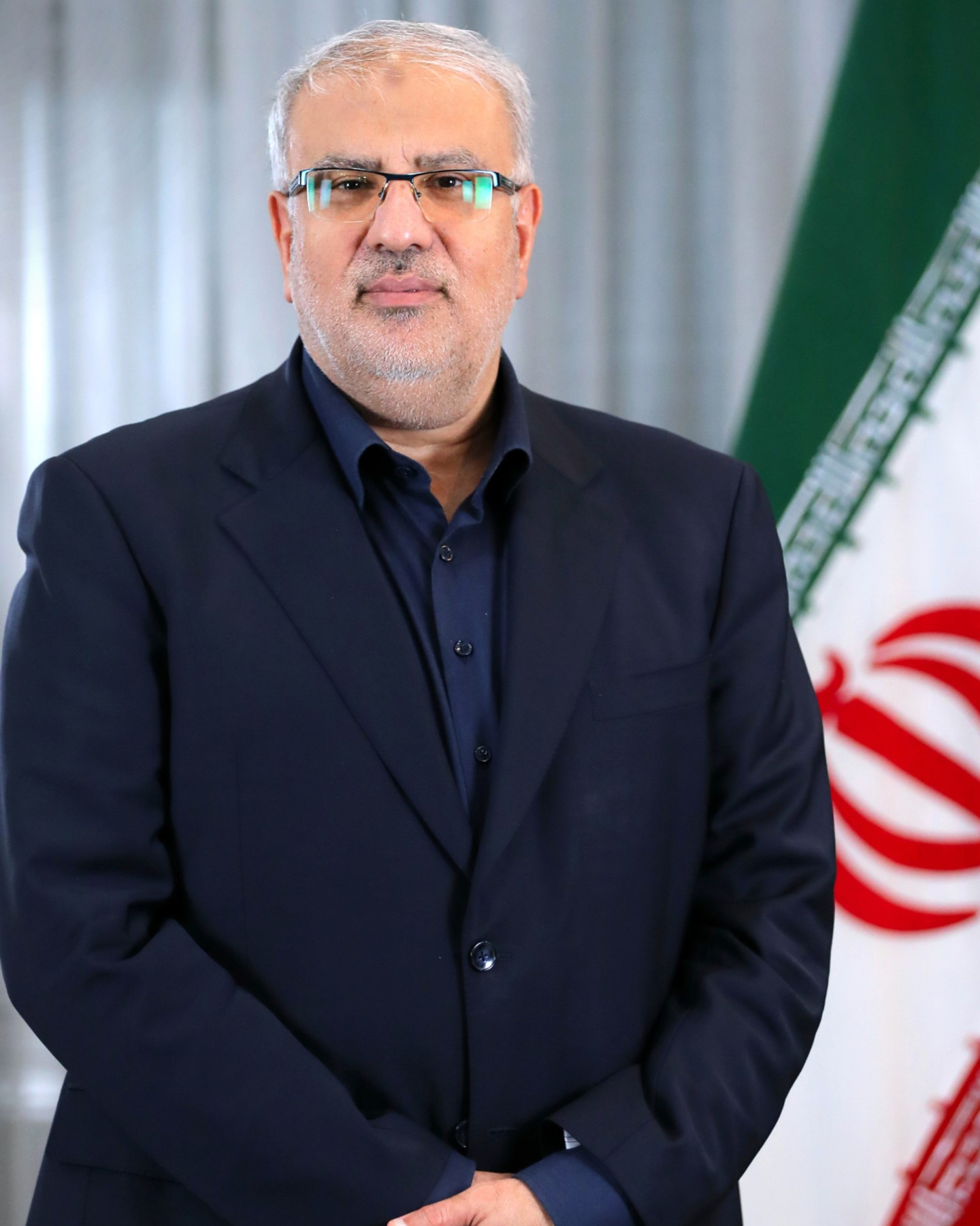
- Owji in 2023

Minister of Petroleum
- In office 25 August 2021 – 21 August 2024
- President: Ebrahim Raisi; Mohammad Mokhber (acting)
- Preceded by: Bijan Namdar Zangeneh
- Succeeded by: Mohsen Paknejad

CEO of National Iranian Gas Company
- In office 2009–2013
- Preceded by: Reza Kasaee-zadeh
- Succeeded by: Hamid-Reza Eraghi

Personal details
- Born: 24 July 1966 (age 60) Shiraz, Iran
- Education: Petroleum University of Technology
- Occupation: Engineer

Javad Owji (Persian: جواد اوجی; born 24 July 1966) is an Iranian oil engineer and politician who served as the Minister of Petroleum of Iran from 2021 to 2024.

== Early life and education ==
Owji was born in Shiraz in 1966. He received a bachelor's degree in oil engineering from Petroleum University of Technology in Ahvaz.

== Career ==
From 1980 Owji worked in the oil-related public offices. He was the deputy oil minister and the head of the National Iranian Gas Company from 2009 to 2013 during the last term of President Mahmoud Ahmadinejad. He also served in various oil-related posts, including chairman of the board of supervision of production and gas refineries and vice chairman of Petro Mofid Oil and Gas Development Holding. Owji was nominated by President Ebrahim Raisi as oil minister on 11 August 2021. On 25 August Owji was confirmed by the Majlis with 198 to 70 with 18 abstentions. He succeeded Bijan Namdar Zangeneh in the post.
