= Gholam-Hossein Nozari =

Iranian politician

Gholam Hossein Nozari

Minister of Petroleum
- In office 14 November 2007 – 3 September 2009; Acting: 12 August – 14 November 2007
- President: Mahmoud Ahmedinejad
- Preceded by: Kazem Vaziri Hamaneh
- Succeeded by: Masoud Mir Kazemi

CEO of National Iranian Oil Company
- In office 5 December 2005 – 9 August 2007
- Minister: Kazem Vaziri Hamaneh
- Preceded by: Mehdi Mir Moazi
- Succeeded by: Seifollah Jashnsaz

Member of the Parliament of Iran
- In office 3 May 1992 – 3 May 2000
- Constituency: Kazeroon
- Majority: 83,070 (44.50%)

Personal details
- Born: 1954 (age 71–72) Kazerun, Iran
- Party: Islamic Republican Party
- Education: Shahid Chamran University; Tehran University

Gholam Hossein Nozari (Persian: غلامحسین نوذری; born 1954) is a conservative Iranian politician who served as oil minister from 2007 to 2009. He was nominated secretary general of the OPEC in June 2012.

== Early life and education ==
Nozari was born in Kazeroon, Iran, in 1954. He studied petroleum and earth science engineering at Shahid Chamran University. He received a master's degree in industrial management from Tehran University.

== Career ==
Nozari worked at the National Iranian Oil Company (NIOC). Then he became a member of the fourth Majlis and acted as deputy chairman of the energy commission. In the fifth Majlis, he was a member of the development commission. He has been a member of the central council of the Islamic Republic Party (South Labor Branch). He also served as the member of ad hoc Majlis committee on budget and chairman of assembly of Fars province deputies. He was appointed managing director of the NIOC in March 2006. He was also appointed deputy oil minister.

In August 2007, then oil minister Kazem Vaziri Hamaned was removed by president Mahmoud Ahmedinejad and Nozari was appointed acting oil minister. Then Nazari was named as oil minister by Ahmedinejad, and he was in office from 2007 to 2009. His appointment allowed Ahmedinejad to exert much more control over the oil sector in Iran. In June 2012, Iran nominated Nozari for the secretary-general of OPEC.

Political offices
Preceded by Kazem Vaziri Hamaneh	Minister of Petroleum of Iran; 2007–2009	Succeeded by Masoud Mir Kazemi
