= Mohammad Ali Madadi =

Iranian politician (born 1959)

- محمدعلی مددی

member of Islamic Consultative Assembly
- In office 2012–2016
- Constituency: Mianeh (electoral district)

Personal details
- Born: 1959; Mianeh, Iran

Mohammad Ali Madadi (Persian: ‌‌محمدعلی مددی; born 1959) is an Iranian politician.

Madadi was born in Meyaneh. He is a member of the 9th Islamic Consultative Assembly from the electorate of Meyaneh with Bahlul Hoseini. Madadi won with 44,855 (50.97%) votes.
