= National Iranian Oil Refining and Distribution Company =

Part of the Ministry of Petroleum of Iran

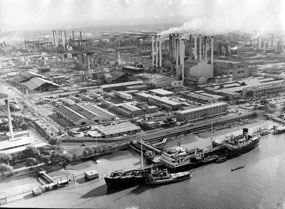
Iran's Abadan Refinery, built 1913.

National Iranian Oil Refining and Distribution Company (NIORDC) is part of the Ministry of Petroleum of Iran. NIORDC was established on 8 March 1991 and undertook to perform all operations relating to refining and distribution of oil products.

== Responsibilities and duties (as of 2009) ==
- Refining crude oil and producing a variety of oil products.
- Transferring crude oil from production bases and “Khazar Terminal” to the refineries and also transferring oil products from refineries and import bases to distribution procurement depots and distribution centres.
- Performing all refining projects and schemes, transfer and storing.
- Production, transfer and distribution of 250 million litres (66,000,000 US gallons; 55,000,000 imperial gallons) of oil products per day.
- Daily export of around 60 million litres (16,000,000 US gallons; 13,000,000 imperial gallons) of oil products abroad via oil terminals.
- Providing different sectors – industry, agriculture and power plants – with fuel and feed regularly e.g. petrochemical complexes.
- Providing consuming fuel to residential sector, business sector in urban and the peasantry communities all over the country.
- Providing more than 7 million vehicles – heavy and light – in the transportation sector with their required daily fuel.

== Installations and capabilities ==
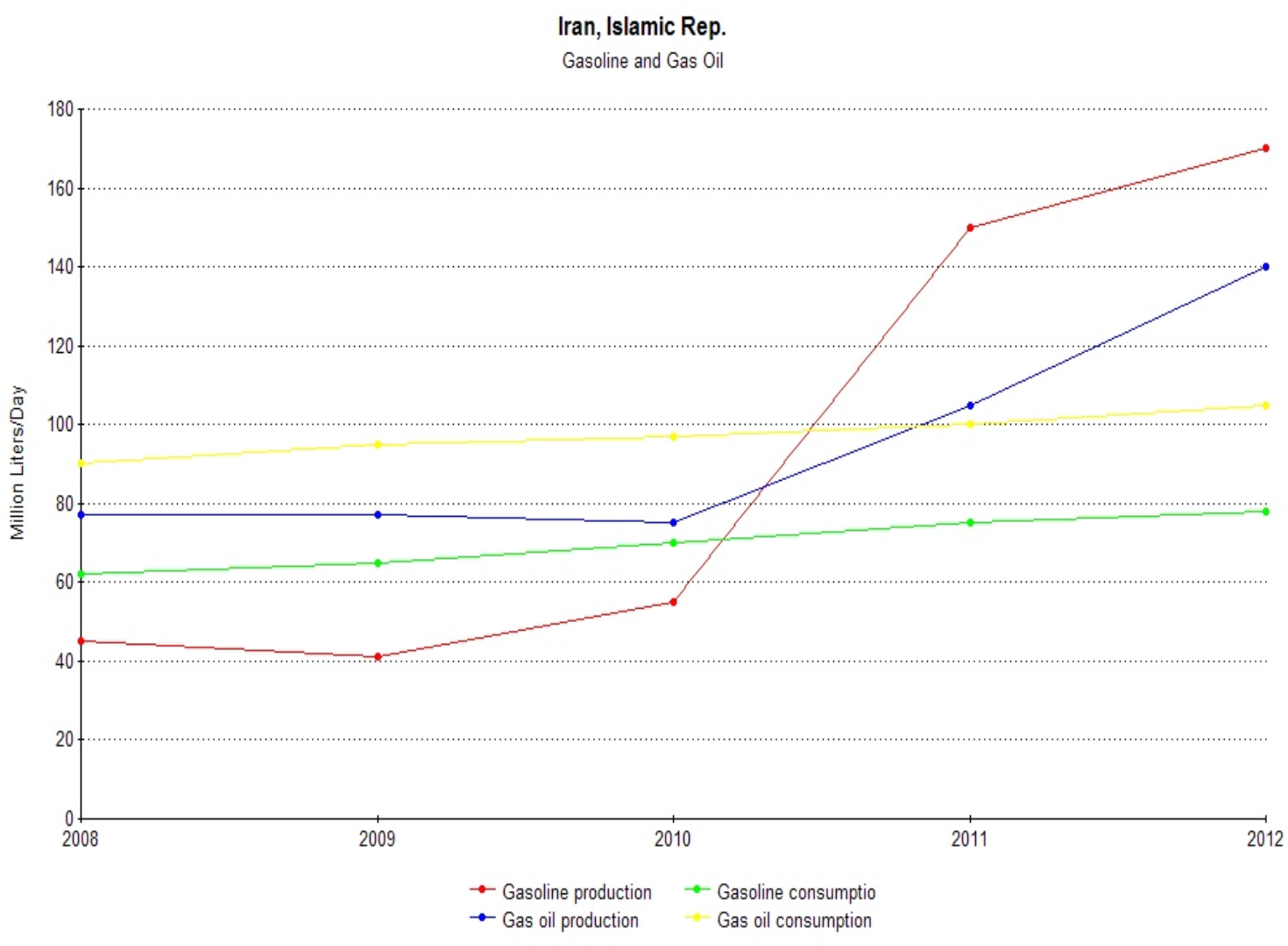
Iran's gasoline and gas-oil production and consumption projection (2008-2012)

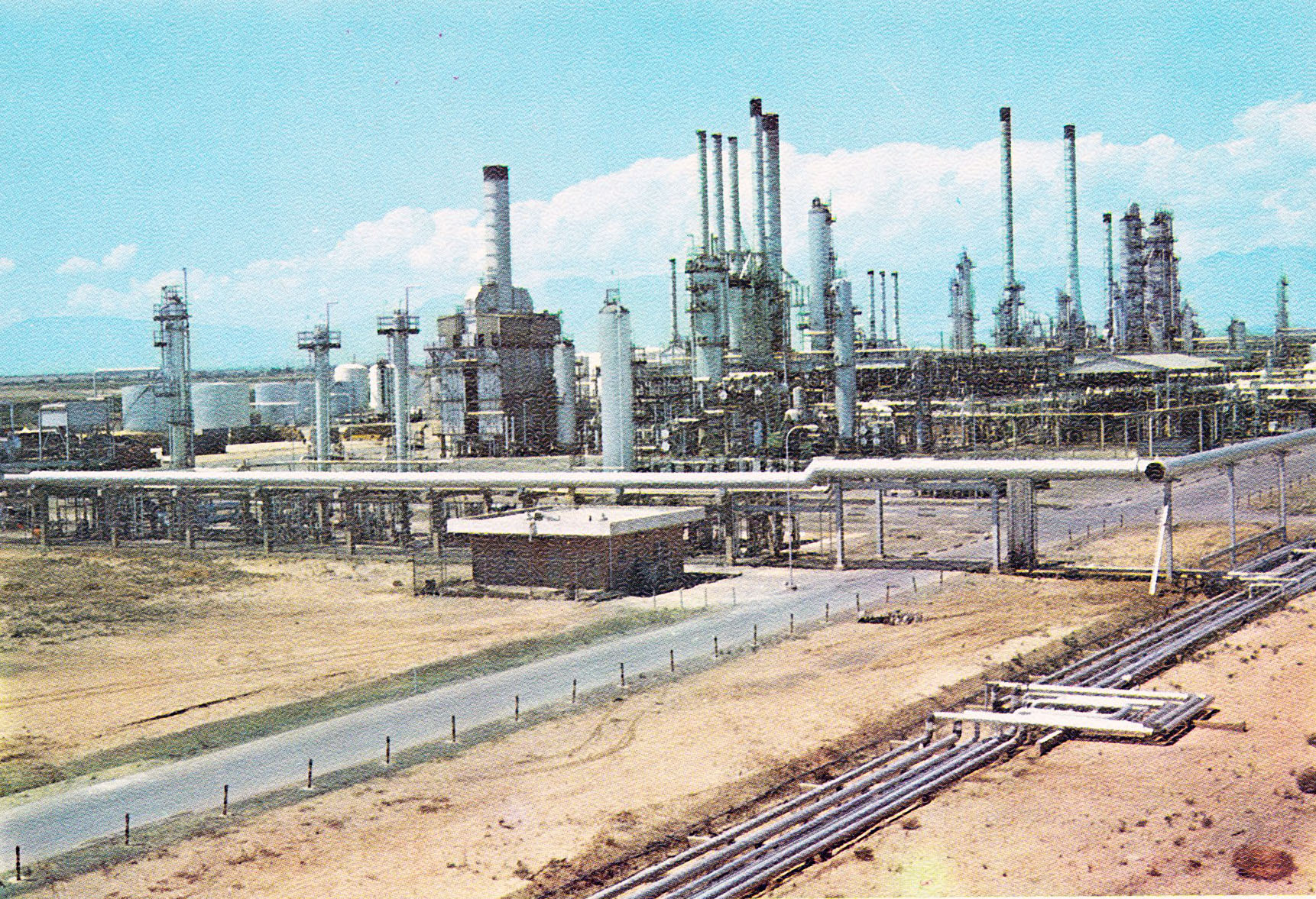
Tehran Oil Refinery

As of 2010, NIORDC had 19 subsidiaries and affiliated companies, including 9 oil existing refineries. Between 2007 and 2012, oil refining capacity for crude oil and gas condensate would increase from 1,600,000 barrels per day (250,000 m^{3}/d) to 3,300,000 barrels per day (520,000 m^{3}/d). By 2009, Iran had a total refining capacity of 1,860,000 barrels per day (296,000 m^{3}/d).

Crude Oil Refining capacity (2009) (in process of being upgraded)
Refinery	Installed Capacity (bbl/d)
Abadan	350,000
Isfahan	280,000
Arak (Imam-Khomeini)	250,000
Bandar Abbas	230,000
Tehran (Shahid Tondgouyan)	220,000 (Euro 5 compliant by 2012)
Arvand Oil Refinery	120,000
Lavan Island	63,000 (Since 2012)
Tabriz	100
Kermanshah	40
Shiraz	30
Total:	1.45 Mbbl/d (231,000 m^{3}/d).

Present Refinery Products - 2007
Oil Products	KBPD (thousand barrel per day)	Percent
Gasoline	283	17%
Gas oil	511	32%
Kerosene (Jet fuel)	136	8%
Fuel oil	457	29%
LPG	50	3%
Others	184	11%

Other facilities:

- Fourteen thousand kilometers of crude oil and oil product transfer pipelines.
- 150 pumping stations.
- Oil industry telecommunication network.
- Operational zones for pipelines and telecommunication.
- 35 operational zones for NIOPDC.
- 220 operational areas for NIOPDC.
- Storage tank installations with 10 billion litres (2.6×10^{9} US gallons; 2.2×10^{9} imperial gallons) capacity (2009). As of 2010, the storage capacity of oil products in the country was around 11.5 billion litres (3.0×10^{9} US gallons; 2.5×10^{9} imperial gallons).

== Fuel imports ==
Major gasoline suppliers to Iran historically have been India, Turkmenistan, Azerbaijan, the Netherlands, France, Singapore, and the United Arab Emirates. The Financial Times reported that Vitol, Glencore, Trafigura and other (western) companies had since stopped supplying petrol to Iran because of international sanctions. In 2006, Vitol, a MNC based in Switzerland, supplied Iran with 60% of its total gasoline cargo imports.

- Average daily gasoline consumption stood at 73 million litres (19,000,000 US gallons; 16,000,000 imperial gallons) in 2006 but fell to 64 million litres (17,000,000 US gallons; 14,000,000 imperial gallons) per day in 2007 concurrent with gasoline rationing plan and to 61 million litres (16,000,000 US gallons; 13,000,000 imperial gallons) after the full implementation of the first phase of the subsidy reforms plan. Gasoline production would reach 70 million litres (18,000,000 US gallons; 15,000,000 imperial gallons) per day in 2013.
- In 2008 Iran has imported nearly 40% of its market needs because of lack of refining capacity and contraband.
- In 2009, Iran spent paid $11 billion on imported fuel. In 2010, gasoline import declined to 30% of its market needs at 25 million litres (6,600,000 US gallons; 5,500,000 imperial gallons) of gasoline and 11 million litres (2,900,000 US gallons; 2,400,000 imperial gallons) of diesel fuel per day.
- In September 2010, Iran claimed that it has stopped importing gasoline according to the domestic capacity expansion plans. This statement was later denied by the government of Hassan Rouhani.
- As of July 2010, Iran produces between 280,000 barrels (45,000 m^{3}) and 285,000 barrels (45,300 m^{3}) of gasoline a day and until recently had acquired the remaining 30 percent, which is about 115,000 barrels per day (18,300 m^{3}/d) to 120,000 barrels per day (19,000 m^{3}/d), through big oil companies.
- In 2014 Iran will import 10–11 million litres (2,600,000–2,900,000 US gallons; 2,200,000–2,400,000 imperial gallons) of gasoline per day overall, including 8–10 million litres (2,100,000–2,600,000 US gallons; 1,800,000–2,200,000 imperial gallons) of premium gasoline from India per day because some of the gasoline produced domestically does not meet the Euro-5 quality standards (and also because of the fuel smuggling/price differential with neighboring countries.)
- In 2016, fuel imports decreased 50% to about 4 million litres (1,100,000 US gallons; 880,000 imperial gallons) per day on average thanks to falling oil prices (i.e. falling price differential with neighboring countries and consequent fall in the smuggling activity).

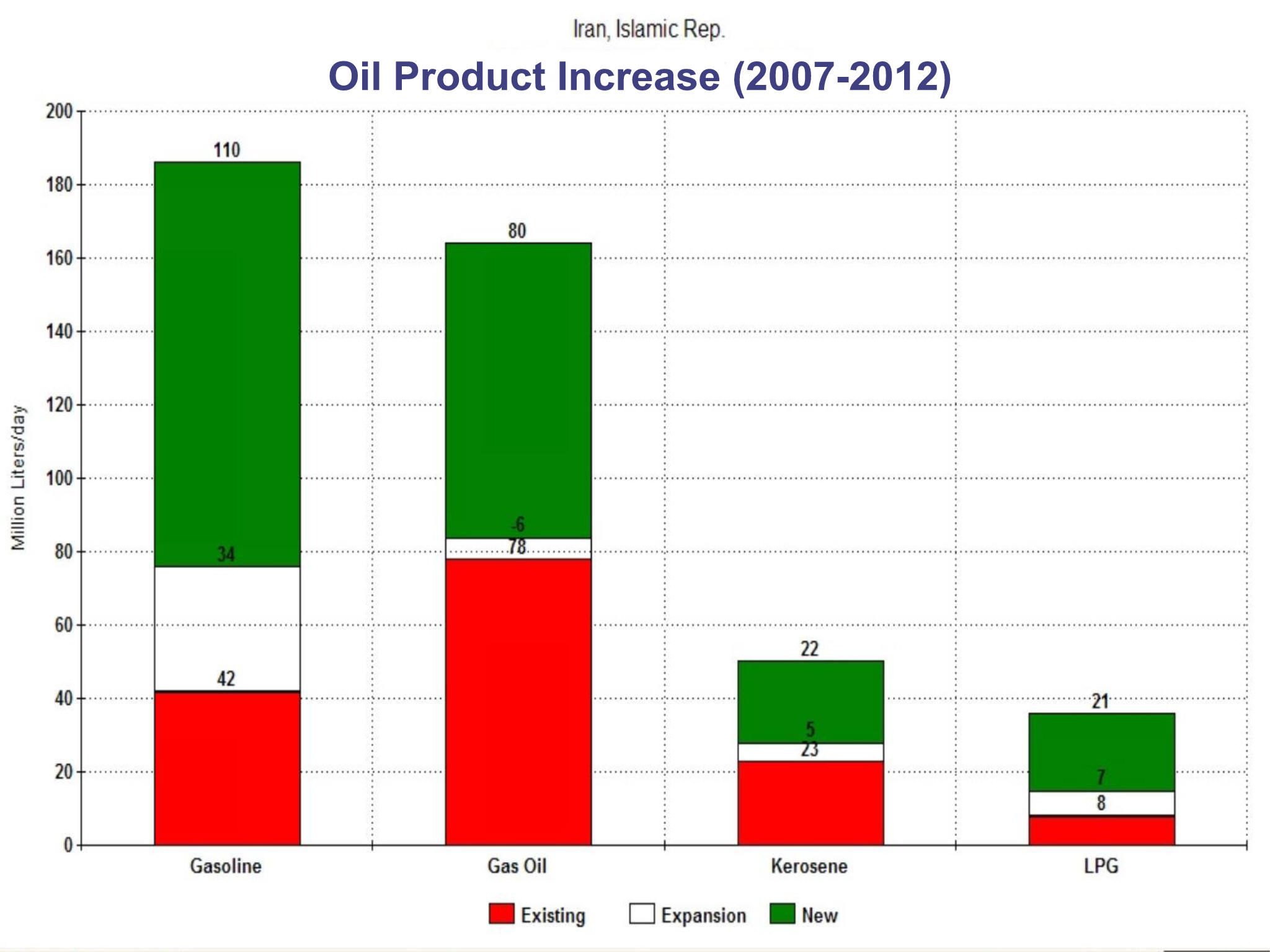
Oil product increase projection for gasoline, gas-oil, kerosene, LPG (2007-2012)

Iran: Company (Country) Source of Gasoline Imports
2008	2009
BP (UK)	CNPC (China)
ENOC (UAE)	Glencore (Switzerland)
Glencore (Switzerland)	IPG (Kuwait)
IPG (Kuwait)	Litasco (Russia)
MEP (UAE)	Petronas (Malaysia)
Reliance Industries (India)	Reliance Industries (India)
Shell (Netherlands)	Shell (Netherlands)
SPC (Singapore)	Total (France)
Total (France)	Trafigura (Switzerland)
Trafigura (Switzerland)	Vitol (Switzerland)
Vitol (Switzerland)	Zhenhua Oil (China)

== New facilities ==
While the country remains dependent on small gasoline and diesel imports, net gasoline imports in 2013 averaged only 33 000 bpd. This compares to refined product imports of 182 000 bpd in 2009, of which two thirds was gasoline (approximately 132 000 bpd).

New Planned Refineries by the public sector (as at 2010)
Refinery	Location	Refining capacity	Estimated costs	Estimated completion date
Khuzestan refinery (privately owned)	Arvand Free Zone, near Abadan	180,000 barrels per day (29,000 m^{3}/d). The refinery will refine the heavy crude oil produced in Azadegan and Yadavaran oil fields. It will also produce 10 million litres (2,600,000 US gallons; 2,200,000 imperial gallons) of super gasoline complying with Euro IV standard, 12.6 million litres (3,300,000 US gal; 2,800,000 imp gal) of diesel oil, 3 million litres (790,000 US gal; 660,000 imp gal) of jet fuel, 5 million litres (1,300,000 US gal; 1,100,000 imp gal) of liquefied gas, and 440 tonnes (430 long tons; 490 short tons) of sulfur.	2.9 billion euros	2012
The Persian Gulf Star refinery	Assalouyeh	360,000 of gas condensates per day and to produce gasoline, jet fuel, and other valuable products.	2.5 billion euros	2010
Shahriar refinery	Tabriz	150,000 barrels per day (24,000 m^{3}/d); gasoline production: 70,000 barrels per day (11,000 m^{3}/d)	1.2 billion euros	2012
Anahita refinery	Kermanshah Province	150,000 barrels per day (24,000 m^{3}/d)	1.3 billion euros	2012
Hormoz refinery	Bandar Abbas	300,000 barrels (48,000 m^{3}) of heavy and extra heavy crude oil	$4.3 billion	2012
Caspian refinery	Gorgan, Golestan Province	300,000 barrels (48,000 m^{3}) of crude oil; 20 million litres (5,300,000 US gal; 4,400,000 imp gal) of gasoline, 11 million litres (2,900,000 US gal; 2,400,000 imp gal) of gas oil from Caspian Sea countries with exports to Turkey, Afghanistan and Pakistan	$4 billion	2013
Pars refinery	Shiraz	120,000 barrels per day (19,000 m^{3}/d)	800 million euros	2012

New Planned Refineries by the private sector (as at 2010)
Refinery	Location	Refining capacity	Estimated costs	Completion date
Yasouj refinery	Yasouj	150,000 barrels per day (24,000 m^{3}/d). The refinery will produce petrol, gasoil, kerosene, furnace oil, liquefied gas, asphalt, and sulfur.	$2.2 billion	2014

Planned in 2011, Qeshm refinery (capable of processing heavy crude oil) will have an output capacity of 30,000 barrels a day of light oil products and will become operational by 2014.

== Subsidiary companies ==
The NIORDC subsidiaries are as follows:

- National Iranian Oil Products Distribution Co.
- Management of Construction & Development of "CNG" Stations Co.
- National Iranian Oil Engineering and Construction Co. (NIOEC)
- Oil Pipeline and Telecommunication Co.
- Oil Refining Co.

== See also ==
- The nationalization of the Iran oil industry movement
- Petroleum industry in Iran
- Abadan Refinery
- Arvand oil refinery
- List of oil refineries
- 2007 Gas Rationing Plan in Iran
- National Iranian Oil Company
- Jey Oil Refining Company
