= Kazem Vaziri Hamaneh =

Iranian engineer (born 1945)

Minister of Petroleum
- In office 11 December 2005 – 12 August 2007; Acting: 29 August – 11 December 2005
- President: Mahmoud Ahmedinejad
- Preceded by: Bijan Namdar Zangeneh
- Succeeded by: Gholam-Hossein Nozari

Personal details
- Born: 1945 (age 80–81) Yazd, Imperial State of Iran
- Education: Amir Kabir University

Military service
- Allegiance: Iran
- Branch/service: Ground Force
- Years of service: 1970–1971
- Unit: Engineering Corps

Seyyed Kazem Vaziri Hamaneh (Persian: سید کاظم وزیری هامانه; born 1945) is an Iranian engineer who served as oil minister from 2005 to 2007.

== Early life and education ==
Hamaneh was born in Yazd in 1945. He holds a mechanical engineering degree, which he received from Polytechnique University. He also received a master's degree in management.

== Career and activities ==
Hamaneh served as deputy oil minister and acting oil minister until 2005. He was appointed oil minister when Mahmoud Ahmedinejad became president in the elections of 2005. However, Hamaned was nominated as oil minister only after the first three nominees of Ahmedinejad failed to secure backing from the Majlis. Hamaneh was appointed oil minister on 11 December 2007 with the approval of the Majlis. His tenure lasted until August 2007 when he was removed by Ahmedinejad. Then Hamaneh was named as an advisor to President Ahmedinejad on oil and gas affairs.

On 5 July 2012, Hamaneh said Iran would not face any problem in selling crude oil to its customers despite the sanctions applied to oil industry of Iran. Hamaneh was appointed deputy to the oil minister Bijan Namdar Zanganeh on 3 September 2013.

Political offices
Preceded by Bijan Namdar Zangeneh	Petroleum minister of Iran; 2005–2007	Succeeded by Gholam Hossein Nozari
