= Ministry of Petroleum (Iran) =

Government ministry of Iran

Coordinates: 35°42′25.85″N 51°24′41.91″E

- وزارت نفت; Vezârat-e Naft
- Flag of the Ministry of Petroleum

Agency overview
- Formed: 29 September 1979; 47 years ago
- Jurisdiction: Government of the Islamic Republic of Iran
- Headquarters: Tehran, Iran
- Employees: 104,373 (2019)
- Minister responsible: Hamid Bovard (Acting)
- Child agencies: *NIOC; *NIPC; *NIGC; *NIORDC
- Website: www.mop.ir

Footnotes
- Official MoP Youtube channel

The Ministry of Petroleum (MOP) (Persian: وزارت نفت, romanized: Vezârat-e Naft) manages all aspects of the Iranian oil industry, including the discovery, extraction, production, distribution, and importation and exportation of crude oil and petrochemical products. The Ministry has been sanctioned by the United States Department of State since 2020.

According to BP, Iran has 137.6 billion barrels (2.188×10^{10} m^{3}) of proven oil reserves and 29.61 trillion cubic meters of proven gas reserves. Iran ranks third in the world in oil reserves and second in gas reserves. It is responsible for applying the principle of Iranian ownership and sovereignty over oil and gas reserves. Also, it is undertake the separation of sovereignty tasks from management and development of country's oil and gas industry.

The Ministry was established after revolution in Iran and in the interim government of Bazargan, after departure of Hasan Nazia, the managing director of National Iranian Oil Company from the country in 1979. The organizational structure of this ministry consists of a central headquarters and four subsidiaries, including National Iranian Oil Company, National Iranian Gas Company, National Iranian Petrochemical Company and National Iranian Oil Refining and Distribution Company. It monitors the operations of exploration, extraction, marketing and sale of crude oil, natural gas and oil products in the country through its subsidiaries. In addition to meeting its major energy needs, the ministry supplies over 80% of foreign currency earnings by exporting crude oil and refined petroleum products.

According to the Fourth Economic, Social and Cultural Development Plan, the Government has been required to transfer at least 10% of the activities related to the exploration, extraction and production of crude oil to the private sector, while in the meantime retaining its ownership of oil resources. This is also the case in other fields of the Ministry of Petroleum's activities.

Iran plans to invest $500 billion in the oil sector until 2025. As of 2010, US$70 billion worth of oil and gas projects were under construction. Iran's annual oil and gas revenues were expected to reach $250 billion by 2015.

== History ==
The Islamic Republic of Iran formed the Ministry with the aim of applying the principle of Iranian national ownership and sovereignty to oil and gas resources, and separating sovereignty functions from company in the management and development of oil and gas industry of the country. Since the petroleum industry has a special role in the country's economy as a propellant industry and plays a key role in achieving the major goals of national economy, the ministry's performance is very important.

Iran holds 836.47 billion barrels of liquid hydrocarbon reserves (crude oil, liquids and gas condensate) and about 34 trillion gas reserves. It is ranked first in the world in terms of total hydrocarbon reserves and energy security. Also, the privileges like geopolitical position of the country and availability of powerful human capital have given it more strength.

The National Petroleum Procurement Proposal was signed by 17 representatives of the National Petroleum Commission on 8 December 1950. In the text of message was following: "we are proposing for Iranian oil industry to be announced in all regions of the country without exception under the name of well-being of Iranian people and in order to contribute to peace of the world: all exploration, extraction and exploitation operations be in the control of government."

Following the announcement of this proposal, "the law of oil Nationalization throughout the country and two-month extension to Petroleum Commission to study around implementation of this principle" passed in National Assembly and eventually in the Senate on 29 March 1950. Thus, The National Iranian Oil Company was established.

The first board of directors of the National Iranian Oil Company was constituted by implementing the law of oil industry nationalization and after expropriation of former British oil company in June 1951. Then, new rules were adopted for this new company.

The legal framework for activities of the National Iranian Oil Company in discussion of hydrocarbons sources and its products was determined by approving the "Law on Development of Petrochemical Industries (with subsequent amendments)" on 20 July 1965 and the "Law on Development of Gas Industry" on 25 May 1972. In addition, the extent of Iranian or foreign companies and firms has clarified to participate in petrochemical product plans.

Finally, a detailed description of presenting and receiving proposals, signing contracts, contract termination, conservation and preventing environmental pollution, maintaining Iran's interests and pricing conditions were presented by the approval of first "Oil Act" on 8 August 1974, in addition to defining the terms and conditions of work within hydrocarbon resources of whole country.

Upon approval of first "Oil Act", the "Law on Statute of National Iranian Oil Company" was ratified in five seasons on 17 May 1977.

"General and capital", "subject, duties, rights and authorities of company", "the entity of company", "balance sheet and profit and loss account" have formed first four chapters of the statute. In the fifth chapter of this law is also addressed to "other regulations".

Subsequently, the "Statute of National Petrochemical Company" and "Statute of National Iranian Gas Company" were approved on 21 November, and 25 November 1977, respectively.

After Islamic Revolution of Iran, the editing and approval of new laws were also on the agenda of Islamic Consultative Assembly with the necessity of following some principles and with regard to departure of foreign experts. Hence, new oil law was approved on 9 October 1987.

== Oil law ==
Following the announcement of this proposal, "the law of oil Nationalization throughout the country and two-month extension to Petroleum Commission to study around implementation of this principle" passed in National Assembly and eventually in the Senate on 29 March 1950. Thus, The National Iranian Oil Company was established.

First board of directors of National Iranian Oil Company was constituted by implementing the law of oil industry nationalization and after expropriation of former British oil company in June 1951. Then, new rules were adopted for this new company.

The legal framework for activities of National Iranian Oil Company in discussion of hydrocarbons sources and its products was determined by approving the "Law on Development of Petrochemical Industries (with subsequent amendments)" on 20 July 1965 and the "Law on Development of Gas Industry" on 25 May 1972. In addition, the extent of Iranian or foreign companies and firms has clarified to participate in petrochemical product plans.

Finally, a detailed description of presenting and receiving proposals, signing contracts, contract termination, conservation and preventing environmental pollution, maintaining Iran's interests and pricing conditions were presented by the approval of first "Oil Act" on 8 August 1974, in addition to defining the terms and conditions of work within hydrocarbon resources of whole country.

Upon approval of first "Oil Act", the "Law on Statute of National Iranian Oil Company" was ratified in five seasons on 17 May 1977.

"General and capital", "subject, duties, rights and authorities of company", "the entity of company", "balance sheet and profit and loss account" have formed first four chapters of the statute. In the fifth chapter of this law is also addressed to "other regulations".

Subsequently, the "Statute of National Petrochemical Company" and "Statute of National Iranian Gas Company" were approved on 21 November, and 25 November 1977, respectively.

After Islamic Revolution of Iran, the editing and approval of new laws were also on the agenda of Islamic Consultative Assembly with the necessity of following some principles and with regard to departure of foreign experts. Hence, new oil law was approved on 9 October 1987.

== Ministers ==
No.	Portrait	Name	Took office	Left office	Party	Head of government
1		Ali Akbar Moinfar	29 September 1979	28 May 1980	Independent	Mehdi Bazargan
2		Mohammad Javad Tondguyan	25 September 1980	17 August 1981	Independent politician	Mohammad-Ali Rajai
3		Mohammad Gharazi	17 August 1981	28 October 1985	Independent	Mohammad-Javad Bahonar
3		Mohammad Gharazi	17 August 1981	28 October 1985	Independent	Mir-Hossein Mousavi
4		Gholam Reza Aghazadeh	28 October 1985	20 August 1997	Islamic Republican Party	Mir-Hossein Mousavi
4		Gholam Reza Aghazadeh	28 October 1985	20 August 1997	Islamic Republican Party	Mir-Hossein Mousavi Akbar Hashemi Rafsanjani
5		Bijan Namdar Zangeneh	20 August 1997	24 August 2005	Executives of Construction Party	Mohammad Khatami
6		Kazem Vaziri Hamaneh	11 December 2005	12 August 2007	Independent	Mahmoud Ahmadinejad
7		Gholam-Hossein Nozari	14 November 2007	3 September 2009	Independent	Mahmoud Ahmadinejad
8		Masoud Mir Kazemi	3 September 2009	16 May 2011	Front of Islamic Revolution Stability	Mahmoud Ahmadinejad
9		Rostam Ghasemi	3 August 2011	15 August 2013	Independent	Mahmoud Ahmadinejad
10		Bijan Namdar Zangeneh	15 August 2013	25 August 2021	Executives of Construction Party	Hassan Rouhani
11		Javad Owji	25 August 2021	21 August 2024	Independent	Ebrahim Raisi

== Constitution ==
The Iranian constitution prohibits the granting of petroleum rights on a concessionary basis or direct equity stake. However, the 1987 Petroleum Law permits the establishment of contracts between the ministry, state companies and "local and foreign national persons and legal entities." Buyback contracts, for instance, are arrangements in which the contractor funds all investments, receives remuneration from the National Iranian Oil Company (NIOC) in the form of an allocated production share, then transfers operation of the field to NIOC after a set number of years, at which time the contract is completed.

Since the 1979 revolution in Iran, the country has been under constant US unilateral sanctions. The first U.S. sanctions against Iran were formalized in November 1979, and during the hostage crisis, many sanctions were leveled against the Iranian government. By 1987 the import of Iranian goods into the United States had been banned. In 1995, President of the United States Bill Clinton issued Executive Order 12957, banning U.S. investment in Iran's energy sector, followed a few weeks later by Executive Order 12959 eliminating all trade and investment and virtually all interaction between the United States and Iran.

Specifically the ministry has been on the sanction list of the European Union since 16 October 2012.

== Fifth Development Plan ==
=== Features of fifth development plan in oil industry ===
The features of fifth development plan in oil industry include: a systemic template of a set of interconnected components that interact with each other to exchange data, information, materials and products, and they perform a targeted move. Also, different parts of the plan have been coordinated and have been seen as a value chain in industry as a whole.

=== The major goals of Iran's oil and gas industry in fifth development plan ===
Objective 1: increase the share and improve position of oil, gas and petrochemical industry in the region and the world, to increase extraction of oil and gas with priority of common fields with neighboring countries, increasing refining capacity

Objective 2: Optimum use of hydrocarbon reserves of the country as backing and stimulus for sustainable economic development of the country.

Objective 3: Use of oil and gas industry capacity to defend national interest

Objective 4: Implement energy management to prevent waste in the country's fuel consumption, reducing energy intensity and granting targeted subsidies

Objective 5: Establishing effective and constructive interaction with energy producer and consumer countries; playing management role of Iran in energy distribution and transit.

Objective 6: Realizing the general policies of article 44 of the constitution in oil industry

Objective 7: Achieve advanced technology in oil, gas and petrochemical industries to reach the second position of science and technology in the region.

Objective 8: Changing the look to oil and gas and its revenues, from source of public funding to "economic productive resources and capitals"

Objective 9: Increase productivity in various sectors of oil industry in order to grow GDP (Gross Domestic Product)

== Subsidiaries ==
=== National Iranian Oil Company ===
National Iranian Oil Company (NIOC) is in charge of oil and gas exploration and production, processing and oil transportation. National Iranian South Oil Company (NISOC) is an important subsidiary of NIOC. NISOC is producing about 83% percent of all crude oil and 16% percent of natural gas produced in Iran.

National Iranian Oil Company subsidiaries:

- National Iranian South Oilfields Company (NISOC)
- Iranian Central Oilfields Company (ICOFC)
- Pars Oil and Gas company
- Petroleum Engineering and Development Co. (PEDEC)
- Iranian Offshore Oil Company

=== National Iranian Gas Company ===
National Iranian Gas Company (NIGC) manages gathering, treatment, processing, transmission, distribution, and exports of gas and gas liquids.

The huge reserves of natural gas put Iran in the second place, in terms of the natural gas reserve quantity, among other countries, only next to the Russian Federation, with an estimate of proven reserve quantity close to 23 bcm. Iran's gas reserves are exploited primarily for domestic use.

=== National Iranian Petrochemical Company ===
National Iranian Petrochemical Company (NPC) handles petrochemical production, distribution, and exports. National Iranian Petrochemical Company's output capacity will increase to over 100 million tpa by 2015 from an estimated 50 million tpa in 2010 thus becoming the world' second largest chemical producer globally after Dow Chemical with Iran housing some of the world's largest chemical complexes.

=== National Iranian Oil Refining and Distribution Company ===
National Iranian Oil Refining and Distribution Company (NIORDC) handles oil refining and transportation, with some overlap to NIOC.

There are eight refineries with a potential capacity of 950,000 barrels per day (151,000 m^{3}/d) and one refinery complex in the country with a total refining capacity of over 15 kbbl/d (2,400 m^{3}/d) (in Tehran, Tabriz, Isfahan, Abadan, Kermanshah, Shiraz, Bandar Abbas, Arak and Lavan Island) and a storage capacity of 8 milliard litre. Abundance of basic material, like natural gas, in the country provide favorable conditions for development and expansion of petrochemical plants.

=== Production companies ===
- National Iranian South Oilfields Company (NISOC)
  - Karoun oil and gas exploitation company
  - Maroun Oil and Gas Company
  - Masjed Soleyman Oil and Gas Company
  - Gachsaran Oil and Gas Company
  - Aghajari exploitation Company
- Iranian Central Oilfields Company (ICOFC)
  - West Gas & Oil exploitation Company
  - East Oil and Gas exploitation Company
  - Southern Zagros Oil and Gas Company
- Iranian Offshore Oil Company
- Pars Oil and Gas company
- Arvandan Oil & Gas Co.

=== Technical Services Companies ===
- National Iranian Drilling Company
- Petroleum Engineering and Development Co.
- Iranian Oil Terminals Company
- Pars Special Economic Zone
- Naftiran Intertrade Company (Nico)
- Iran fuel conservation optimization company

== Revenues from crude oil ==
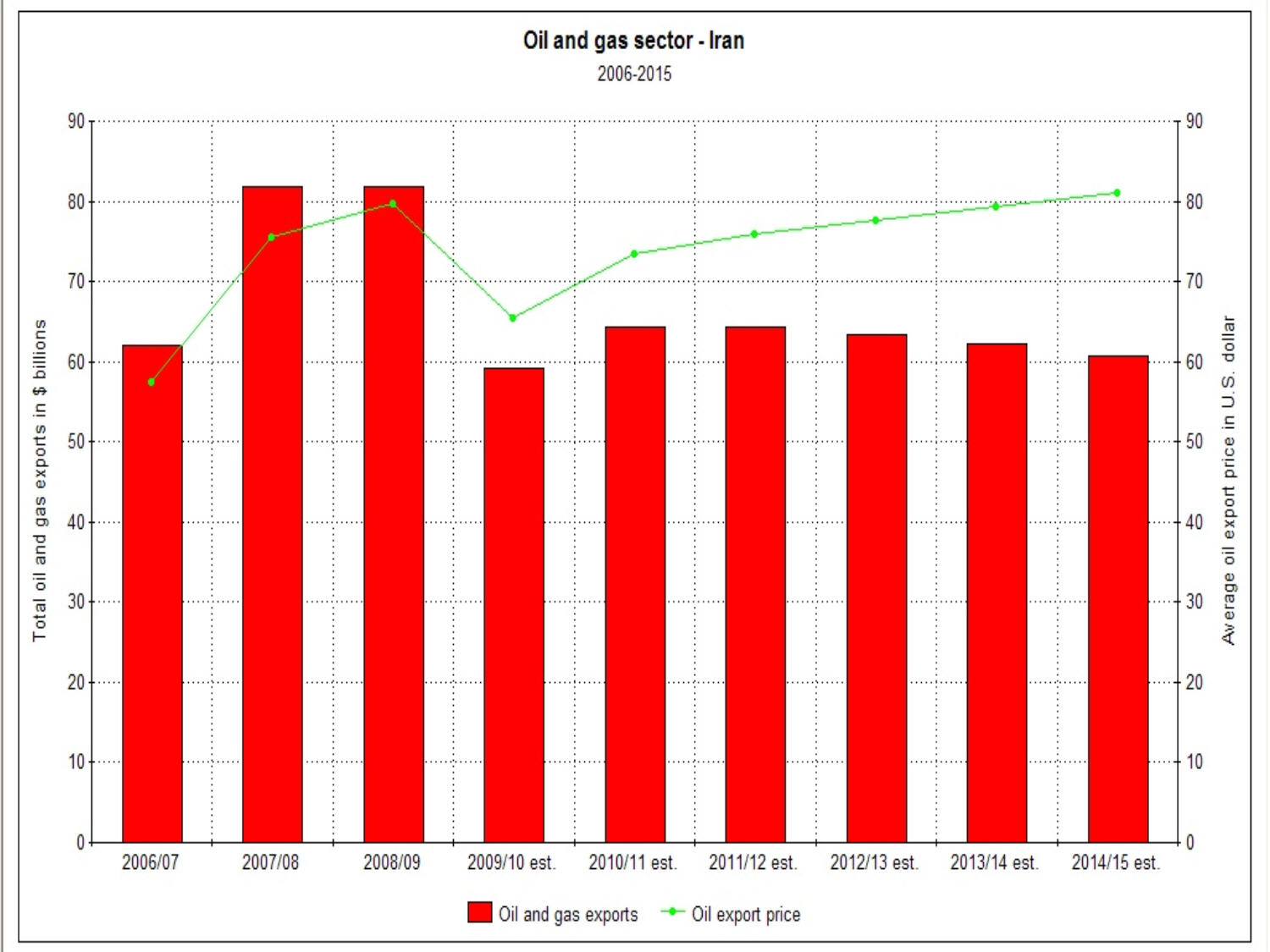
Iran's oil and gas projected revenues chart by the International Monetary Fund. Officials in Iran estimate that Iran's annual oil and gas revenues could reach $250 billion by 2015 once the current projects come on stream.

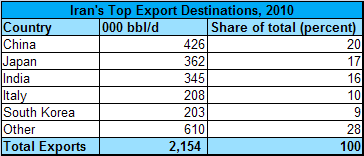
Iran's total revenues from the sale of oil amounted to $77 billion in Iranian year 1387 (2008–09). The average sale price of Iran's crude oil during that year was $100 per barrel. According to the National Iranian Oil Company, Iran's average daily production of crude oil stood at 4 million barrels (640,000 m^{3}) per day. Of this amount, 55% was exported and the remainder was consumed domestically. As of 2010, oil income accounts for 80% of Iran's foreign currency revenues and 60% of the nation's overall budget. Iran exported over 844 million barrels (134,200,000 m^{3}) of oil in the one year to 21 March 2010, averaging around 2.3 million barrels (370,000 m^{3}) a day. The exports included around 259 million barrels (41,200,000 m^{3}) of light crude and more than 473 million barrels (75,200,000 m^{3}) of heavy crude oil. Japan, China, South Africa, Brazil, Pakistan, Sri Lanka, Spain, India and the Netherlands are the main importers of Iran's crude oil. Iran's annual oil revenues reached $100 billion in 2011. Iran's annual oil and gas revenues are expected to reach $250 billion by 2015, including $100 billion from Iran's South Pars giant gas field.

=== Alleged missing oil revenues ===
- Oil revenues: Foreign currency proceeds from crude sales are managed by the Central Bank. According to Farda newspaper, the difference between President Ahmadinejad administration's revenues and the amount deposited with the Central Bank of Iran exceeds $66 billion. This amount is broken down as follows:
1. $35 billion in imported goods (2005–2009),
2. $25 billion in oil revenues (2005–2008),
3. $2.6 billion in non-oil export revenues,
4. $3 billion in foreign exchange reserves.

This is a large number as it is equal one-tenth of Iran's total oil revenues since the 1979 revolution.

== Reserves and production ==
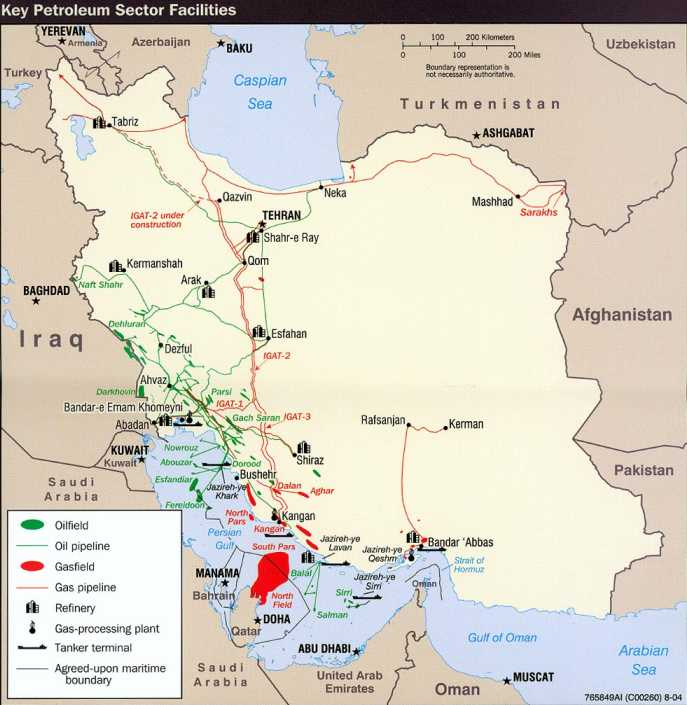
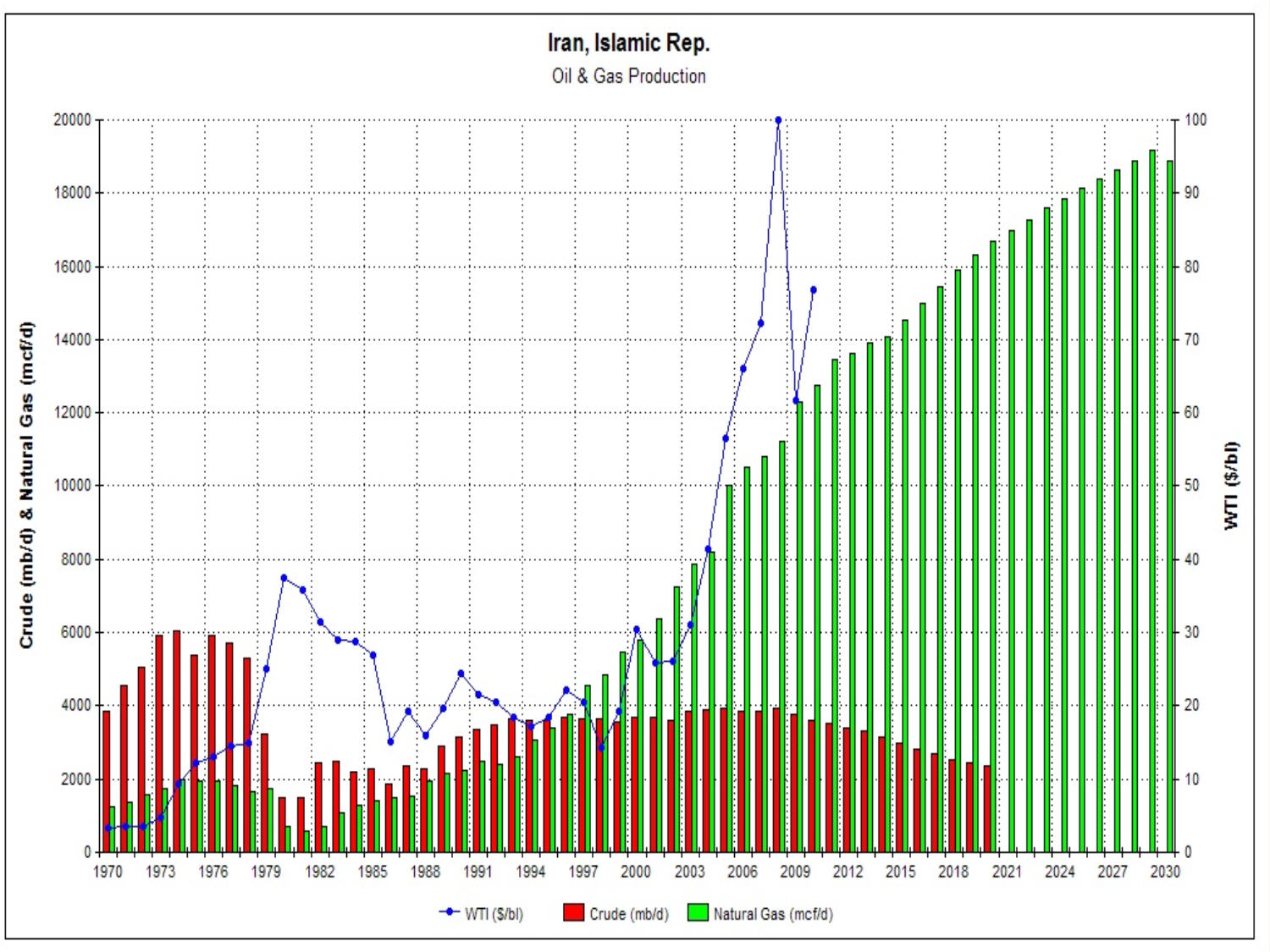

Proven oil reserves
Country	Billions of Barrels
Saudi Arabia	262.7
Canada	178.9
Iran	133.3
Iraq	112.5
United Arab Emirates	97.8
Kuwait	96.5
Venezuela	75.6

Top oil producers
Country	Millions of Barrels
Saudi Arabia	9.5
Russia	9.2
United States	7.6
Iran	4.0
China	3.5
European Union	3.4
Mexico	3.4

== Public projects ==
As of 2012, the Ministry of Petroleum in Iran handles 4,000 public (non-oil) projects across the country. The estimated value of the projects stands at 53,868 trillion rials (approximately $4 trillion).

== Sanctions ==
The Ministry of Petroleum, in accordance with the US Executive Order 13876, was placed under sanctions by the United States Department of State in October 2020 and has been designated as Specially Designated Global Terrorist due to its alleged links with the Islamic Revolutionary Guard Corps for supplying "oil for terror" in Syria worth millions of dollars.

== See also ==
- The nationalization of the Iran oil industry movement
- Petroleum industry in Iran
- Economy of Iran
- International Rankings of Iran in Energy
- Iranian Economic Reform Plan
- Oil megaprojects
