= Guarujá Formation =

Geological formation of the Santos Basin near Brazil

- Stratigraphic range: Early Albian; ~113–108 Ma
- Type: Geological formation
- Unit of: Camburi Group
- Underlies: Itajaí-Açu Fm., Juréia Fm.
- Overlies: Ariri Formation
- Thickness: up to 2,500 m (8,200 ft)

Lithology
- Primary: Limestone
- Other: Marl

Location
- Coordinates: 26°6′S 43°43′W
- Region: Santos Basin, South Atlantic
- Country: Brazil

Type section
- Named for: Guarujá
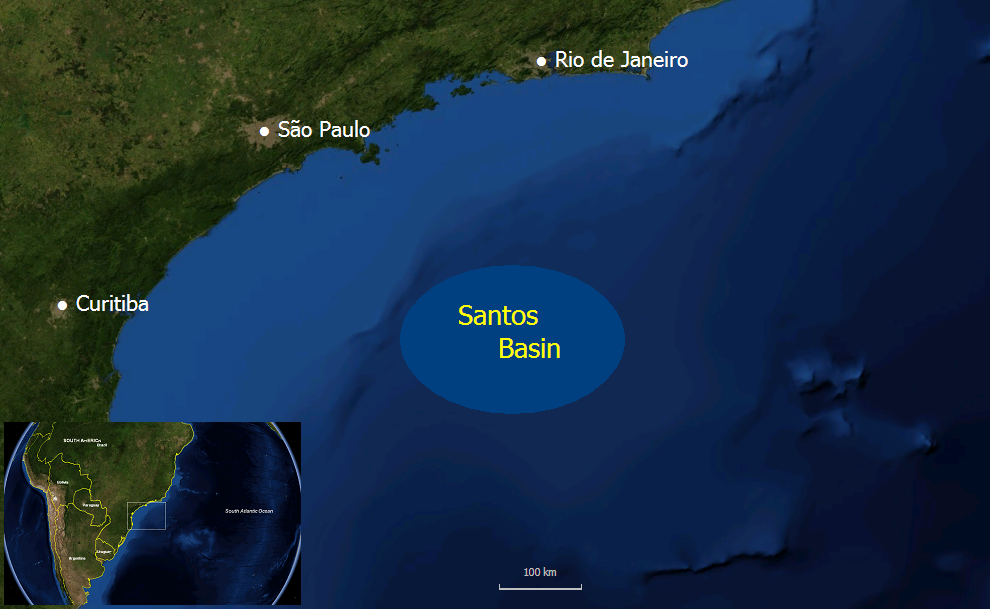
- Location of the Santos Basin

The Guarujá Formation (Portuguese: Formacão Guarujá) is a geological formation of the Santos Basin offshore of the Brazilian states of Rio de Janeiro, São Paulo, Paraná and Santa Catarina. The predominantly calcarenite formation with marls dates to the Early Cretaceous period; Early Albian epoch and has a maximum thickness of 2,500 metres (8,200 ft). The formation is the second-most important post-salt reservoir rock of the Santos Basin.

== Etymology ==
The formation is named after the city of Guarujá, São Paulo.

== Description ==
The Guarujá Formation is 832 to 2,500 metres (2,730 to 8,202 ft) thick, and consists of oolitic calcarenites, which laterally grade to greyish ochre and brownish grey calcilutites and grey marls. These facies are interbedded with the alluvial clastics of the Florianópolis Formation. The Guarujá name is restricted to the lowest limestone intercalation, previously named Lower Guarujá by Ojeda and Ahranha in Pereira and Feijó (1994). The microfacies indicate a tidal flat to shallow lagoon and open carbonate platform depositional environment. The age based on planktonic foraminifera and pollen is Early Albian.

=== Petroleum geology ===
The formation is the second-most important post-salt reservoir rock of the Santos Basin, after the Itajaí-Açu Formation.

Field	Year	Operator	Reserves (in place, million barrels)	Reserves (in place, million m^{3})	Notes
Cavalo Marinho	2001	Petrobras	25.04	3.981	
Caravela	1992	Petrobras	48.81	7.760	
Caravela Sul	1991	Petrobras	5	0.79	
Coral	1990	Petrobras	22.57	3.588	
Estrela do Mar	1990	Petrobras	15.16	2.410	
Tubarão	1988	Petrobras	30	4.8	

== See also ==
- Campos Basin
