= Iguape Formation =

Geological formation of the Santos Basin near Brazil

- Stratigraphic range: Paleocene-Pliocene; ~65–2.6 Ma
- Type: Geological formation
- Unit of: Itamambuca Group
- Underlies: Sepetiba Formation
- Overlies: Santos Fm., Itajaí-Açu Fm., Juréia Fm.
- Thickness: up to 2,200 m (7,200 ft)

Lithology
- Primary: Calcarenite
- Other: Shale, marl, siltstone, conglomerate

Location
- Coordinates: 26°6′S 43°43′W
- Region: Santos Basin, South Atlantic
- Country: Brazil

Type section
- Named for: Iguape
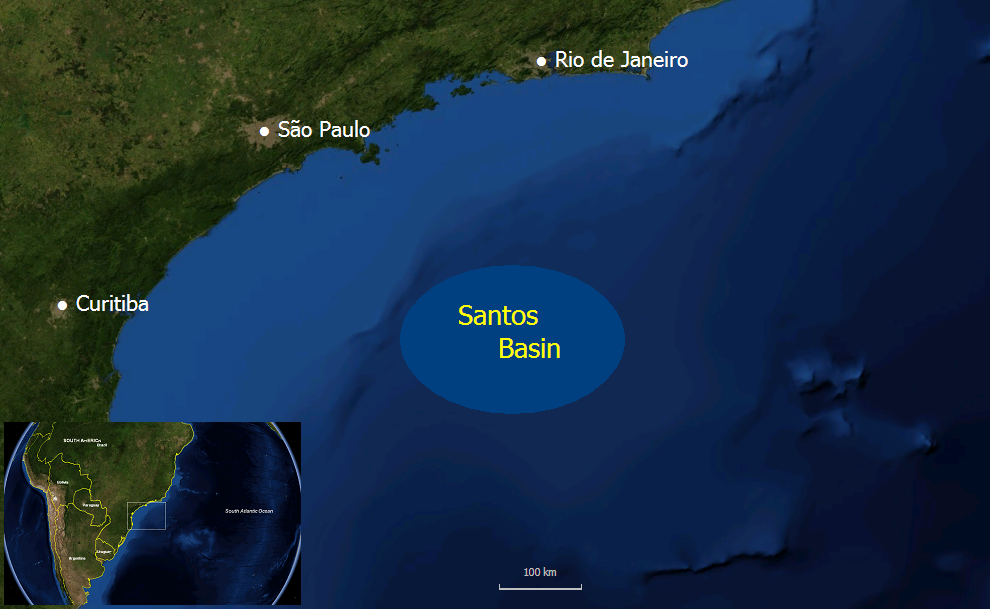
- Location of the Santos Basin

The Iguape Formation (Portuguese: Formacão Iguape) is a geological formation of the Santos Basin offshore of the Brazilian states of Rio de Janeiro, São Paulo, Paraná and Santa Catarina. The calcarenite, shale, siltstone, marl and conglomerate formation dates to the Tertiary period and has a maximum thickness of 2,200 metres (7,200 ft).

== Etymology ==
The formation is named after Iguape, São Paulo.

== Description ==
The Iguape Formation is 1,103 to 2,200 metres (3,619 to 7,218 ft) thick, and consists of bioclastic calcarenites and calcirudites, containing bryozoa, echinoids, corals, foraminifera, fragmented shells, and algae remains. They are interbedded with grey-greenish clays, siltstones, marls and variegated grey fine-to-medium grained conglomerates. These facies are interbedded with and change laterally to the Marambaia Formation. The depositional environment is thought to be a marine carbonate platform, influenced by the arrival of alluvial clastics in the most proximal areas. Biostratigraphic data from planktonic foraminifera, calcareous nannofossils and palynomorphs indicate a Tertiary age. Carbonate production rates of the formation have been estimated at 50 to 55 metres (164 to 180 ft) per million years.

== See also ==
- Campos Basin
