= Santos =

Santos may refer to:

== People ==
- Santos (surname)
- Santos Balmori Picazo (1899–1992), Spanish-Mexican painter
- Santos Benavides (1823–1891), Confederate general in the American Civil War
- Santos Rodriguez (died 1973), American murder victim

== Places ==
- Santos, São Paulo, a municipality in São Paulo, Brazil
  - Port of Santos, container port
  - Santos Basin, offshore sedimentary basin
  - Santos Formation
- Sántos, Somogy county, Hungary
- Santos Peak, Graham Land, Antarctica
- Santos Trail System, a network of mountain bike trails outside Ocala, Florida
- General Santos, a city in the Philippines
- Dr. Santos Avenue, a major thoroughfare in Metro Manila, Philippines
- Strathmore, California, formerly Santos, in Tulare County, California, U.S.

== Football clubs ==
- Santos FC (f. 1912), in Santos, Brazil
- Santos FC (women) (f. 1997), in Santos, Brazil
- Santos Futebol Clube (AP) (f. 1973), in Macapá, Brazil
- Santos Futebol Clube (PB) (f. 1949), in João Pessoa, Brazil
- Santos FC (Burkina Faso) (f. 1977), in Ouagadougou, Burkina Faso
- Santos FC (Guyana), in Georgetown, Guyana
- Santos F.C. (Jamaica)
- Santos F.C. (South Africa) (f. 1982), in Cape Town
- Santos de Guápiles F.C. (f. 1961), in Limón, Costa Rica
- Santos Futebol Clube de Angola (f. 2002), in Viana, Angola
- Santos Laguna or Santos (f. 1983), in Torreón, Mexico
- Santos de Nasca, in Nazca, Peru
- FC Santos Tartu (f. 2006), Estonia
- S.V. Santos, in Nieuw Nickerie, Suriname
- Dagoretti Santos F.C., in Nairobi, Kenya
- Uniao Flamengo Santos F.C., in Gaborone, Botswana

== Other uses ==
- Santos, the plural form of Santo (art)
- Santos Limited, an Australian oil and gas company
- Santos Stadium, now SA Athletics Stadium, Adelaide, South Australia
- Santos TV, a Brazilian TV channel operated by Santos FC
- TV Santos, a private regional TV station in Serbia
- TV Santos, a defunct television station in Santos, São Paulo, Brazil
- Santos, a character in the TV series Ugly Betty
- Bodum Santos, a vacuum coffee maker by Bodum

== See also ==
- Santa (disambiguation)
- Santo (disambiguation)
- Santosh (disambiguation)
- Los Santos (disambiguation)
