= Hiperantha pikachu =

Scientific classification
- Kingdom: Animalia
- Phylum: Arthropoda
- Class: Insecta
- Order: Coleoptera
- Suborder: Polyphaga
- Infraorder: Elateriformia
- Family: Buprestidae
- Genus: Hiperantha
- Species: H. pikachu

Binomial name
- Hiperantha pikachu Pineda & Barros, 2021

Species of beetle

Hiperantha pikachu is a species of jewel beetle found in Brazil.

== Etymology ==
The specific epithet "pikachu" is a reference to the Pokémon character Pikachu, as the beetle's yellow elytra with a black apical band resembles the character's yellow body and black-tipped ears.

== Taxonomy ==
The species was described by Cristian Pineda and Rafael Barros in 2021, based on specimens collected in Prado, Bahia, Brazil.

It is placed in the subgenus Hyperanthoides within the genus Hiperantha. The species is morphologically similar to H. decorata but can be distinguished by its yellow (vs. red) base coloration, the presence of a broad black apical band on the elytra, the smaller transverse spot on the pronotum, and differences in the male genitalia.

== Description ==
Adults are relatively large jewel beetles, with the holotype male measuring 26 mm in total length. The dorsal surface is shiny and appears glabrous but is covered with very short, inconspicuous setae.

- Coloration: Head black. Pronotum and elytra yellow with a black pattern. The pronotum has a large transverse median black spot and a small spot near each posterior angle. The elytra have a distinctive black, W-shaped fascia covering the apical fourth. The ventral side is bluish-black with small yellow spots on the abdominal ventrites.
- Head: Coarsely punctate. Antennae with antennomeres 5–11 expanded apicolaterally.
- Pronotum: 2.1 times as wide as long, broader than the elytra at the base.
- Elytra: 2.3 times as long as wide, finely punctate. The apex is rounded and strongly dentate, with eight teeth on each elytron.
- Male genitalia (aedeagus): Parameres elongated with pointed apices. The median lobe is cuspidate, with an acute apex markedly exceeding the parameres.

Females differ slightly in the shape of the fifth abdominal ventrite.

== Distribution and habitat ==
The species is known only from states of Bahia and Espírito Santo in Brazil.

It is usually found in restinga (type of coastal sandy plain vegetation found in Brazil).
