= Santa (disambiguation) =

Santa usually refers to the character Santa Claus, or Father Christmas.

Santa (feminine form of saint in various languages) may also refer to:

== Arts, entertainment, and media ==
- Santa (1932 film), the first Mexican narrative sound film
- Santa (1943 film), a Mexican film
- Santa (band), a Spanish rock band of the 1980s
- "Santa" (song), by Rvssian, Rauw Alejandro and Ayra Starr
- Santa (TV series), a 1978 Mexican telenovela
- Santa, Hindi title of the 2017 Indian Tamil-language film Sakka Podu Podu Raja

== Places ==
=== Extraterrestrial ===
- 1288 Santa, an asteroid
- (obsolete) Haumea, a dwarf planet given the in-house nickname "Santa"

=== Inhabited places ===
- Santa, Cameroon
- Santa, Ghana
- Santa, Montagnes, Ivory Coast
- Santa, Woroba, Ivory Coast
- Santa Province, Peru
  - Santa District
  - Santa, Peru
- Santa, Ilocos Sur, Philippines
- Santa, now Dumanlı, a district in modern northern Turkey

== People ==
- Alimber Santa (born 2003), Dominican baseball player
- José Santa (born 1970), Colombian football player
- Santa Claus (Alaskan politician), American politician
- Santa (singer), French singer
- Santa (given name), feminine given name

== Other uses ==
- La Santa, a secret criminal society in Italy
- Santa, a stock character in Sardarji jokes
- Santa F1, a grape tomato marketed by Santa Sweets, Inc.
- Santa language, a Mongolic language spoken in northwest China
- Dongxiangs or Santa, an ethnic group in China
- Šanta or Santa, a god worshiped in Bronze Age Anatolia

== See also ==
- Dear Santa (disambiguation)
- My Santa (disambiguation)
- Santa Claus (disambiguation)
- Santa Claus machine, a fictional machine which can be used to convert materials into anything else
- Santa claws (disambiguation)
- Santa's Slay, a 2005 Canadian-American Christmas slasher comedy film that stars professional wrestler Bill Goldberg as Santa Claus
- Santa with Muscles, a 1996 American Christmas comedy film starring Hulk Hogan
- Santalahti, a district in Tampere, Finland
- Santo (disambiguation)
- Santos (disambiguation)
- Secret Santa (disambiguation)
- Los Santos (disambiguation)
- Sant (disambiguation)
- Shantha (disambiguation)
- Satan (disambiguation)
