= Lagosta =

Lagosta may refer to:

- Lagosta, the Italian name for Lastovo, an island in the Adriatic Sea
- Lagosta gas field, Mozambique
- Lagosta oil field, Brazilian off-shore oil and gas field

== See also ==
- Guerra da Lagosta, Portuguese name for the Lobster War
