= Bad Santa (disambiguation) =

Bad Santa is a 2003 Christmas comedy film directed by Terry Zwigoff.

Bad Santa may also refer to:

- Bad Santa 2, a 2016 dark comedy crime film and sequel to Bad Santa
- Bad Santa, the nickname of basketball player Kenny Brunner
- Very Bad Santa, a character in the TV series Happy!

== See also ==
- Santa (disambiguation)
