= Marambaia Formation =

Geological formation of the Santos Basin offshore

- Stratigraphic range: Paleocene-Pliocene; ~65–2.6 Ma
- Type: Geological formation
- Unit of: Itamambuca Group
- Underlies: Sepetiba Formation
- Overlies: Itajaí-Açu Fm., Juréia Fm.
- Thickness: up to 2,700 m (8,900 ft)

Lithology
- Primary: Shale, marl
- Other: Sandstone

Location
- Coordinates: 26°6′S 43°43′W
- Region: Santos Basin, South Atlantic
- Country: Brazil

Type section
- Named for: Restinga da Marambaia
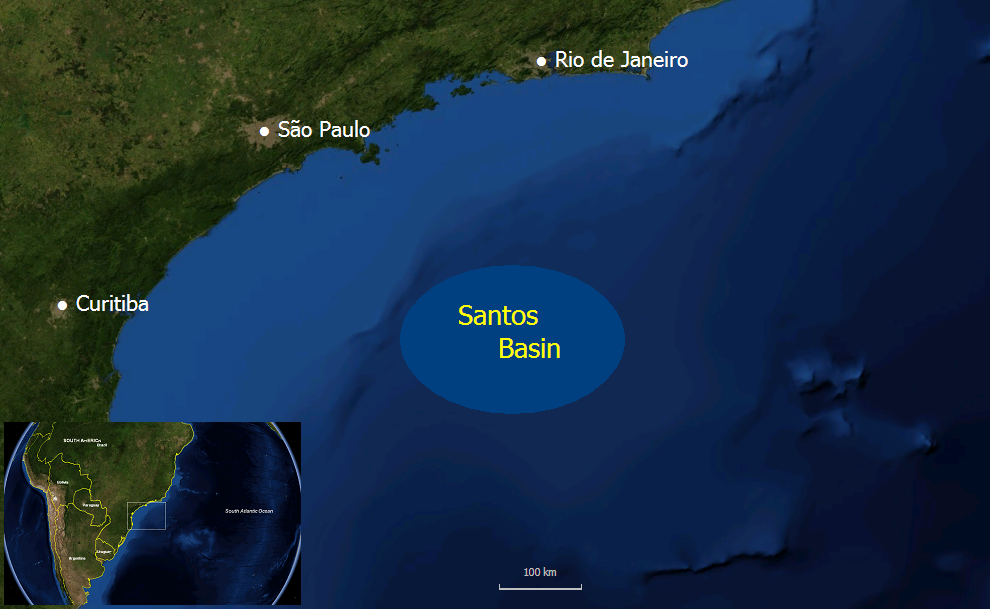
- Location of the Santos Basin

The Marambaia Formation (Portuguese: Formacão Marambaia) is a geological formation of the Santos Basin offshore of the Brazilian states of Rio de Janeiro, São Paulo, Paraná and Santa Catarina. The predominantly shale and marl formation dates to the Tertiary period and has a maximum thickness of 2,700 metres (8,900 ft). The formation is a seal and reservoir rock of the Atlanta and Oliva Fields in the Santos Basin.

== Etymology ==
The formation is named after Restinga da Marambaia, Rio de Janeiro.

== Description ==
The Marambaia Formation is between 261 and 2,000 metres (856 and 6,562 ft) thick, and consists of grey shales and light grey marls interbedded with fine-grained turbiditic sandstones. The Marambaia Formation is the deeper lateral equivalent of the Iguape Formation. This formation in places can be found cropping out at sea bottom. The depositional environment is thought to be talus and open marine basin. Biostratigraphic data indicate a Tertiary age.

The formation is a seal, and reservoir rock in the Atlanta and Oliva Fields of the Santos Basin.

== See also ==
- Campos Basin
