= Santhosh Kumar =

Santhosh Kumar may refer to:

- A. Santhosh Kumar, known professionally as Sandy
- B. Santhosh Kumar, also known as Baiju Santhosh Kumar
- E. Santhosh Kumar
- P. Santhosh Kumar
- V. Santhosh Kumar
- Santhosh Kumar Tamilarasan

== See also ==
- Santosh Kumar (disambiguation)
