= Secret Santa (disambiguation) =

Secret Santa is an anonymous gift-giving tradition among members of a group.

Secret Santa may also refer to:

- Secret Santa (film), also known as Dear Santa
- Secret Santa (single album), by Onewe
- "Secret Santa" (song), by Gwen Stefani
- "Secret Santa" (30 Rock), a television episode
- "Secret Santa" (Castle), a television episode
- "Secret Santa" (The Office), a television episode
- "Secret Santa" (Reno 911!), a television episode
