= Santoshi Maa =

Santoshi Maa may refer to:

- Santoshi Mata, Hindu goddess
- Santoshi Maa (TV series), a 2015 TV series
- Jai Santoshi Maa, 1975 Bollywood film
- Santoshi Maa - Sunayein Vrat Kathayein, a 2019 Indian Hindi language mythological television series

== See also ==
- Santosh (disambiguation)
- Santhoshi, Indian actress
- Rajkumar Santoshi, Bollywood filmmaker
- Santoshi Matsa, Indian weightlifter
