= Santosham =

Santosham or Santhosham (lit. 'happiness' or 'satisfaction' in Sanskrit) may refer to:

- Santosham (1955 film), an Indian Telugu-language film starring N. T. Rama Rao
- Santhosham (1998 film), an Indian Tamil-language film starring Saravanan and Suvalakshmi
- Santosham (2002 film), an Indian Telugu-language film starring Akkineni Nagarjuna and Shriya Saran
- Santhosham (2023 film), an Indian Malayalam-language film starring Amith Chakalakkal and Anu Sithara
- Santosham Film Awards, Indian film awards for Telugu cinema

== See also ==
- Santosh (disambiguation)
