= Dear Santa =

Dear Santa may refer to:

- Dear Santa (1998 film), an American film directed by Fred Olen Ray
- Dear Santa (2005 film), a reality TV special on Fox as part of USPS Operation Santa
- Dear Santa (2011 film), a Canadian romantic drama film directed by Jason Priestley
- Dear Santa (2024 film), an American comedy film directed by Bobby Farrelly
- Dear Santa (EP), a 2015 EP by Girls' Generation-TTS
- "Dear Santa" (song), a 2023 song by OneRepublic
- "Dear Santa", a song from the 1999 album I Wanna Be Santa Claus by Ringo Starr
- "Dear Santa", a song from the 2017 album Tears on the Dancefloor: Crying at the Disco by Steps
- "Dear Santa (Bring Me A Man This Christmas)", a song from the 1983 album Success by The Weather Girls
