= My Santa =

My Santa may refer to:

- Itsudatte My Santa!, a 1998 manga
- My Santa (film), a 2019 Indian Malayalam-language fantasy-comedy thriller

== See also ==
- Santa (disambiguation)
