= Santosh Kumar =

Santosh Kumar may refer to:

- Santosh Kumar (actor) (1925–1982), Pakistani film actor
- Santosh Kumar (politician) (born 1976), Indian politician
- Santosh Kumar (referee) (born 1975), Indian football referee

== See also ==
- Santosh (disambiguation)
- Kumar (disambiguation)
- Santhosh Kumar (disambiguation)
