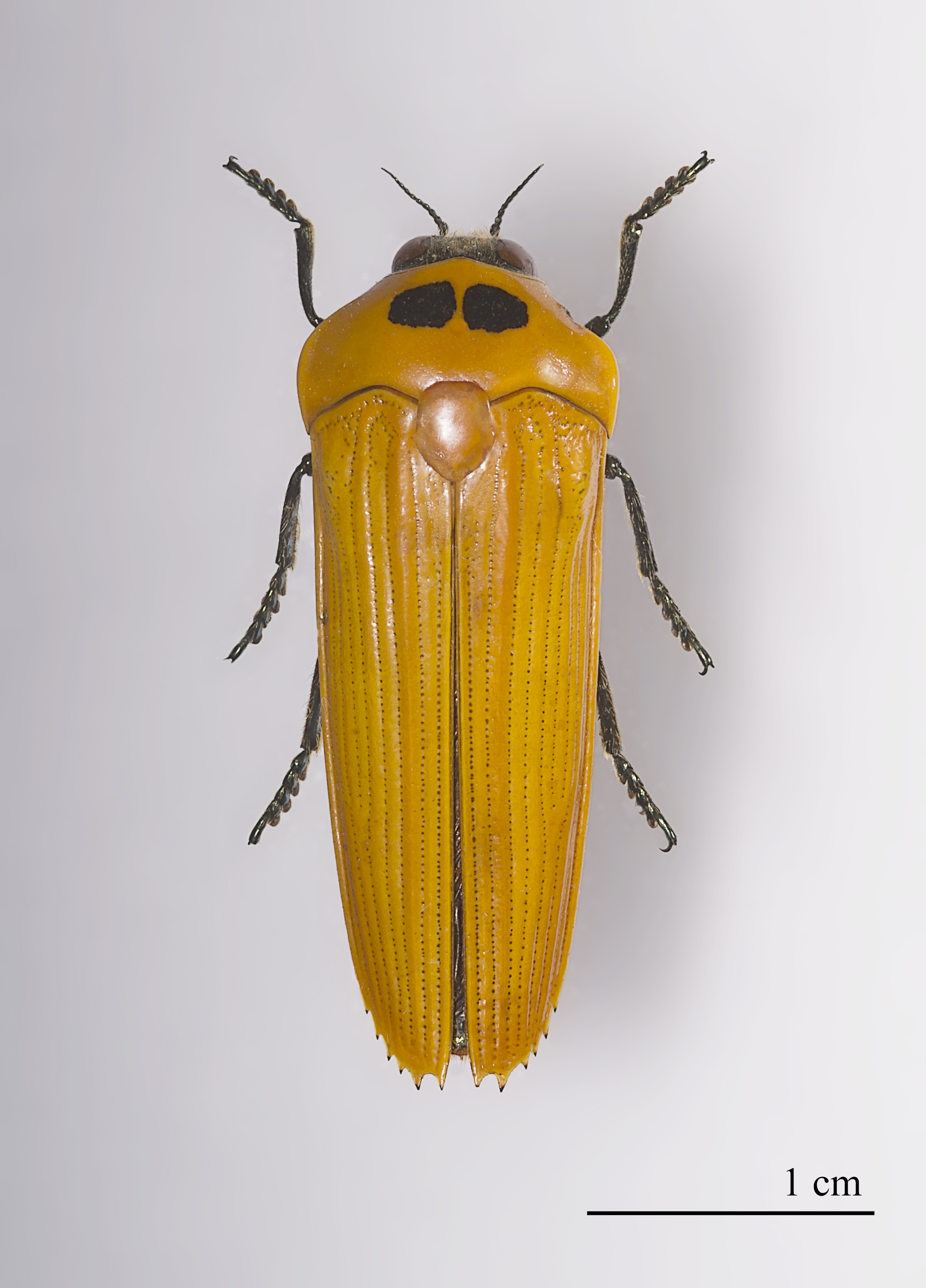
- Hiperantha testacea - MHNT

Scientific classification
- Kingdom: Animalia
- Phylum: Arthropoda
- Class: Insecta
- Order: Coleoptera
- Suborder: Polyphaga
- Infraorder: Elateriformia
- Family: Buprestidae
- Genus: Hiperantha; Gistel, 1834

= Hiperantha =

Genus of beetles

Hiperantha is a genus of jewel beetles found in the Americas.

== Species ==
Genus Hiperantha consists of following 23 species:

- Hiperantha bella Saunders, 1869
- Hiperantha boyi Thery, 1936
- Hiperantha decorata (Gory, 1841)
- Hiperantha fontainieri Thery, 1928
- Hiperantha hoscheki Thery, 1943
- Hiperantha interrogationis (Klug, 1825)
- Hiperantha langsdorffii (Klug, 1825)
- Hiperantha menetriesii Mannerheim, 1837
- Hiperantha pallida Obenberger, 1922
- Hiperantha pikachu Pineda & Barros, 2021
- Hiperantha pilifrons Kerremans, 1903
- Hiperantha quadrisignata Hoscheck, 1928
- Hiperantha sallei Rojas, 1855
- Hiperantha sanguinosa Mannerheim, 1837
- Hiperantha saundersi Thery, 1928
- Hiperantha speculigera (Perty, 1830)
- Hiperantha stempelmanni Berg, 1889
- Hiperantha stigmaticollis Desmarest, 1843
- Hiperantha terminalis (Gory & Laporte, 1839)
- Hiperantha testacea (Fabricius, 1801)
- Hiperantha theryi Hoscheck, 1928
- Hiperantha vittaticollis Desmarest, 1843

== Distribution ==
This genus is found in South and Central America (including Mexico).
