= Itanhaém Formation =

Geological formation of the Santos Basin near Brazil

- Stratigraphic range: Early Albian; ~113–108 Ma
- Type: Geological formation
- Unit of: Camburi Group
- Underlies: Itajaí-Açu Fm., Juréia Fm.
- Overlies: Ariri Formation
- Thickness: up to 1,500 m (4,900 ft)

Lithology
- Primary: Shale, siltstone, marl
- Other: Sandstone

Location
- Coordinates: 26°6′S 43°43′W
- Region: Santos Basin, South Atlantic
- Country: Brazil

Type section
- Named for: Itanhaém
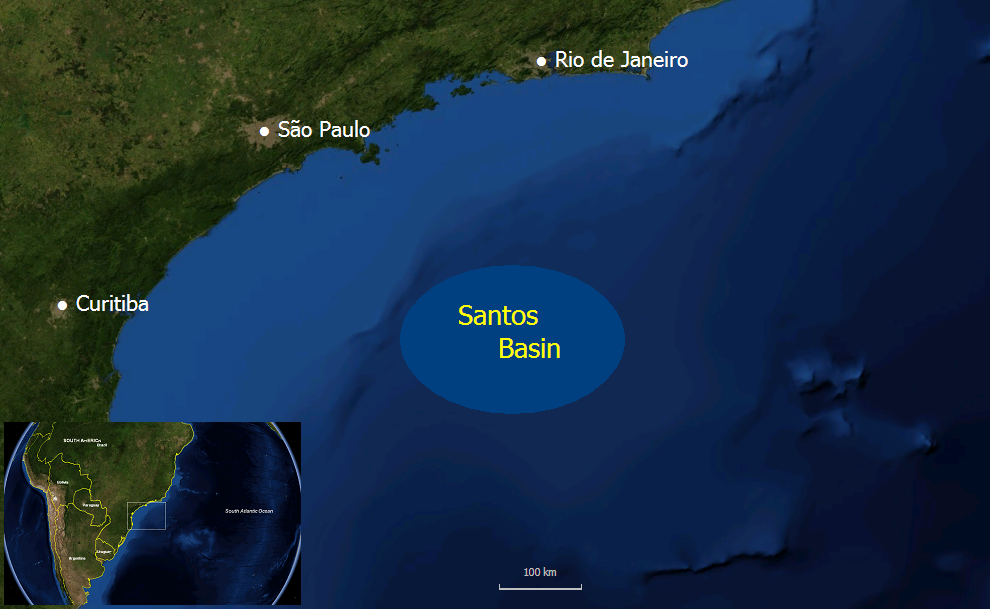
- Location of the Santos Basin

The Itanhaém Formation (Portuguese: Formacão Itanhaém) is a geological formation of the Santos Basin offshore of the Brazilian states of Rio de Janeiro, São Paulo, Paraná and Santa Catarina. The predominantly shale formation with marls, siltstones and sandstones dates to the Early Cretaceous period; Early Albian epoch and has a maximum thickness of 1,500 metres (4,900 ft). The formation is the reservoir rock of the Tambaú Field in the Santos Basin.

== Etymology ==
The formation is named after the town of Itanhaém, São Paulo.

== Description ==
The Itanhaém Formation is 517 to 1,500 metres (1,696 to 4,921 ft) thick, and consists of dark grey shales, siltstones and light grey marls, ochre-brown calcisilts and subordinated sandstones. These facies change laterally into the coarse clastics of the Florianópolis Formation. Facies analysis indicates a marine environment ranging from sub-littoral (inner neritic) and more rarely to pelagic (outer bathyal) conditions. The age based on planktonic foraminifera and pollen is Early Albian.

The formation is the reservoir rock of the Tambaú Field in the Santos Basin.

== See also ==
- Campos Basin
