= Sepetiba Formation =

Geological formation of the Santos Basin near Brazil

- Stratigraphic range: Pleistocene-Holocene; ~2.6–0 Ma
- Type: Geological formation
- Unit of: Itamambuca Group
- Overlies: Iguape Fm., Marambaia Fm.
- Thickness: up to 570 m (1,870 ft)

Lithology
- Primary: Coquina

Location
- Coordinates: 26°6′S 43°43′W
- Region: Santos Basin, South Atlantic
- Country: Brazil

Type section
- Named for: Sepetiba
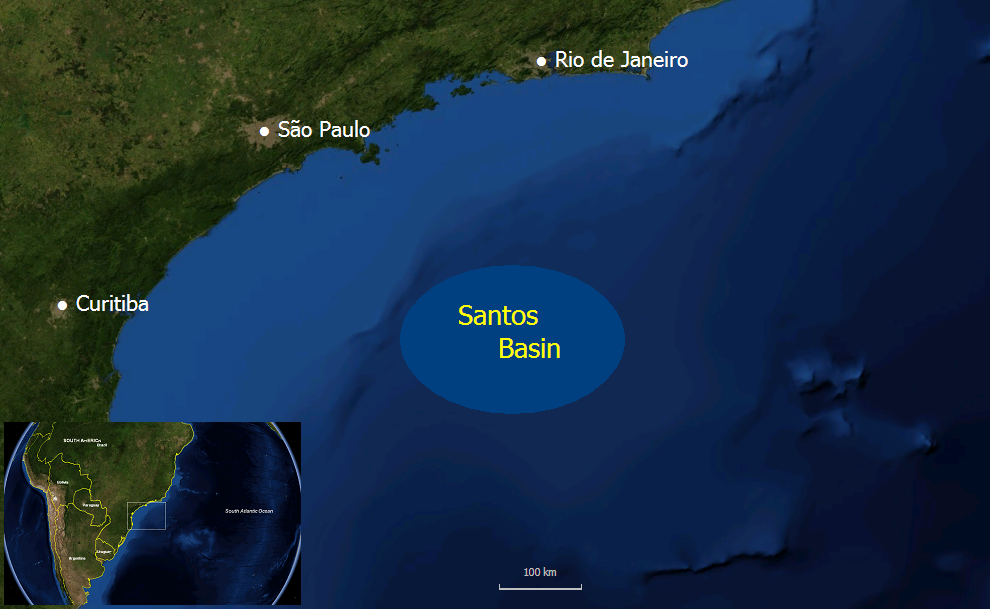
- Location of the Santos Basin

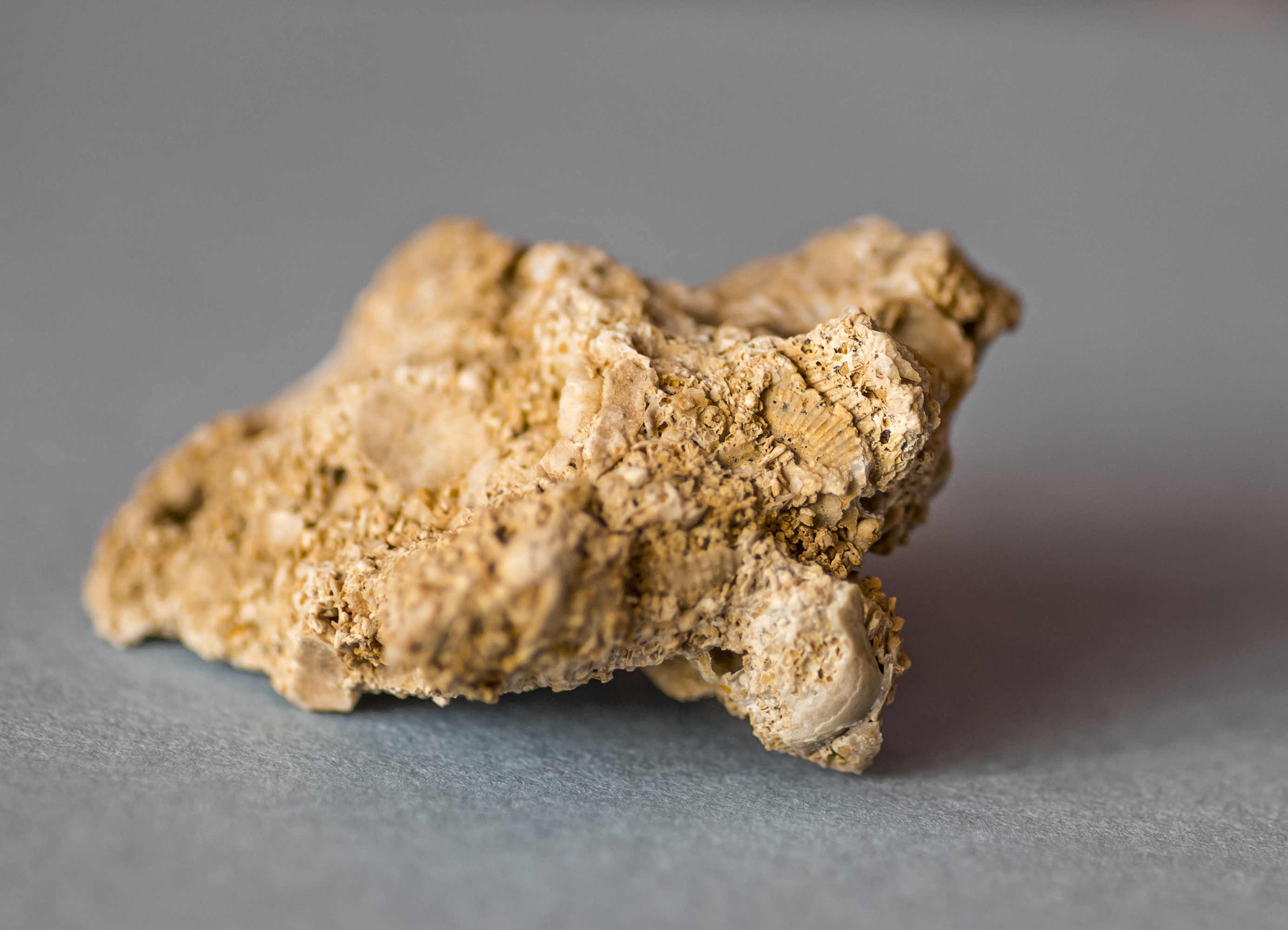
Close-up of a coquina; carbonitic sandstones composed of broken shells

The Sepetiba Formation (Portuguese: Formação Sepetiba) is a geological formation of the Santos Basin offshore of the Brazilian states of Rio de Janeiro, São Paulo, Paraná and Santa Catarina. The predominantly coquina formation dates to the Pleistocene period to recent and has a variable but maximum thickness of 570 metres (1,870 ft). The formation is the uppermost unit of the Santos Basin.

== Etymology ==
The formation is named after Sepetiba, a neighbourhood of Rio de Janeiro.

== Description ==
The Sepetiba Formation is the uppermost formation of the Santos Basin stratigraphy. It has a variable thickness, with a maximum of 570 metres (1,870 ft), due to the proximal erosion of the uppermost part. The formation consists of whitish grey fine to coarse grained carbonitic sands. They are feldspar-rich, glauconitic coquinas consisting of bivalve fragments and foraminifera. The depositional environment is thought to be coastal.

== See also ==
- Campos Basin
