= Santo =

Santo ('saint' in various languages) may refer to:

== People ==
- Santo (given name)
- Santo (surname)
- El Santo, Rodolfo Guzmán Huerta (1917–1984), Mexican wrestler and actor
- Bob Santo or Santo, stage name of Ghanaian comedian John Evans Kwadwo Bosompem (1940–2002)
- Ferdinand III of Castile (1200–1252) called "el Santo" ("the Saint")

== Places ==
- Santo, Ouest, a village in Haiti
- Santō, Hyōgo, a former town in Japan
- Santō, Shiga, a town in Japan
- Santo, Texas, an unincorporated community in the United States
- Basilica of Saint Anthony of Padua, Italy, known locally as il Santo
- Espiritu Santo, the largest island of Vanuatu, nicknamed Santo
  - Luganville, known locally as Santo

== Arts and entertainment ==
- Santo (art), a wooden or ivory statue depicting a holy figure
- Santo (EP), by Alonso Brito, 2008
- "Santo" (song), by Christina Aguilera, 2022
- "Santo", a song by Ely Buendia
- Il Santo (novel), Antonio Fogazzaro, 1905

== See also ==
- Los Santos (disambiguation)
- Santos (disambiguation)
- Santa (disambiguation)
- Sao (disambiguation)
- Espírito Santo (disambiguation)
- Espiritu Santo (disambiguation)
