= Santoshpur =

Santoshpur may refer to:

- Santoshpur, Kolkata, a neighbourhood of Kolkata, West Bengal, India
- Santoshpur, Garden Reach, South 24 Parganas district, West Bengal
  - Santoshpur railway station
- Santoshpur, Purba Bardhaman, a village in West Bengal, India
- Santoshpur, Uluberia, a census town in West Bengal, India

== See also ==
- Santosh (disambiguation)
