= Los Santos =

Los Santos may refer to:

== Places ==
- Los Santos, Santander, Colombia
- Los Santos Zone, San José Province, Costa Rica
- Los Santos Province, Panama
  - Los Santos District
  - La Villa de los Santos
- Los Santos, Castile and León, Spain
  - Los Santos mine
- Los Santos de la Humosa, Spain
- Los Santos de Maimona, Spain

== Other uses ==
- Los Santos (Grand Theft Auto), a fictional setting based off Los Angeles in the video game series Grand Theft Auto

== See also ==
- Santos (disambiguation)
- Santa (disambiguation)
- Santo (disambiguation)
