= Florianópolis Formation =

Geological formation of the Santos Basin near Brazil

- Stratigraphic range: Albian; ~113–100 Ma
- Type: Geological formation
- Unit of: Camburi Group
- Underlies: Santos Formation
- Overlies: Ariri Formation
- Thickness: 343 m (1,125 ft) (type well)

Lithology
- Primary: Sandstone
- Other: Siltstone, shale

Location
- Coordinates: 26°6′S 43°43′W
- Region: Santos Basin, South Atlantic
- Country: Brazil

Type section
- Named for: Florianópolis
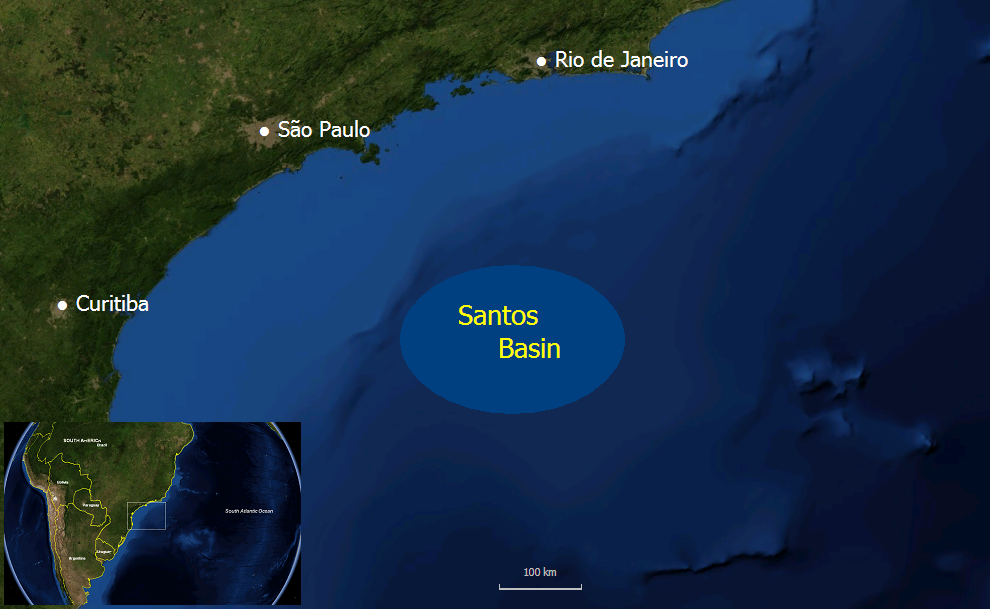
- Location of the Santos Basin

The Florianópolis Formation (Portuguese: Formacão Florianópolis) is a geological formation of the Santos Basin offshore of the Brazilian states of Rio de Janeiro, São Paulo, Paraná and Santa Catarina. The predominantly sandstone formation with interbedded shales and siltstones dates to the Early Cretaceous period; Albian epoch and has a thickness in the type oil well of 343 metres (1,125 ft).

== Etymology ==
The formation is named after the city of Florianópolis, Santa Catarina.

== Description ==
The Florianópolis Formation is 343 metres (1,125 ft) thick in the type oil well, and consists of reddish, fine to coarse-grained sandstones with a clay matrix, reddish micaceous shales and siltstones. These clastic units are thought to represent alluvial environments distributed along the western Brazilian basin margin, along the Santos Hinge Line. These alluvial environments were gradational towards the east, with the shallow marine carbonates of the Guarujá Formation, and further to the open basin with the siltstones of the Itanhaém Formation. Biostratigraphical data and its relations with the Guarujá Formation point towards an Albian age. The formation is laterally equivalent to the Goitacás Formation of the Campos Basin to the north.

The formation is the reservoir rock of the Pirapitanga Field in the Santos Basin.

== See also ==
- Campos Basin
