= Lagosta Field =

Oil and gas field in Brazil

- Location of the field in the Santos Basin
- Country: Brazil
- Region: Santos Basin
- Block: BS-1
- Offshore/onshore: Offshore
- Coordinates: 25°11′S 45°00′W
- Operator: Petrobras, formerly El Paso Corp.

Field history
- Discovery: July 2003
- Start of development: 2009

Production
- Estimated oil in place: 35.16 million barrels (~4.797×10^{6} t)
- Estimated gas in place: 173×10^{9} cu ft (4.9×10^{9} m^{3})
- Producing formations: Itajaí-Açu Formation

Lagosta Field is an oil and gas field located in the Santos Basin of southeastern Brazil. The field was discovered in July 2003 and was operated by El Paso Corp. oil company, holding a 60% stake with Petrobras owning the other 40%. Later, the field passed to Petrobras as operator. The field is estimated to contain 0.173 trillion cubic feet (4.9×10^{9} m^{3}) of gas, and 35.16 million barrels (5.590×10^{6} m^{3}) of oil in the Itajaí-Açu Formation. The field, located next to the Merluza Field, the first discovery in the Santos Basin in 1979, started development in 2009.

== See also ==
- Campos Basin
- Tupi oil field
