= Restinga =

Type of forest in eastern Brazil

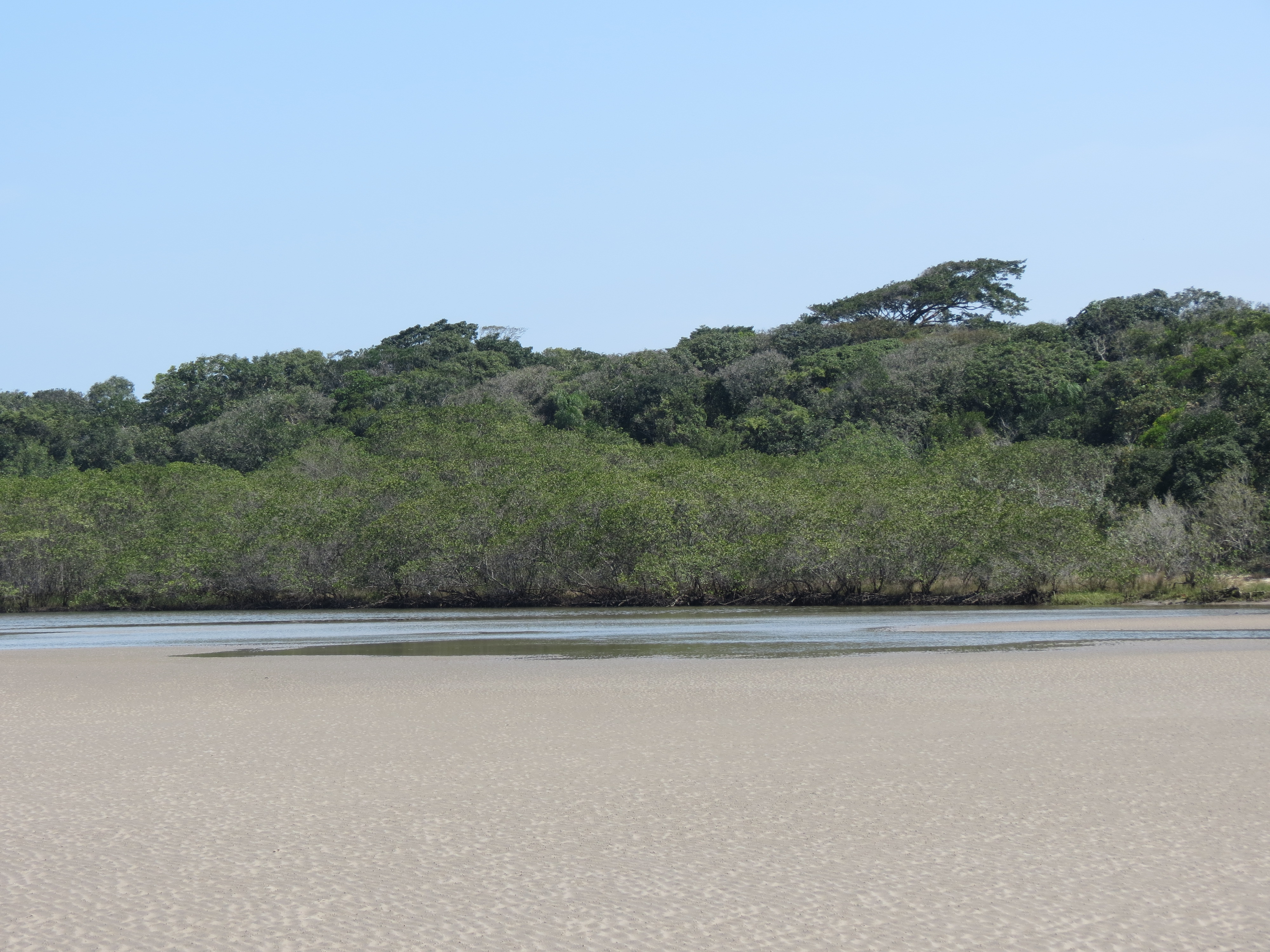
Restinga habitat, São Paulo state

Restingas (Portuguese pronunciation: [ʁesˈtʃĩɡɐ]) are a distinct type of coastal tropical and subtropical moist broadleaf forest in eastern Brazil. They form on sandy, acidic, and nutrient-poor soils, and are characterized by medium-sized trees and shrubs adapted to the drier and nutrient-poor conditions. One of the most notable restingas is the Restinga da Marambaia (in Rio de Janeiro), which is owned and kept by the Brazilian Army.

== Ecoregions ==
The World Wildlife Fund distinguishes two Restinga ecoregions.

- Atlantic Coast restingas — found in several enclaves along Brazil's east coast from Rio Grande do Norte state in northeastern Brazil to Rio Grande do Sul state in southern Brazil, covering an area of 7,900 square kilometers (3,100 sq mi) that extends from the tropics to the subtropics. Its flora and fauna shares affinities with the humid Atlantic forest of eastern Brazil.
- Northeastern Brazil restingas — found along the northern coast of Brazil, in Maranhão, Piauí, and Ceará states. Its flora and fauna are distinct from that of the Atlantic Coast restingas, with greater affinities to the moist forests of the Amazon biome.

== See also ==
- List of plants of Atlantic Forest vegetation of Brazil
- Ecoregions of the Atlantic Forest biome
