= Santos Basin =

Sedimentary basin in the south Atlantic Ocean

- Bacia de Santos
- Location within Brazil

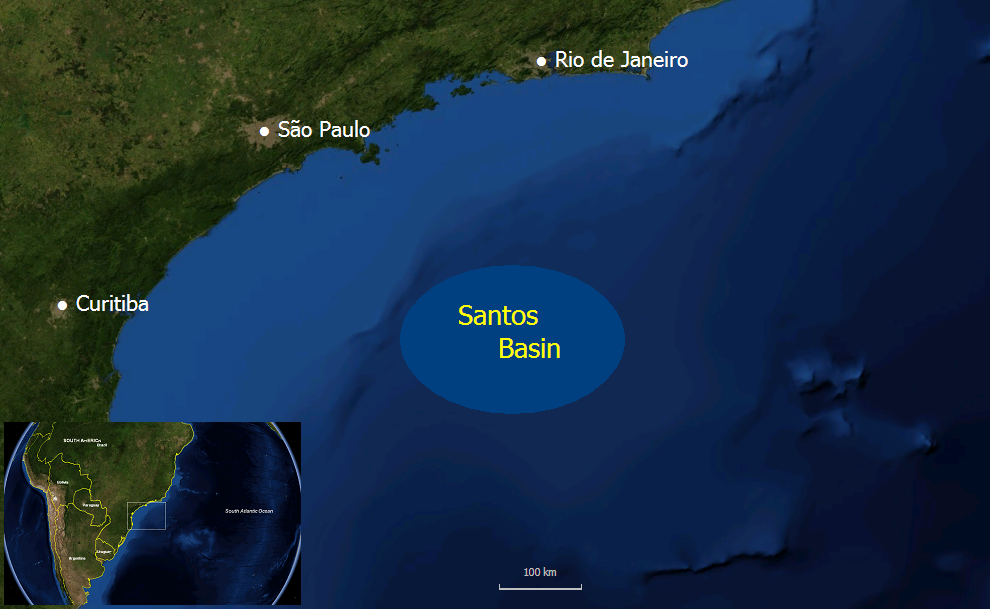
- Location of the basin offshore Brazil
- Coordinates: 26°6′22″S 43°43′45″W
- Etymology: Santos
- Location: South America
- Region: Southeast, South
- Country: Brazil
- States: Rio de Janeiro, São Paulo, Paraná, Santa Catarina
- Cities: Cabo Frio, Rio de Janeiro, Guarujá, Santos, Itajaí, Balneário Camboriú, Florianópolis

Characteristics
- On/Offshore: Both, mostly offshore
- Boundaries: Cabo Frio, Florianópolis Highs, Serra do Mar
- Part of: Brazilian Atlantic margin basins
- Area: ~352,000 km^{2} (136,000 sq mi)

Hydrology
- Sea: South Atlantic Ocean
- River: Ribeira de Iguape

Geology
- Basin type: Passive margin on rift basin
- Plate: South American
- Orogeny: Break-up of Gondwana
- Age: Barremian-recent
- Stratigraphy: Stratigraphy
- Fields: Tupi, Libra, Júpiter, others

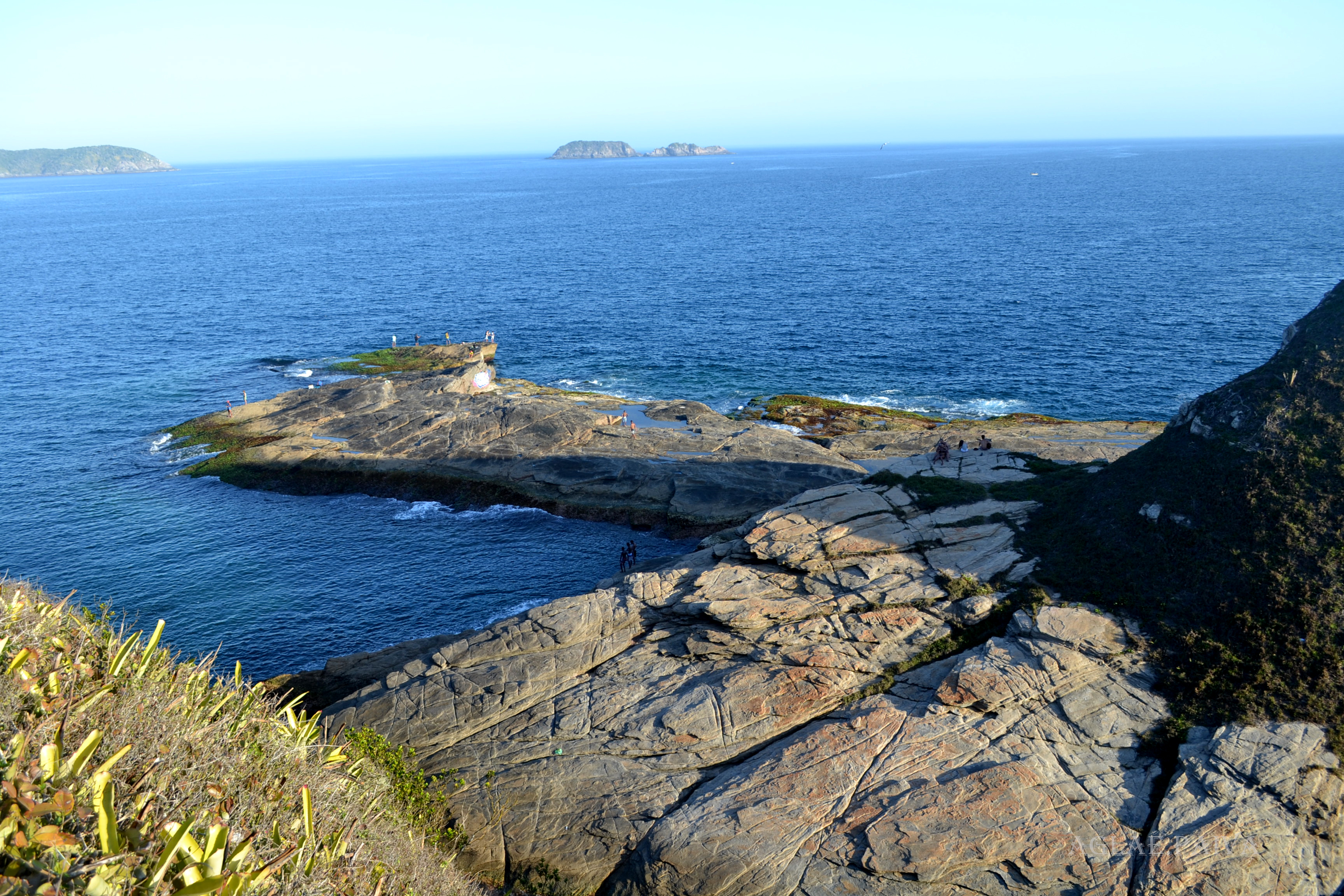
The northern edge of the basin is formed by the Cabo Frio High, extending southeastward from Cabo Frio at the coast.

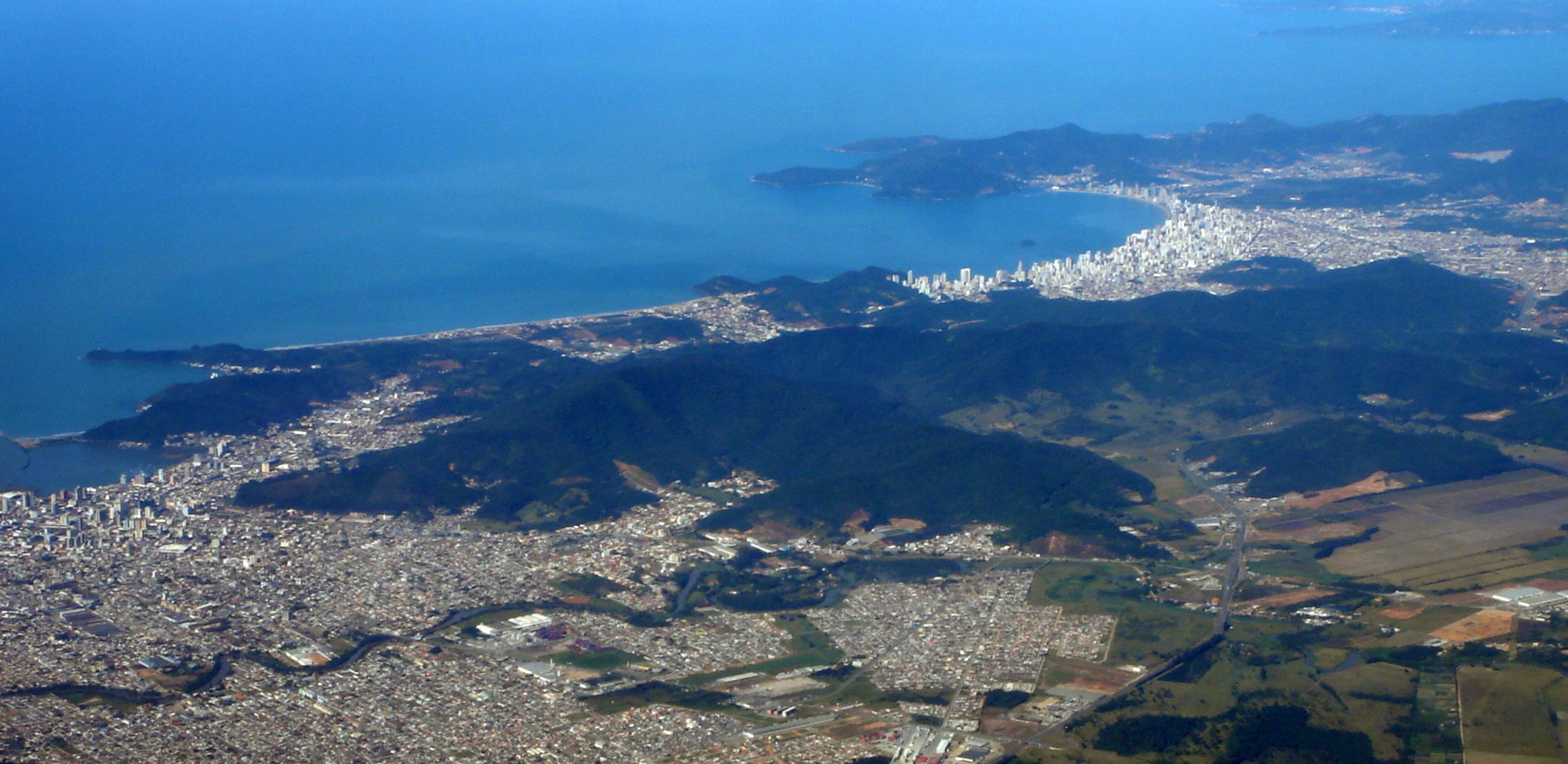
Itajaí (left) and Balneario Camboriú (right) at the southern edge of onshore Santos Basin

The Santos Basin (Portuguese: Bacia de Santos) is an approximately 352,000 square kilometres (136,000 sq mi) large mostly offshore sedimentary basin. It is located in the south Atlantic Ocean, some 300 kilometres (190 mi) southeast of Santos, Brazil. The basin is one of the Brazilian basins to have resulted from the break-up of Gondwana since the Early Cretaceous, where a sequence of rift basins formed on both sides of the South Atlantic; the Pelotas, Santos, Campos and Espírito Santo Basins in Brazil, and the Namibia, Kwanza and Congo Basins in southwestern Africa.

Santos Basin is separated from the Campos Basin to the north by the Cabo Frio High and the Pelotas Basin in the south by the Florianópolis High and the northwestern boundary onshore is formed by the Serra Do Mar coastal range. The basin is known for its thick layers of salt that have formed structures in the subsurface due to halokinesis. The basin started forming in the Early Cretaceous on top of the Congo Craton as a rift basin. The rift stage of the basin evolution combined with the arid Aptian climate of the southern latitudes resulted in the deposition of evaporites in the Late Aptian, approximately 112 million years ago. The phase of rifting was followed by a thermal sag phase and drift stage in the widening of the South Atlantic Ocean. This process led to the deposition of a more than 20 kilometres (66,000 ft) thick succession of clastic and carbonate sediments.

One of the largest Brazilian sedimentary basins, it is the site of several recently (2007 and later) discovered giant oil and gas fields, including the first large pre-salt discovery Tupi (8 billion barrels), Júpiter (1.6 billion barrels and 17 tcf of gas), and Libra, with an estimated 8 to 12 billion barrels of recoverable oil. Main source rocks are the lacustrine shales and carbonates of the pre-salt Guaratiba Group and the marine shales of the post-salt Itajaí-Açu Formation. Reservoir rocks are formed by the pre-salt Guaratiba sandstones, limestones and microbialites, the Albian limestones of the Guarujá Formation and the Late Cretaceous to Paleogene turbiditic sandstones of the Itanhaém, Juréia, Itajaí-Açu, Florianópolis and Marambaia Formations. The mobile salt of the Ariri Formation forms regional seals, as well as the shales of the post-salt sedimentary infill. In 2014, the total production of only the sub-salt reservoirs accumulated to more than 250 thousand barrels per day (40×10^{3} m^{3}/d). In 2017, the Santos Basin accounted for 35% of Brazil's oil, with the northern neighbour Campos Basin at 55%.

== Etymology ==
The Santos Basin is named after the coastal city of Santos in the state of São Paulo.

== Description ==
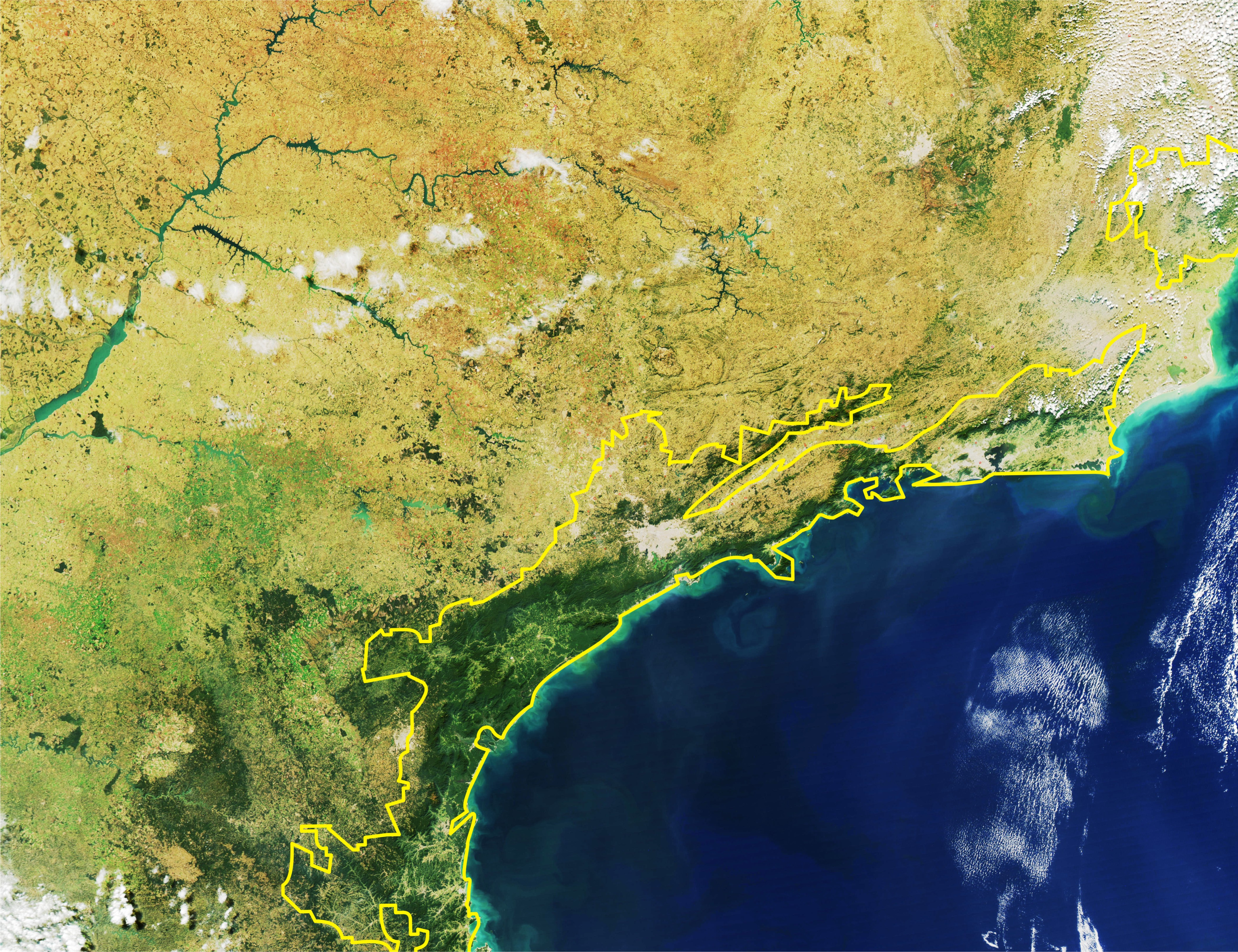
Outline of the Serra do Mar coastal forest ecoregion, bordering the Santos Basin

The Santos Basin is a mostly offshore sedimentary basin across the Tropic of Capricorn, bordering from north to south the Brazilian states of Rio de Janeiro, Sáo Paulo, Paraná and Santa Catarina. The basin covers an area of approximately 352,000 square kilometres (136,000 sq mi), and is bounded in the north by the Cabo Frio High, separating the basin from the Campos Basin and the Florianópolis High and Fracture Zone, separating the Santos Basin from the Pelotas Basin.

Along the Brazilian coast, the basin is bounded by the Serra do Mar and stretches from Cabo Frio in the northeast to Florianópolis in the southwest. The city of Rio de Janeiro is located at the coastal edge of the Santos Basin in the northern portion, Santos, Guarujá and the islands of Ilhabela in the central area and Itajaí and Balneário Camboriú in the south of the basin. Within the basin, several highs are located. The Outer High, in the distal part of the Santos Basin, is the most prominent and extensive intra-basinal high with an approximate area of 12,000 square kilometres (4,600 sq mi). The Outer High is likely a segmented series of rift fault-block shoulders which were uplifted and eroded during the Late Barremian.

The climate of the onshore stretch of the basin ranges from tropical savanna climate (Aw), tropical monsoon climate (Am) and tropical rainforest climate (Af) to a humid subtropical climate (Cfa). The onshore portion of the Santos Basin is in the Serra do Mar coastal forests ecoregion of the Atlantic Forest biome. On the islands of the Superagüi National Park in the Santos Basin, the endemic critically endangered Superagüi lion tamarin (Leontopithecus caissara) has its restricted habitat.

=== Tectonic history ===
The break-up of Pangaea characterised the start of formation of the Santos Basin in the South Atlantic, forming at the same time the Kwanza Basin in Africa.

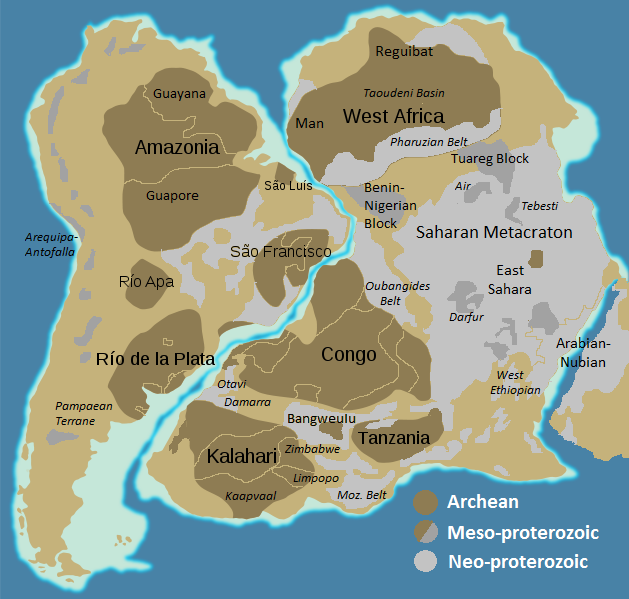
The Santos Basin formed with the rifting of Brazil and Africa splitting the Congo Craton from the Araçuaí Belt, shown as a thin brown strip.

Schematic diagram of the formation of a passive margin on a rift basin

The South Atlantic margin developed on Archean stable cratons consisting of hard and resistant rocks and partly on the Neoproterozoic mobile belts composed of less resistant metamorphic rocks. The Precambrian basement of the Santos Basin is exposed as the Araçuaí Belt along the Brazilian coast, most notably in the inselbergs of Rio de Janeiro, of which Sugarloaf Mountain is the most iconic. The ancient rocks consist of a Neoproterozoic to Cambrian high-grade metamorphic core of granites and gneisses, formed during the collision of Gondwana in the Pan-African-Brasiliano orogeny. Basalts similar to the Paraná and Etendeka traps, exposed to the west in the Paraná Basin, have been found underlying the Santos Basin. The Tristan da Cunha hotspot, known as the Tristan hotspot, is considered the driver behind the formation of these flood basalts.

During the Early Cretaceous, the former continent Gondwana, as southern part of Pangea, starting to break-up, resulting in a sequence of rift basins bordering the present-day South Atlantic. The Pelotas-Namibia spreading commenced in the Hauterivian, around 133 million years ago and reached the Santos Basin to the north in the Barremian. Seafloor spreading continued northwards to the Campos Basin in the Early Albian, at approximately 112 Ma.

Five tectonic stages have been identified in the Brazilian basins:

1. Pre-rift stage – Jurassic to Valanginian
2. Syn-rift stage – Hauterivian to Late Barremian
3. Sag stage – Late Barremian to Late Aptian
4. Post-rift stage – Early to Middle Albian
5. Drift stage – Late Albian to Holocene

The sag phase in the Santos Basin was characterised by thermal subsidence and generated restricted depocentres with relatively uniform water depths, ranging from 600 to 950 metres (1,970 to 3,120 ft). The Late Aptian climate was arid with high evaporation rates which triggered hypersaline conditions in these marginal sag basins. This resulted in the accumulation of thick layers of evaporites along the Brazilian and southwestern African continental margins, a process continuing towards the north later in the Cretaceous. The deposition of the lowermost 600 metres (2,000 ft) of salt in the Aptian would have taken approximately 20,000 to 30,000 years. With the continental break-up of the Santos and Campos Basins from the opposite Namibia and Kwanza Basins, oceanic circulation returned during the post-rift stage. The drift phase since the Late Cretaceous produced a thick sequence of clastic and carbonate deposits. Differential thermal regimes and sediment loading of these units produced halokinesis; salt movement in the subsurface. The resulting salt diapirs, listric and thrust faults and various salt-related structures produced several stratigraphic and combined stratigraphic-structural traps for hydrocarbon accumulation in the Brazilian and southwest African offshore.

During the phases of halokinesis, dated to the Albian to Paleocene, several areas of the now deep water distal part of the Santos Basin were exposed to subaerial conditions and suffered erosion. The distal parts of the basin were affected by E-W to NW-SE oriented shortening, sub-perpendicular to the Brazilian margin.

=== Stratigraphy ===
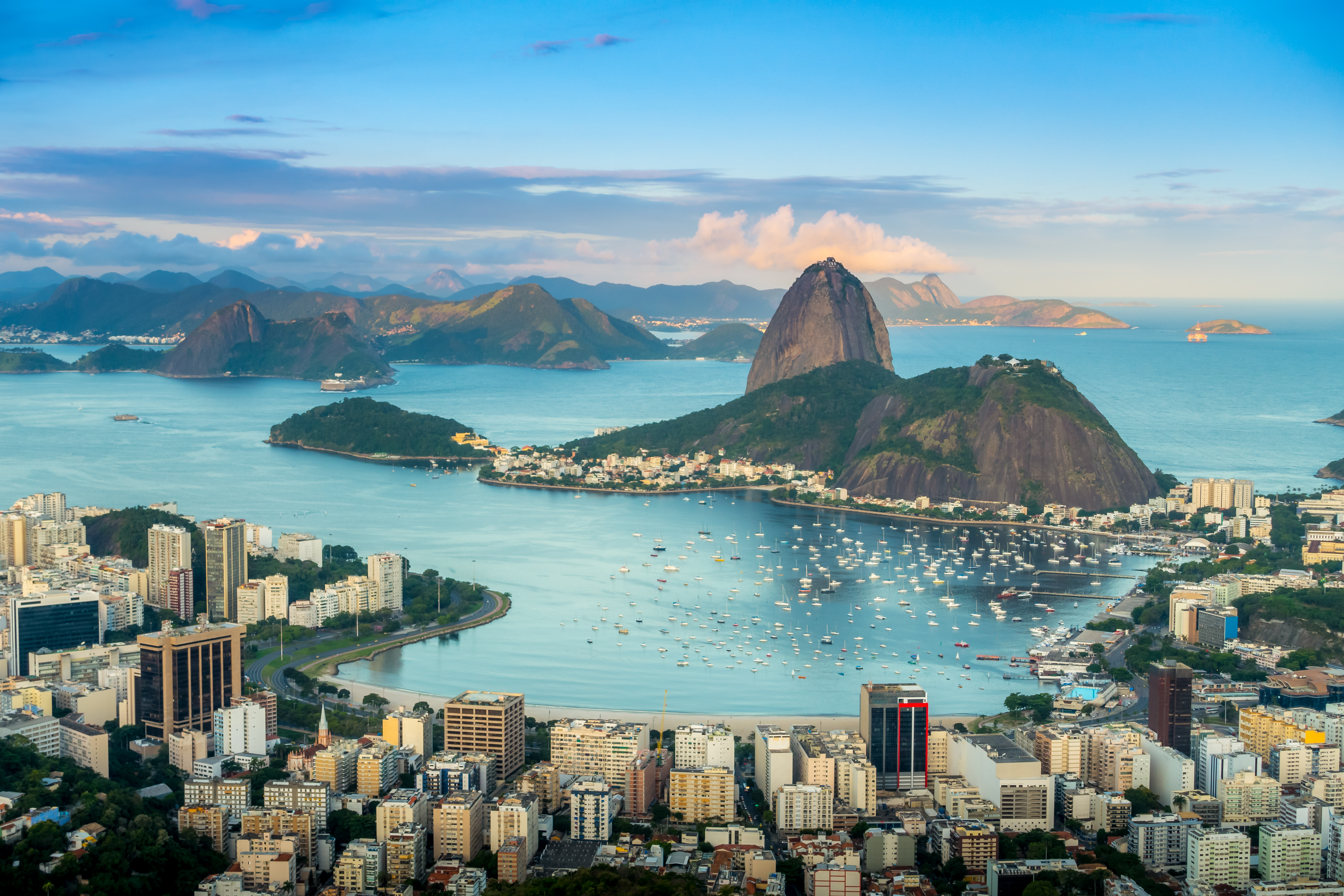
Sugarloaf Mountain and the other inselbergs of Rio de Janeiro are the onshore representatives of the basement of the Santos Basin.

The basement of the Santos Basin is composed of granites and gneisses of the Araçuarí Belt that formed at the western boundary of the Congo Craton. The erosion resistant metamorphic and magmatic rocks are exposed in the Serra do Mar, forming the edge of the Santos Basin along the Brazilian coast.

The total stratigraphic thickness of the sediments in the Santos Basin has been estimated at 23,170 metres (76,020 ft) and has been described in detail by Clemente in 2013.

==== I – Guaratiba Group (Hauterivian-Aptian, pre-salt sequence) ====
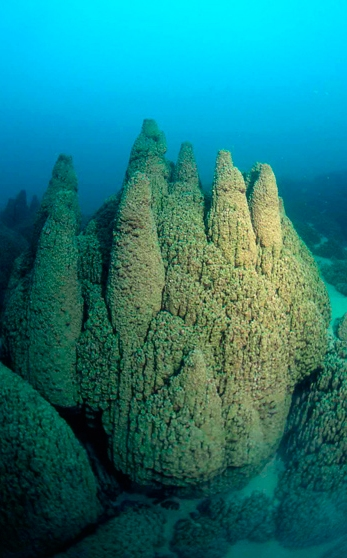
The Guaratiba Group is characterised by the presence of microbialites, like this present-day example in Pavilion Lake, Canada. These organic build-up structures are the reservoir of the giant pre-salt Tupi field, holding 8000 million barrels of oil.

The Guaratiba Group is 4,200 metres (13,800 ft) thick and includes four formations, from old to young the Camboriú, Piçarras, Itapema and Barra Velha Formations. The group is equivalent to the Lagoa Feia Group of the Campos Basin.

Camboriú Formation

The Camboriú Formation is 40 metres (130 ft) thick and includes the basaltic rocks with a basin–wide distribution. The basalts are dark green to dark grey, holocrystalline, medium grained, with an ophiolitic texture. The main components are plagioclase and augite, usually fresh, non-altered.

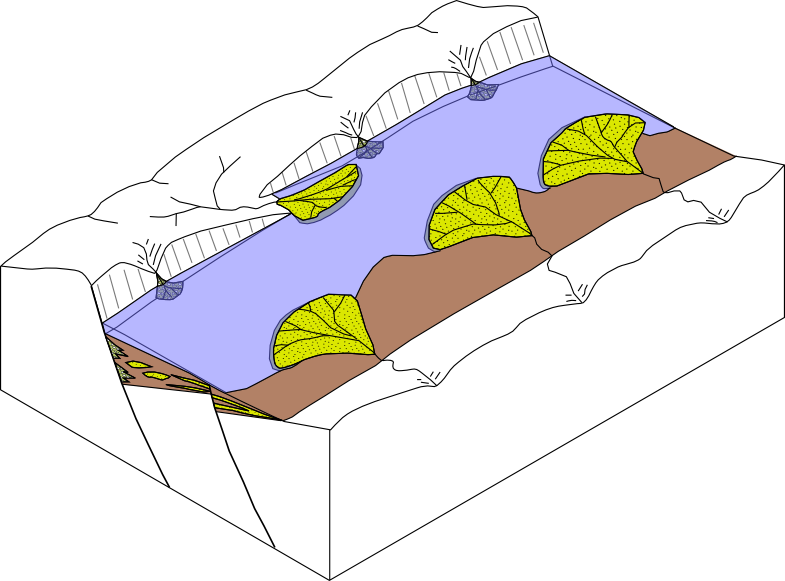
The syn-rift stage of the Santos Basin was characterised by the formation of half-grabens where rift shoulders were exposed and eroded, providing various sediment sources for the deposition in the lacustrine to shallow marine parts.

Piçarras Formation

The Piçarras Formation is 990 metres (3,250 ft) thick and consists of clastic and carbonate rocks. The formation includes reddish polymictic conglomerates, with clasts of basalt and quartz in a clay-sandy matrix. It also includes white, reddish lacustrine coquinas (shelly limestones) and sandstones, siltstones and shales of stevensite composition. Its age, based on the ostracod assemblages, is Hauterivian to Aptian.

The conglomerates and sandstones of the formation are representative of an alluvial environment. The coquinas represent a shallow lacustrine environment. Similar to the Atafona Formation of the Campos Basin, the sandstones, stevensite-bearing siltstones and shales represent an alkaline lacustrine environment affected by volcanic activity. The shales represent deeper lacustrine waters in more distal areas. The alternation of the two facies implies a series of alluvial progradation-retractions into the Cretaceous carbonate lakes. The low textural and compositional maturity of conglomerates and sandstones implies the basin was supplied from areas close to the basin margins.

Itapema Formation

The Itapema Formation is several hundreds of metres thick and consists of calcirudites (limestones) and dark shales. The calcirudite limestones consist of fragmented bivalve shells, frequently dolomitized and silicified. In more distal sections, the formation consists of dark organic matter rich shales. In the well 1-RSJ-625, the formation includes 110 metres (360 ft) of radioactive shales interbedded with carbonates. These facies are thought to represent a lacustrine environment. The organic matter-rich shales are one of the main source rocks of the Santos Basin. This formation is correlative with the Coqueiros Formation in the Campos Basin. The age of the Itapema Formation is Barremian to Aptian.

Barra Velha Formation

The Barra Velha Formation is approximately 300 to 350 metres (980 to 1,150 ft) thick. In the proximal sections, the formation comprises limestones of stromatolites and laminated microbialites. In the distal sections, it is composed of shales. Interbedded with the laminated microbialites there are limestones with packstone and grainstone textures made up of algal clasts and bioclasts (fragmented ostracods). The carbonates frequently are partly or completely dolomitized. These facies represent a transitional continental and shallow marine environment. The age of this formation has been estimated to be Late Barremian to Aptian. It is correlative with the Macabu Formation in the Campos Basin, as both are typified by laminated microbialites and stromatolites. These limestones are one of the sub-salt reservoirs in the Santos Basin.

==== II – Ariri Formation (Late Aptian, salt sequence) ====
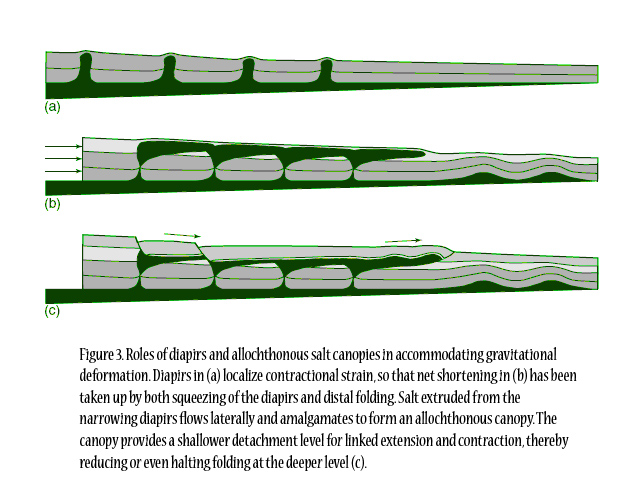
The Ariri Formation, originally deposited as flat evaporite layers, has undergone extensive diapirism and canpoy formation during the Albian to Paleocene.

The Ariri Formation is in the type oil well 581 metres (1,906 ft) thick and may be up to 4,000 metres (13,000 ft) thick in other areas of the basin. It is predominantly composed of evaporites. The formation is characterized by thick intervals of white halite, associated with white anhydrite, ochre greyish calcilutites, shales and marls. The sedimentary environment probably was restricted marine including mudflat sabkhas, evolving under an arid climate. The ostracod assemblages of this formation indicate a neo-Algoas age (local time scale).

==== III – Camburi Group (Albian-Cenomanian, lower post-salt sequence) ====
The Camburi Group is up to 6,100 metres (20,000 ft) thick and includes three formations, Florianópolis, Guarujá and Itanhaém.

Florianópolis Formation

The Florianópolis Formation is 343 metres (1,125 ft) thick in the type oil well, and consists of reddish, fine to coarse-grained sandstones with a clay matrix, reddish micaceous shales and siltstones. These clastic units are thought to represent alluvial environments distributed along the western Brazilian basin margin, along the Santos Hinge Line. These alluvial environments were gradational towards the east, with the shallow marine carbonates of the Guarujá Formation, and further to the open basin with the siltstones of the Itanhaém Formation. Biostratigraphical data and its relations with the Guarujá Formation point towards an Albian age.

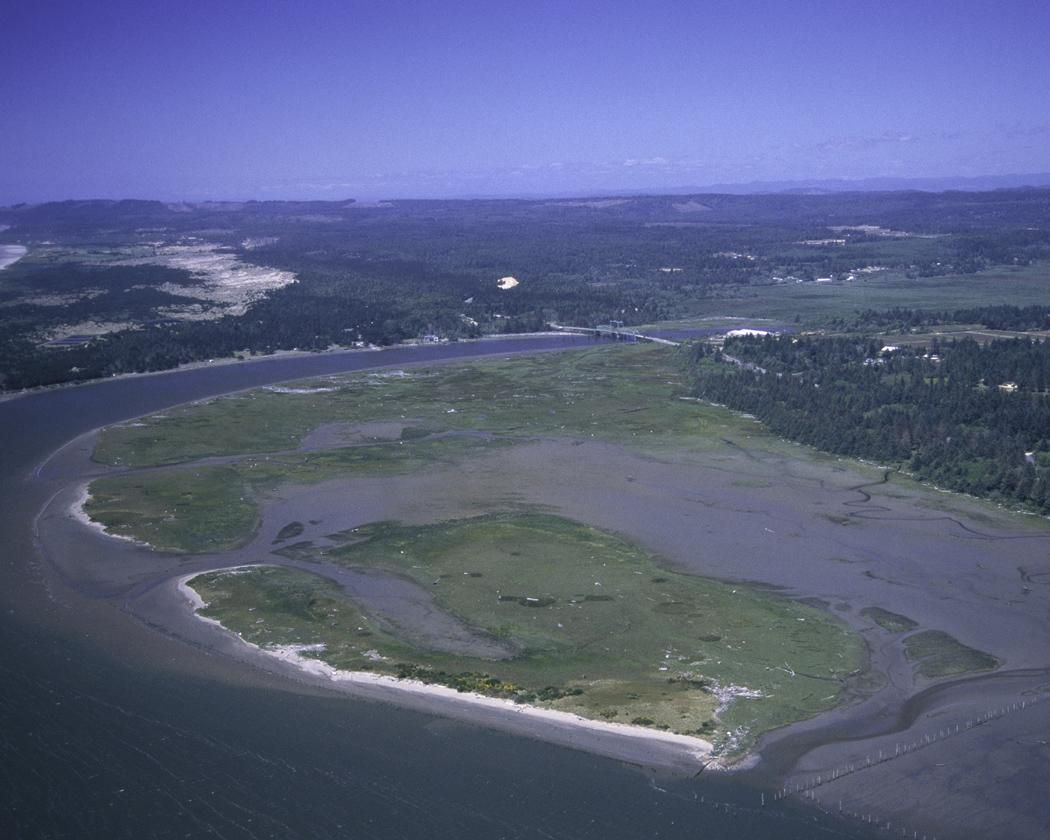
The depositional environment of the Guarujá Formation has been interpreted as a tidal flat, like this present-day example in Oregon, United States.

Guarujá Formation

The Guarujá Formation is 832 metres (2,730 ft) thick and consists of oolitic calcarenites, which laterally grade to greyish ochre and brownish grey calcilutites and grey marls. These facies are interbedded with the alluvial clastics of the Florianópolis Formation. The Guarujá name is restricted to the lowest limestone intercalation, previously named Lower Guarujá by Ojeda and Ahranha in Pereira and Feijó (1994). The microfacies indicate a tidal flat to shallow lagoon and open carbonate platform depositional environment. The age based on planktonic foraminifera and pollen is Early Albian.

Itanhaém Formation

The Itanhaém Formation is 517 metres (1,696 ft) thick and consists of dark grey shales, silts and light grey marls, ochre-brown calcisilts and subordinated sandstones. These facies change laterally into the coarse clastics of the Florianópolis Formation. Facies analysis indicates a marine environment ranging from sub-littoral (inner neritic) and more rarely to pelagic (outer bathyal) conditions. The age based on planktonic foraminifera and pollen is Early Albian.

==== IV – Frade Group (Turonian-Maastrichtian, middle post-salt sequence) ====
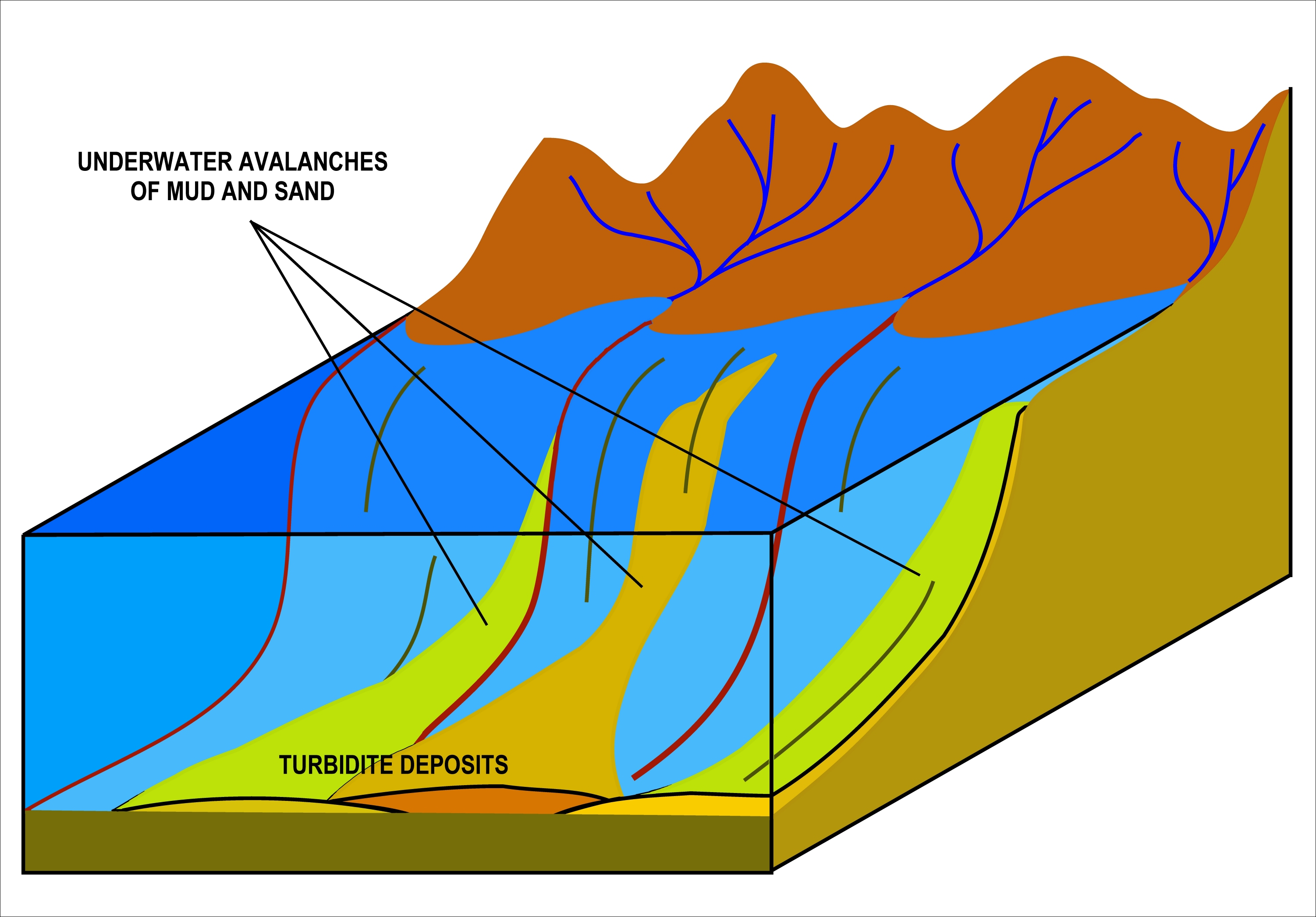
The Itajaí-Açu and Juréia Formations consist mainly of turbidites, formed at the base of the Brazilian marginal continental slopes. The sands of these formations have proven to be excellent reservoirs worldwide.

The Frade Group is 4,000 metres (13,000 ft) thick and includes three formations: Santos, Itajaí-Açu and Juréia. They predominantly comprise turbidites.

Santos Formation

The Santos Formation is 1,275 metres (4,183 ft) thick and consists of reddish lithic conglomerates and sandstones, interbedded with grey shales and reddish clays. These facies are interbedded and change laterally into the Itajai-Açu and Juréia Formations. The sedimentary environment is thought to be transitional continental to marginal marine, ranging from alluvial to braided rivers and deltas. Biostratigraphic data indicate a Late Cretaceous age (Cenomanian-Maastrichtian).

Itajaí-Açu Formation

The Itajaí-Açu Formation is 1,545 metres (5,069 ft) thick and comprises a thick interval of dark grey clayey rocks, interbedded with the clastics of the Santos and Juréia Formations. Within this formation, the Ilhabela Member includes the turbiditic sandstones occurring along the section. The sedimentary environment is thought to be marine talus to open basin. Biostratigraphic data from palynomorphs, calcareous nannofossils and planktonic foraminifera indicate a Late Cretaceous age (Cenomanian-Maastrichtian).

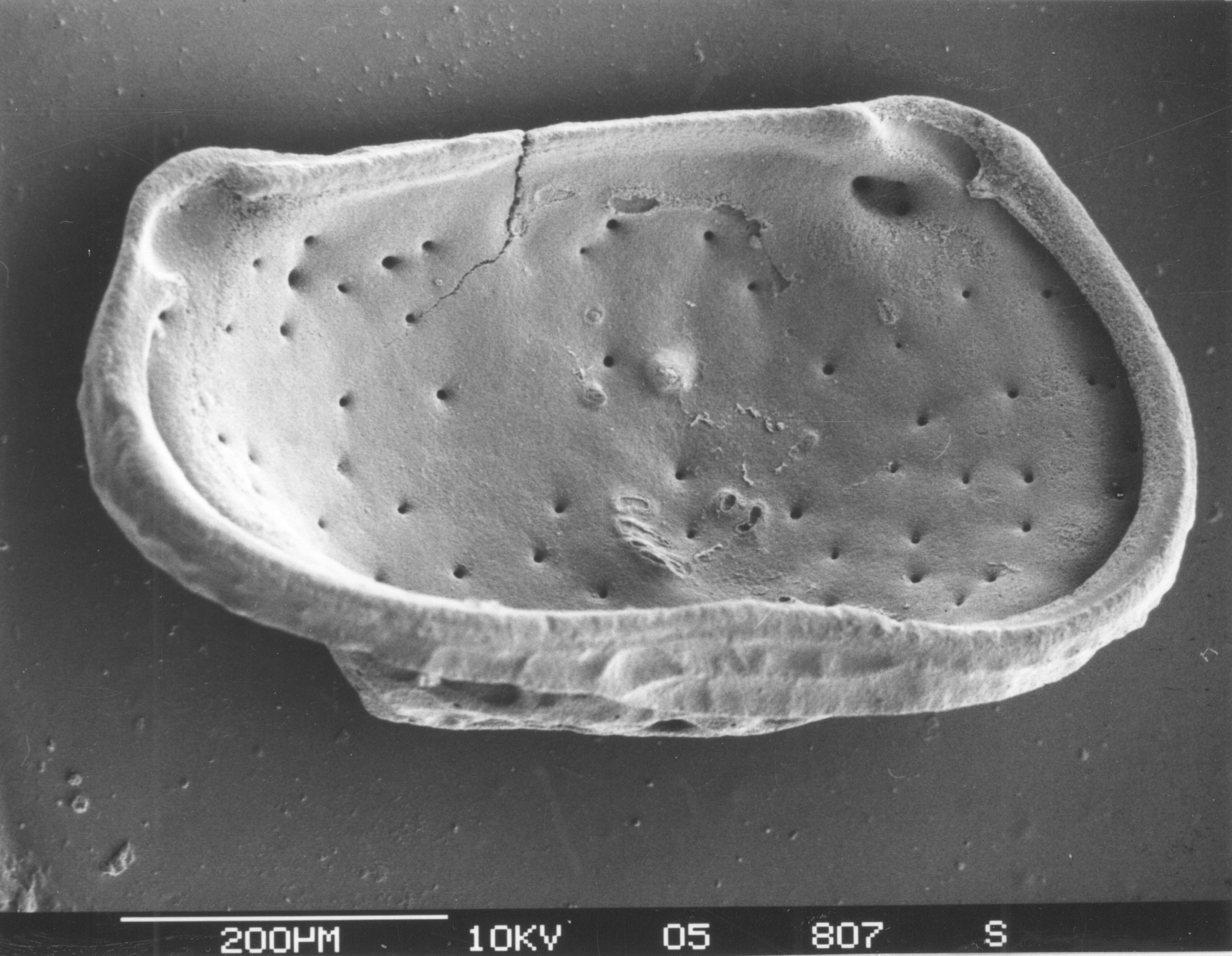
Ostracods are small crustaceans commonly used to identify paleo-environments and for age dating formations

Juréia Formation

The Juréia Formation is 952 metres (3,123 ft) thick and includes a succession of clastics between the coarse facies of the Santos Formation in the west and the fine-grained clastics of the Itajai-Açu Formation in the east. The formation is characterized by dark grey to greenish and brown shales, dark grey siltstones, fine-very fine sandstones and light ochre calcisilts. The depositional environment is thought to be of a marine platform setting. The age based on palynomorphs and calcareous nanofossils is Late Cretaceous (Santonian-Maastrichtian). Two new ostracod species were identified in the drilling cuttings of wells drilled into the Santonian-Campanian section, ?Afrocytheridea cretacea and Pelecocythere dinglei.

==== V – Itamambuca Group (Cenozoic, upper post-salt sequence) ====
Itamambuca Group is 4,200 metres (13,800 ft) thick and includes four formations, Ponta Aguda, Marambaia, Iguape and Sepetiba.

Ponta Aguda Formation

The Ponta Aguda Formation is up to 2,200 metres (7,200 ft) thick and consists of conglomerates, coarse to fine-grained sandstones interbedded with siltstones and shales. The dominant facies are coarse to fine-grained quartzitic sandstones. They range from reddish to grey, usually with calcite cements. Intercalated are reddish to light grey claystones and siltstones. They represent a fluvial to shallow marine environment.

Iguape Formation

The Iguape Formation is 1,103 metres (3,619 ft) thick and consists of bioclastic calcarenites and calcirudites, containing bryozoa, echinoids, corals, foraminifera, fragmented shells, and algae remains. They are interbedded with grey-greenish clays, siltstones, marls and variegated grey fine-to-medium grained conglomerates. These facies are interbedded with and change laterally to the Marambaia Formation. The depositional environment is thought to be a marine carbonate platform, influenced by the arrival of alluvial clastics in the most proximal areas. Biostratigraphic data from planktonic foraminifera, calcareous nanofossils and palynomorphs indicate a Tertiary age.

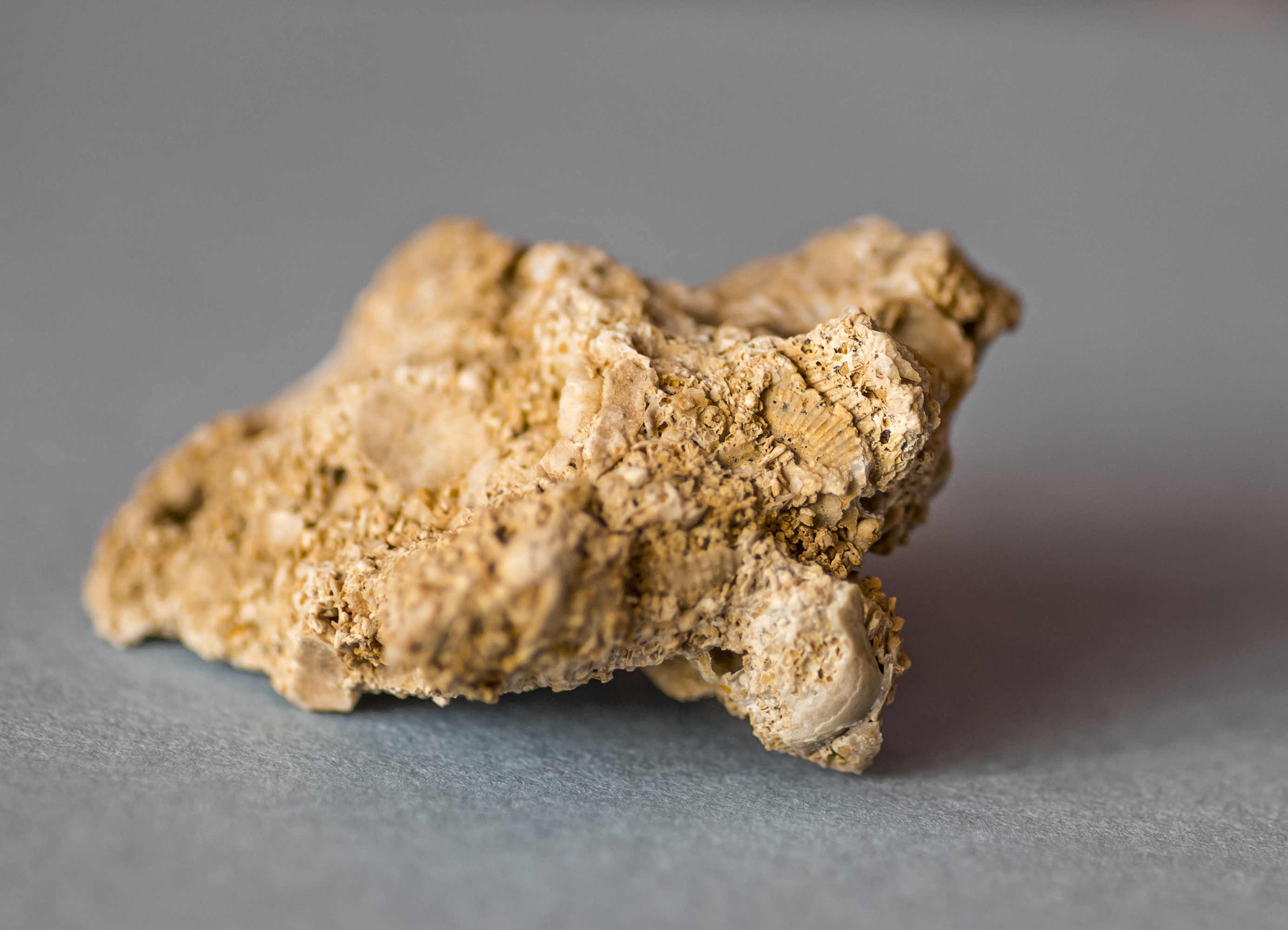
The uppermost sedimentary layer is formed by coquinas (similar to this sample from Crimea in Europe); carbonitic sandstones composed of broken shells

Marambaia Formation

The Marambaia Formation is 261 metres (856 ft) thick and consists of grey shales and light grey marls interbedded with fine-grained turbiditic sandstones. This formation in places can be found cropping out at sea bottom. The depositional environment is thought to be talus and open marine basin. Biostratigraphic data indicate a Tertiary age.

Sepetiba Formation (Pleistocene)

The Sepetiba Formation is the uppermost formation in the Santos Basin. It has a variable thickness due to the proximal erosion of the uppermost part. The formation consists of whitish grey fine to coarse grained carbonitic sands. They are feldspar-rich, glauconitic coquinas consisting of bivalve fragments and foraminifera. The depositional environment is thought to be coastal.

The stratigraphy following the classifications by Vieira 2007, Kiang Chang 2008 and Contreras 2011 is:

Age	Formations			Lithologies			Maximum thickness			Petroleum geology	Notes
Pleistocene	Sepetiba Fm.			Coquinas			570 m (1,870 ft)			Overburden	
Pliocene	Iguape Fm.	Marambaia Fm.		Shales, limestones, sandstones	Shales, sandstones		2,200 m (7,200 ft)		2,700 m (8,900 ft)	SEAL (Marambaia); RES (Marambaia)	
Miocene	Iguape Fm.	Marambaia Fm.		Shales, limestones, sandstones	Shales, sandstones		2,200 m (7,200 ft)		2,700 m (8,900 ft)	SEAL (Marambaia); RES (Marambaia)	
Oligocene	Iguape Fm.	Marambaia Fm.		Shales, limestones, sandstones	Shales, sandstones		2,200 m (7,200 ft)		2,700 m (8,900 ft)	SEAL (Marambaia); RES (Marambaia)	
Eocene	Iguape Fm.	Marambaia Fm.		Shales, limestones, sandstones	Shales, sandstones		2,200 m (7,200 ft)		2,700 m (8,900 ft)	SEAL (Marambaia); RES (Marambaia)	
Paleocene	Iguape Fm.	Marambaia Fm.		Shales, limestones, sandstones	Shales, sandstones		2,200 m (7,200 ft)		2,700 m (8,900 ft)	SEAL (Marambaia); RES (Marambaia)	
Maastrichtian	Santos Fm.	Juréia Fm.	Itajaí-Açu Fm.	Shales, sandstones	Sandstones	Shales, sandstones	2,700 m (8,900 ft)	2,000 m (6,600 ft)	2,000 m (6,600 ft)	SEAL (Itajaí-Açu); RES (Itajaí-Açu, Juréia); SR (Itajaí-Açu)	
Campanian	Santos Fm.	Juréia Fm.	Itajaí-Açu Fm.	Shales, sandstones	Sandstones	Shales, sandstones	2,700 m (8,900 ft)	2,000 m (6,600 ft)	2,000 m (6,600 ft)	SEAL (Itajaí-Açu); RES (Itajaí-Açu, Juréia); SR (Itajaí-Açu)	
Santonian	Santos Fm.	Juréia Fm.	Itajaí-Açu Fm.	Shales, sandstones	Sandstones	Shales, sandstones	2,700 m (8,900 ft)	2,000 m (6,600 ft)	2,000 m (6,600 ft)	SEAL (Itajaí-Açu); RES (Itajaí-Açu, Juréia); SR (Itajaí-Açu)	
Coniacian	Santos Fm.	Juréia Fm.	Itajaí-Açu Fm.	Shales, sandstones	Sandstones	Shales, sandstones	2,700 m (8,900 ft)	2,000 m (6,600 ft)	2,000 m (6,600 ft)	SEAL (Itajaí-Açu); RES (Itajaí-Açu, Juréia); SR (Itajaí-Açu)	
Turonian	Santos Fm.	Juréia Fm.	Itajaí-Açu Fm.	Shales, sandstones	Sandstones	Shales, sandstones	2,700 m (8,900 ft)	2,000 m (6,600 ft)	2,000 m (6,600 ft)	SEAL (Itajaí-Açu); RES (Itajaí-Açu, Juréia); SR (Itajaí-Açu)	
Cenomanian	Santos Fm.	Juréia Fm.	Itajaí-Açu Fm.	Shales, sandstones	Sandstones	Shales, sandstones	2,700 m (8,900 ft)	2,000 m (6,600 ft)	2,000 m (6,600 ft)	SEAL (Itajaí-Açu); RES (Itajaí-Açu, Juréia); SR (Itajaí-Açu)	
Late Albian	Florianópolis Fm.	Itanhaém Fm.		Sandstones	Shales		1,500 m (4,900 ft)			RES	
Early Albian	Florianópolis Fm.	Guarujá Fm.		Sandstones	Limestones		2,500 m (8,200 ft)			RES	
Early Albian	Ariri Fm.			Evaporites			2,500 m (8,200 ft)			SEAL	
Late Aptian	Ariri Fm.			Evaporites			2,500 m (8,200 ft)			SEAL	
Early Aptian	Guaratiba Gp.			Carbonates, sandstones, shales, volcanics			~1,500 m (4,900 ft)			SEAL, RES, SR	
Barremian	Guaratiba Gp.			Carbonates, sandstones, shales, volcanics			~1,500 m (4,900 ft)			SEAL, RES, SR	
Hauterivian	Camboriú Fm.			Basalt							
Valanginian											
Jurassic
Triassic
Paleozoic
Precambrian	Araçuarí Belt			Granites and gneisses						Basement	

== Basin analysis ==
4D Basin analysis of the Santos Basin has revealed insights about the interplay among the elements and processes of the petroleum system to assess source rock potential (vertical and horizontal distribution), thermal evolution of the source rocks, transformation ratio, hydrocarbon generation and charge, timing of migration, oil origin, quality, and volume of petroleum in the main reservoirs. In a basin modeling study performed in 2008 and 2009, a detailed facies model from the pre-salt section was built based on well data and conceptual models from seismic interpretation associated with previous knowledge of the tectono-sedimentary sequences of the Santos Basin. The predicted vitrinite map, integrated with all data, indicates that the Coquinas source rock in most of the eastern half area is in the main oil window, whereas the western half is in the late oil/wet gas generation window. In terms of transformation ratio, the Barremian and Aptian source rock systems in the area reached 70% to 80% today where the main depocentres are. The charge and accumulation simulation model for the pre-salt province suggests a potential reserve in the Cluster area of Santos Basin much larger than that reported, getting numbers to 60 billion barrels of oil reserves.

== Oil and gas exploration ==
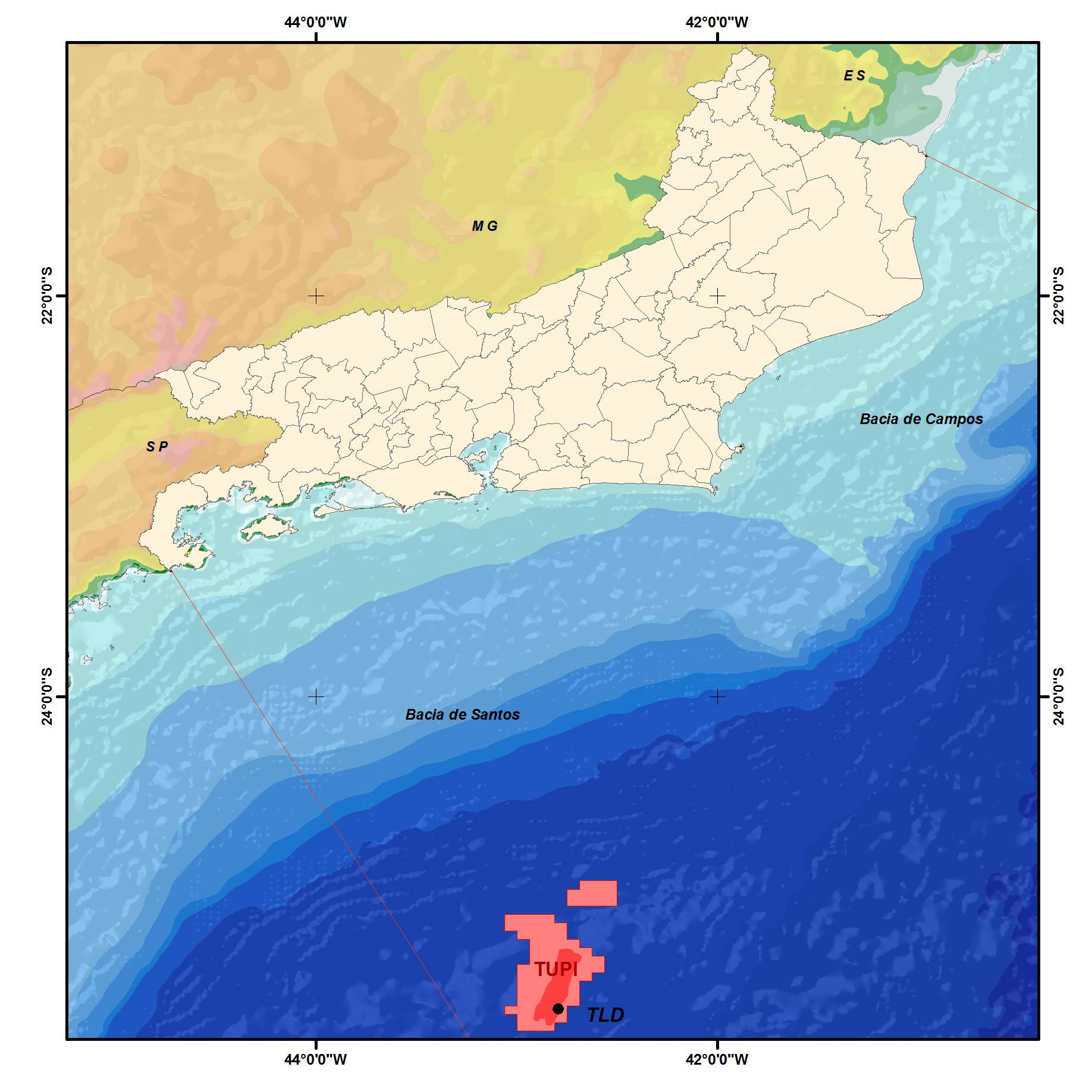
Location of the Tupi prospect

Exploration in the Santos Basin started in the 1970s. Between 1970 and 1987, 59 dry wells were drilled, with one discovery in Santonian turbidites in 1979, Merluza Field. From 1988 to 1998, 45 wells were drilled in the basin providing small discoveries, with the 30 million barrels (4.8 million cubic metres) of oil equivalent Tubarão Field discovered in 1988. Eighty-one wells were drilled from 1999 to 2005, leading to the discovery of the Mexilhão Field. Exploration boomed between 2006 and 2012, with 166 wells and the giant Tupi field (8 BBOE), discovered at the Tupi prospect in 2006. In 2013, the Sagitário Field was discovered in the sub-salt carbonates at a water depth of 1,871 metres (6,138 ft) and a true vertical depth of 6,150 metres (20,180 ft).

In 2014, the pre-salt reservoirs of the Santos Basin produced more than 250 thousand barrels per day (40×10^{3} m^{3}/d). Thanks to the pre-salt production, compensating for the declining post-salt production, the total oil production of Brazil rose above 2,500 thousand barrels per day (400×10^{3} m^{3}/d) in April 2016. The Lapa Field, originally named Carioca, was taken in production in December 2016. In 2017, the Santos Basin accounted for 35% of Brazil's oil, with the Campos Basin at 55%. In the same year, 76 blocks were open for bidding in the Santos Basin.

=== Oil and gas fields in the Santos Basin ===
Field bold is pre-salt	Reservoir	Year	Operator	Reserves (in place unless otherwise noted)	Notes
Echidna	"Paleocene-Maastrichtian"	2015	Karoon Energy Australia	75 million barrels (11.9 million cubic metres)	
Sagitário	Guaratiba Gp.	2013	Petrobras		
Libra	Guaratiba Gp.	2011	Petrobras	8,000–12,000 million bbl (1,300–1,900 million m^{3}) (recoverable)	
Búzios	Guaratiba Gp.	2010	Petrobras	3,058 million bbl (486 million m^{3})	
Iracema Sul		2009	Petrobras		
Panoramix	Itajaí-Açu Fm.	2009	Repsol	176 million bbl (28.0 million m^{3})	
Piracucá	Itajaí-Açu Fm.	2009	Petrobras	321.4 million bbl (51.1 million m^{3})	
Vampira		2009	Repsol		
Iara	Guaratiba Gp.	2008	Petrobras	3,000–4,000 million bbl (480–640 million m^{3})	
Iracema	Guaratiba Gp.	2008	Petrobras		
Júpiter	Guaratiba Gp.	2008	Petrobras	1,600 million bbl (250 million m^{3}); 17 trillion cu ft (480 billion m^{3})	
Sapinhoá	Guaratiba Gp.	2008	Petrobras	1,100–2,000 million bbl (170–320 million m^{3})	
Baúna		2008	Petrobras	113 million bbl (18.0 million m^{3})	
Piracaba		2008	Petrobras	83 million bbl (13.2 million m^{3})	
Lapa	Guaratiba Gp.	2007	Petrobras	459 million bbl (73.0 million m^{3})	
Tupi	Guaratiba Gp.	2006	Petrobras	8,000 million bbl (1,300 million m^{3})	
Belmonte		2005	Eni	158.4 million bbl (25.2 million m^{3})	
Cedro	Itajaí-Açu Fm.	2005	Petrobras	95.76 million bbl (15.2 million m^{3})	
Tambaú	Itanhaém Fm.	2005	Petrobras	1.6 trillion cu ft (45 billion m^{3})	
Lagosta	Itajaí-Açu Fm.	2003	El Paso Corp.	0.173 trillion cu ft (4.9 billion m^{3})	
Uruguá	Itajaí-Açu Fm.	2003	Petrobras	174.27 million bbl (27.7 million m^{3}); 1 trillion cu ft (28 billion m^{3})	
Carapiá	Itajaí-Açu Fm.	2002	Petrobras	63.52 million bbl (10.1 million m^{3})	
Atlanta	Marambaia Fm.	2001	QGEP	231.16 million bbl (36.8 million m^{3})	
Cavalo Marinho	Guarujá Fm.	2001	Petrobras	25.04 million bbl (3.98 million m^{3})	
Mexilhão	Itajaí-Açu Fm.	2001	Petrobras	532.23 million bbl (84.6 million m^{3}); 3.4 trillion cu ft (96 billion m^{3})	
Pirapitanga	Florianópolis Fm.	2001	Petrobras	54.24 million bbl (8.62 million m^{3}); 2.5 trillion cu ft (71 billion m^{3})	
Tambuatá	Itajaí-Açu Fm.	1999	Petrobras	212.8 million bbl (33.83 million m^{3})	
Oliva	Marambaia Fm.	1993	Shell	92.64 million bbl (14.7 million m^{3})	
Caravela	Guarujá Fm.	1992	Petrobras	48.81 million bbl (7.76 million m^{3})	
Caravela Sul	Guarujá Fm.	1991	Petrobras	5 million bbl (0.79 million m^{3})	
Coral	Guarujá Fm.	1990	Petrobras	22.57 million bbl (3.59 million m^{3})	
Estrela do Mar	Guarujá Fm.	1990	Petrobras	15.16 million bbl (2.41 million m^{3})	
Tubarão	Guarujá Fm.	1988	Petrobras	30 million bbl (4.8 million m^{3})	
Merluza	Juréia Fm.	1979	Pecten	0.074 trillion cu ft (2.1 billion m^{3})	

== See also ==
- Angola Basin
- Campos Basin
- Paraná Basin
- Geology of Namibia
