= Santosh (disambiguation) =

The word Santosh translates to "Satisfaction" or "Happiness" in several south asian languages. Its variants include:

- Santosh or Santhosh (Sanskrit: संतोष, Gujarati: સંતોષ,Punjabi: ਸੰਤੋਸ਼, Urdu: سنتوش)
- Shantosh (Bengali: সন্তোষ)
- Santosham or Santhosham (Tamil: சந்தோஷம், Telugu: సంతోషం),
- Santosha or Santhosha (Kannada: ಸಂತೋಷ),
- Sandosha (Malayalam: സന്തോഷം)

It may refer to:

== Name ==
- Santosh, a given name in India and Nepal, usually masculine, sometimes feminine.

== Places ==
- Santosh, Bangladesh
- Santoshnagar, Hyderabad, India
- Santoshpur (disambiguation)

== Others ==
- Santosh (1989 film), an Indian Hindi-language film
- Santosh (2024 film), an internationally produced Hindi-language film
- Santosh Trophy, annual football tournament in India
- Santhosh (actor), Indian film actor

== See also ==
- Santos (disambiguation)
- Santosham (disambiguation)
- Santoshi Maa (disambiguation)
