= Santos Formation =

Geological formation of the Santos Basin near Brazil

- Stratigraphic range: Cenomanian-Maastrichtian; ~100–66 Ma
- Type: Geological formation
- Unit of: Frade Group
- Underlies: Iguape Formation
- Overlies: Florianópolis Formation
- Thickness: up to 2,700 m (8,900 ft)

Lithology
- Primary: Conglomerate
- Other: Sandstone, shale

Location
- Coordinates: 26°6′S 43°43′W
- Region: Santos Basin, South Atlantic
- Country: Brazil

Type section
- Named for: Santos
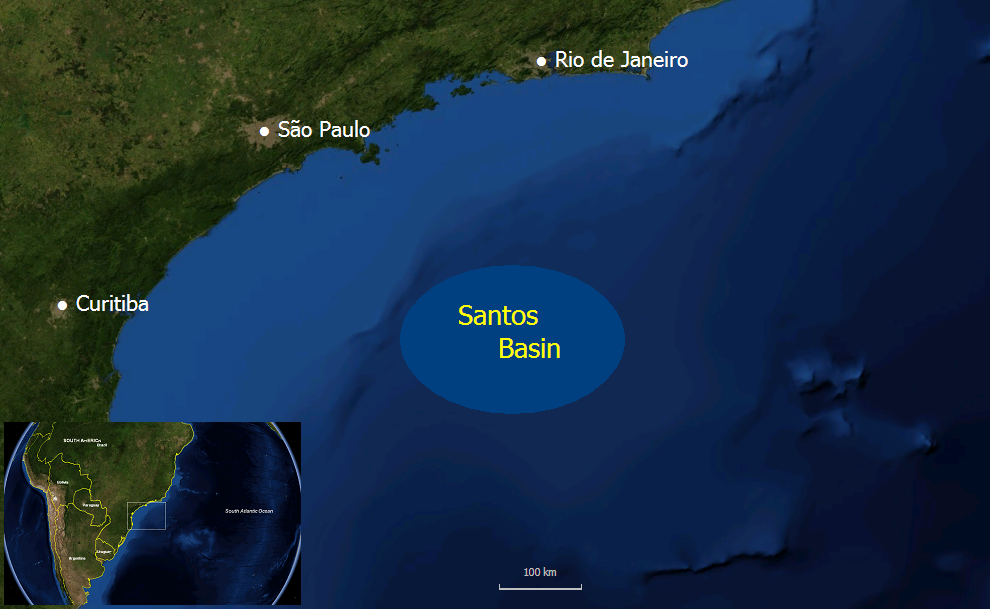
- Location of the Santos Basin

The Santos Formation (Portuguese: Formacão Santos) is a geological formation of the Santos Basin offshore of the Brazilian states of Rio de Janeiro, São Paulo, Paraná and Santa Catarina. The predominantly conglomeratic sandstone formation with interbedded shales dates to the Late Cretaceous period; Cenomanian-Maastrichtian epochs and has a maximum thickness of 2,700 metres (8,900 ft).

== Etymology ==
The formation is as the Santos Basin named after the city of Santos, São Paulo.

== Description ==
The Santos Formation is 1,275 to 2,700 metres (4,183 to 8,858 ft) thick, and consists of reddish lithic conglomerates and sandstones, interbedded with grey shales and reddish clays. These facies are interbedded and change laterally into the Itajai-Açu and Juréia Formations. The depositional environment is thought to be transitional continental to marginal marine, ranging from alluvial to braided rivers and deltas. Biostratigraphic data indicate a Late Cretaceous age (Cenomanian-Maastrichtian).

== See also ==
- Campos Basin
