= Restinga da Marambaia =

Landform in Rio de Janeiro, Brazil

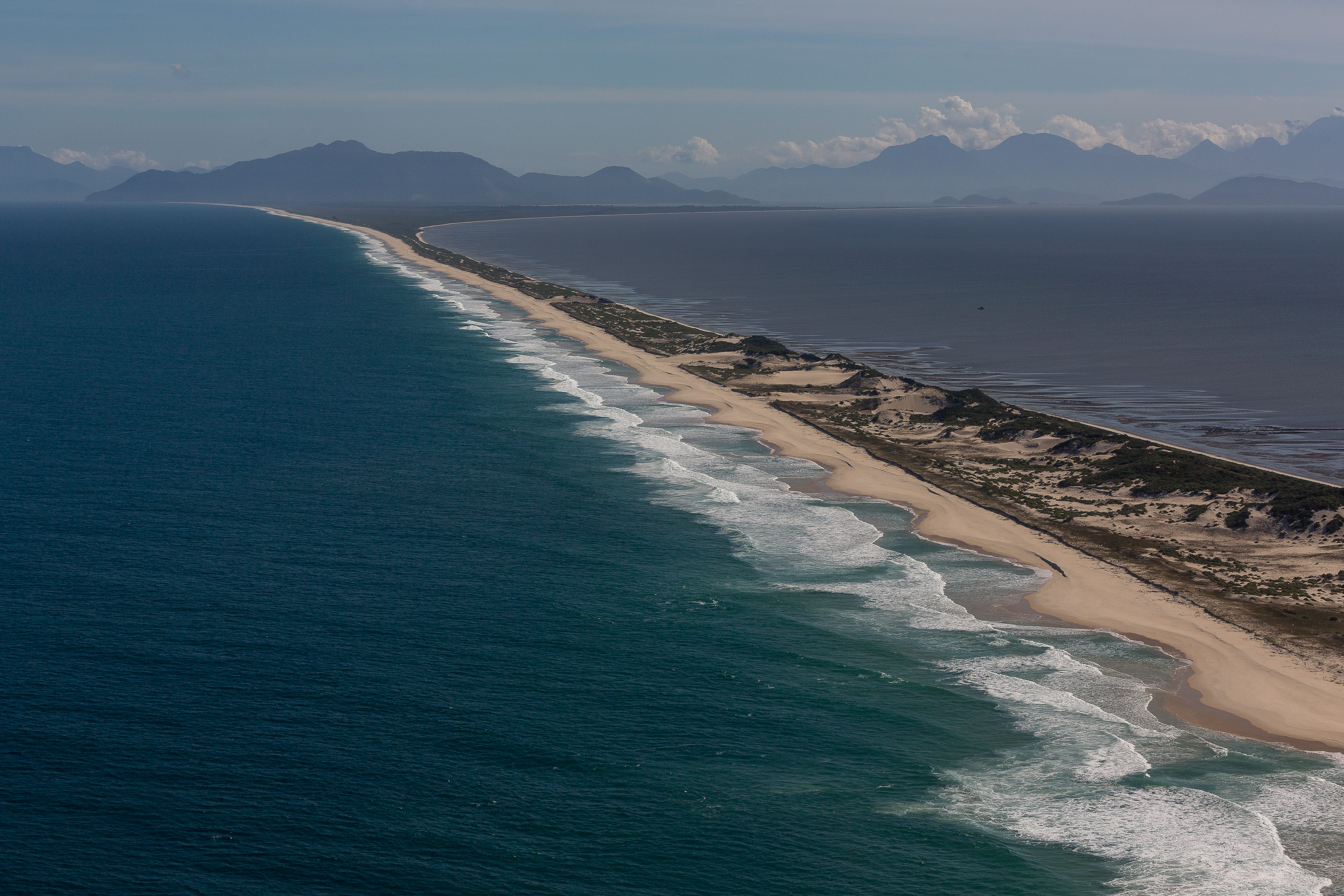
- Interactive map of Restinga da Marambaia

Geography
- Location: Atlantic Ocean
- Coordinates: 23°3′S 43°46′W

Administration
- Brazil
- State: Rio de Janeiro
- Municipalities: Rio de Janeiro, Itaguaí, and Mangaratiba

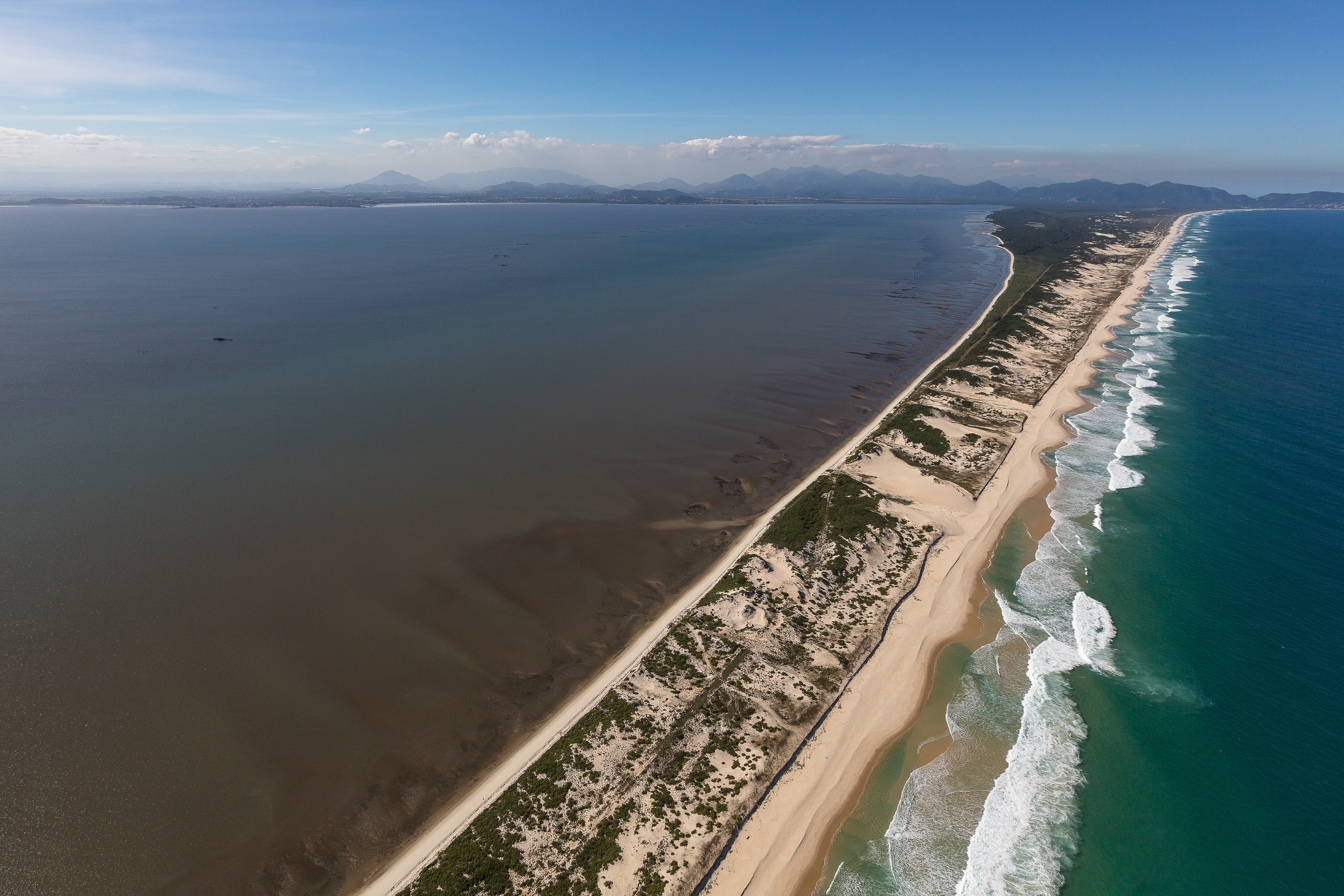
Aerial view of Restinga da Marambaia. Rio de Janeiro - Brazil.

The Restinga da Marambaia is a restinga and island on the coast of the Brazilian state of Rio de Janeiro. It is 42 km long and separates Sepetiba Bay from the Atlantic Ocean, being a part of the municipalities of Rio de Janeiro, Itaguaí and Mangaratiba.

It is managed by the Brazilian Navy, which uses it for live fire exercises. In 2014 a Quilombo was recognized on the island where about 100 families reside.

It has been used as a setting for several telenovelas, including Guerra dos Sexos and Da Cor do Pecado.
