= Dear Santa (1998 film) =

- Home video cover art
- Directed by: Fred Olen Ray
- Written by: Hamilton Underwood
- Produced by: Don Key
- Starring: D.L. Green; Harrison Myers; Debra Rich
- Cinematography: Theo Angell
- Edited by: Jeffrey Schwarz
- Music by: Butch Johnson
- Production company: Ardustry Home Entertainment
- Release date: January 1, 1998
- Running time: 90 minutes
- Country: United States
- Language: English

Dear Santa or Secret Santa is a 1998 American Christmas film directed by Fred Olen Ray and starring D.L. Green, Harrison Myers, and Debra Rich.

== Premise ==
A greedy workaholic father with little time for his family discovers the meaning of Christmas when he is whisked off to the North Pole by an enterprising elf named Lillith.

== Cast ==
- D.L. Green as Gordon / Gordon's Father
- Harrison Myers as Teddy
- Debra Rich as Carla
- Robert Quarry as Mr. Ambrose (credited as Robert Connell)
- Richard Gabai as Kirk
- Tena Fanning as Lillith
- Ariana McClain as Margo
- Bennett Curland as Santa Claus
- Kim Ray as The Elf
- Rick Montana as Louie
- Michael Lee Jones as Donny
- Edrie Warner as Mrs. Sanders
