= Itajaí-Açu Formation =

Geological formation offshore of Brazil

- Stratigraphic range: Cenomanian-Maastrichtian; ~100–66 Ma
- Type: Geological formation
- Unit of: Frade Group
- Underlies: Marambaia Formation
- Overlies: Itanhaém Formation
- Thickness: up to 2,000 m (6,600 ft)

Lithology
- Primary: Shale
- Other: Sandstone

Location
- Coordinates: 26°6′S 43°43′W
- Region: Santos Basin, South Atlantic
- Country: Brazil

Type section
- Named for: Itajaí-Açu River
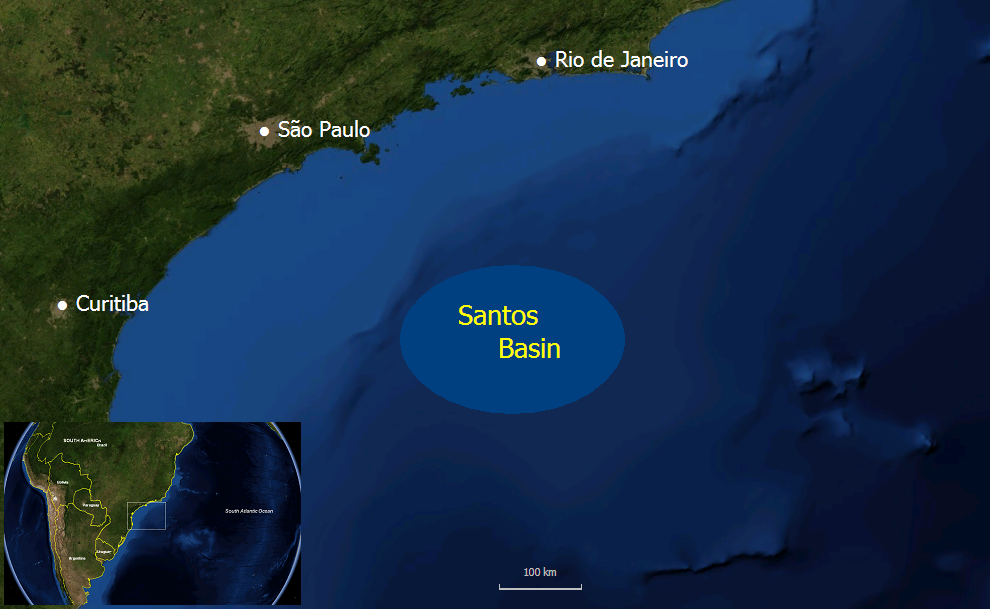
- Location of the Santos Basin

The Itajaí-Açu Formation (Portuguese: Formacão Itajaí-Açu) is a geological formation of the Santos Basin offshore of the Brazilian states of Rio de Janeiro, São Paulo, Paraná and Santa Catarina. The predominantly shale with interbedded turbiditic sandstones formation dates to the Late Cretaceous period; Cenomanian-Maastrichtian epochs and has a maximum thickness of 2,000 metres (6,600 ft). The formation is a reservoir rock of the fields in the Santos Basin.

== Etymology ==
The formation is named after the Itajaí-Açu River, Santa Catarina.

== Description ==
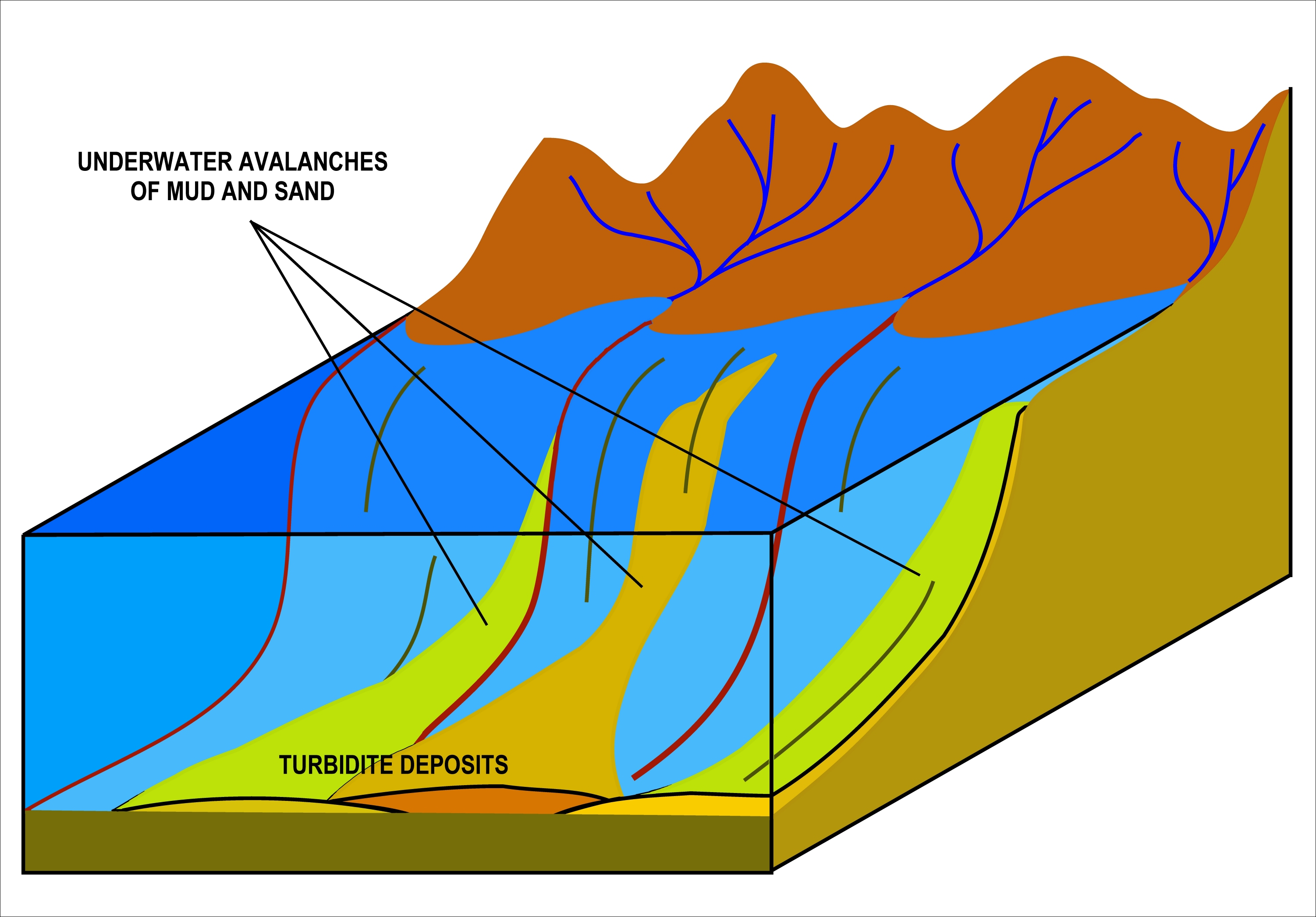
The Itajaí-Açu Formation consist mainly of turbidites, formed at the base of the Brazilian marginal continental slopes. The sands of this formation, called Ilhabela Member, host vast amounts of oil in the Santos Basin.

The Itajaí-Açu Formation is 1,545 to 2,000 metres (5,069 to 6,562 ft) thick, and comprises a thick interval of dark grey clayey rocks, interbedded with the clastics of the Santos and Juréia Formations. Within this formation, the Ilhabela Member includes the turbiditic sandstones occurring along the section. The sedimentary environment is thought to be marine talus to open basin. Biostratigraphic data from palynomorphs, calcareous nannofossils and planktonic foraminifera indicate a Late Cretaceous age (Cenomanian-Maastrichtian).

=== Petroleum geology ===
The formation, mainly its Ilhabela Member, is the main post-salt reservoir rock of the Santos Basin. The formation also is the main post-salt source rock and a seal for the post-salt reservoirs.

==== Fields with Itajaí-Açu reservoirs ====
Field	Year	Operator	Reserves (in place)	Notes
Panoramix	2009	Repsol	176 million bbl (28.0 million m^{3})	
Piracucá	2009	Petrobras	321.4 million bbl (51.1 million m^{3})	
Cedro	2005	Petrobras	95.76 million bbl (15.2 million m^{3})	
Lagosta	2003	El Paso Corp.	0.173 trillion cu ft (4.9 billion m^{3})	
Uruguá	2003	Petrobras	174.27 million bbl (27.7 million m^{3}); 1 trillion cu ft (28 billion m^{3})	
Carapiá	2002	Petrobras	63.52 million bbl (10.1 million m^{3})	
Mexilhão	2001	Petrobras	532.23 million bbl (84.6 million m^{3}); 3.4 trillion cu ft (96 billion m^{3})	
Tambuatá	1999	Petrobras	212.8 million bbl (33.8 million m^{3})	

== See also ==
- Campos Basin
