= Jureia Formation =

Geological formation of the Santos Basin near Brazil

- Stratigraphic range: Santonian-Maastrichtian; ~86–66 Ma
- Type: Geological formation
- Unit of: Frade Group
- Underlies: Marambaia Formation
- Overlies: Itanhaém Formation
- Thickness: up to 2,000 m (6,600 ft)

Lithology
- Primary: Shale
- Other: Siltstone, sandstone

Location
- Coordinates: 26°6′S 43°43′W
- Region: Santos Basin, South Atlantic
- Country: Brazil

Type section
- Named for: Jureia-Itatins Ecological Station
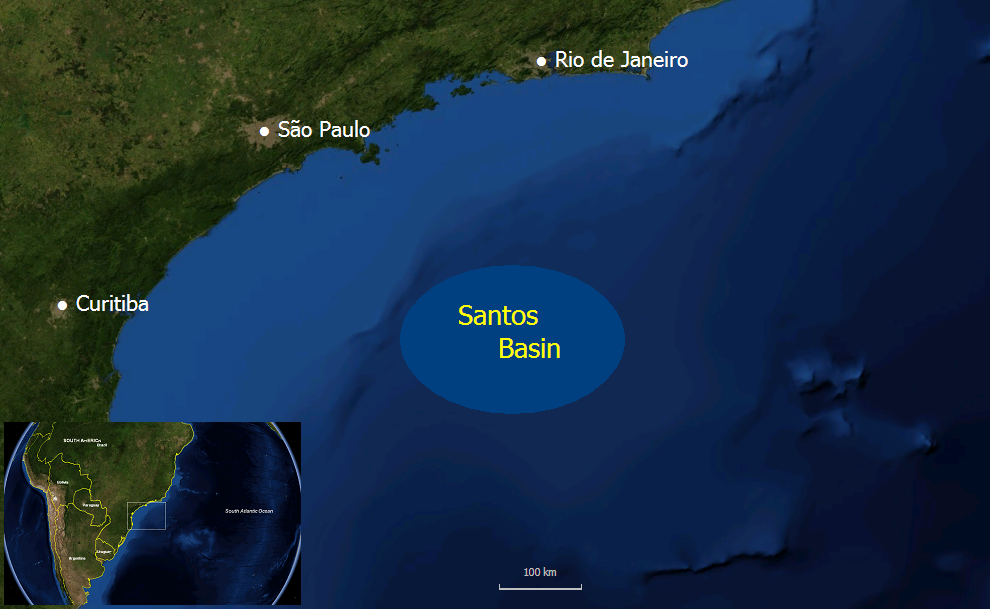
- Location of the Santos Basin

The Jureia Formation (Portuguese: Formacão Jureia) is a geological formation of the Santos Basin offshore of the Brazilian states of Rio de Janeiro, São Paulo, Paraná and Santa Catarina. The predominantly shale with interbedded siltstones and fine sandstones formation dates to the Late Cretaceous period; Santonian-Maastrichtian epochs and has a maximum thickness of 2,000 metres (6,600 ft). The formation is a reservoir rock of the Merluza Field, the first discovery in the Santos Basin.

== Etymology ==
The formation is named after the Jureia-Itatins Ecological Station, São Paulo.

== Description ==
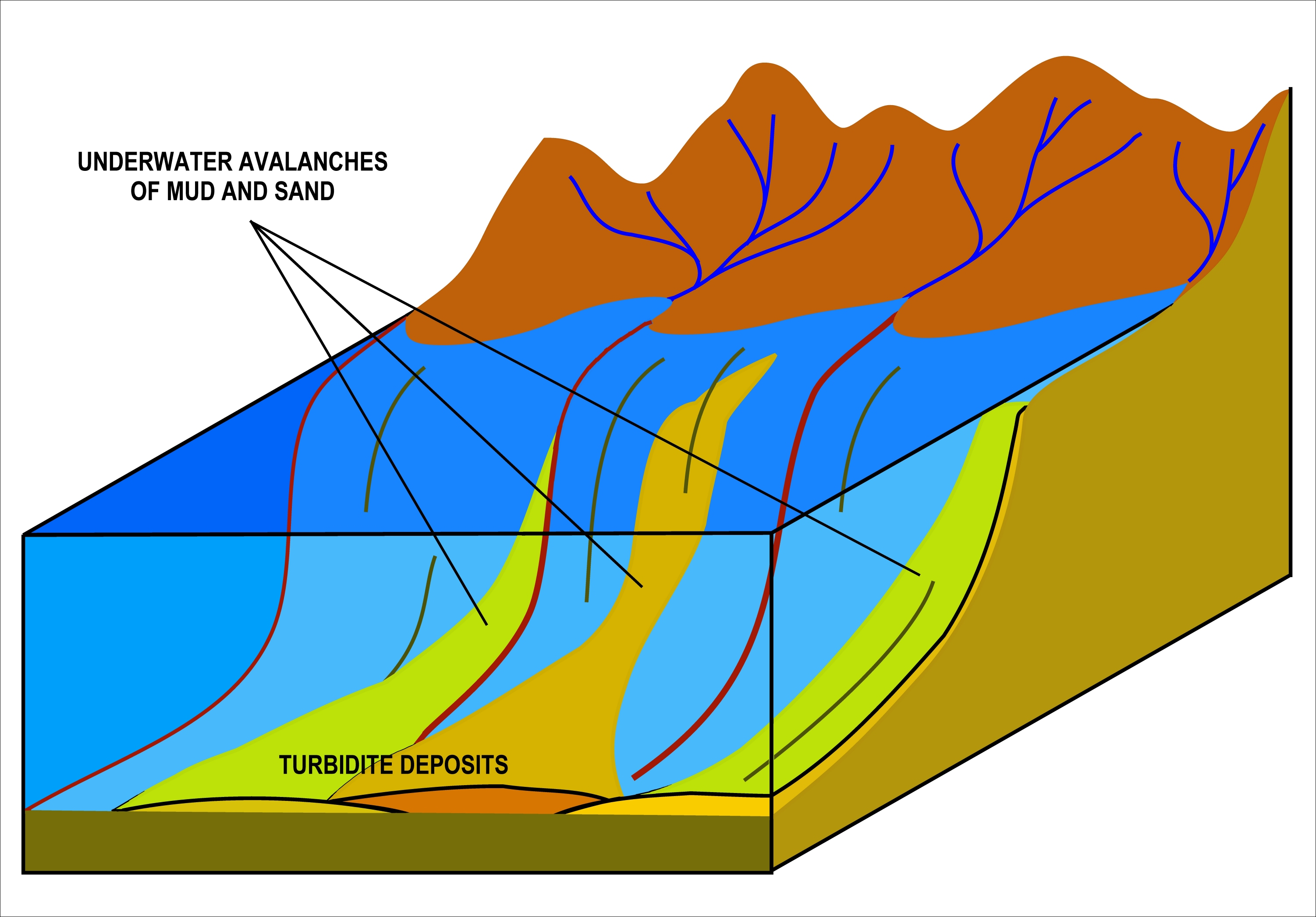
The turbidites of the Jureia Formation were deposited at the shelf edge of the Brazilian continental margin

The Jureia Formation is 952 to 2,000 metres (3,123 to 6,562 ft) thick, and includes a succession of clastics between the coarse facies of the Santos Formation in the western proximal part and the fine-grained clastics of the Itajai-Açu Formation in the eastern distal part of the Santos Basin. The formation is characterized by dark grey to greenish and brown shales, dark grey siltstones, fine-very fine sandstones and light ochre calcisilts. The depositional environment is thought to be of a marine platform setting as pro-delta facies on the shelf edge. The age based on palynomorphs and calcareous nannofossils is Late Cretaceous (Santonian-Maastrichtian). Two new ostracod species were identified in the drilling cuttings of wells drilled into the Santonian-Campanian section, ?Afrocytheridea cretacea and Pelecocythere dinglei.

The formation is the reservoir rock of the Merluza Field, the first discovery in 1979 of the Santos Basin.

== See also ==
- Campos Basin
