= Santina =

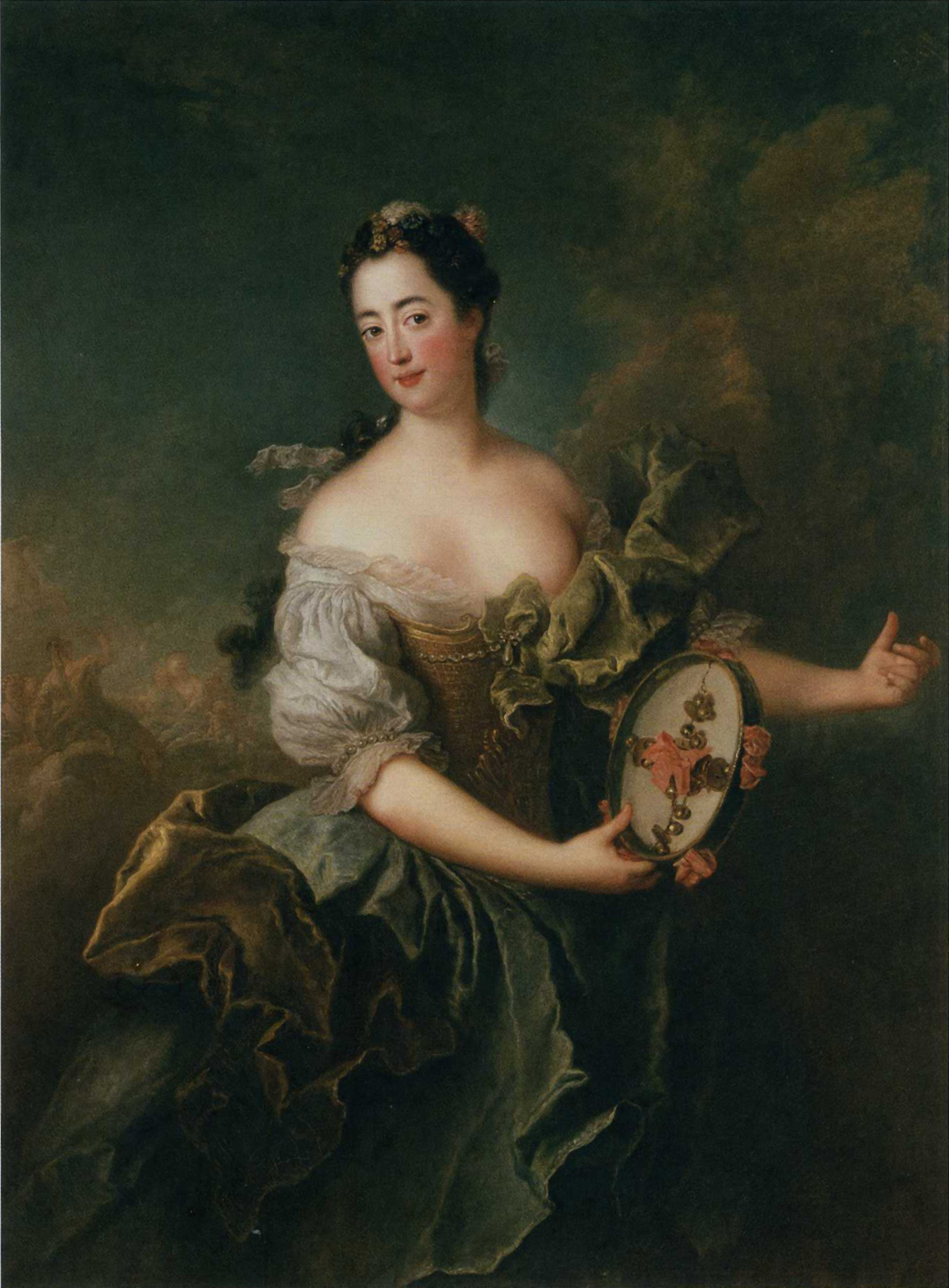
- Santina Olivieri by Antoine Pesne, 1753.
- Gender: Feminine
- Language: Italian

Origin
- Meaning: Little saint

Other names
- Related names: Saint, Sancha, Sanchia, Sancho, Sancia, Santino, Santo, Santos

Santina is an Italian feminine given name derived from the Latin sanctus, meaning saint or holy. It is a feminine form of Santo or diminutive Santino. Both names are diminutive forms with the connotation of "little saint."

== Women ==
- Santina Campana (1929–1950), Italian woman declared a Servant of God by the Roman Catholic Church
- Santina Cardoso (born 1975), East Timorese politician and public administrator
- Santina M. Levey (1938–2017), English costume and textiles historian, conservator, and author

== See also ==
- Santino Marella, ring name of Canadian professional wrestler Anthony 'Tony' Carelli (born 1974), who also has performed in drag as Santina Marella
