= Santi (surname) =

Santi or Santí or delli Santi or di Santi is a surname, and may refer to:

- Brenden Santi (born 1993), Australian-Italian rugby league footballer
- Domenico Santi (1621–1694), also known as il Mengazzino, Italian painter
- Emanuele Santi, Italian economist and political scientist
- Enrico Mario Santí, Cuban-American writer and scholar
- Franco Biondi Santi (1922–2013), Italian winemaker
- Giancarlo Santi (born 1939), Italian film director and screenwriter
- Giorgio Santi (1746–1822), Italian scientist
- Giovanni Santi (1435–1494), Italian painter and decorator, father of Raphael
- Guido Santi (1962–2019), Italian filmmaker, director and producer
- Giuseppe Santi (1729–1825), Italian painter
- Jacques Santi (1939–1988), French film producer
- Jenny Santi (born 1980), Filipino-born author and philanthropy adviser
- Marco Santi (born 1963), Italian artist, art restorer, businessman and mosaicist
- Nello Santi (1931–2020), Italian conductor
- Nicola Delli Santi (1970), Italian equestrian
- Nicola Rosini Di Santi (born 1959), French sculptor and painter
- Pietro Santi Bartoli (1615–1700), Italian engraver, draughtsman and painter
- Raphael or Raffaello Santi or Sanzio, the painter Raphael (1483–1520)
- Sebastiano Santi (1788–1866), Italian painter
- Simone Santi (born 1966), Italian volleyball referee
- Tom Santi (born 1985), American football player

== See also ==
- De Santi
- Sante
