= Sanchia =

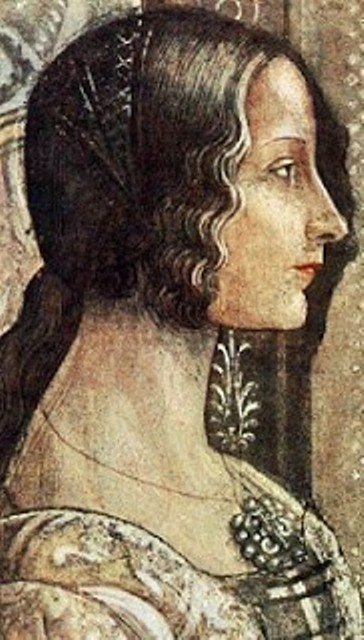
- Sancha of Aragon (1478–1506), also known as Sancia or Sanzia of Aragon
- Pronunciation: Spanish: [ˈsantʃa]
- Gender: Female
- Language: Spanish, Portuguese

Origin
- Language: Latin
- Meaning: 'saint', 'holy'

Other names
- Variant forms: Sancha, Sancharia, Sanche, Sanchee, Sanchie, Sancho, Sancia, Sància, Sancius, Sancta, Sancti, Sanctis, Sanctum, Sanctus, Sanctutius, Sanson, Sanxon, Santa, Sante, Santella, Santi, Santin, Santina, Santino, Santiz, Santo
- Related names: All Saints, de Todos los Santos, dos Santos, Sains, Saint, Sainte, Saintes, Saintine, Saints, Sanç, Sança, Sanceline, Sanceska, Santos, Santutius, Santuzza, Sanzia, Sânzia, Science, Sciencia, Scientia, Sence, Sens, Sense, Senses, Sentis, Xainte, Xaintes, Xaintine, Zanchy

Sanchia or Sancia is a feminine given name of Spanish and Portuguese origin from Latin sanctus or sancta, meaning holy or saint. The name, which has multiple forms, is the feminine version of the Spanish and Portuguese name Sancho.

== Usage ==
The name was in use in the Anglosphere and throughout Europe by the Middle Ages in multiple forms and all have been in occasional use in English-speaking countries since that time. Feminine variants used in the Anglosphere have included Saincte, Saint, Sainte, Saints, Sancha, Sanche, Sanchee, Sanchia, Sanchie, Sancia, Sancta, Sanctia, Sanzia, Sence, Sense, and Zanchy. Another source noted forms in use during the medieval era included Science, Sciencia, Scientia, and Senses.

French feminine variants Saincte, Sainte, Saintes, Seincte, Xainte, Xaintes, and diminutives Sancelina, Sanceline, Saintine, and Xaintine were also in use as given names in the French-speaking world in the 1500s. An Occitan version of the name is Sància, a feminine version of Sanç.

Italian masculine forms include Sante, Santi, Santino, and Santo, while Italian feminine forms include Santa, Santella, Santina, and Santuzza.

The name and its variants have traditionally been given to children of both sexes in reference to All Saints' Day. Some children have been given the full name All Saints, or Santos, dos Santos, or de Todos los Santos. For example, Spanish king Felipe IV and his daughters, Leonor, Princess of Asturias and Infanta Sofía of Spain, all have the name de Todos los Santos, or All Saints in English, as a middle name.

== Sanchia ==
- Sanchia of Provence (1225–1261), Queen of the Romans from 1257 until her death in 1261 as the wife of King Richard
- Sanchia Duncan, English former footballer

== Sancia ==
- Sancia of Aragon (1478–1506), also known as Sancha, Princess of Squillace
- Sancia of Majorca (c. 1285 – 28 July 1345), Queen of Naples
