= Sant (surname) =

Sant is a surname, and may refer to:

- Alfred Sant (born 1948), Maltese politician and novelist
- Andrew Sant (born 1950), Australian poet, essayist and editor
- David Sant (born 1968), Catalan director, actor and writer
- Girish Sant (1966–2012), Indian energy analyst
- Indira Sant (1914–2000), Indian poet
- James Sant (1820–1916), British painter
- Lorry Sant (1937–1995), Maltese politician
- Publio Maria Sant (1779–1864), Maltese Catholic prelate
- Toni Sant (born 1968), Maltese academic and journalist

== See also ==
- Van Sant (surname)
- Saint (surname)
- Sante
- Santi (surname)
- Santo (surname)
