= Santini =

Santini is an Italian surname. Notable people with the surname include:

- André Santini (1940–2026), French politician
- Bob Santini (born 1932), American basketball player
- Brandon Santini (born 1982), American blues harmonica player, singer and songwriter
- Chay Santini, Puerto Rican fashion model and actress
- Claudio Santini (born 1992), Italian football player
- Dalmazio Santini (1923–2001), Italian-born U.S. composer
- Daniele Santini (born 1992), Italian sprint canoeist
- Didier Santini (born 1968), French football player
- Edna Santini (born 1992), Brazilian rugby sevens player
- Fortunato Santini (1777–1861), Italian priest, composer and music collector
- Gabriel Santini (born 2000), Italian footballer
- Gabriele Santini (1886–1964), Italian conductor
- Giovanni Sante Gaspero Santini (1787–1877), Italian astronomer and mathematician
- Graziella Santini (born 1960), Sammarinese athlete
- Giuseppe Santini (1735–1796), Italian abbot and a mathematician
- Inti Muñoz Santini (born 1974), Mexican politician
- Ivan Santini (born 1989), Croatian footballer
- Jacques Santini, French footballer
- James David Santini (1937–2015), United States Representative from Nevada
- Jan Santini Aichel (1677–1723), Czech baroque architect of Italian descent
- Jorge Santini, Puerto Rican politician, former mayor of San Juan
- Krševan Santini (born 1987), Croatian football goalkeeper
- Nadia Santini, Italian chef
- Nilmaris Santini (1959–2006), Puerto Rican female judoka
- Norma Santini (born 1932), Venezuelan fencer
- Rinaldo Santini (1914–2013), Italian Christian Democrat politician
- Ruggiero Santini (1870–1958), Italian general
- Steven Santini (born 1995), American ice hockey defenseman
- Seven Santini Brothers, founders of the eponymous moving and storage company
- Wellentony Tafua Santini (born 1993), Australian rugby league footballer

== Fictional characters ==
- Dominic Santini, a character in the television series Airwolf
- Carla Santini, a character in the film/book Confessions of a Teenage Drama Queen

== See also ==
- 37699 Santini-Aichl, a minor planet discovered
- 4158 Santini, a minor planet
- Santini SMS, Italian cycling clothes brand
- Santini-Conti, professional continental cycling team registered in Italy
- Seven Santini Brothers, full-service American moving, storage, and relocation company
- The Great Santini (novel), written by Pat Conroy and published in 1976
- Santino, a male given name
- Santos (disambiguation)
- Satini, a given name and surname
