= 2017 NSW Cup finals series =

The 2017 New South Wales Cup, or the 2017 Intrust Super Premiership NSW Cup due to sponsorship reasons, began its finals on 2 September 2017 and ended with the Grand Final on 24 September.

== Ladder ==
| Pos | Team | Pld | W | D | L | B | PF | PA | PD | Pts |
|---|---|---|---|---|---|---|---|---|---|---|
| 1 | Wyong Roos | 22 | 16 | 2 | 4 | 3 | 622 | 437 | 185 | 40 |
| 2 | New Zealand Warriors | 22 | 13 | 4 | 5 | 3 | 558 | 424 | 134 | 36 |
| 3 | Penrith Panthers | 22 | 14 | 1 | 7 | 3 | 625 | 318 | 307 | 35 |
| 4 | Canterbury-Bankstown Bulldogs | 22 | 12 | 3 | 7 | 3 | 532 | 414 | 118 | 33 |
| 5 | Mount Pritchard Mounties | 22 | 11 | 2 | 9 | 3 | 523 | 468 | 55 | 30 |
| 6 | North Sydney Bears | 22 | 11 | 1 | 10 | 3 | 393 | 377 | 16 | 29 |
| 7 | Newcastle Knights | 22 | 10 | 1 | 11 | 3 | 526 | 558 | -32 | 27 |
| 8 | Illawarra Cutters | 22 | 10 | 1 | 11 | 3 | 480 | 558 | -78 | 27 |
| 9 | Wentworthville Magpies | 22 | 9 | 0 | 13 | 3 | 499 | 465 | 34 | 24 |
| 10 | Blacktown Workers Sea Eagles | 22 | 8 | 0 | 14 | 3 | 466 | 606 | -140 | 22 |
| 11 | Newtown Jets | 22 | 6 | 1 | 15 | 3 | 408 | 573 | -165 | 19 |
| 12 | Wests Tigers | 22 | 4 | 0 | 18 | 3 | 322 | 756 | -434 | 14 |

- Teams highlighted in green have qualified for the finals
- The team highlighted in blue has clinched the minor premiership
- The team highlighted in red has clinched the wooden spoon

== Bracket ==
Qualifying and elimination finals
Sydney Football Stadium
1 | Wyong | 34
4 | Canterbury | 26
Jubilee Oval
5 | Mount Pritchard | 26
8 | Illawarra | 30
Jubilee Oval
6 | North Sydney | 18
7 | Newcastle | 40
Jubilee Oval
2 | New Zealand | 20
3 | Penrith | 36

Semi-finals
Jubilee Oval
Canterbury-Bankstown | 32
Illawarra | 14
Jubilee Oval
New Zealand | 30
Newcastle | 6

Preliminary finals
Leichhardt Oval
Wyong | 16
New Zealand | 12
Leichhardt Oval
Penrith | 16
Canterbury-Bankstown | 12

Grand final
Leichhardt Oval
Wyong | 12
Penrith | 20

== Match details ==
=== Qualifying/ Elimination Finals ===
==== 1st Qualifying final ====
Saturday, 2 September
12:40PM

| Wyong Roos | 34 – 26 | Canterbury-Bankstown Bulldogs |
|---|---|---|
| Tries: Lindsay Collins (10') 1 Luke Sharpe (12') 1 Chris Smith (23') 1 Justin Toomey-White (47') 1 Brock Gray (56') 1 Paul Momirovski (81') 1 John Tuivasa-Sheck (84') 1 Goals: Paul Momirovski 3/7 (11', 25', 58') | 1st: 16 – 14; 2nd: 10 – 12; ET: 8 – 0 | Tries: 2 (18', 32') Tyrone Phillips; 1 (37') Rhyse Martin; 1 (42') Josh Cleeland; 1 (67') Renouf To'omaga; Goals: 3/5 Rhyse Martin (38', 43', 69') |

Allianz Stadium, Sydney
Referee: Chris Treneman

==== 1st Elimination final ====
Sunday, 3 September
12:00PM

| North Sydney Bears | 18 – 40 | Newcastle Knights |
|---|---|---|
| Tries: Abbas Miski (29') 1 Tautalatasi Tasi (37') 1 Bradley Deitz (65') 1 Eli Levido (72') 1 Goals: Eli Levido 1/4 (66') | 1st: 8 – 20; 2nd: 10 – 20 | Tries: 2 (16', 49') Brendan Elliott; 1 (4') Brady Smith; 1 (25') Nick Meaney; 1 (57') William Pearsall; 1 (68') Joseph Morris; Goals: 8/8 Nick Meaney (5', 18', 21' pen, 26', 51', 52' pen, 58', 69') |

Jubilee Oval, Sydney
Referee: Adam Cassidy

==== 2nd Elimination final ====
Sunday, 3 September
2:00PM

| Mount Pritchard Mounties | 26 – 30 | Illawarra Cutters |
|---|---|---|
| Tries: Michael Oldfield (25', 66') 2 William Cullen (3') 1 Yileen Gordon (52') 1 Scott Sorensen (56') 1 Goals: Maurice Kennedy 3/5 (5', 26' 57') | 1st: 12 – 16; 2nd: 14 – 14 | Tries: 2 (33', 78') Jai Field; 1 (36') Taane Milne; 1 (38') Sam Clune; 1 (44') Josh Kerr; Goals: 5/6 Jai Field (34', 40', 43' pen, 46', 80') |

Jubilee Oval, Sydney
Referee: Ziggy Przeklasa-Adamski

==== 2nd Qualifying final ====
Sunday, 3 September
4:00PM

| New Zealand Warriors | 20 – 36 | Penrith Panthers |
|---|---|---|
| Tries: Matthew Allwood (16') 1 Sam Cook (24') 1 Zac Santo (47') 1 Ligi Sao (79') 1 Goals: Fetalaiga Pauga 2/4 (49', 80') | 1st: 8 – 20; 2nd: 12 – 16 | Tries: 2 (1', 39') Tony Satini; 2 (55', 68') Jarome Luai; 1 (6') Maika Sivo; 1 (33') Christian Crichton; 1 (42') Jed Cartwright; Goals: 4/7 Darren Nichols (8', 40', 57', 70') |

Jubilee Oval, Sydney
Referee: Ryan Jackson

=== Semi-finals ===
==== 1st Semi-final ====
Sunday, 10 September
5:00PM

| Canterbury-Bankstown Bulldogs | 32 – 14 | Illawarra Cutters |
|---|---|---|
| Tries: Brad Abbey (58', 72') 2 Tyrone Phillips (26') 1 Thomas Carr (42') 1 Lachlan Lewis (49') 1 Goals: Rhyse Martin 6/6 (27', 44', 51', 59', 69' pen, 74') | 1st: 6 – 8; 2nd: 26 – 6 | Tries: 1 (7') Patrick Herbert; 1 (22') Izaac Thompson; 1 (64') Jordan Pereira; Goals: 1/3 Jai Field (65') |

Jubilee Oval, Sydney
Referee: Ziggy Przeklasa-Adamski

==== 2nd Semi-final ====
Sunday, 10 September
7:05PM

| New Zealand Warriors | 30 – 6 | Newcastle Knights |
|---|---|---|
| Tries: Zac Santo (49', 72') 2 Matthew Allwood (20') 1 Ata Hingano (34') 1 Bureta Faraimo (66') 1 Goals: Gustav Lino 4/5 (21', 36', 68', 74'); Fetalaiga Pauga 1/1 (49') | 1st: 12 – 0; 2nd: 18 – 6 | Tries: 1 (76') Curtis Naughton; Goals: 1/1 Nicholas Meaney (77') |

Jubilee Oval, Sydney
Referee: Chris Treneman

=== Preliminary Finals ===
==== 1st Preliminary final ====
Sunday, 17 September
1:05PM

| Wyong Roos | 16 – 12 | New Zealand Warriors |
|---|---|---|
| Tries: Joseph Manu (3', 48') 2 Jayden Nikorima (33') 1 Goals: Mitch Cornish 2/3 (4', 34') | 1st: 12 – 0; 2nd: 4 – 12 | Tries: 1 (52') Toafofoa Sipley; 1 (61') Jazz Tevaga; Goals: 2/2 Gustav Lino (53', 62') |

Leichhardt Oval, Sydney
Referee: Ziggy Przeklasa-Adamski

==== 2nd Preliminary final ====
Sunday, 17 September
3:15PM

| Penrith Panthers | 16 – 12 | Canterbury-Bankstown Bulldogs |
|---|---|---|
| Tries: Maika Sivo (6') 1 Tony Satini (27') 1 Christian Crichton (43') 1 Mitch Rein (51') 1 | 1st: 8 – 6; 2nd: 8 – 6 | Tries: 1 (36') Tyrone Phillips; 1 (77') Rhyse Martin; Goals: 2/2 Rhyse Martin (38', 78') |

Leichhardt Oval, Sydney
Referee: Chris Treneman

=== Grand Final ===
24 September
6:45 (AEST)

| Wyong Roos | 12-20 | Penrith Panthers |

Leichhardt Oval, Sydney
Attendance: 2,000

| FB | 1 | Luke Sharpe |
| WG | 2 | Johnny Tuivasa-Sheck |
| CE | 3 | Paul Momirovski |
| CE | 4 | Joseph Manu |
| WG | 5 | Chris Centrone |
| FE | 6 | Jayden Nikorima |
| HB | 7 | Mitch Cornish |
| PR | 8 | Lindsay Collins |
| HK | 9 | Mitchell Williams (c) |
| PR | 14 | Eloni Vunakece |
| SR | 11 | Brock Gray |
| SR | 12 | Justin Toomey-White |
| LK | 13 | Nat Butcher |
Interchange:
| BE | 10 | Chris Smith |
| BE | 15 | Grant Garvey |
| BE | 16 | Jake Lewis |
| BE | 17 | Brenden Santi |
Coach:
Rip Taylor

| FB | 1 | Mason Cerruto |
| WG | 2 | Maika Sivo |
| CE | 3 | Jed Cartwright |
| CE | 4 | Tony Satini |
| WG | 5 | Christian Crichton |
| FE | 6 | Jarome Luai |
| HB | 7 | Darren Nicholls (c) |
| PR | 8 | Kaide Ellis |
| HK | 9 | Mitch Rein |
| PR | 10 | Sitaleki Akauola |
| SR | 11 | Viliame Kikau |
| SR | 20 | Moses Leota |
| LK | 19 | Sione Katoa |
Interchange:
| BE | 12 | Corey Waddell |
| BE | 14 | Tom Eisenhuth |
| BE | 15 | Oliver Clark |
| BE | 16 | Nick Tui-Loso |
Coach:
Garth Brennan
