= Dreimane =

Dreimane is a surname. Notable people with the surname include:

- Anna Dreimane (born 1997), Latvian basketball player
- Santa Dreimane (born 1985), Latvian basketball player
