= Sony (disambiguation) =

Sony is a Japanese multinational conglomerate corporation.

Sony may also refer to:

== People ==
- Sony Dwi Kuncoro, former badminton singles player from Indonesia
- Sony Michel (born 1995), American former football running back
- Jean Sony (born 1986), Haitian footballer
- Warrick Sony (born 1958), South African composer

== Other uses ==
- Sony, Mali, a commune
- Sony Awards, former name of the Radio Academy Awards

== See also ==
- Sony Hall, a concert venue in Manhattan, New York
- SNY (disambiguation)
- Sonny (disambiguation)
