= Sonni =

Sonni may refer to:

- Sonni, Estonia, village in Türi Parish, Estonia
- Sonni Castle, historical castle located in Abarkuh County in Yazd Province,
- Sonni dynasty, dynasty of rulers of the Songhai Empire of medieval West Africa
- Sonni Bazar, village in Talang Rural District, Talang District, Iran

== People ==
- Jack Sonni (1954–2023), American writer, musician, and marketing executive, best known as "the other guitarist" of Dire Straits
- Sonni Ali, the 15th ruler of the Sunni dynasty of the Songhai Empire
- Sonni Balli (1982–2022), Ghanaian Dancehall artiste
- Sonni Baru, the 16th and last king of the Sonni dynasty to rule over the Songhai Empire
- Sonni Nattestad (born 1994), Faroese professional footballer
- Sonni Ogbuoji, Nigerian politician
- Sonni Gwanle Tyoden (1950–2025), Nigerian professor of political science, educational administrator, and politician

== See also ==
- Sonny (disambiguation)
