= Sancha (disambiguation) =

Sancha is a feminine given name. It may also refer to:

- Ciriaco María Sancha y Hervás (1833–1909), Spanish Roman Catholic cardinal, Archbishop of Toledo, Primate of Spain and Patriarch of the West Indies
- Sangenjaya, a district of Setagaya, Tokyo, Japan, also known as Sancha for short
- Sancha River, China

== See also ==
- Antonia de Sancha (born 1961), English actress, businesswoman and former mistress of British MP and cabinet minister David Mellor
- José Figueroa Sancha, former superintendent of the Puerto Rico Police Department and former deputy director of the Federal Bureau of Investigation in Puerto Rico
- Sanchia, a given name
