= Sonny =

Sonny is a common nickname and occasional given name. Often it can be a derivative of the English word "Son", a name derived from the Ancient Germanic element *sunn meaning "sun"; a nickname derived from the Italian names Salvatore, Santo, or Santino (mostly in North America amongst Italian Americans); or the Slavic male name Slavon meaning "famous or glorious" other variation John

Notable people with the name include:

== Athletes ==
- Sonny Anderson (born 1970), Brazilian retired footballer
- Sonny Alvarado, Puerto Rican basketball player
- Sonny Ates (1935–2010), American racecar driver
- Sonny Bishop (born 1939), American football player
- Sonny Chiba (1939–2021), Japanese martial artist and actor
- Sonny Gray (born 1989), American baseball pitcher
- Sonny Hertzberg (1922–2005), American basketball player
- Sonny Holland (1938–2022), American football coach and player
- Sonny Hutchins (1929–2005), stock car driver
- Sonny Jurgensen (1934–2026), American Hall-of-Fame National Football League quarterback
- Sonny Liles (1919–2005), American football player
- Sonny Liston (c. 1930–1970), American heavyweight boxer
- Sonny Milano (born 1996), American ice hockey player
- Sonny M'Pokomandji (born 1948), Central African former basketball player
- Sonny Parker (born 1955), American former basketball player
- Sonny Siebert (born 1937), American former baseball pitcher
- Sonny Silooy (born 1963), Dutch former footballer
- Sonny Styles (born 2004), American football player
- Sonny Weems (born 1986), American basketball player
- Sonny Bill Williams (born 1985), New Zealand former rugby player

== Jazz musicians ==
- Sonny Berman (1925–1947), American trumpeter
- Sonny Burke (1914–1980), American big band leader
- Sonny Clark (1931–1963), American pianist
- Sonny Cohn (1925–2006), American trumpeter
- Sonny Criss (1927–1977), American saxophonist
- Sonny Dallas (1931–2007), American bassist
- Sonny Fortune (1939–2018), American saxophonist and flautist
- Sonny Greenwich (born 1936), Canadian guitarist
- Sonny Greer (1895–1982), American drummer
- Sonny Payne (1926–1979), American drummer
- Sonny Red (1932–1981), American alto saxophonist
- Sonny Rollins (1930–2026), American saxophonist
- Sonny Sharrock (1940–1994), American guitarist
- Sonny Simmons (1933–2021), American saxophonist and English horn player
- Sonny Stitt (1924–1982), American saxophonist

== Other musicians ==
- Sonny Double 1, Welsh rapper
- Sonny Black, English singer/songwriter born William Boazman
- Sonny Bono (1935–1998), American singer, record producer and politician
- Sonny Burgess (1929–2017), rockabilly singer and guitarist
- Sonny Lim, Hawaiian musician and slack key guitar player.
- Sonny Chillingworth (1932–1994), slack-key guitar player from Hawaii
- Sonny Cunha (1879–1933), Hawaiian composer
- Sonny Curtis (1937–2025), American country and pop singer-songwriter
- Sonny Digital (born 1991), American record producer, rapper, and DJ
- Sonny Emory (born 1962), freelance touring and studio drummer
- Sonny James (1928–2016), stage name of American country music singer James Hugh Loden
- Sonny Kay (born 1972), founder of the record label Gold Standard Laboratories
- Sonny King (singer) (1922–2006), American lounge singer born Luigi Antonio Schiavone
- Sonny Landreth (born 1951), American blues guitar player
- Sonny Fredie Pedersen, Danish musician and actor
- Sonny Sanders (1939–2016), American soul music singer-songwriter, arranger, and producer
- Sonny Sandoval (born 1974), lead singer of rock band P.O.D.
- Sonny Terry (1911–1986), blind American blues musician born Saunders Terrell
- Sonny West (1937–2022), American rockabilly guitarist and songwriter
- Sonny Boy Williamson I a.k.a. John Lee Williamson (1914–1948), blues singer and harmonica player
- Sonny Boy Williamson II a.k.a. Aleck Ford "Rice" Miller (c.1912–1965), blues singer and harmonica player
- Sonny John Moore a.k.a. Skrillex, DJ Producer

== Other ==
- Sonny Vaccaro, American former sports marketing executive
- Sonny Angara (born 1972), Filipino politician
- Sonny Barger (1938–2022), founding member of the original Oakland, California, chapter of the Hells Angels motorcycle club
- Feliciano "Sonny" Belmonte Jr. (born 1936), Filipino politician
- Floyd "Sonny" Tillman, American founder of barbecue restaurant chain Sonny's BBQ
- Dominick Napolitano, also known as Sonny Black (1930–1981), capo in the Bonanno crime family
- Al Indelicato, also known as Sonny Red (1931–1981), another capo in the Bonanno crime family, killed during the same gangland war, in which the two led opposite sides
- Sonny Caldinez (1932–2022), Trinidadian actor
- Sonny Flood (born 1989), English actor who plays Josh Ashworth on Hollyoaks
- Sonny Grosso (1930–2020), police detective and movie producer from New York
- Sonny Franzese (1917–2020), underboss of the Colombo crime family
- Sonny Landham (1941–2017), American actor and stuntman
- Sonny Mehta (born Ajai Singh Mehta; 1942–2019), Indian book editor
- Sonny Montgomery (1920–2006), American politician
- Sonny Perdue (born 1946), U.S. Secretary of Agriculture and former Governor of Georgia
- Shridath Ramphal (1928–2024), commonly called "Sonny Ramphal" or "Sir Sonny", Guyanese politician and 2nd Commonwealth Secretary-General
- Sonny Shroyer (born 1935), American actor
- Sonny Venkatrathnam(1938-2019), South African human rights activist.
- Sonny West (1938–2017), American actor and stunt performer
- Harold G. White (born 1965), mechanical engineer, aerospace engineer, and applied physicist
- Lee Sung Jin, also known as Sonny Lee (born 1981), American filmmaker

== Fictional characters ==
- Sonny, a racer character in the Malaysian animated series Rimba Racer
- Sonny the Cuckoo Bird, the mascot for Cocoa Puffs breakfast cereal
- Sonny, a well tank locomotive from Thomas & Friends
- Sonny, a character in the 1994 American action thriller movie Raw Justice
- Sonny Bonds, protagonist of the first three Police Quest games
- Dominick "Sonny" Carisi, Jr., detective on Law & Order: Special Victims Unit
- Michael Sonny Corinthos, in the soap opera General Hospital
- Santino "Sonny" Corleone, in the film The Godfather, played by James Caan
- James "Sonny" Crockett, an undercover police detective in the action drama television series Miami Vice
- Sonny Forelli, in the video game Grand Theft Auto: Vice City
- Sonny Hayes, the main character in the film F1
- Jackson Sonny Kiriakis, on the soap opera Days of our Lives
- Sonny Koufax, the main character in the film Big Daddy, played by Adam Sandler
- Sonny LoSpecchio, the main character in the film A Bronx Tale, played by Chazz Palminteri
- Sonny Lumet, a character in the American television sitcom Bosom Buddies
- Allison Sonny Munroe, in Disney Channel Original Series Sonny with a Chance
- Sonny Spoon, a police detective character in the TV series Sonny Spoon
- Sonny Sumo, a supporting character of DC Comics' Forever People
- Simon Sonny Valentine, in the soap opera Hollyoaks
- Sonny Weaver, Jr., main character of the 2014 film Draft Day, played by Kevin Costner
- Sonny Wolff, the father of Nat and Alex Wolff in The Naked Brothers Band
- Sonny Wortzik, main character of Dog Day Afternoon, played by Al Pacino
- Sonny, a character in the 2021 Canadian-American movie Mister Sister
- Sonny, a character in 1986 the American fantasy drama film The Boy Who Could Fly
- Sonny, a robot in the film I, Robot

== See also ==
- Sunny (name), given name and surname
