= Barney Humphries =

Barney Humphries (ca. 1809 - 1875) was an A.M.E. minister and state legislator in South Carolina. He represented Chester County, South Carolina in the South Carolina House of Representatives from 1868 to 1872. in 1868 along with Sancho Sanders and Barney Burton. He and other African American state legislators were honored in a concurrent resolution in the South Carolina legislature in 2007.

He was documented as being mulatto and able to read but not write.

== See also ==
- African American officeholders from the end of the Civil War until before 1900
