= Mighty Mike =

Mighty Mike may refer to:

- A re-release of the computer game Power Pete
- Michael van Gerwen, darts player
- Mighty Mike McGee, slam poet
- Mike Anchondo, boxer
- Mike Arnaoutis, boxer
- Mike Van Sant, drag racer
- Mike Cuozzo, saxophonist
- "Mighty Mike C", a member of the Fearless Four
- Mighty Mike (TV series), a French CGI-animated series
