= Seven Brothers (disambiguation) =

Seven Brothers may refer to:

- Seven Brothers (islands), the English name given to the group of small islands off the east coast of the horn of Africa, in the Dact-el-Muyun, Yemeni, section of the Bab-el-Mandeb strait
- "Seven Brothers", in Christian hagiography, the sons of Saint Felicity of Rome
- Seven Brothers (Seitsemän veljestä), the 1870 Finnish novel
- Seven Brides for Seven Brothers, a 1954 Hollywood musical and stage production
- Calabash Brothers, the 1987 Chinese animation
- Seven Brothers (comic), a 2006 comic from John Woo and Virgin Comics
- Seven Santini Brothers, an international moving and relocation firm
- Seven Bro7hers, a brewing company in Salford, England
