= Lluís Juste de Nin =

Catalan fashion designer and illustrator (1945–2020)

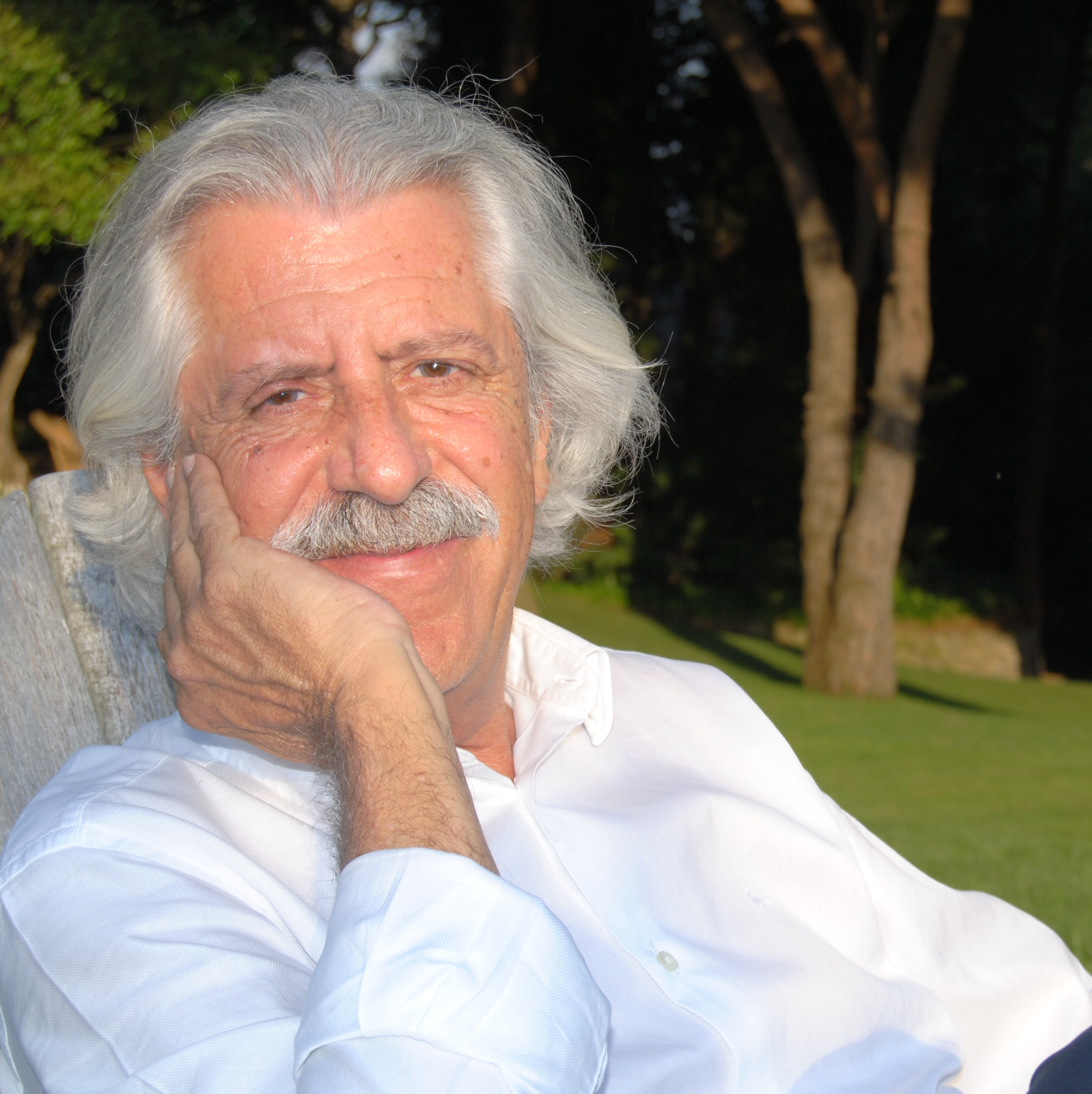
In 2014

Lluís Juste de Nin (1945 – 21 May 2020) was a Spanish illustrator, cartoonist and fashion designer. He worked as creative director for the Spanish fashion label Armand Basi. His work was first published in the 1960s. His cartoons were used in the publications of the political opposition to Francisco Franco. In these publications, Juste de Nin signed his work, "El Zurdo". For many years, he was engaged in creating illustrations for articles by Manuel Vázquez Montalbán in Mundo Obrero.

== Career ==
After the restoration of the Generalitat de Catalunya and ratification of the Spanish constitution of 1978, Juste de Nin was commissioned by the new Catalan Government to create a drawn character that, along with the texts of "Tísner", would form the basis of a campaign to normalise the Catalan language. The character he drew was La Norma. Through the 1980s, Juste de Nin contributed with a weekly page to the periodical magazine, Canigó in a series called Petant la xerrada which illustrated contemporary Catalan life. He signed these drawings, L’Esquerrà.

Member of a family of artists and creators, in 2004 appeared his first graphic novel, "Els Nin. Memòries a llapis d'una família catalana", published by Planeta-Agostini and Columna.

In 2006, Juste de Nin was commissioned to design the float for the "Three Kings Parade". The parade was dedicated to a "Year of the Book". On his float, a jubilant Don Quixote and Sancho stood surrounded by children holding giant crayons.

The characters rode on a large book illustrated with Rocinante’s head. Juste de Nin was the costume designer for the September 2008 world premiere of the opera, La Celestina at the Teatro de la Zarzuela in Madrid. He was also a member of the Cercle Catalanista de l'Ateneu Barcelonès, of the Foundation Andreu Nin; a partner at Òmnium Cultural; and member of the Patronat of the National Museum of Art in Catalonia.

In September 2008, he designed the costumes for the world premiere of the opera La Celestina by musician Joaquín Nin-Culmell, premiered at the Teatro de la Zarzuela in Madrid. He died on May 21, 2020 due to cancer.

== Selected works ==
- Croniques a Llapis (2007) – fiction series based on the history of Catalonia of the 19th and 20th centuries
- Montecristo 1941 (Edicions de Ponent) was a graphic novel based on Alexandre Dumas' work. It is set in Barcelona in the time of Francisco Franco beginning in 1941 and ending with the return of Josep Tarradellas.
- El Guepard 1970 (2008) is based on Giuseppe di Lampedusa's work. It examines Spain's transition to democracy, concluding with the failed coup d'état of Antonio Tejero in 1981.
- Barcelona 1931 (L'Educació Sentimental, 2009) is an adaptation of Gustave Flaubert's work. It is set in republican and revolutionary Barcelona and tells the story of Frederic Morell, a student of laws.
- El Quart Poder (2010) is an adaptation of Guy de Maupassant's Bel Ami. It is set in the 1920s Barcelona at the time of Miguel Primo de Rivera. It describes the world of the press, nocturnal life and canalla of the city.
- La Muntanya Magica (2011) is an adaption of Thomas Mann's work, set between 1900 and 1914.
- La Fira de les Vanitats (2012) is a revision of William Thackeray's Vanity Fair, set in the 1800s Barcelona.
- La Guerra dels Besavis (2013) is set in Catalonia in 1833. It is a story of love and war over a seven-year period, telling of "carlinda", "carlines" and "isabelins".
- Rauxa, la Catalunya Rebel, 1925 to 1931 (2014) is the story of "des Anées Folles", the exiles of Catalan to Paris during the reign of Miguel Primo de Rivera. A journalist, Pep Pubill must escape from Barcelona after a serious misunderstanding. He joins the Catalinist movement and journeys with Macià from the Prats-de-Mollo-la-Preste to Uruguay, Argentina, Cuba and New York City.
- Quan de tu S'Allunya, de l'ocupació de Paris a la caça de bruixes (2015). This story tells of the escape of Catalan people from German-occupied Paris in June 1940. It tells of the New York exiles such as "Met" Miravitlles, Fontsere (poster maker), "Shum" (anarchist cartoonist), Joaquim Maurin (founder of POUM) and the Pubils, the characters from Rauxa. In the United States, they find themselves under the threat of McCarthyism.
- Andreu Nin, siguiendo tus pasos (2016; editions in Catalan and Spanish), Andreu Nin immerses himself in the political and family life of Joaquim Maurin the Catalan revolutionary Marxist who founded POUM. Nin was assassinated in 1937 by Stalin's agents.
- Itaca (2016; edited by the Sant Jaume Cultural Society, Premià de Dalt) "The Odyssey” set in the Mediterranean of 1936. Designer of the costumes for the Don Juan musical, A Sangre y Fuego, with music by Mexican composer Antonio Calvo and under the artistic direction of Ignacio Garcia, which with Hispanic-Mexican production, premiered at the Luz Phillips theatre, Madrid on 6 October 2016.
- GARBO, El espía catalán que engañó a Hitler (2017; Trilita Ediciones; editions in Catalan and Spanish): This is a story of two Catalans, one fictional, Roger Corbella, and the other Joan Pujol “ Garbo”, a real person, who met at a young age while fighting in the terrible battle of the Ebro. Joan Pujol played an important role in the Second World War by deceiving Hitler into believing that the allied invasion would be in Calais and not Normandy.
- VERGÜENZA! (2018) "La grandeur touchée"
- EL NOI (2019) Salvador Seguí (El Noi del Sucre): Vida y muerte de un hombre libre.

== Graphic novels ==
- Els Nin (2004)
- Montecristo 1941 (2007)
- El Guepard1970 (2008)
- Barcelona 1931 (2009)
- El Quart Poder (2010)
- La Muntanya Magica (2011)
- La Fira de les Vanitats (2012)
- La Guerra dels Besavis (2013)
- Rauxa (2014)
- Quan de tu s' Allunya (2015)
- Itaca (2016)
- Andreu Nin (2016)
- Garbo, El espía catalán que engaño a Hitler (2017)
- Vergüenza! La grandeur touchée (2018)
- El Noi. (Salvador Seguí) Vida y muerte de un hombre libre (2019)

== Awards ==
In 2003, Juste de Nin received the Catalan presidents' Antoni Gaudi medal for creativity.

In 2010, he received an inaugural Nautilus prize at Comic City, Badalona, for his contribution to Catalan comics.
