= Gonzalo Escudero =

Gonzalo Escudero may refer to:

- Gonzalo Escudero (poet) (1903–1971), Ecuadorian poet and diplomat
- Gonzalo Escudero (footballer) (born 2007), Argentine footballer
