= Satini =

Satini is both a given name and a surname. Notable people with the name include:

- Satini Manuella (born 1958), Tuvaluan politician
- Tony Satini (born 1993), Tongan rugby league footballer

== See also ==
- Santini, a surname
