= Sonny (disambiguation) =

Sonny is a nickname and occasional given name. It may also refer to:

- Sonny (1922 film), an American drama
- Sonny (2002 film), an American crime drama
- alternate title of the song "Sonny's Dream"

== See also ==
- Sonny's BBQ, an American restaurant chain
- Sonni (disambiguation)
