= Van Sant (surname) =

Van Sant or van 't Sant or van't Sant is a surname, and may refer to:

- François van 't Sant (1883–1966), Dutch head-commissioner of police
- Gus Van Sant (born 1952), American film director and musician
- John Van Sant (1915–1972), American politician from Pennsylvania
- Joshua Van Sant (1803–1884), U.S. Representative and Mayor of Baltimore (1871–1875)
- Mike Van Sant, American drag racer
- Onno Hattinga van't Sant (born 3 May 1946), Dutch diplomat
- Peter Van Sant (born 1953), American reporter
- Samuel Rinnah Van Sant (1844–1936), Governor of Minnesota (1901–1905)
- Tom Van Sant (1931–2023), American artist

== See also ==
- Sant (surname)
