= Barney Burton =

American 19th century politician

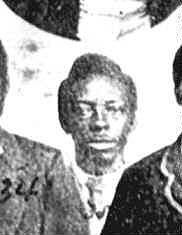

South Carolina House of Representatives
- In office 1868–?

Personal details
- Party: Republican

Barney Burton was an American legislator in South Carolina. He served in the South Carolina House of Representatives in 1868 and 1870. He represented Chester County, South Carolina.

Burton was involved with the Chester A.M.E. Baptist church in its early days.

Burton was a delegate to the South Carolina Constitutional Convention of 1868. He represented Chester County in the South Carolina House of Representatives in 1868 along with Sancho Sanders and Barney Humphries.

== See also ==
- African American officeholders from the end of the Civil War until before 1900
