= Santo (surname) =

Santo is a surname. Notable people with the surname include:

- Akiko Santō (born 1942), Japanese politician
- Anthony Santo (c. 1894–?), Italian-American murderer
- Audrey Santo (1983–2007), or Little Audrey, through whom miracles were said to have happened
- Damián de Santo (born 1968), Argentine actor
- Guillermo Santo (born 1982), Argentine footballer
- Hildi Santo-Tomas (born 1961), American interior designer and television personality
- Ron Santo (1940–2010), American baseball player and broadcaster
