= Giovanni Antonio Baruffaldi =

Italian painter

Giovanni Antonio Baruffaldi (1793–1832) was an Italian painter. He was born in Ferrara, and there initially trained under Giuseppe Santi, but also was a painter in the city of Venice. He received a stipend from the commune of Ferrara to study in Rome. There he died young after falling from a scaffold. The gallery of Ferrara possesses some of his work: Virgin reading and Tancred and Armida. It is not clear how Giovanni Antonio is related to the fellow Ferrarese Girolamo Barufaldi, who published a biography of the town's artists.

== Sources ==
- Bryan, Michael (1886). Robert Edmund Graves (ed.). Dictionary of Painters and Engravers, Biographical and Critical. Vol. I: A-K. London: George Bell and Sons. p. 90.
