= Santa (given name) =

- Gender: Female

Origin
- Origin: derived either from Latin sanctus (holy) or from Aleksandra
- Region of origin: Latvia

Santa is a given name. As a Latvian feminine given name, the name day of people named Santa is September 14.

== Notable people with the given name Santa ==
- Santa Blumberga (born 1994), Latvian curler and curling coach
- Santa Dimopulos (born 1987), Ukrainian singer, former member of the Ukrainian musical group Nu Virgos
- Santa Dreimane (born 1985), Latvian basketball player
- Santa Montefiore (born 1970), English writer
- Santa Ratniece (born 1977), Latvian composer
- Santa Reyes, Dominican singer-songwriter known professionally as Santaye
- Santa J. Ono (born 1962), a Canadian-American biologist and university administrator.
