= Jane Toppan =

American serial killer (1854–1938)

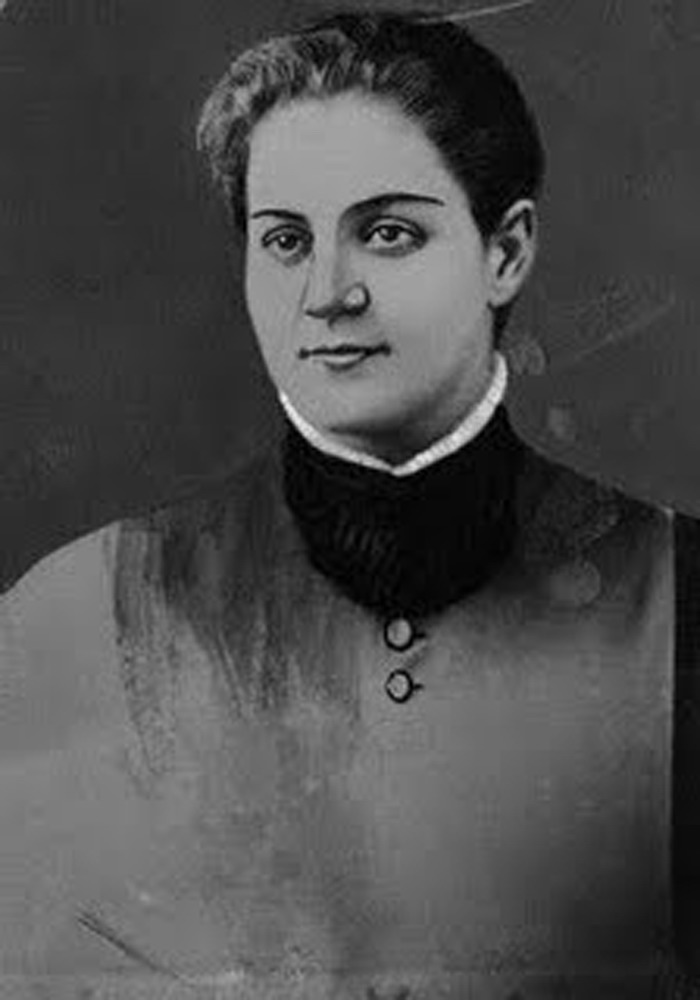
- Born: Honora Kelley; March 31, 1854; Boston, Massachusetts, U.S.
- Status: Deceased
- Died: August 17, 1938 (aged 84); Taunton, Massachusetts, U.S.
- Other name: Jolly Jane
- Motive: Sexual fetishism; Possible jealousy (her foster sister)
- Criminal charge: Murder (x12)
- Verdict: Not guilty by reason of insanity
- Penalty: Involuntary commitment to a mental hospital for life

Details
- Victims: 12 confirmed, 31 confessed, 100+ suspected
- Span of crimes: 1895–1901
- Country: U.S.
- State: Massachusetts
- Date apprehended: October 29, 1901; 125 years ago

Jane Toppan (born Honora Kelley; March 31, 1854 – August 17, 1938), nicknamed Jolly Jane, was an American serial killer who murdered 12 people in Massachusetts between 1895 and 1901, although she confessed to killing 31 and is suspected of killing more than 100. The killings were carried out in Toppan's capacity as a nurse, targeting patients and their family members. Toppan, who admitted to having committed the murders to satisfy a sexual fetish, was quoted as saying that her ambition was "to have killed more people—helpless people—than any other man or woman who ever lived".

== Early life ==
Jane Toppan was born Honora Kelley on March 31, 1854, in Boston, Massachusetts, the daughter of Irish immigrants. Her mother, Bridget Kelley, died of tuberculosis when she was very young. Her father, Peter Kelley, was well known as an eccentric and abusive alcoholic, nicknamed by those who knew him "Kelley the Crack" (as in "crackpot"). In later years, Kelley was said to have sewn his own eyelids closed while working as a tailor.

In 1860, only a few years after his wife's death, Kelley surrendered his two youngest children, eight-year-old Delia Josephine and six-year-old Honora, to the Boston Female Asylum, an orphanage for indigent female children; he never saw them again. Documents from the asylum note that Delia and Honora were "rescued from a very miserable home". No records exist of their experiences during their time in the asylum, but reportedly, Delia became a prostitute while their older sister Nellie (who was not committed to the orphanage) was committed to an insane asylum.

In November 1862, less than two years after being abandoned by her father, Honora was placed as an indentured servant in the home of Mrs. Ann C. Toppan of Lowell, Massachusetts. Though never formally adopted by the Toppans, Honora took on the surname of her benefactors to distance herself from her former family and eventually became known as Jane Toppan. The original Toppan family already had a daughter, Elizabeth, with whom Honora was on good terms.

== Murders ==
In 1883, Toppan began training to be a nurse at Cambridge Hospital. Unlike her early years, where she was described as brilliant and terrible, at the hospital she was well-liked, bright, and friendly, earning her the nickname "Jolly Jane". Once she became close with the patients, she picked her favorite ones, who were normally elderly and very sick. During her residency, Toppan used her patients as guinea pigs in experiments with morphine and atropine; she altered their prescribed dosages to see what it did to their nervous systems. However, she spent considerable time alone with patients, making up fake charts, medicating them to drift in and out of consciousness, and even getting into bed with them.

Toppan was recommended for the prestigious Massachusetts General Hospital in 1889; there, she claimed several more victims before being fired the following year. She briefly returned to Cambridge but was soon dismissed for administering opiates recklessly. Toppan then began a career as a private nurse and flourished despite complaints of petty theft.

Toppan began her poisoning spree in earnest in 1895 by killing her landlord, Israel Dunham, and his wife. In 1899 she killed her foster sister Elizabeth with a dose of strychnine. In 1901, Toppan moved in with the elderly Alden Davis and his family in Cataumet to take care of him after the death of his wife, Mattie (whom Toppan had murdered). Within weeks, she killed Davis, his sister Edna, and two of his daughters, Minnie and Genevieve.

The surviving members of the Davis family ordered a toxicology exam on Minnie, which determined that she had been poisoned. Local authorities assigned a police detail on Toppan to watch her. On October 29, 1901, she was arrested for murder. By 1902, she had confessed to thirty-one murders.

Soon after the trial, one of William Randolph Hearst's newspapers, the New York Journal, printed what was purported to be Toppan's confession to her lawyer, claiming that she had killed more than thirty-one people, and that she wanted the jury to find her sane so she could eventually have a chance at being released. Toppan insisted upon her own sanity in court, claiming that she could not be insane if she knew what she was doing and knew that it was wrong, but nonetheless she was declared insane and committed. On June 23, 1902, in the Barnstable County Courthouse, she was found not guilty by reason of insanity and committed for life in the Taunton Insane Hospital. She died there on August 17, 1938, at the age of 84.

== Victims ==
Victims Toppan identified are:

- Israel Dunham: patient, died on May 26, 1895, aged 83
- Lovely Dunham: patient, died on September 19, 1897, aged 87
- Elizabeth Brigham: foster sister, died on August 29, 1899, aged 70
- Mary McNear: patient, died on December 29, 1899, aged 70
- Florence Calkins: housekeeper for Elizabeth, died on January 15, 1900, aged 45
- William Ingraham: patient, died on January 27, 1900, aged 70
- Sarah (Myra) Connors: patient and friend, died on February 11, 1900, aged 48
- Edna Bannister: sister-in-law of Elizabeth, died on June 19, 1901, aged 77
- Mattie Davis: Wife of Alden Davis, died on July 4, 1901, aged 62
- Genevieve Gordon (Annie): daughter of Alden and Mattie Davis, died on July 30, 1901
- Alden Davis: died on August 8, 1901, aged 64
- Mary (Minnie) Gibbs: daughter of Alden and Mattie, died on August 13, 1901, aged 40

== Motives ==
An article in the Hoosier State Chronicles, published shortly after the arrest, reported that Toppan would fondle her victims as they died and attempt to see the inner workings of their souls through their eyes. Under questioning, she stated she derived a sexual thrill from patients being near death, coming back to life and then dying again. Toppan administered a drug mixture to the patients she chose as her victims, lay with them, and held them close as they died.

Toppan is often considered an "angel of mercy", a type of serial killer who takes on a caretaker role and attacks the vulnerable and dependent, though she also murdered for seemingly more personal reasons, such as in the case of the Davis family. It is possible Toppan was also motivated by jealousy, in the case of the murder of her foster sister. She later described her motivation as a paralysis of thought and reason, a strong urge to poison.

Toppan used poison for more than just murder, reportedly poisoning a housekeeper just enough so that she appeared drunk in order to steal her job and kill the family. She even poisoned herself to evoke the sympathy of men who courted her.

== See also ==
- Serial killers with health related professions
- List of serial killers in the United States
- List of serial killers by number of victims

== Bibliography ==
- Lane, Brian; Gregg, Wilfred (1995). The Encyclopedia of Serial Killers. Berkley Books. ISBN 978-0-425-15213-3.
- Laurence, John (1931). Extraordinary Crimes. Low, Marston.
- McBrayer, Mary Kay (May 19, 2020). America's First Female Serial Killer: Jane Toppan and the Making of a Monster. Mango Media Inc. ISBN 978-1-64250-208-4.
- Nash, J.R. (1981). Look for the Woman: A Narrative Encyclopedia of Female Poisoners, Kidnappers, Thieves, Extortionists, Terrorists, Swindlers, and Spies, from Elizabethan Times to the Present. M. Evans. ISBN 978-0-87131-336-2.
- Schechter, Harold (2003). Fatal: The Poisonous Life of a Female Serial Killer. Simon and Schuster. ISBN 978-0-671-01450-6.
- Vronsky, Peter (August 7, 2007). Female Serial Killers: How and Why Women Become Monsters. Penguin. ISBN 978-0-425-21390-2.
