= Santino =

- Gender: Male
- Language: Italian

Origin
- Meaning: Little saint, holy

Santino is an Italian masculine given name or nickname, meaning “little saint” in Italian. It is a diminutive version of the given name Santo, meaning “saint” or “holy”. The name is highly popular in Argentina, the United States, and its native Italy. Notable people with the name include:

- Santino Andino (born 2005), Argentine footballer
- Santino Barbi (born 2005), Argentine footballer
- Santino Basaldella (born 2004), Argentine surfer
- Santino Ferrucci (born 1998), American race car driver
- Santino Fontana (born 1982), American actor
- Santino Garsi (1542–1604), Italian lutenist and composer
- Santino William Legan (1999–2019), American criminal
- Santino Marella (born 1974), ring name of WWE wrestler Anthony Carelli
- Santino Mazzucchelli (born 2004), Argentine basketball player
- Santino Quaranta (born 1984), American soccer player
- Santino Rice (born 1974), American fashion designer
- Santino Solari (1576–1646), Swiss architect
- Santino Sposito (born 2002), Argentine beach handball player
- Santino Vera (born 2006), Argentine footballer
- Santino Zangara (born 2004), Argentine rugby sevens player

== Fictional characters and nicknames ==
- Santino (The Vampire Chronicles), a fictional character in the Vampire Chronicles.
- Sonny Corleone, a fictional character in Mario Puzo's 1969 novel The Godfather and its 1972 film adaptation.
- Santino Guillermo and Santino A. Dimaguiba, fictional characters in the 2009–2013 religious drama series and Philippine live television adaptation of the 1955 Spanish film Miracle of Marcelino May Bukas Pa and 2023–2026 action drama series FPJ's Batang Quiapo both by ABS-CBN, respectively.
  - Zaijian Jaranilla and Ronwaldo Martin, both also known as Santino outside show business work, actors that played the characters on respective shows.

== Other ==
- Santino (chimpanzee), a chimpanzee first observed to have the cognitive skills for forward planning and killed while escaping his enclosure

== See also ==
- Santini, a surname
