= Gonzalo Escudero (footballer) =

Argentine footballer (born 2007)

Personal information
- Date of birth: 1 April 2007 (age 19)
- Place of birth: Avellaneda, Buenos Aires, Argentina
- Height: 1.80 m (5 ft 11 in)
- Position: Central defender

Team information
- Current team: Racing
- Number: 43

Youth career
- 2010–2023: Racing

Senior career*
Years	Team	Apps	(Gls)
2023–	Racing	13	(1)

International career^{‡}
2023–	Argentina U17	3	(0)
- * Club domestic league appearances and goals as of 18:16, 8 November 2026 (UTC) ‡ National team caps and goals as of 25 August 2023

Gonzalo Escudero (born 1 April 2007) is an Argentine professional footballer who plays as a central defender for Racing.

== Club career ==
Born in Avellaneda in the Buenos Aires Province of Argentina, Escudero began his footballing career at the age of three with La Academia, the academy of Racing. Despite being born in 2007, he trained with the 2005-born squad, two years his senior, and progressed through the academy before signing his first professional contract in March 2023.

On 18 August 2023, he was summoned by manager Fernando Gago to the Racing first team for the first time, ahead of a Copa de la Liga Profesional fixture against Unión de Santa Fe. The following week he made his professional debut, coming on as a late substitute for Santino Vera in a 2–1 win against Tigre on 26 August. In doing so, he became the second youngest player in Racing history at 16 years, 4 months and 25 days, behind only Rubén Saa, who debuted in 1971 at the age of fifteen.

== International career ==
Escudero has represented Argentina at under-17 level. He featured at the 2023 South American U-17 Championship as Argentina finished in fourth place.

== Personal life ==
Escudero's brother, Matías, is also a footballer, and currently plays for Paraguayan club General Díaz.

== Career statistics ==
=== Club ===
As of 27 August 2023.

Appearances and goals by club, season and competition
Club	Season	League			National Cup		League Cup		Continental		Other		Total	
Club	Season	Division	Apps	Goals	Apps	Goals	Apps	Goals	Apps	Goals	Apps	Goals	Apps	Goals
Racing	2023	Argentine Primera División	0	0	0	0	1 (Note: Appearances in the Copa de la Liga Profesional)	0	0	0	0	0	1	0
Career total			0	0	0	0	1	0	0	0	0	0	1	0
