= Taunton State Hospital =

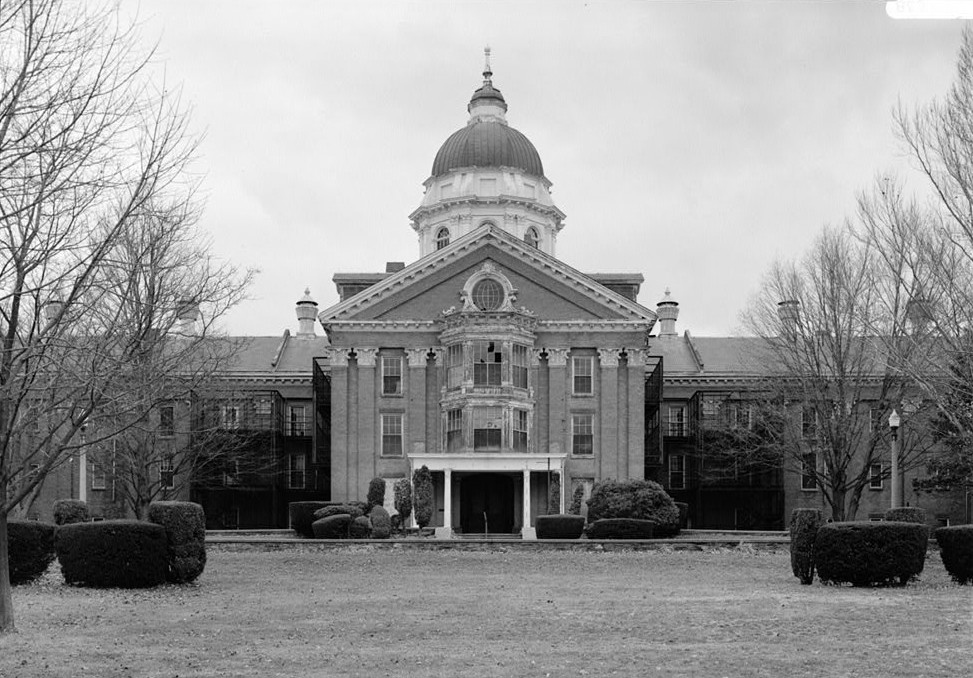
- 1987 photo of the Administration Building (since demolished)

Geography
- Location: Taunton, Massachusetts, United States

Organization
- Type: Specialist

Services
- Speciality: Psychiatric hospital

History
- Former name: State Lunatic Hospital at Taunton
- Opened: 1854
- Closed: 1975

Links
- Lists: Hospitals in Massachusetts
- Taunton State Hospital
- U.S. National Register of Historic Places
- Location: Taunton, Massachusetts
- Coordinates: 41°54′42.79″N 71°6′2.02″W
- Built: 1854
- Architect: Boyden & Ball
- Architectural style: Neo-classical
- NRHP reference No.: 93001484
- Added to NRHP: February 21, 1994

Taunton State Hospital is a psychiatric hospital located on Hodges Avenue in Taunton, Massachusetts. Established in 1854, it was originally known as the State Lunatic Hospital at Taunton. It was the second state asylum in Massachusetts. Most of the original part of the facility was built in a unique and rare neo-classical style designed by architects Boyden & Ball. It is also a Kirkbride Plan hospital and is located on a large 154-acre (62 ha) farm along the Mill River.

The complex was expanded at various times to include over forty buildings and structures. The main part of the hospital (known as "the Kirkbride Building") closed in 1975, and the buildings fell into disrepair. In 1994, the property was added to the National Register of Historic Places as a historic district. In 1999, the main dome of the administration building collapsed. In 2006, a large part of the historic complex was destroyed by fire. In 2009, the remaining parts were demolished. However, many of the newer buildings on the campus remain.

== History ==
In 1851, the Massachusetts General Court appointed a commission to find a site for a new asylum to relieve the pressure of a rising patient population from its only facility in Worcester. The new facility at Taunton opened in April 1854. The large sprawling campus located on a hill offered fresh air and sunlight, following Kirkbride's concept for treating mental health patients. The complex was expanded in the early 1870s and again between 1887 and 1906. From the 1930s, juvenile facilities, crisis centers, sick wards, and group homes were added.

In 1975, the main part of the hospital was closed and abandoned. In 1999, the large dome towering over the hospital's administration building collapsed. Then, on the night of March 19, 2006, a massive fire broke out in the center of the building, which included the administration and theater. Sections damaged by fire were then leveled, leaving only the decaying wings of the Kirkbride Building.

In May 2009, demolition of the remaining historic sections of the Kirkbride Building began. The facility had numerous architectural features that were salvaged and sold to individuals and companies throughout the United States, including architectural granite, bricks, timbers, iron gates, vintage plumbing and lighting fixtures, furniture, and slate roofing tiles. The project was completed in early 2010.

== Notable patients ==
- Anthony Santo, an Italian-American serial killer.
- Jane Toppan, a sociopathic serial killer.

== Recent history ==
In the early 1990s, a $19 million capital improvement plan was implemented by the state to improve the still-operating portions of the campus. In early 2012, the state announced the closure of the remaining parts of the facility containing 169 beds. A plan to keep a portion of the facility open was vetoed by Governor Deval Patrick in July 2012.

Taunton State Hospital remains open and houses 48 psychiatric beds, the Women's Recovery from Addiction Program, a residential program under the Department of Youth Services, and a substance abuse program administered by High Point Treatment Center. There is also a greenhouse on the campus that is staffed by patients and sells a variety of plants and seasonal produce to the public.

== See also ==
- National Register of Historic Places listings in Taunton, Massachusetts
