= Armand Basi =

Spanish businessperson and fashion designer (1924–2009)

Armand Basi (1924-January 9, 2009) was a Spanish businessman and fashion designer, co-founder of the fashion firm bearing his name.

In 1948, along with his brother Josep (d. November 2007), Basi founded a small knitting company inspired by their mother Mercé Sabi's knitted sweaters. By the end of the 1950s the business had expanded into a large textiles company, opening a factory on Balcells Street in Barcelona in 1958. In 1961–62, the Basis signed an exclusive contract with Lacoste to manufacture and distribute Lacoste products in Spain.

In 1986, Basi launched his eponymous fashion brand, which produced accessories, perfume, jewellery and watches, as well as clothing. A footwear line was launched in 2005. The Basis' cousin, Lluís Juste de Nin, who became creative director in 2000, worked as a designer for the firm. Alongside de Nin, other designers included Mirian Ocariz, and in 2009, Markus Lupfer was head of womenswear while Josef Abril designed menswear.

At the time of Basi's death from cancer in January 2009, there were branches in Antwerp, Moscow and London, and the business was in talks to enter the Chinese market.
