= Sancho =

- Pronunciation: UK: /ˈsæntʃoʊ/ US: /ˈsɑːntʃoʊ/ Spanish: [ˈsantʃo]
- Gender: Male
- Language: Spanish, Portuguese

Origin
- Origin: Latin: Sanctius
- Meaning: 'saint', 'holy'

Other names
- Variant forms: Santxo, Santzo, Santso, Antzo, Sans

Sancho is an Iberian given name. Sancho stems from the Latin name Sanctius. The feminine form of the name is Sanchia, and the common patronymic is Sánchez and Sanches.

Outside the Spanish-speaking world, the name is especially associated with the literary character Sancho Panza.

Sancho is a common slang term in the Spanish speaking world for the other man in the relationship, as in a spouse or girlfriend who is being unfaithful with a Sancho. Sancha is the feminine equivalent.

== Kings of Navarre ==
- Sancho I
- Sancho II
- Sancho III
- Sancho IV
- Sancho V (also king of Aragon)
- Sancho VI
- Sancho VII

== Kings of León and Castile ==
- Sancho I (León)
- Sancho II (León and Castile)
- Sancho III (Castile)
- Sancho IV (León and Castile)

== Kings of Portugal ==
- Sancho I, o Povoador
- Sancho II, o Capelo

== King of Majorca ==
- Sancho

== Dukes of Gascony ==
- Sancho I
- Sancho II
- Sancho III
- Sancho IV
- Sancho V
- Sancho VI

== Counts of Castile ==
- Sancho García

== Other historical figures ==
- Abd al-Rahman Sanchuelo
- Sancho (bishop of Jaca)
- Sancho, Count of Provence
- Sancho I of Astarac
- Sancho of Castile (bishop)
- Sancho of Castile, Count of Alburquerque
- Sancho Alfónsez
- Sanciolo d'Aragona
- Sancho of Aragon (archbishop of Toledo)
- Sancho of Aragon (died 1416)
- Sancho d'Avila
- Sancho Dávila y Fernández de Celis
- Sancho Dávila Toledo
- Sancho de Andrade de Figueroa
- Sancho de la Cerda, 1st Marquis of la Laguna
- Sancho de Larrosa
- Sancho de Londoño
- Sancho de Tovar
- Sancho de Tovar e Silva
- Sancho Fernández de Ovando
- Sancho Folch de Cardona, 1st Marquess of Guadalest
- Sancho Manoel de Vilhena
- Sancho Nunes de Barbosa
- Sancho Garcés, Lord of Uncastillo
- Sancho Gracia
- Sancho Jiménez
- Sancho Jimeno de Orozco
- Sancho Ochoa de Castro
- Sancho Ordóñez
- Sancho Ordóñez (count)
- Sancho Pardo Cárdenas y Figueroa
- Sancho Pardo Donlebún
- Sancho Ramirez
- Sancho Ramírez of Viguera
- Sancho Ramírez, Count of Ribagorza
- Sancho Sánchez
- Sancho Sanders
- Sancho Saunders
- Juan Bautista Sancho
- Manuela Sancho
- Charles Ignatius Sancho, 18th century British abolitionist, writer and composer
- 'Sancho', a nickname for philosopher Max Stirner in Marx and Engel's The German Ideology

== Fictional ==
- Sancho Panza

== Other ==
- Agustín Sancho, Spanish footballer
- Alejandro Sancho, American wrestler
- Antonio Sancho, Mexican footballer
- Antonio Andrés Sancho, Spanish cyclist
- Arturo García Sancho, Spanish actor
- Basilio Sancho, Spanish footballer and coach
- Brent Sancho, Trinidadian footballer and politician
- Carlos Sancho, Argentine politician
- Elena Sancho, Spanish politician
- Fernando Sancho, Spanish actor
- Jadon Sancho, English footballer of Trinidadian descent
- Jaime Sancho, Spanish sprinter
- José Maza Sancho, Chilean astronomer
- José Sancho, Spanish actor
- Nelia Sancho, Filipino feminist activist
- Ramon Solsona i Sancho, Catalan writer
- Ricardo Sancho, Spanish sport shooter
- Rodolfo Sancho, Spanish actor
- Tony Sancho, American actor
- Vidal Sancho, Spanish actor
- Xavier Bosch i Sancho, Catalan writer and journalist
- The War of the Three Sanchos, an 11th century conflict between the three first cousins Jímenez kings: Sancho II of Castile, Sancho IV of Navarre, and Sancho Ramírez of Aragon, all grandsons of Sancho the Great in Northern Spain.
