= Saint (disambiguation) =

Saint is the designation of a holy person.

Saint(s) may also refer to:

== Places ==
=== Saint ===
- Le Saint, Brittany, France

=== Saints ===
- Saints, Luton, Bedfordshire, England
- Saints, Seine-et-Marne, France
- Saints-en-Puisaye, formerly Saints, France
- The Saints, Suffolk, England

=== Saintes ===
- Saintes, Charente-Maritime, France
- Saintes, Belgium, a former commune in Belgium, part of Tubize
- Îles des Saintes, French Antilles
- Canton of Les Saintes, Guadeloupe

== Battles ==
- Battle of Saintes, a land battle between English and French forces in 1351
- Battle of the Saintes, a naval battle between British and French forces in 1782

== People ==
- Saints, inhabitants of the island of St. Helena
- Latter Day Saints
- Saint (surname)
- Saint (rapper), Gambian recording artist, songwriter and producer

== Sports teams ==
- Lady Saints, American women's volleyball team
- New Orleans Saints, American National Football League team
- New York Saints, lacrosse team
- Northampton Saints, English rugby union club
- St Mirren F.C., Scottish football club
- St Cuthbert Wanderers F.C., Scottish football club
- St. George Illawarra Dragons, Australian Rugby League Club
- St Helens R.F.C., English rugby league club
- St Johnstone F.C., Scottish football club
- St Kilda Football Club, Australian Rules Football club
- St Patrick's Athletic F.C., Irish football club
- St. Paul Saints, American minor league baseball team
- Siena Saints, the sports teams of Siena College
- Southampton F.C., English football team
- Winnipeg Saints, a defunct Canadian junior ice hockey team

== Fiction ==
- Saint (film), a 2010 Dutch dark comedy horror
- Saint (manhua), comics by Hong Kong manhua artist Khoo Fuk Lung
- Saint (novel), a 2006 novel by Ted Dekker
- Saint (Sugar Rush), a character in the British TV series Sugar Rush
- Saints (Boondock), three vigilantes in the film Boondock Saints
- Saints (novel), a 1984 novel by Orson Scott Card
- Saints, warriors fighting in the name of the goddess Athena in the manga and anime Saint Seiya by Masami Kurumada
- The 3rd Street Saints, a street gang in the Saints Row series of video games
- Saint, an alien race in the Mahoromatic manga and anime series
- One half of Boxers and Saints, graphic novels by Gene Luen Yang
- Martin Scorsese Presents: The Saints, 2024 docudrama series
- "Saints" (Yellowjackets), an episode of the American TV series Yellowjackets

== Music ==
- The Saints (Australian band), Australian punk band
- The Saints (Jamaican band)
- The Saints (British band), London instrumental rock band
- Saint (band), American Christian metal band
- Utah Saints, English band

=== Albums ===
- Saints (Destroy the Runner album)
- Saints (Marc Ribot album), 2001
- Saint, an album by James Reid

=== Songs ===
- "Saints" (song), by The Breeders from the album Last Splash
- "When the Saints Go Marching In", also known as "The Saints"
- "Saint", by Elton John from the album Too Low for Zero
- "Saint", by Travis Scott and Quavo from the album Huncho Jack, Jack Huncho
- "Saint", by Marilyn Manson from the album The Golden Age of Grotesque

== Other uses ==
- SAINT (institute), Sungkyunkwan Advanced Institute of Nanotechnology of South Korea
- SAINT (software), Security Administrator’s Integrated Network Tool
- Saint FM, a defunct radio station in Santa Helena
- Saint FM Community Radio, a radio station in Santa Helena
- Saints: The Story of the Church of Jesus Christ in the Latter Days, a four-volume history of the Church of Jesus Christ of Latter-day Saints
- Saints Peakhurst Coaches, a defunct bus company in Sydney, Australia
- Seigakuin Atlanta International School, a Japanese international private school known as SAINTS
- Springfield Armory SAINT, a series of semi-automatic firearms
- No. 16 Squadron RAF, nicknamed "The Saints"
- Project SAINT, SAtellite INTerceptor system in the early 1960s

== See also ==
- New Saints
- Portal:Saints
- The Saint (disambiguation)
