= Nicola Rosini Di Santi =

French sculptor and painter

Nicola Rosini di Santi
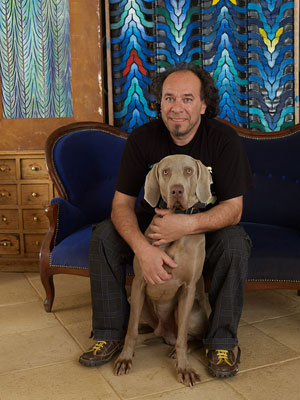
- Born: 1959 (age 66–67); Santeramo in Colle, Italy
- Known for: sculpture, drawing

Nicola Rosini Di Santi (born in 1959 in Santeramo in Colle, Italy) is a French sculptor and painter.

== Biography ==
At the age of ten, Di Santi discovered the workshop of the famous sculptor from Argentina Hugo Demarco, in Paris. Currently, he stays and works at Montauroux in Provence, near Cannes. Since 2009 he has created more than 100 paints based on recycled tires.

== Shows ==
- 1985: Paris – Gallery Sistu
- 1986: Paris – Gallery Varnier
- 1987: Paris – " Les fondeurs et leurs Sculpteurs " – Grand Palais, May 1987 show
- 1988: Paris – Gallery Carpentier – Figuration Critique – Rubens big from for sculpture
- 1989: Spain – Art festival of Las Palmas

Paris – autumn Paris show – Prix des sciences humanistes

- 1990–1991: Italy – Carrare Sculpture " L’âme de fond »

Paris – Goya big Prize

- 1992: Beaulieu-sur-Mer – Art festival

Aix-en-Provence – Seigneurs des Arts

- 1993: Paris – Gallery Carpentier

Mougins – Gallery Lézard

- 1995: Montauroux – Exposition collective

Roquebrune-sur-Argens – Water skiing world championship trophy
Saint-Tropez – Gallery Chantal Nobel – Niou Largue
Paris – Gallery Carpentier
Nice – Gallery Lézard – Callian- Chapelle des pénitents

- 1996: Saint-Tropez – Château de la Mésardiere

Paris – Gallery Carpentier

- 1997: Mougins – " L’art dans la rue »

Villepinte – Maison et Objets annual show

- 1998: Villepinte – Maison et Objets annual show

Monaco – L’art de la décoration
Auteuil – Maison 98

- 1999: Auteuil – L’art de la maison

Saint-Jean-Cap-Ferrat – Expo personnelle

- 2000: Monaco – Gallery Riccadonna

Saint-Tropez – Château de la Messardière
Donation to the Principality of Monaco of the sculpture " L’âme de fond ".

- 2001: Paris – Opera Gallery

New York City – Opera Gallery
Singapore – Opera Gallery
Saint-Tropez – Château de la Messardière

- 2002: Monaco – Gallery Riccadonna

Japan – Tokyo Bunkamura – Tokyo Gallery Museum – Tenjin Salaria event Fukuoka space – Loft Gallery Muséum Nogoya – Red brick wearhouse Gallery Yokohama

- 2003: Miami – Opera Gallery
- 2005: Singapore – Opera Gallery
- 2006: London – Opera Gallery
- 2006: Hong Kong – Opera Gallery
- 2007: Venice – Opera Gallery

Suisse – Espace Bétemps

- 2008: Singapore – Opera Gallery
- 2009: Paris – Opera Gallery
- 2010: Monaco – Opera Gallery
- 2011: Cannes – Hôtel Gray d'Albion
- 2011: Saint-Tropez – Château de la Messardière
- 2012: Cannes – Hôtel Gray d'Albion

Dubai – Opera Gallery

== Publications ==
- Nicola Rosini Di Santi, Opera Gallery edition, Paris, 2004, 130 pages, 90 photos
