= Maurice Kennedy (rugby league) =

Fijian rugby league footballer

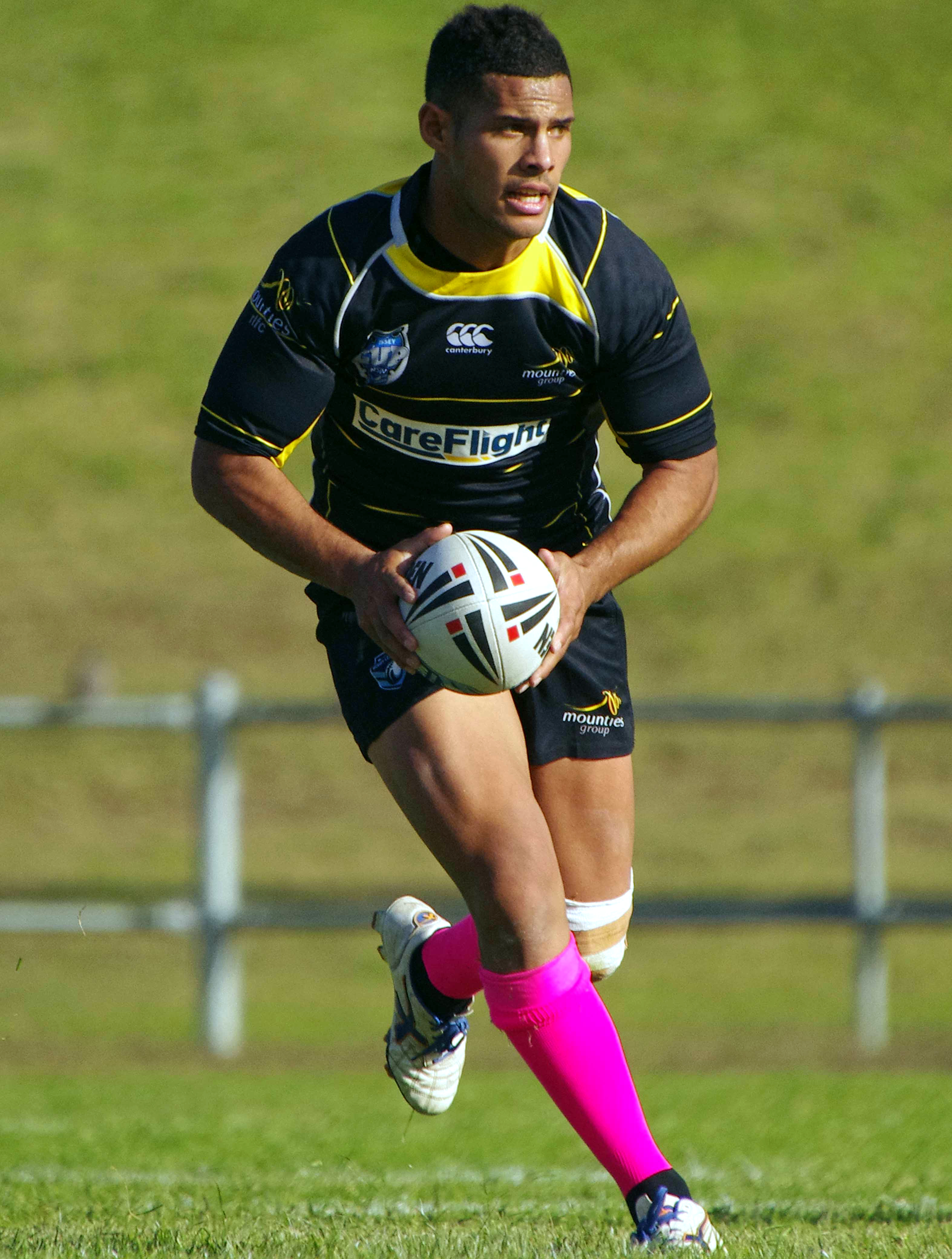

Personal information
- Full name: Maurice Kennedy
- Born: 16 October 1988 (age 38)
- Height: 5 ft 8 in (1.73 m)
- Weight: 12 st 8 lb (80 kg)

Playing information
- Position: Scrum-half, Stand-off
Representative
Years	Team	Pld	T	G	FG	P
2016–	Fiji	2	0	1	0	2
- Source: As of 28 July 2019

Maurice Kennedy (born 16 October 1988) is a Fijian professional rugby league footballer who plays as a scrum half or stand off for the Mount Pritchard Mounties in the NSW Cup and Fiji at international level.

Kennedy is a Fijian international. Kennedy's twin brother John Kennedy also plays for the Mounties and the pair have previously been in the system of the St. George Illawarra Dragons and have also played first grade rugby union.
