= Marco Santi =

Italian artist and art restorer (born 1963)

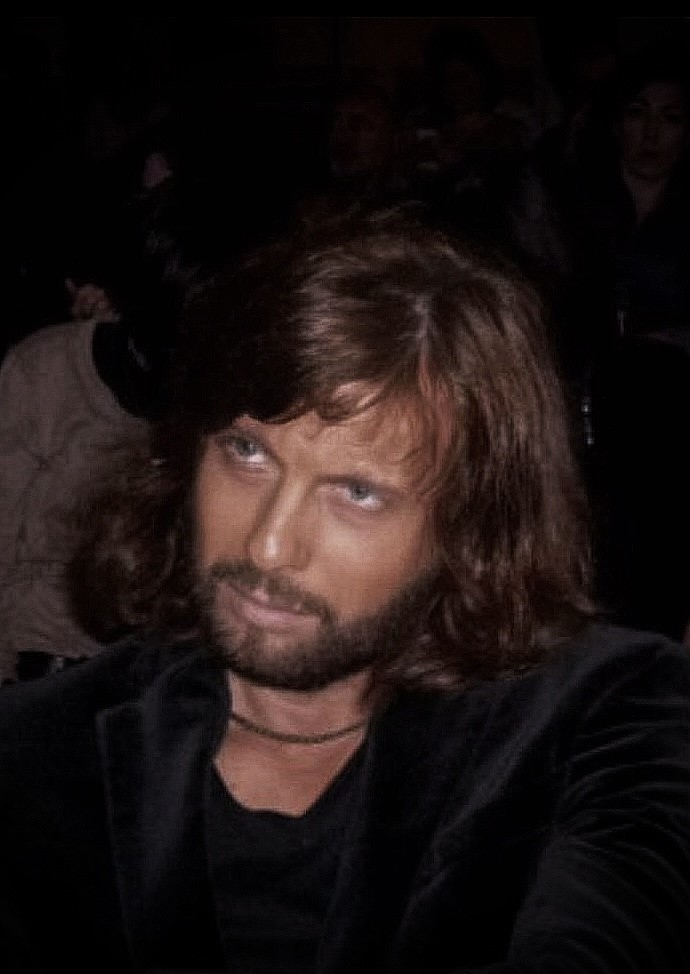
- Marco Santi in 2021
- Born: 1963 (age 62–63); Ravenna, Italy
- Education: Academy of Fine Arts in Ravenna
- Website: https://gruppomosaicisti.it

Marco Santi (born 1963) is an Italian artist, art restorer, businessman and mosaicist, director of the Gruppo Mosaicisti Ravenna since 2008.

== Life ==
Santi was born in Ravenna. He graduated from the Academy of Fine Arts in Ravenna and currently lives and works in Ravenna.

== Career ==
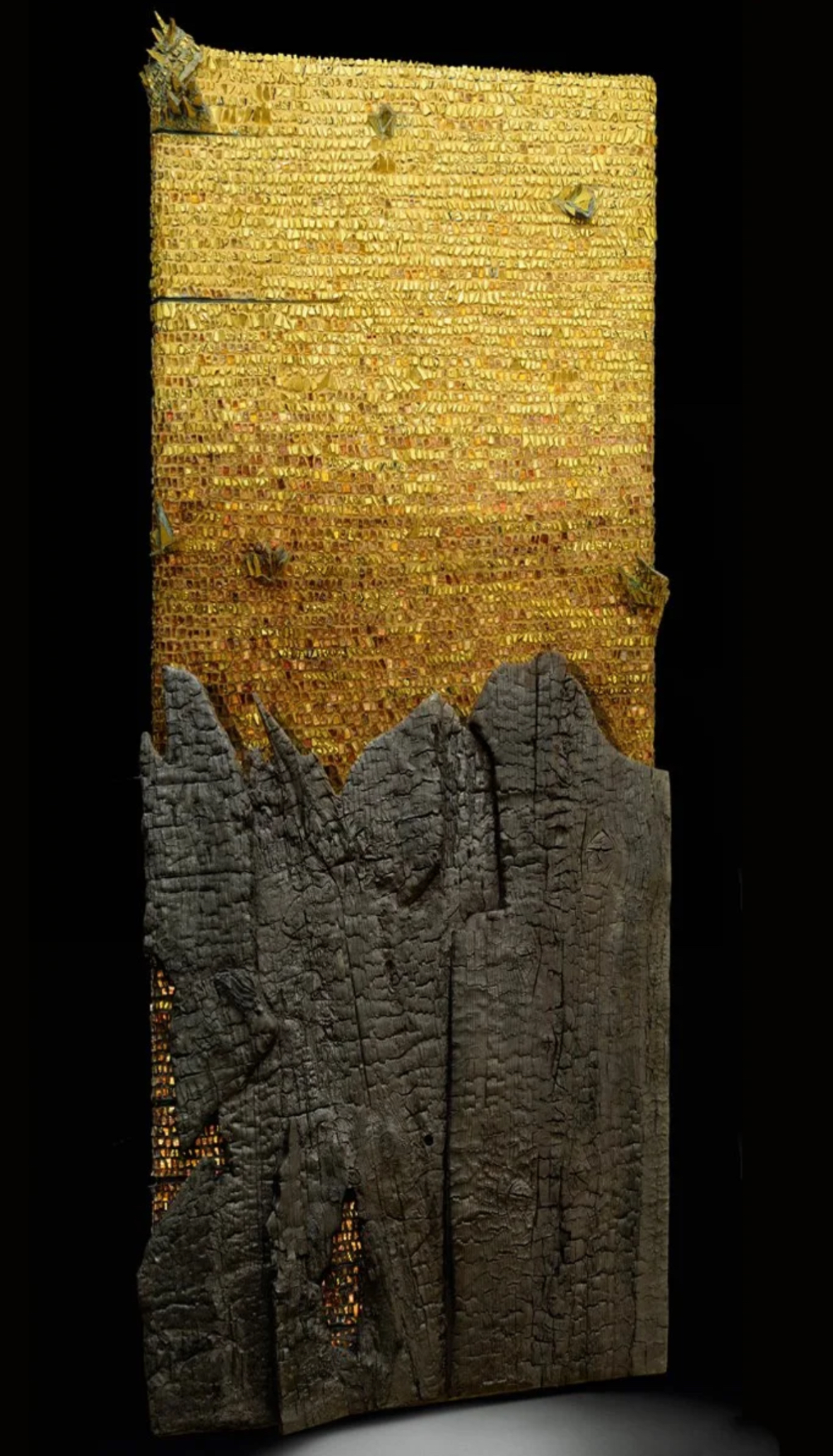
Marco Santi in 2017 - Carbo Spiritualis

He began his artistic career in 1979, working as a mosaicist and restorer at the Cooperativa Mosaicisti, a workshop of Ravenna mosaics of which he became president from 1989 to 2006. In 2008, he liquidated the Cooperativa Mosaicisti, reconstituting the "Gruppo Mosaicisti Ravenna," a company founded in 1948 with the aim of restoring Ravenna's cultural heritage damaged during World War II and creating contemporary mosaic works.

Since 2008, Santi and his group have conducted numerous works in Italy and abroad, including in the United States of America (including St. Patrick's Cathedral in New York) and several European and Middle Eastern countries.

He contributed to the birth of MUMO, the Open-Air Mosaic Museum of Tornareccio, in collaboration with Alfredo Paglione.

The artist's largest work, however, is in Beirut. In fact, for over ten years, the artist has been working with his company on the St. Anthony Greek Melkite Church, where the mosaic becomes three-dimensional and the subjects of the work emerge from the walls.

Marco Santi is the inventor of mosaics for the blind, thus giving the opportunity to perceive the three-dimensionality of the mosaic to all those people who have visual impairments.

With Santi's Mosaicists Group he has carried out numerous restoration interventions in Ravenna (including the Basilica of Sant'Apollinare in Classe) and in several Italian cities, also teaching the art of restoration at the Academy of Fine Arts in Ravenna, the University of Bologna and the Academy of Fine Arts in Macerata.

From a stylistic point of view, Marco Santi in his personal works does not place importance on the subjects, but shifts the attention to the materials he uses, making them become the subject itself with different meanings, often using coal or burnt wood wrapped in mosaic backgrounds.

== Works ==
- 2001 — Apse - St. Lucia's church (Reggio Calabria)
- 2006 — Fountains - Milano Marittima
- 2006 — MUMO (Open-air Mosaic Museum) - Tornareccio
- 2011 — Giovanni Paolo II - Sanctuary of Divine Love (Rome)
- 2011 — Siren - Roundabout Punta Marina Terme (Ravenna)
- 2015 — Honey pouring - homage to Tornareccio
- 2017 — Carbo Spiritualis
- 2017 — Mosaic Sculpture – The color of Sculpture (National Museum of Ravenna)
- 2017 — St. Charbel Makhluf - St. Patrick's Cathedral (New York)
- 2018 — Restitutions – Restored Art Treasures (Palace of Venaria)
- 2018 — sweet abandonment
- 2023 — Episodes of contemporary mosaic – Palazzo Rasponi Delle Teste Ravenna
- 2024 — Starry Flower - Rotonda Andorra Ravenna
- Mosaics - St. Anthony Greek Melkite Church (Lebanon)
- Pope Francis - Church of Purgatory in Ortona
- Mosaic restoration - Patriarchal Basilica (Aquileia)
- Domus mosaics (2nd century AD) - Turin Museum of Antiquities
- Sectile mosaic in the Minutolo Chapel - Naples Cathedral
- Grifo, opus sectile mosaic - Bitonto Cathedral (Bari)
- Contemporary mosaics – Art Museum of the City of Ravenna

== See also ==
- Mosaic
- Ravenna
