= Sancho Saunders =

American politician (born 1805)

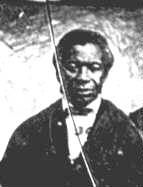

South Carolina House of Representatives
- In office 1868–1870

Personal details
- Born: 1805
- Died: Unknown

Sancho Saunders (born 1805) was a member of the South Carolina's House of Representatives during the Reconstruction era. He represented Chester County, South Carolina. He was documented as a literate Baptist minister who was a slave before the American Civil War. He was African American. His photograph was included in a montage of Radical Republican South Carolina legislators.
