= SNY (disambiguation) =

SNY is a TV network in New York City, United States.

SNY, or sny, may also refer to:

- SNY, the IATA code for Sidney Municipal Airport in the state of Nebraska, US
- sny, the ISO 639-3 code for the Sanio language spoken in Papua New Guinea
- SNY, the Nasdaq ticker symbol for Sanofi, multinational pharmaceutical company based in Paris, France
- SNY, the National Rail code for Sunnymeads railway station in the county of Berkshire, UK
- Senayan MRT station, a rapid transit station in Jakarta, Indonesia
