= Anna Dreimane =

Latvian basketball player

No. 14 – , Texas A&M University
- Position: Center
- League: MW

Personal information
- Born: April 4, 1997 (age 29) Riga, Latvia
- Listed height: 6 ft 6 in (1.98 m)

Anna Dreimane (born July 4, 1997) is a Latvian basketball player for Colorado State Rams and the Latvian national team.

She participated at the EuroBasket Women 2017.
