= Santino Sposito =

Argentine beach handball player

Personal information
- Full name: Santino Sposito
- Born: 22 June 2002 (age 24) Viedma, Argentina
- Height: 1.93 m (6 ft 4 in)

Sport
- Sport: Handball
- Position: Right back
- Current club: Handebol Clube Taubaté

Senior clubs
- Years: Team
- –: Club Sol de Mayo
- –: San Fernando Handball
- 2026-: Handebol Clube Taubaté
National team
- Years: Team
- 2022-: Argentina

Santino Sposito (born 22 June 2002) is an Argentine beach handball player for Handebol Clube Taubaté and the Argentina national team.

He participated at the 2026 Men's Beach Handball World Championships and the 2023 South American Beach Games.

== Club career ==
Born in Viedma, Río Negro, he began his career with notable performances at Club Sol de Mayo. He subsequently signed with Buenos Aires-based club San Fernando before making his international breakthrough by joining the Brazilian team Taubaté.

== International career ==
Sposito is a member of the Argentina men's national beach handball team, nicknamed Los Kamikazes, representing the country in several major tournaments. He competed at the 2023 South American Beach Games and was part of the squad that won the bronze medal at the 2026 Men's Beach Handball World Championships.
