= Jenny Santi =

Filipina philanthropy advisor (born 1980)

Jennifer Rose “Jenny” Santi (born 1980) is a Filipino-born author and philanthropy advisor, former Head of Philanthropy Services for UBS in Southeast Asia, and currently the founder of the philanthropic advisory firm Saint & Partners and author of the book “The Giving Way to Happiness: Stories & Science Behind the Life-Changing Power of Giving.”

== Early life and education ==
Santi was born in Manila, Philippines the second of three children, and attended the Catholic school Colegio San Agustin, She graduated summa cum laude from the Ateneo de Manila University, where she almost became valedictorian, but told the administration to instead choose Roselle Ambubuyog, who became the university’s first visually-impaired valedictorian. Santi later taught for a year at the age of 22 and then moved to London to work as a management consultant. She earned her MBA from INSEAD in 2007, attended the Wharton School of Business under the Wharton-INSEAD Alliance.

== Philanthropy advisory work ==
After completing MBA, Santi became the Head of Philanthropy Services for UBS in Southeast Asia, where she advised ultra high net worth individuals and families on their giving. She conceptualized and led the UBS-INSEAD Study of Family Philanthropy in Asia, the largest study of Asian family philanthropy to date. She started her consulting firm Saint & Partners in 2013, when she got a call from the (Goldie) Hawn Foundation, asking her to be their consultant while she was on a break working on her book.

== The Giving Way to Happiness Book ==
Santi said she became “obsessed” with the idea and pursued it even though she did not know anyone in publishing and had never written a book, because it had the potential to inspire other people." In an interview she said that tales of giving go unheard and that a lot of people still resist the notion that by giving, we receive. The book was eventually published by Tarcher Penguin Random House.

== Bibliography ==
Santi, Jenny (2015). The Giving Way to Happiness: Stories & Science Behind the Life-Changing Power of Giving. TarcherPerigee. ISBN 9780399175497.

The UBS-INSEAD Study of Family Philanthropy in Asia
