= Giuseppe Santini =

Italian Abbot and mathematician

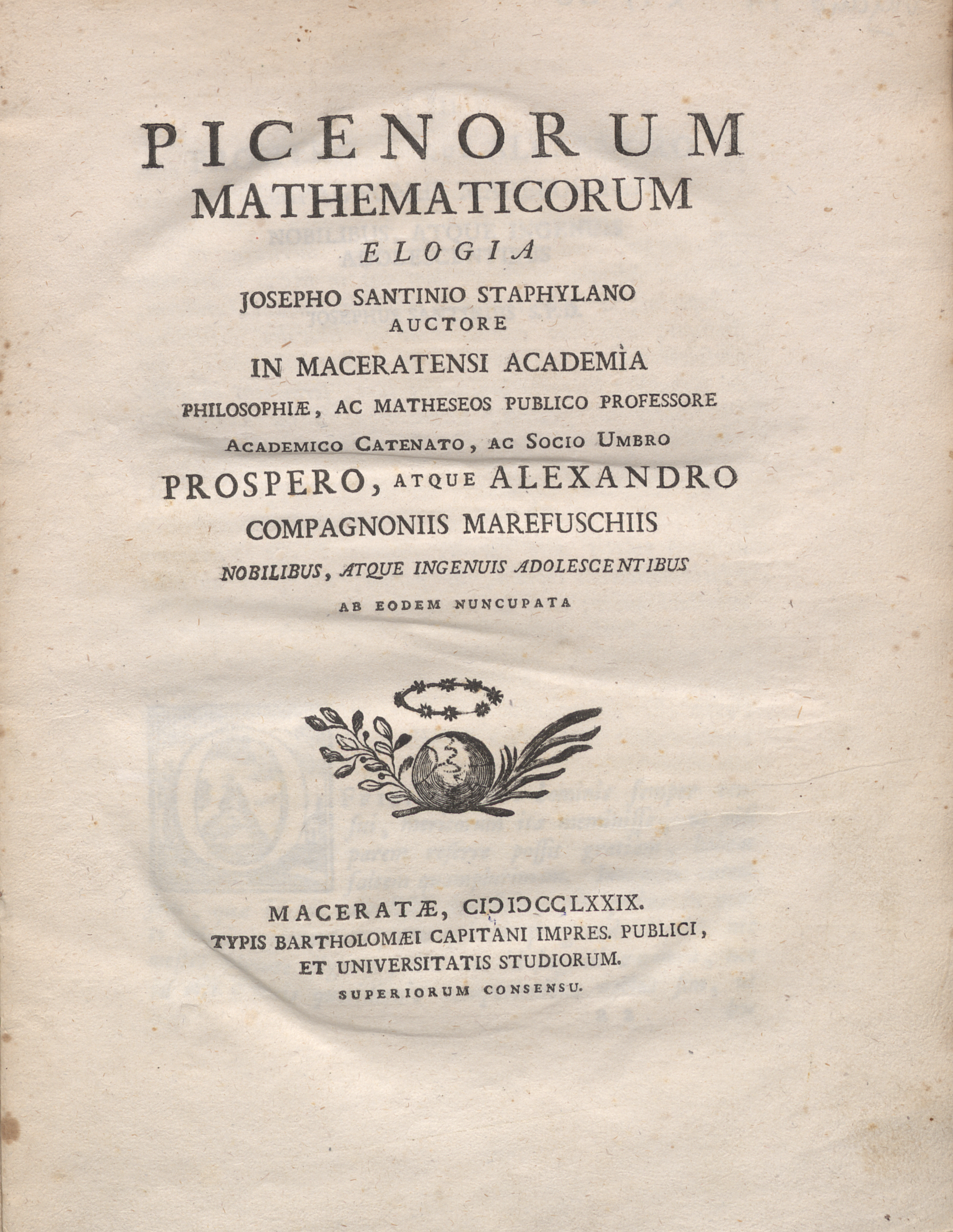
Picenorum mathematicorum elogia, 1779

Giuseppe Santini (1735–1796) was an Italian abbot and a mathematician.

Santini was born in Staffolo. He taught philosophy and mathematics at Collegio di Osimo. The Picenorum mathematicorum elogia is his most known work and provides useful information about the academic field status at the time.

== Works ==
- Santini, Giuseppe (1779). Picenorum mathematicorum elogia. Maceratae: Bartolomeo Capitani.
