= Giuseppe Santi =

Italian painter

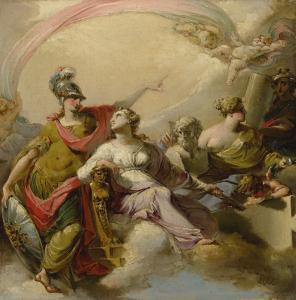

Giuseppe Santi (1729 – 1825) was an Italian painter who was a professor of design at the Academy of Fine Arts of Ferrara.

He was born in Bologna and trained under Ubaldo Gandolfi. He moved to Ferrara in 1797 and painted for various churches and homes in Ferrara. Among his pupils were the engraver Ignazio Dolcetti, Giovanni Antonio Baruffaldi, and Gaetano Domenichini.

== Sources ==
- Laderchi, Camillo. La pittura ferrarese: memorie, Ferrara: Abram Servadio Editore, 1856, p. 184.
