= Sonni Castle =

Castle in Yazd Province, Iran

Sonni castle
- قلعه سنی

General information
- Type: Castle
- Location: Abarkuh County, Iran

Sonni castle (Persian: قلعه سنی) is a historical castle located in Abarkuh County in Yazd Province, The longevity of this fortress dates back to the Qajar dynasty.
