= Anthony Santo =

Italian-American serial killer

- Born: 1894; Italy
- Died: Unknown; Taunton Lunatic Asylum, Taunton, Massachusetts, United States
- Conviction: Never charged
- Penalty: Found incompetent to stand trial; sent to mental asylum

Details
- Victims: Confessed to 3
- Span of crimes: March – May 1908
- Country: United States
- States: New York, Massachusetts

Anthony Santo (born c. 1894 in Italy – date of death unknown) was an Italian-American man who confessed to murdering two of his cousins and another girl in the span of three months during "mad spells". He was eventually diagnosed as having hallucinations and sent to Taunton Lunatic Asylum, where he supposedly died.

== Biography ==
Not much is known about Santo's life prior to his immigration to America, but it is known that he was born c. 1894 in Italy. Sometime prior to the murders, he had begun showing signs of mental illness. His parents claimed that he contracted scarlet fever when he was around six years old and that "his mind [had] been afflicted" since that time.

On June 6, 1908, Anthony Santo (age 14) was apprehended and questioned regarding the theft of a bicycle. He confessed to murdering his two cousins, Frank and James Marino (ages 18 and 12 respectively) in Brooklyn as well as six-year-old Louise Staula in Dedham.

=== Murder of James and Frank Marino ===
According to Santo's confession, he led his two cousins on a long walk in the woods in Brooklyn near 6th Street. When the boys weren't looking, he threw large rocks at their heads. James was killed by the rocks, but Santo used a pocket knife to kill Frank after injuring him with the rocks. Santo claimed that he buried Frank's body in the woods, but could not remember what had become of James' body. He also could not recall an exact date, only that it was around March 1, 1908.

=== Murder of Louise Staula ===
About a month before Louise Staula's death, Santo moved to East Boston where he lived with another cousin. He then began work as a water boy, helping with the construction of a sewer.

In May 1908, the body of six-year-old Louise F. Staula was found in the Charles River meadow which was behind her house. Ten fist-sized rocks were found near the body, five had bloodstains. Police theorized that she had been stoned to death based on her injuries.

On June 6, Santo was apprehended for bicycle theft and confessed to the murder as well as that of his two cousins. Santo claimed that on May 11, while in Dedham, he chanced upon 6-year-old Louise Staula. In that moment he claimed to experience a "mad spell" and struck the girl once before picking up a rock and throwing it at her while she tried to escape. Louise was struck on the head and fell on the ground. Thinking she was dead, Santo began praying for her so he could "make her get better". Staula hadn't died yet, but without any help she eventually died from her injuries. Anthony stayed with Staula's body for a while before deciding to leave her body in the open field and flee.

=== Arrest, confession and imprisonment ===
Santo was captured in Norwood, after he was caught trying to steal a bike. After an examination and trial, Police Chief Fred S. Sackett and a few reporters were interviewing the boy when he announced that he had something important to tell them. He then confessed to the murders of his two cousins. The policemen immediately detained the alleged murderer until an investigation could be conducted. While being interrogated regarding his earlier confession, Santo also told the investigators that he had murdered Staula.

Police records in Brooklyn did not support Santo's confession. No boys by the last name Marino had been reported missing around the time Santo claimed to have committed the murders. Santo indicated that his cousins lived at 461 Carroll Street, but other tenants could not confirm that anyone by the name Marino lived in the building in at least the last year.

Despite his confession, the officers and doctors questioning him also determined that he was not connected with Staula's death. They claimed that he was "feeble-minded" and delusional, experiencing hallucinations. Shortly after, an order for his removal was issued by the authorities of Dedham, and Santo was submitted to the Taunton Lunatic Asylum. It is assumed that he died there, but the date of death remains unknown.

== See also ==
- List of serial killers in the United States

== Bibliography ==
- Michael Newton: The Encyclopedia of Serial Killers, 2000
