= Seven Santini Brothers =

Seven Santini Brothers, Inc.
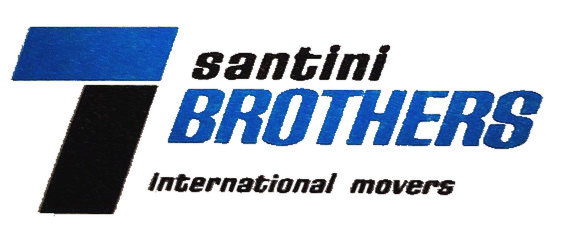
- Company type: Family-owned
- Industry: Moving and storage
- Founded: 1905
- Defunct: 1993
- Fate: Dissolved
- Headquarters: Bronx, New York, U.S.
- Key people: Pasquale Santini, founder; Goffredo E. Santini, Godfrey F. Santini, presidents

Seven Santini Brothers (also Santini Brothers, Inc.) was a full-service American moving, storage, and relocation company that was founded by seven Italian immigrants. The seven brothers were Pasquale, Pietro, Paride, Rinaldo, Agostino, Goffredo, and Martino, five of whom started the business in 1905, with the last two others joining in 1907. The firm dissolved in 1993.

== History ==
Pasquale Santini, the eldest of the seven sons of a farmer living in the Tuscan Hills of Italy, decided to join the tide of immigration to America, the land of opportunity. In 1896 he went to America where he got a job with a cousin who was in the moving business. After saving enough money to send for his brother Pietro, and with the two of them working, they were able to send for three more of their brothers. In April 1905, the five brothers decided to start a moving business of their own in the Bronx, New York. By 1907 they amassed sufficient money to send for the two remaining younger brothers. Their inherent honesty, promptness, courtesy, and care in handling of all materials soon earned them a fine reputation which, originally by word of mouth, spread throughout the entire area.

From 1913, the company was located in a building at 607-609 Jackson Avenue. In the mid-1920s Santini acquired the ten-story building at 1405-1417 Jerome Avenue on the corner of 170th Street. This became their main office, while their Jackson Avenue facility became a branch office. An ad for the Seven Santini Bros. from 1935 gives their address as 1405 Jerome Avenue.

In 1935, Pasquale Santini died at the age of 61. His obituary notice in the New York Herald Tribune credited him with founding Santini Brothers. In 1954, Paride Santini, age 75, died. His obituary in The New York Times read:

Paride L. Santini, a member of the firm of Santini Bros., Inc., moving contractors and warehouse owners at 1405 Jerome Avenue, the Bronx, died Thursday in Mount Sinai Hospital after a long illness. His age was 75. Mr. Santini was one of seven brothers who came from the town of Fondagno in Tuscany, Italy. They started the moving and storage warehouse business in 1905 at Westchester and Jackson Avenues, the Bronx. Their initial equipment was a horse and wagon. The business has progressed since that time into one of the best-known companies in this field. Five of the brothers survive. They are Peter, August, Martin, Godfrey and Rinaldo Santini.

Goffredo (Godfrey E.) Santini remained as president and chairman of the board until he died in 1956. Leadership of the firm was then turned over to Martin, who retired in 1964, and then Goffredo's son Godfrey F. Santini. Rinaldo was the last to die in 1980.

Goffredo attributed the success of the Santini organization to "a genuine desire to do a good job, and sincere interest in the customer's problem in a spirit of helpfulness... while we are in business for gain, we always consider profit as secondary importance to a job well done. A satisfied customer will pay dividends in the long run."

Ultimately the Seven Santini Brothers grew into one of the world's largest moving, packing and shipping organizations, with offices and warehousing facilities from coast to coast and in six foreign countries. Their notable clients included the Smithsonian, the Museum of Modern Art, Joseph Hirshhorn, the Estate of American painter Morris Louis, and the Chrysler Museum of Art, and one of their renowned employees was James Lebron, a master art handler and installer.

In 1974, Santini opened industrial packing facilities in Houston and Galveston to service their oil and energy industry clients. In 1981, part of a Bronx park was renamed to Seven Brothers Square, honoring the company.

As economic conditions changed, the Santini family eventually sold the company to another moving and storage company in 1988, whereupon the new owners decided to dismantle and sell the various operations of the company. By 1993, the company was completely dissolved.
