= Sonny's BBQ =

American barbecue restaurant chain

Coordinates: 28.6315°N 81.3753°W

- Type: Private
- Genre: Restaurants
- Founded: April 17, 1968; 58 years ago
- Founder: Floyd 'Sonny' Tillman
- Headquarters: Maitland, Florida, United States
- Number of locations: 113
- Area served: Florida, Georgia, Kentucky, Louisiana, Mississippi, Alabama, North Carolina, South Carolina, and Tennessee
- Key people: Sonny Tillman, Jamie Yarmuth
- Owner: Bob Yarmuth
- Website: www.sonnysbbq.com

Sonny's BBQ is a barbecue restaurant chain founded by Floyd "Sonny" Tillman in Gainesville, Florida, in 1968. Bob Yarmuth purchased the company in 1991 and continues as the company's owner and CEO today. As of 2026, Sonny's BBQ has 90 restaurants across eight Southeastern states and is headquartered in Winter Park,FL. The restaurant specializes in Southern-style BBQ.

== History ==
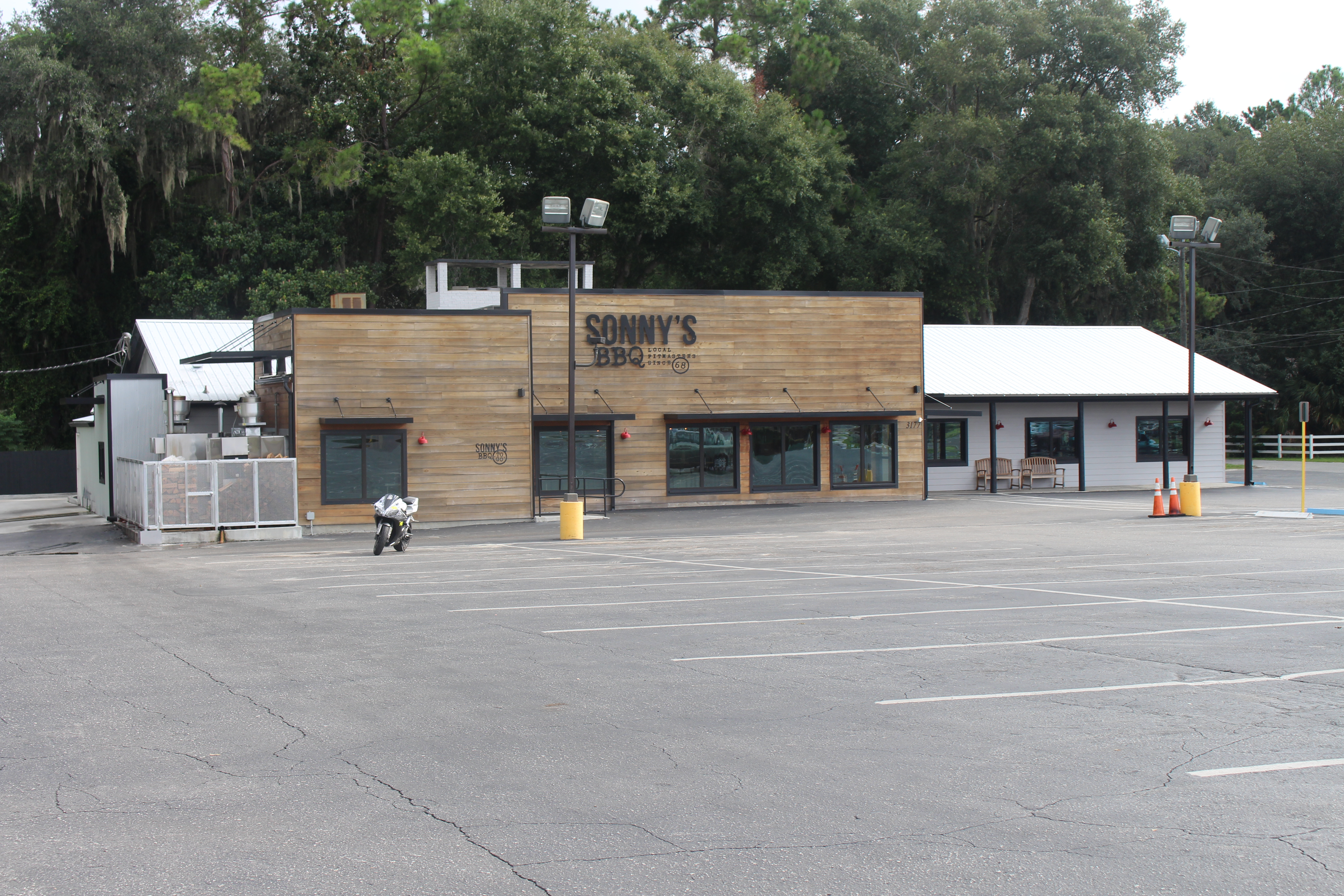
A Sonny's BBQ in Lake City, Florida

Sonny's Real Pit-Bar-B-Q was founded on April 17, 1968, by Floyd "Sonny" Tillman and his wife Lucille, starting with a single location on Waldo Road in Gainesville, Florida. The company began franchising nine years later in 1977 with a menu consisting of pork, beef, ribs, chicken, beans and other sides. In 1988, Sonny's BBQ had grown to 77 restaurants across six states, and Tillman sold the company to outside investors. In 1991, Bob Yarmuth purchased the company.

During the 2000s, Sonny's was the largest BBQ restaurant chain in the United States, with about 150 locations across nine states. In 2011, the company had 125 operating franchised restaurants. In 2012, the company moved its headquarters to Winter Park, Florida and in 2013, the company changed its name from Sonny's Real Pit-Bar-B-Q to Sonny's BBQ.

Company founder Floyd "Sonny" Tillman passed away on December 7, 2025 at the age of 96. He was preceded in death by his wife Lucille and their son William.

=== 2008 Recession ===
On September 25, 2008, Greater Atlanta Bar-B-Q (the only Metro Atlanta franchisee of Sonny's) filed for Chapter 11 bankruptcy protection for ten locations, four of which were closed completely, raising concerns about another restaurant's viability after Metromedia Restaurant Group closed its Bennigan's and Steak & Ale restaurant chains. Yet, as of the first week of June 2009, it came out of bankruptcy, completing Chapter 11 requirements. On October 15, 2008, all three Sonny's locations in the greater Daytona Beach area of Florida were closed. As of December 1, 2009, the Tifton, Georgia restaurant became known as the Smokehouse Restaurant due to disputes with Sonny's over imagery and icons in the restaurant itself and on employees' clothing.

Sonny Tillman's birthday is celebrated as a special event by the restaurant each August 14. Despite selling the franchise, Tillman retained ownership of the original Sonny's BBQ until 2011, when he relinquished his franchisee agreement. Afterwards he continued to attend grand openings, sometimes appearing in commercials, and participating in other events. Events held by Sonny's include its Random Acts of BBQ events, where individual restaurants provide a BBQ feast for community volunteers and volunteer organizations. The company named October 12 as National Pulled Pork Day beginning in 2016, which is celebrated at all Sonny's locations.

== Menu ==
Sonny's BBQ menu has Southern-style barbecue, including pulled pork, sliced pork, baby back ribs, buffalo wings, St. Louis-style ribs, beef brisket, burgers, appetizers, and sides.

== See also ==
- List of barbecue restaurants
