= Mike Van Sant =

American drag racer

Mike Van Sant, nicknamed "Mighty Mike", is an American drag racer.

In 1971, Van Sant drove the popular Stone, Woods, and Cook Top Fuel Pinto funny car Tinkerbell. He followed that with a ride in the SW&C TF/FC Mustang Swinndler III.

More recently, he drove the TF/FC Mustang Invader.
