= Santa Dreimane =

Latvian basketball player (born 1985)

Santa Dreimane (born 27 July 1985, in Cēsis) is a Latvian basketball player.
