= Sancha =

Sancha is a given name, a variant form of Sanchia.

People named Sancha include:

- Sancha, Lady of Alenquer (1180–1279), feudal Lady of Alenquer
- Sancha of Aragon, Princess of Squillace (1478–1506), Aragonese aristocrat
- Sancha of Aragon (died 1097), Aragonese princess and countess of Urgell
- Sancha of Aragon, Countess of Toulouse (1186–1241), Countess consort of Toulouse
- Sancha of Castile, Queen of Aragon (1154–1208), queen of Aragon
- Sancha of Castile, Queen of Navarre (1139–1179), queen of Navarre
- Sancha of León (1018–1067), princess and queen of León
- Sancha, heiress of León (1191–before 1243), briefly suo jure Queen of León, reigning alongside her younger sister, Dulce
- Sancha of Portugal (born 1264) (1264–c. 1284), Portuguese infanta
- Sancha Garcia, abbess of the royal monastery Abbey of Santa María la Real de Las Huelgas from 1207 to 1229/30
- Sancha Ponce de Cabrera (died 1176), Leonese aristocrat
- Sancha Raimúndez (1095/1102–1159), Leonese infanta
