= Santino Vera =

Argentine footballer (born 2006)

Personal information
- Date of birth: 11 April 2006 (age 20)
- Place of birth: Quilmes, Buenos Aires, Argentina
- Height: 1.69 m (5 ft 7 in)
- Position: Midfielder

Team information
- Current team: Unión Santa Fe
- Number: 29

Youth career
- Racing

Senior career*
Years	Team	Apps	(Gls)
2023–2026	Racing	5	(0)
2026–	Unión Santa Fe	1	(0)
- * Club domestic league appearances and goals as of 17:10, 29 July 2026 (UTC)

Santino Vera (born 11 April 2006) is an Argentine professional footballer who plays as a midfielder for Unión Santa Fe.

== Club career ==
Born in Quilmes in the Buenos Aires Province of Argentina, Vera began his career with Racing, training at the club's Predio Tita Mattiussi training ground. Having progressed through the academy, he was called up to the senior squad by manager Fernando Gago for the first time in May 2023, ahead of the Copa Libertadores match against Ecuadorian opposition Aucas. He travelled with the squad to Quito, but did not feature in the match.

He made his professional debut two months later, coming on as a second-half substitute for Nicolás Oroz in a 4–0 win against Colón on 2 July 2023. Later in the same month, he signed his first professional contract, alongside teammates Agustín Ojeda and Axel Cabellos.

== Career statistics ==
=== Club ===
As of 27 August 2023.

Appearances and goals by club, season and competition
Club	Season	League			National Cup		League Cup		Continental		Other		Total	
Club	Season	Division	Apps	Goals	Apps	Goals	Apps	Goals	Apps	Goals	Apps	Goals	Apps	Goals
Racing	2023	Argentine Primera División	3	0	0	0	2 (Note: Appearances in the Copa de la Liga Profesional)	0	0	0	0	0	5	0
Career total			3	0	0	0	2	0	0	0	0	0	5	0
