= Sante =

Sante is both a masculine Italian given name and a surname. Notable people with the name include:

Given name:

- Sante Bentivoglio (1426–1462), Italian nobleman
- Sante Geronimo Caserio (1873–1894), Italian anarchist and assassin
- Sante Cattaneo (1739–1819), Italian Neoclassic painter
- Sante Ceccherini (1863–1932), Italian fencer
- Sante Gaiardoni (born 1939), Italian cyclist
- Sante Geminiani (1919–1951), Italian motorcycle racer
- Sante Graziani (1920–2005), American artist
- Sante Kimes (1934–2014), American murderer
- Sante Lombardo (1504–1560), Italian architect
- Sante Marsili (1950–2024), Italian water polo player
- Sante Monachesi (1910–1991), Italian painter
- Sante Poromaa (born 1958), Swedish Zen Buddhist priest
- Sante De Sanctis (1862–1935), Italian psychologist
- Sante Vandi (1653–1716), Italian Baroque painter

Surname:

- Lucy Sante (born 1954), Belgian-American writer and critic

== See also ==
- "Santé" (song), a 2021 song by Belgian singer Stromae
- Sante River, river in Michigan, United States
