= Saint (surname) =

Saint is a surname. Notable people with the name include:

- Andrew Saint (1946–2025), British architectural historian
- Crosbie E. Saint (1936–2018), American general
- Eva Marie Saint (1924–2026), American actress
- Harry F. Saint (born 1941), American author
- Howard Saint (1893–1976), British pilot
- Jennifer Saint, British novelist
- Johnny Saint (born 1941), English wrestler
- Lawrence Saint (1885–1961), American stained glass artist
- Nate Saint (1923–1956), American missionary pilot killed in Ecuador, brother of Rachel
- Rachel Saint (1914–1994), American missionary in Ecuador
- Silvia Saint (born 1976), Czech porn actress
- Steve Saint (born 1951), Ecuadorian/American businessman and author, son of Nate

== See also ==
- Saint (disambiguation)
