= Tony Satini =

Tonga international rugby league footballer

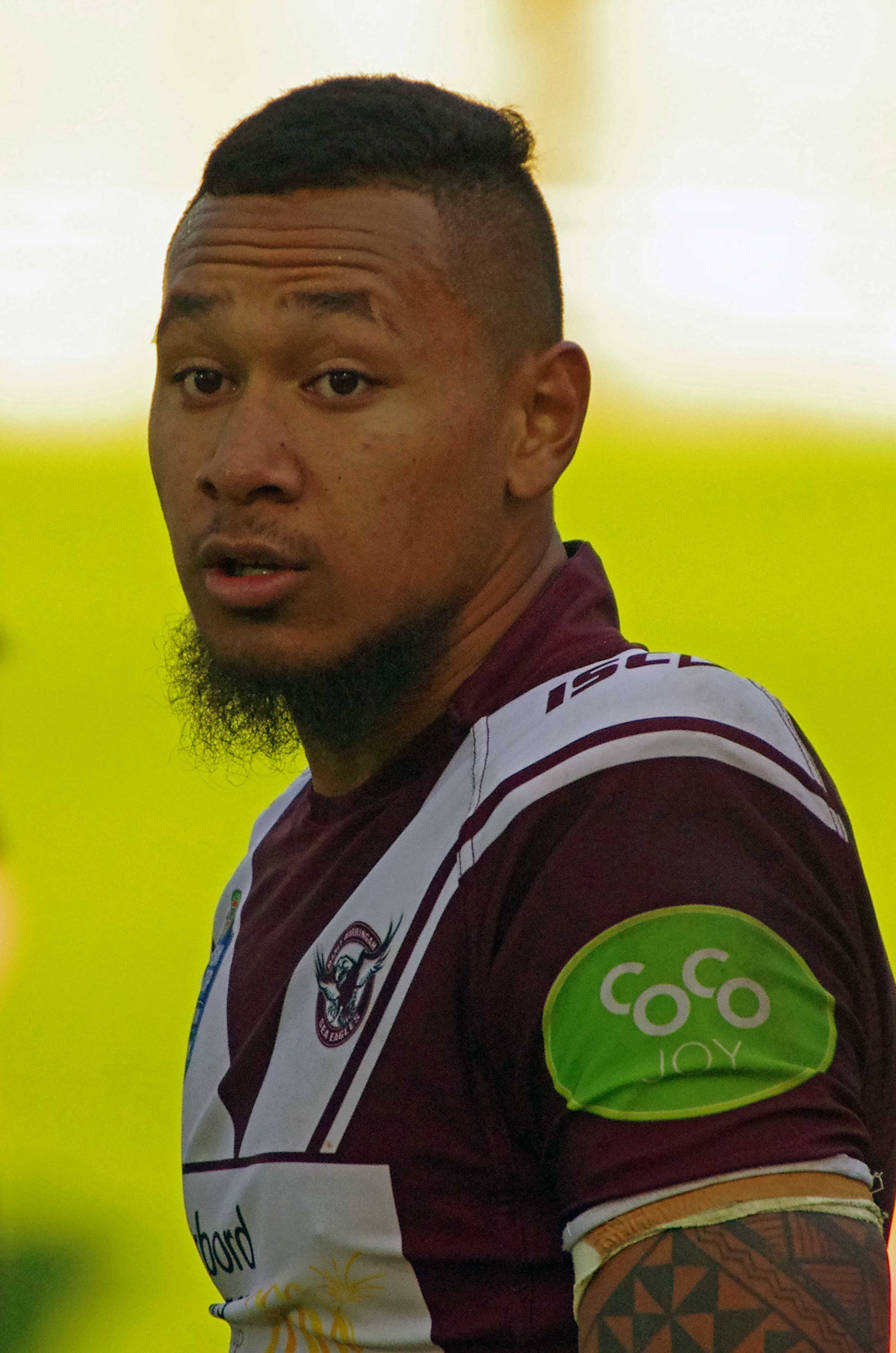

Personal information
- Full name: Wellentony Taufa Satini
- Born: 29 August 1993 (age 33) Blacktown, New South Wales, Australia
- Height: 189 cm (6 ft 2 in)
- Weight: 105 kg (16 st 7 lb)

Playing information
- Position: Centre
Club
Years	Team	Pld	T	G	FG	P
2014	Manly Sea Eagles	1	0	0	0	0
Representative
Years	Team	Pld	T	G	FG	P
2014	Tonga	1	0	0	0	0
2018	NSW Residents	1	1	0	0	4
- Source: As of 10 January 2024

Tony Satini (born 29 August 1993) is a professional rugby league footballer who played as a centre for the North Sydney Bears in the NSW Cup in 2021. He previously played for the Manly Warringah Sea Eagles and the Mount Pritchard Mounties. He played for the Tonga national rugby league team in 2014.

== Background ==
Satini was born in Blacktown, New South Wales, Australia. He is of Tongan descent.

He played junior rugby union for the Blacktown Scorpions and junior rugby league for the Glenmore Park Brumbies. He was then signed by the Penrith Panthers.

== Playing career ==
=== Early career ===
From 2011 to 2013, Satini played for the Penrith Panthers' NYC team, captaining the side in 2013. In October 2013, he signed a contract with the Manly Warringah Sea Eagles starting in 2014.

=== 2014 ===
In Round 3 of the 2014 NRL season, Satini made his NRL debut for the Sea Eagles against the Parramatta Eels. On 19 October, he played for Tonga against Papua New Guinea.

=== 2015 ===
In August, Satini re-signed with the Sea Eagles on a 1-year contract until the end of 2016.

=== 2016 ===
After failing to make a first-grade appearance in the 2015 and 2016 seasons, Satini was released at the end of the year. Late in the year, he rejoined his old club Penrith for the 2017 season.

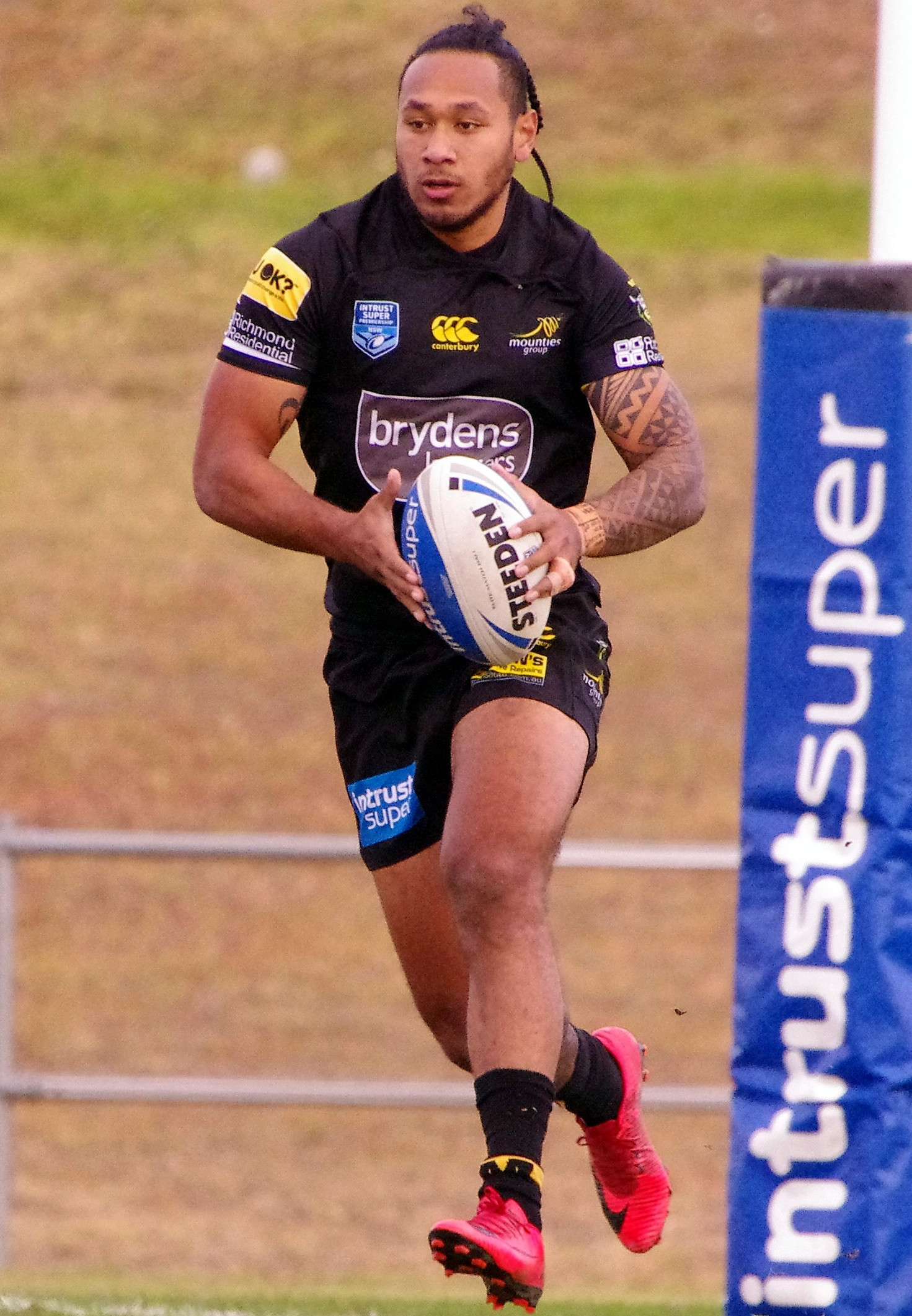
Santini playing for the Mounties in 2018

=== 2017 ===
Satini scored a try in Penrith's 20-12 victory over Wyong in The 2017 Intrust Super Premiership NSW grand final. The following week Satini scored four tries for Penrith in their 42-18 win over The PNG Hunters in The 2017 NRL State Championship final.

=== 2018 ===
In 2018, Satini was selected to play for the NSW residents against the QLD residents side.

=== 2019 ===
On 6 May, Satini was selected for the Canterbury Cup NSW residents side to play against the Queensland residents representative team.

Satini played for Mounties in their elimination final loss against Newtown at Campbelltown Stadium.

=== 2020 ===
Santini played for Mounties in 2020.

=== 2021 ===
After being released by Mounties, Santini signed a contract to play for North Sydney in the NSW Cup. He made his debut in round 1 of the competition, a 48-20 loss against Blacktown Workers.
