= Sancho Sanders =

American politician

Sancho Sanders was a church leader, delegate to the 1868 South Carolina Constitutional Convention, and a member of the South Carolina House of Representatives in 1870 during the Reconstruction era. He represented Chester County, South Carolina.

As a church leader at Pilgrim Church, he was ousted after division among his congregation.
