= Santo (given name) =

Santo is a masculine given name which may refer to:

== People ==
- Santo Biasatti (born 1943), Argentine journalist
- Santo Cilauro (born 1961), Australian comedian, actor, and television producer
- Santo Condorelli (born 1995), American swimmer
- Santo Farina (born 1937), American rock and roll musician
- Santo Jeger (1898–1953), British politician
- Santo Loquasto (born 1944), American production, set, and costume designer
- Santo Mazzarino (1916–1987), Italian historian
- Santo Santoro (born 1956), Australian politician
- Santo Stephens (born 1969), American football player
- Santo Trafficante Jr. (1914–1987), American Mafia boss, head of the Trafficante crime family
- Santo Trafficante Sr. (1886–1954), Sicilian-born mobster, father of Santo Trafficante Jr.
- Santo Versace (born 1944), Italian businessman and politician

== Fictional characters ==
- Santo DiMera, a character in Days of Our Lives
- Rockslide (Santo Vaccarro), Marvel Comics character
