= Lapa oil field =

Brazilian offshore oil field

- Location of the field in the Santos Basin
- Country: Brazil
- Region: Santos Basin
- Block: BM-S-8, BM-S-9, BM-S-21
- Offshore/onshore: Offshore
- Coordinates: 25°51′S 43°35′W
- Operator: Petrobras
- Partners: BG Group (30%), Repsol-Sinopec (25%)

Field history
- Discovery: Sep 2007
- Start of production: Dec 2016

Production
- Estimated oil in place: 459 million barrels (~6.26×10^{7} t) initially reported as "up to 33 BBOE"
- Producing formations: Guaratiba Group

The Lapa oil field is a deepwater oil field in the pre-salt Guaratiba Group of the South Atlantic Santos Basin, 270 kilometres (170 mi) off the coast of São Paulo, Brazil. The field lies in water depths of approximately 2,140 metres (7,020 ft). When the discovery of the field was initially reported, it caused widespread commotion because of the speculated size of the field, which surpassed the Mexican Cantarell Complex, the biggest oil field complex outside of the Middle East. The size of Lapa, then known as Carioca and later as Sugar Loaf, was announced as possibly "as large as 33 billion barrels [5.2 billion cubic metres]". Later appraisal of the field drastically reduced the reserves to the current estimate of 459 million barrels (73.0 million cubic metres).

The field was taken into production in December 2016 and is operated by Petrobras with BG and Repsol-Sinopec as partners.

== History ==
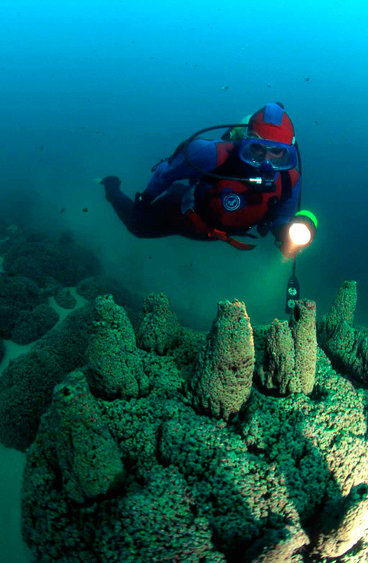
The oil of Lapa Field is stored in microbialite sediments, organic build-ups of microscopic fauna formed in the Early Cretaceous Santos Basin

The field was formerly known as Carioca, named after the demonym for people from Rio de Janeiro, and later renamed to Pão de Açúcar (Sugar Loaf), after the iconic Sugarloaf Mountain of the city. Being discovered in the pre-salt of the Santos Basin after the giant Tupi oil field (2007), then called Tupi, and just before Júpiter in January 2008, the first reports about the reserves caused high expectations. It was speculated and released to the press by a spokesman of the Brazilian national petroleum agency, Agência Nacional do Petróleo (ANP), that "the field could contain reserves as large as 33 billion barrels [5.2 billion cubic metres]" of oil, which would make it the biggest discovery in 30 years and one of the largest oil fields worldwide, the biggest outside of the Middle East, surpassing the Cantarell Complex of the Gulf of Mexico and the Bolivar Coastal Field of the Venezuelan oil belt.

The operator of the field, state oil company Petrobras, refuted this statement as it was "far too early" to know the size of the field while the first appraisal well Sugar Loaf-1 was still drilling. The oil price plummeted after the announcement of the discovery. The excitement about Carioca has been mentioned as an example of "oil fever" in the exploration of the Brazilian deepwater pre-salt plays.

After appraisal of the field, the reserve estimate was downsized to 459 million bbl (73.0 million m^{3}) and taken into production in December 2016.

== Reservoir ==
The reservoir of the Lapa oil field is the pre-salt Guaratiba Group, a Hauterivian to Aptian sequence of limestones and clastic sediments of which the microbialite, stromatolite-like limestone hosts vast amounts of oil. The sediments were deposited in half-grabens in the early stage of the basin evolution, with the Early Cretaceous opening of the South Atlantic caused by the break-up of Gondwana. The carbonate reservoir contains good quality light 26° API oil that was potentially producing at 28 thousand bbl (4.5 thousand m^{3}) per day.

== See also ==
- Campos Basin
- Iara oil field
- Iracema oil field
- Sapinhoá oil field
