= Guaratiba Group =

Geological group of the Santos Basin near Brazil

- Stratigraphic range: Hauterivian-Early Aptian; ~130–120 Ma
- Type: Group
- Sub-units: Piçarras Fm., Itapema Fm., Barra Velha Fm.
- Underlies: Ariri Formation
- Overlies: Camboriú Formation
- Thickness: up to 4,200 m (13,800 ft)

Lithology
- Primary: Limestone (coquina), marl, shale, siltstone
- Other: Sandstone, conglomerate

Location
- Coordinates: 26°6′S 43°43′W
- Region: Santos Basin, South Atlantic
- Country: Brazil

Type section
- Named for: Guaratiba
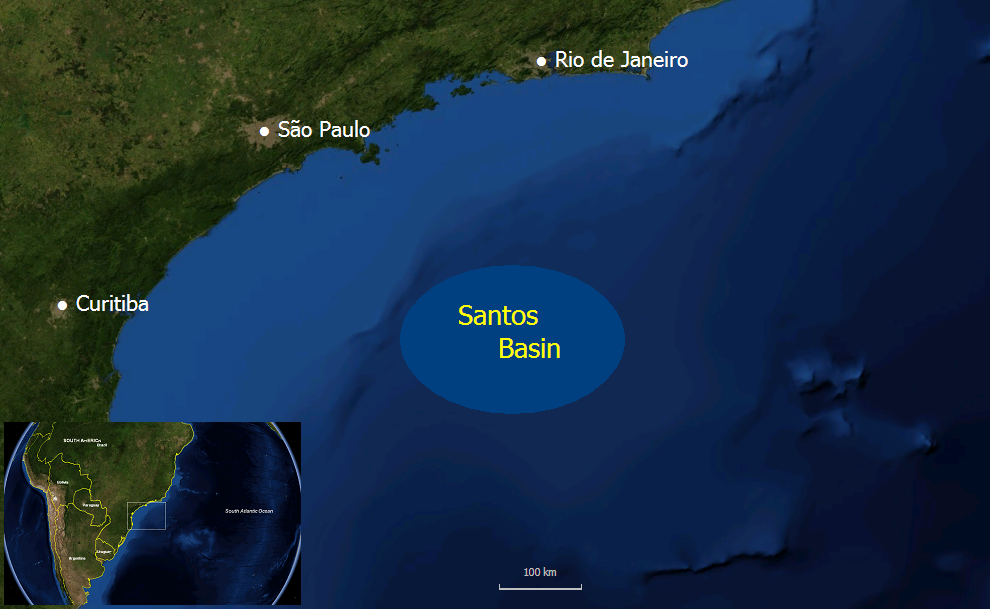
- Location of the Santos Basin

The Guaratiba Group (Portuguese: Grupo Guaratiba) is a geological group of the Santos Basin offshore of the Brazilian states of Rio de Janeiro, São Paulo, Paraná and Santa Catarina. The group forms the pre-salt layer in the petroleum-rich basin and hosts the biggest oil fields of Brazil, as Tupi, Júpiter and many more. The group contains, depending on the definition, three to four formations and dates to the Early Cretaceous period; Hauterivian to Early Aptian epochs. The total thickness of the group, representing the first phase of sedimentation after the break-up of Gondwana in the Santos Basin, is estimated at 4,200 metres (13,800 ft).

== Etymology ==
The formation is named after Guaratiba, a neighbourhood in the west of Rio de Janeiro.

== Description ==
The Guaratiba Group is 4,200 metres (13,800 ft) thick and subdivided into three formations, four if the underlying basalts of the Camboriú Formation are included, and five if the salt layer of the Ariri Formation is included, from old to young the Piçarras, Itapema, and Barra Velha Formations.

=== Subdivision ===
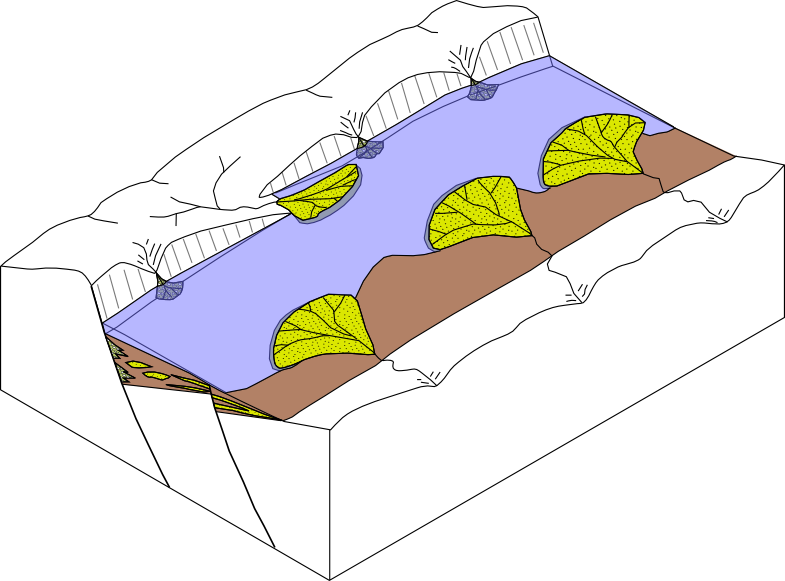
The Guaratiba Group of the Santos Basin was deposited in half-grabens of the opening South Atlantic

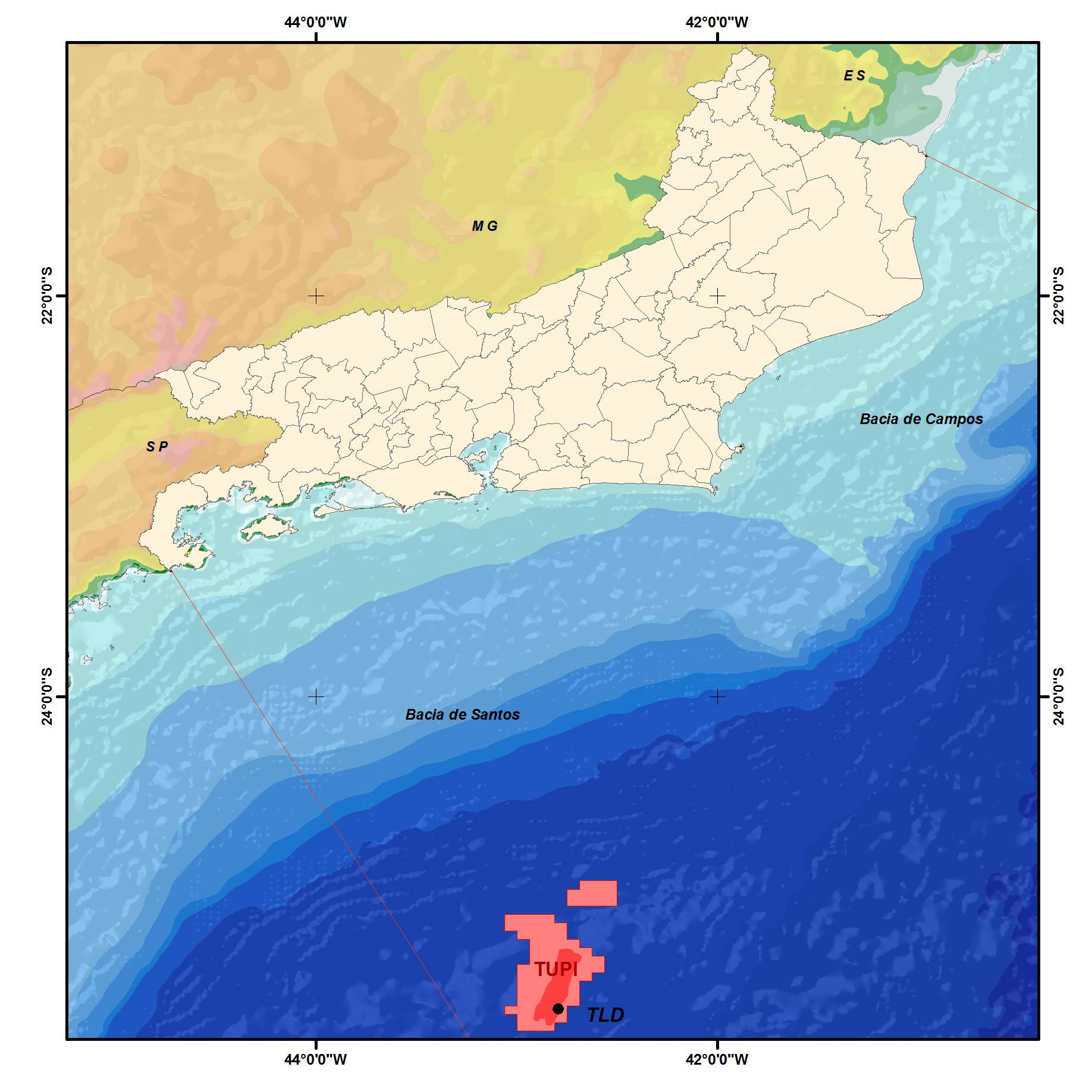
The Tupi prospect, later renamed to Tupi field, honouring the Tupi people, was the first giant field of many found in the pre-salt Guaratiba Group

Piçarras Formation

The Piçarras Formation is 990 metres (3,250 ft) thick and consists of clastic and carbonate rocks. The formation includes reddish polymictic conglomerates, with clasts of basalt and quartz in a clay-sandy matrix. It also includes white, reddish lacustrine coquinas (shelly limestones) and sandstones, siltstones and shales of stevensite composition. Its age, based on the ostracod assemblages, is Hauterivian to Aptian.

The conglomerates and sandstones of the formation are representative of an alluvial environment. The coquinas represent a shallow lacustrine environment. Similar to the Atafona Formation of the Campos Basin, the sandstones, stevensite-bearing siltstones and shales represent an alkaline lacustrine environment affected by volcanic activity. The shales represent deeper lacustrine waters in more distal areas. The alternation of the two facies implies a series of alluvial progradation-retractions into the Early Cretaceous carbonate lakes. The low textural and compositional maturity of conglomerates and sandstones implies the basin was supplied from areas close to the basin margins.

Itapema Formation

The Itapema Formation is several hundreds of metres thick and consists of calcirudites (limestones) and dark shales. The calcirudite limestones consist of fragmented bivalve shells, frequently dolomitized and silicified. In more distal sections, the formation consists of dark organic matter rich shales. In the well 1-RSJ-625, the formation includes 110 metres (360 ft) of radioactive shales interbedded with carbonates. These facies are thought to represent a lacustrine environment. The organic matter-rich shales are one of the main source rocks of the Santos Basin. This formation is correlative with the Coqueiros Formation in the Campos Basin. The age of the Itapema Formation is Barremian to Aptian.

Barra Velha Formation

The Barra Velha Formation is approximately 300 to 350 metres (980 to 1,150 ft) thick. In the proximal sections, the formation comprises limestones of stromatolites and laminated microbialites. In the distal sections, it is composed of shales. Interbedded with the laminated microbialites there are limestones with packstone and grainstone textures made up of algal clasts and bioclasts (fragmented ostracods). The carbonates frequently are partly or completely dolomitized. These facies represent a transitional continental and shallow marine environment. The age of this formation has been estimated to be Late Barremian to Aptian. It is correlative with the Macabu Formation in the Campos Basin, as both are typified by laminated microbialites and stromatolites. These limestones are one of the sub-salt reservoirs in the Santos Basin, most notably of the giant Tupi and initially reported as supergiant Lapa Fields.

=== Petroleum geology ===
The formation hosts the important pre-salt reservoir rocks of the Santos Basin.

Field	Year	Operator	Reserves (in place unless otherwise noted)	Notes
Sagitário	2013	Petrobras		
Libra	2011	Petrobras	8,000–12,000 million bbl (1,300–1,900 million m^{3}) (recoverable)	
Búzios	2010	Petrobras	3,058 million bbl (486 million m^{3})	
Iara	2008	Petrobras	3,000–4,000 million bbl (480–640 million m^{3})	
Iracema	2008	Petrobras		
Júpiter	2008	Petrobras	1,600 million bbl (250 million m^{3}); 17 trillion cu ft (480 billion m^{3})	
Sapinhoá	2008	Petrobras	1,100–2,000 million bbl (170–320 million m^{3})	
Lapa	2007	Petrobras	459 million bbl (73.0 million m^{3})	
Tupi	2006	Petrobras	8,000 million bbl (1,300 million m^{3})	

== See also ==
- Campos Basin
- Pre-salt layer
