= Búzios oil field =

Brazilian offshore oil field

- Location of the field in the Santos Basin
- Country: Brazil
- Region: Santos Basin
- Block: BM-S-11
- Offshore/onshore: Offshore
- Coordinates: 24°47′22″S 42°19′08″W
- Operator: Petrobras

Field history
- Discovery: 2010

Production
- Current production of oil: 605,600 barrels per day (~3.018×10^{7} t/a)
- Year of current production of oil: 2024
- Estimated oil in place: 3,058 million barrels (~4.172×10^{8} t)
- Producing formations: Guaratiba Group

Búzios oil field is a large ultra-deepwater oil field located in the Santos Basin, about 230 km (140 mi) off the coast of Rio de Janeiro, Brazil. Originally named Franco oil field, it was the second largest pre-salt find in the basin since 2007, behind Tupi oil field, which holds between 5 and 8 billion barrels (790 and 1,270 million cubic metres) equivalent and is located just south of the Búzios oil field.

== Etymology ==
The field was named after Búzios, Rio de Janeiro.

== History ==
The field was discovered in May 2010 with an encounter of light oil which measured 30° API. The find was announced on May 14, 2010, however the Brazilian authorities claim the second well named Libra proved to be even larger than Búzios oil field. Libra is located 31 kilometres (19 mi) from Búzios and was drilled by Petrobras, contracted by the Brazilian National Agency of Petroleum (ANP). It was also announced that Franco was not linked to Iara field located near the discovery. Búzios was owned by ANP, who paid Petrobras a total of $150 million to drill the well.

== Reservoir ==
The region the reservoir is located in is 200 kilometres (120 mi) wide and 800 kilometres (500 mi) long. The pre-salt reservoir of the Guaratiba Group is located at a water depth of 2,000 metres (6,600 ft) and under 5,000 metres (16,000 ft) of overburden. The field is estimated to contain 3,058 million bbl (486.2 million m^{3}), down from an initial estimate of 4.5 billion bbl (720 million m^{3}). The rock layer is 272 metres (892 ft) thick which makes it less difficult for production. ANP official stated there was no gas discovered in the prospect, making the field more profitable and easier to develop.

== See also ==
- Campos Basin
- Iara oil field
- Libra oil field
- Tupi oil field
