= Libra oil field =

Oil field in Santos Basin, Brazil

Libra
- Country: Brazil
- Location: Santos Basin
- Block: BM S 11
- Offshore/onshore: offshore
- Operator: Petrobras

Field history
- Discovery: 2010

Production
- Current production of oil: 0 barrels per day (~0 t/a)
- Recoverable oil: 7,900 million barrels (~1.1×10^{9} t)

Libra oil field is a large ultra-deepwater oil prospect located in the Santos Basin, about 230 kilometres (140 mi) off the coast of Rio de Janeiro, Brazil, north of Tupi field. Libra is in the process of being tested and may turn out to be the largest pre-salt find in the basin, ahead of the Tupi oil field, making the largest find since Cantarell Field in 1976. National Agency of Petroleum (ANP) officials are confident Libra will contain even more recoverable oil than Franco oil field.

== History ==
The field was discovered in May 2010 at the same time as the Franco prospect. Libra is located 19 miles (31 km) from Franco and is being drilled by Petrobras contracted by the ANP. Officials confirmed that Franco and Libra are not linked to the nearby Iara field.

On 14 July 2010, the first exploration well collapsed when it reached an underwater salt bed. A second layer of hydrocarbons was found in late December 2010.

Eleven companies including CNOOC, CNPC, Ecopetrol, Mitsui, ONGC Videsh (OVL), Petrogal, Petrobras, Petronas, Repsol-Sinopec, Shell and Total were approved by ANP to participate in the Libra auction. Of these, only nine paid financial guarantees to ANP.

Production rights were awarded 21 October 2013 to a consortium led by Petrobras, including France's TotalEnergies and Anglo-Dutch Royal Dutch Shell Plc, who each took 20 percent of the partnership, while China National Petroleum Corp and China's CNOOC took 10 percent each. Petrobras has a 40% interest. Major investments are expected to be made in 2018–2019, but the firms will work to start production as soon as possible. Pre-Sal Petroleo SA, or PPSA, a Brazilian government-run firm, will manage development of the country's recently discovered deep-water oil fields. It named Oswaldo Pedrosa as manager of the company on 14 October 2013.

== Ownership ==
The Libra field is owned by a consortium of five companies. Petrobras owns 40%, Royal Dutch Shell and Total each hold 20%, and CNPC and CNOOC both own 10%. Petrobras also acts as the operator.

== Reservoir ==
The region the reservoir is located in is 200 kilometres (120 mi) wide and 800 kilometres (500 mi) long. The oil lies under 2,000 metres (6,600 ft) of water and further 5,000 metres (16,000 ft) under sand, rock and shifting salt layer. According to consultancy firm Gaffney, Cline & Associates the field's reserves are 3.7 to 15 billion barrels (590×10^{6} to 2,380×10^{6} m^{3}) "with the most probable estimate being 7.9 billion barrels (1.26×10^{9} m^{3})".

== See also ==
- Campos Basin
