= Rio de Janeiro Petrochemical Complex =

Petrochemical facility in Brazil

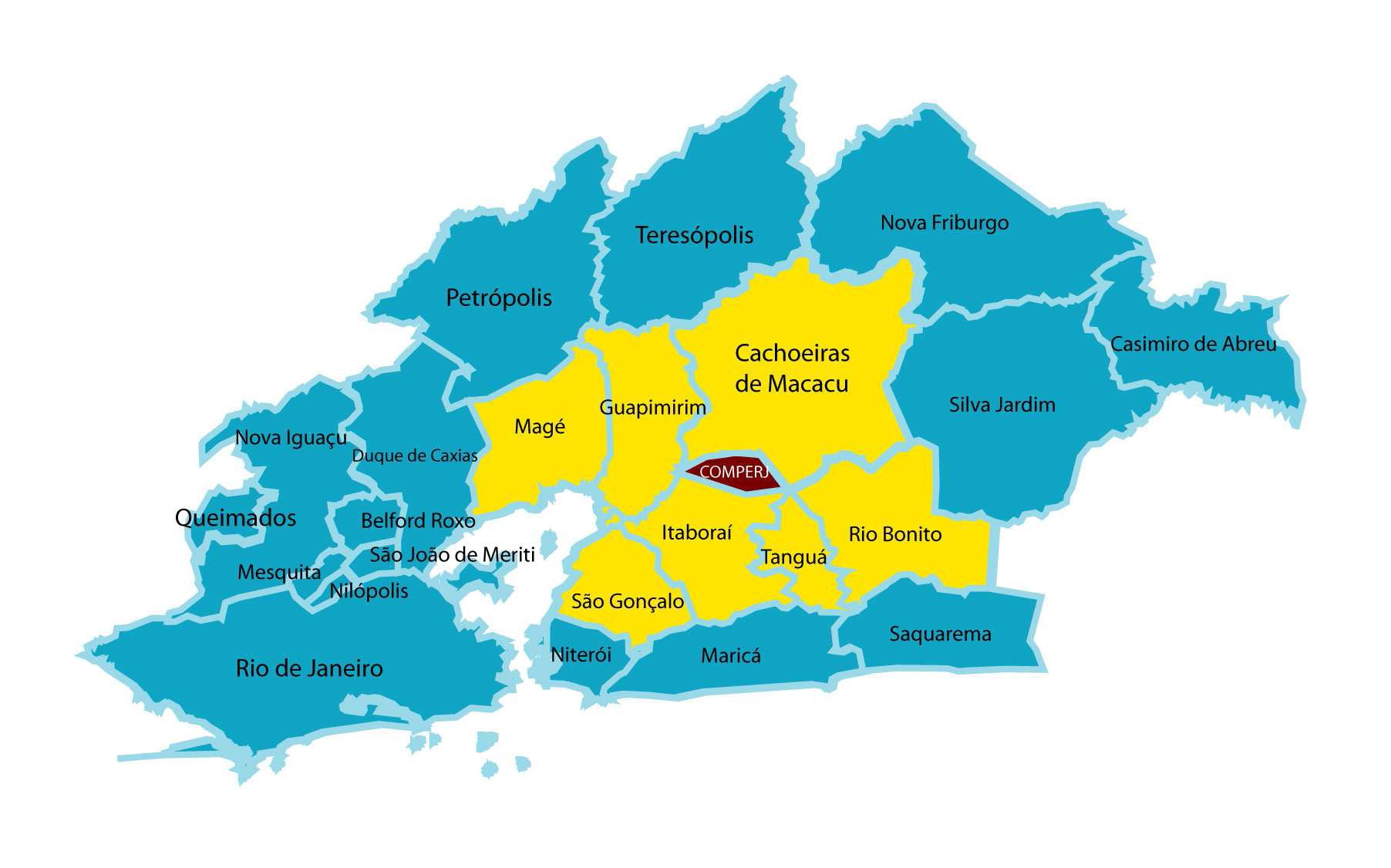
Political map of COMPERJ

The Rio de Janeiro Petrochemical Complex, (Brazilian Portuguese: Complexo Petroquímico do Rio de Janeiro; abbreviated as COMPERJ), is a petrochemical facility in Itaboraí, Rio de Janeiro, Brazil built by Petrobras on a 45 km^{2} piece of land making it the largest single enterprise by Petrobras and one of the largest industrial facilities in the world. It was heavily involved in Operation Car Wash, a large and widespread criminal investigation by Brazilian police, to which its license of operation was revoked leading to high numbers of unemployment and debt.

== Operation ==
The facility contains a refining unit with a processing capacity of 165,000 barrels of oil per day. Initially, it was planned to use heavy oil from the Marlim oil field located in Campos Basin, a few kilometers north of Rio de Janeiro. In addition to the refining unit, a first-generation basic petrochemicals unit (ethylene, benzene, p-xylene and propylene) and six second-generation petrochemicals units were planned to be built. The main thermoplastic resins to be produced by the second generation petrochemical units will be polypropylene (850 thousand tons/year), polyethylene (800 thousand tons/year) and polyethylene terephthalate.(600 thousand tons/year).

In addition to the production units, a large utility center will be built, responsible for supplying water, steam and electrical energy necessary for the operation of the complex.

== See also ==
- Arco Metropolitano do Rio de Janeiro
- Campos Basin oil spill
- Corruption in Brazil
