= Júpiter Field =

Brazilian offshore oil field

Júpiter
- Location of the field in the Santos Basin
- Country: Brazil
- Region: Santos Basin
- Block: BM-S-24
- Offshore/onshore: Offshore
- Coordinates: 25°40′15″S 41°10′20″W
- Operator: Petrobras
- Partners: Galp Energia

Field history
- Discovery: Jan 2008

Production
- Estimated oil in place: 1,600 million barrels (~2.2×10^{8} t)
- Estimated gas in place: 17,000×10^{9} cu ft (480×10^{9} m^{3})
- Producing formations: Barremian-Lower Aptian Guaratiba Group

On January 21, 2008, Petrobras announced the discovery of the Júpiter Field, a huge natural gas and condensate (very light oil) field which could equal the Tupi oil field in size (5-8 billion BOE). It is located in the Santos Basin, 37 km (23 mi) east of Tupi, 5,100 m (16,730 ft) below the bottom of the Atlantic Ocean in a water depth of 2,187 m (7,175 ft), 290 km (180 mi) from Rio de Janeiro.

== Description ==
The main reservoir of Júpiter is the pre-salt Guaratiba Group. The field is estimated to contain 1,600 million barrels (250 million cubic metres) of oil and 17 trillion cubic feet (480 billion cubic metres) of gas.

== See also ==
- Campos Basin
- Iara oil field
- Iracema oil field
- Tupi oil field
