= Cadent Gas =

UK regional gas distribution company

Cadent Gas Ltd.
- Type: Limited company
- Industry: Natural gas
- Founded: October 1, 2016; 10 years ago (as National Grid Gas Distribution Ltd.)
- Headquarters: Coventry, England, UK
- Area served: South Yorkshire, North West England, West Midlands, East Midlands, East of England and North London
- Key people: Steve Fraser, Chief Executive Officer
- Products: Gas distribution
- Owner: A consortium including: Macquarie Infrastructure and Real Assets, CIC Capital, Allianz Capital Partners, Hermes Investment Management, Qatar Investment Authority, Dalmore Capital and Amber Infrastructure
- Number of employees: 6000+
- Website: www.cadentgas.com

Cadent Gas is a British regional gas distribution company that manages and maintains the largest natural gas distribution network in the United Kingdom, transporting gas to 11 million homes and businesses across South Yorkshire, North West England, West Midlands, East Midlands, East of England and North London.

== Structure and activities ==
Cadent Gas manages four of the eight gas distribution networks in the United Kingdom. Following production and importation, gas passes through the national transmission system, before entering the distribution networks. The distribution network providers, which include Cadent Gas, then transport the gas to the end consumer.

The company also manages the national gas emergency service free phone line in the UK, and helps to raise awareness of the dangers of carbon monoxide poisoning, and safety precautions that can be taken to try to avoid this.

In 2017/18 Cadent Gas replaced and improved 1,625 kilometres (1,010 mi) of mains pipes.

== History ==
- 1986: British Gas plc is privatised.
- 1997: Demerger of Centrica from British Gas.
- 2000: Demerger of Lattice from BG.
- 2002: Merger of National Grid and Lattice Transco.
- 2005: Sale of four gas distribution networks, and adoption of National Grid as the single name for principal businesses.
- 2016: Creation of National Grid Gas Distribution Ltd as part of National Grid.
- 2017: Sale of a majority stake of National Grid Gas Distribution in March, with operations beginning under the Cadent brand from May.
- 2019: Sale of National Grid's remaining stake in Cadent, to the Quadgas consortium.
- 2022: A major outage took place on the Cadent Gas network in Stannington, Sheffield, affecting thousands of properties for more than a week amid below-freezing temperatures; Sheffield City Council declared a major incident. The outage was caused by a burst water main.
