= John Parker (businessman) =

Businessman from the United Kingdom, born 1942

Sir John Parker GBE FREng
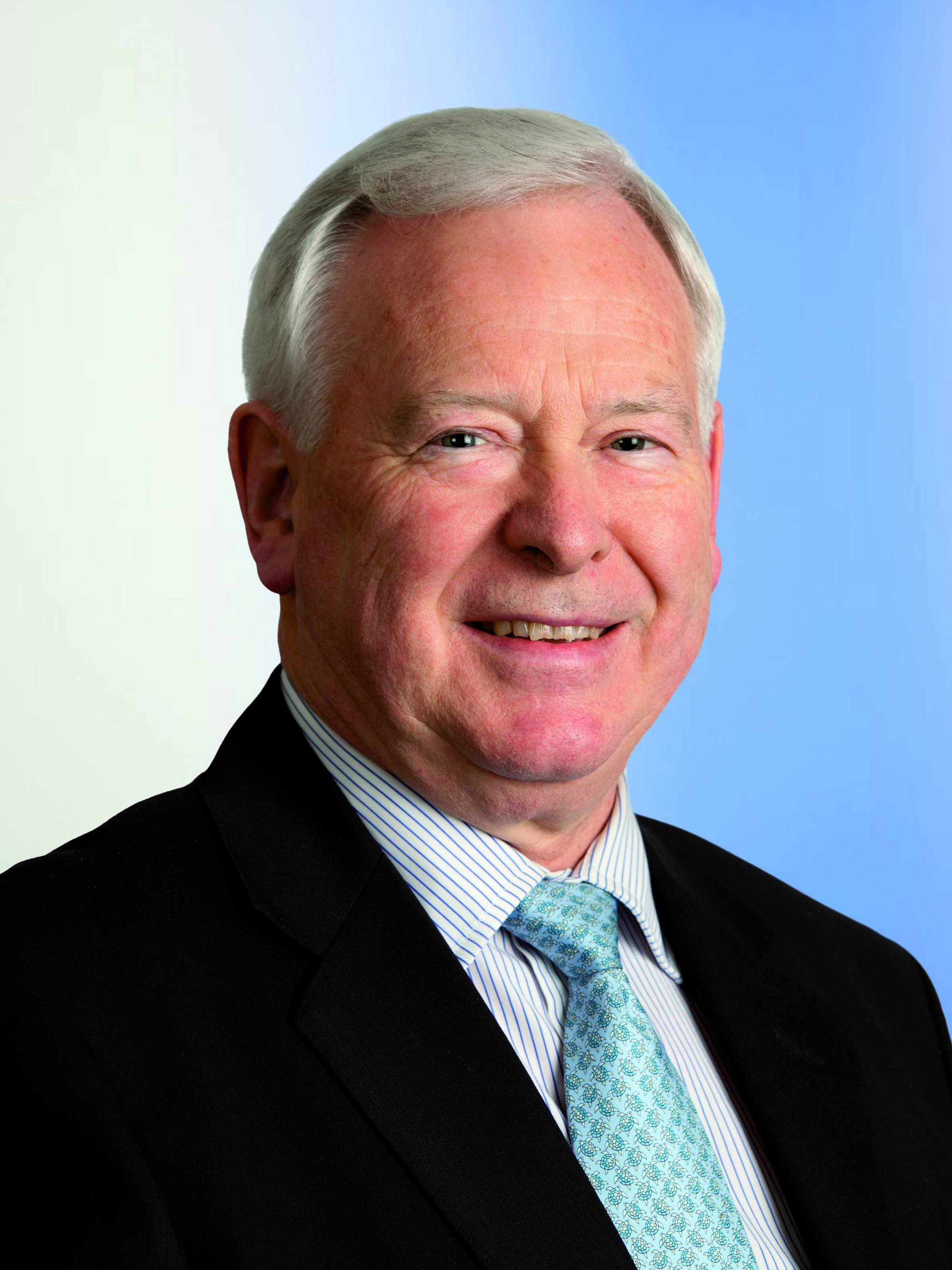
- Parker in 2011
- Born: 8 April 1942 (age 84); County Down, Northern Ireland

Sir Thomas John Parker (born 8 April 1942) is a British businessman. He is chairman of Laing O'Rourke and former chairman of Pennon Group, a director of Carnival Corporation & plc and lead non-executive director at the Cabinet Office. He has been a director or chairman of numerous other public companies including Airbus, Anglo American plc, Babcock International, British Gas, DP World, Lattice Group, National Grid plc and Ombu Group. He is a past president of the Royal Academy of Engineering, patron at the Centre for Process Innovation and a Visiting Fellow of the University of Oxford.

== Early life ==
Parker was born into a farming family in County Down, Northern Ireland. He attended Belfast College of Technology (since 1991 called Belfast Metropolitan College). In 1958, at age 17, he joined Harland and Wolff as an apprentice naval architect (engineer). At Queen's University Belfast he was awarded an Honorary DSc degree in Mechanical Engineering and Naval Architecture.

== Career ==
- 1958–1963 Apprenticeship at Harland & Wolff
- 1963–1974 Member of ship design team at Harland & Wolff
- 1974–1978 Managing Director of Austin & Pickersgill
- 1978–1983 Deputy Chief Executive of board of the British Shipbuilders Corporation
- 1983–1993 Chairman and Chief Executive of Harland and Wolff
- 1983–1986 Non-Executive Director of Industrial Development Board of Northern Ireland
- 1983–1986 Non-Executive Director of British Coal Corporation
- 1993–2002 Non-Executive Director of The Royal Navy and Royal Marines Charity
- 1993–2000 Chief Executive of Babcock International
- 1994–2000 Chairman and Chief Executive of Babcock International
- 1997–2000 Non-Executive Director of British Gas
- 1999–2003 Chairman of Firth Rixson Limited
- 2000–2003 Non-executive director and subsequently deputy chairman of P&O Princess Cruises
- 2000–2002 Chairman of Lattice Group
- 2000–present Director of Carnival plc
- 2001–2003 Non-Executive Director of Brambles
- 2002–2005 Chairman of RMC Group
- 2002–2011 Chairman of National Grid plc
- 2003–present Non-Executive Director of Carnival Corporation
- 2005–2006 Chairman of P&O
- 2006–2011 Chancellor of the University of Southampton
- 2007–2015 Director and vice-chairman of DP World
- 2007–2018 Non-executive director of Airbus Group
- 2008 Non-executive chairman of BVT Surface Fleet
- 2009–2017 Chairman of Anglo American plc
- 2011–2018 Non-executive chairman of Ombu Group
- 2011–2014 President of the Royal Academy of Engineering
- 2011–2014 Member of the Prime Minister's Committee of Science & Technology
- 2015–2020 chairman of Pennon Group
- 2017–present chairman of Laing O'Rourke
- 2017–present lead non-executive director at the Cabinet Office

== The Parker Review ==
Between 2016 and 2022, Parker was Chair of the eponymous Parker Review, an independent review which considers how to improve the ethnic and cultural diversity of UK boards to better reflect their employee base and the communities they serve. The first review, published in 2017, set out seven recommendations, including a "One by '21" target. Its aim was that all FTSE 100 boards should have at least one director from an ethnic minority background by December 2021. This was a relative success, with 89 FTSE 100 companies and 128 FTSE 250 companies having ethnic minority representation on their boards as of 31 December 2021.

== Recognition ==
He was knighted for services to defence and shipbuilding in 2001. He was the Chancellor of the University of Southampton from 2006 to 2011, as well as being a governor of the Royal National Lifeboat Institution. Other appointments have included membership of the Prime Minister's Business Council for Britain and non-executive director at the Bank of England. He was President of the Royal Institution of Naval Architects from 1996 to 1999. In 2012, he was made a Knight Grand Cross of the Order of the British Empire (GBE), for services to Industry and to the voluntary sector. He was conferred with Honorary Fellowship of the Institution of Engineers and Shipbuilders in Scotland (HonFIES) in 2012. He was elected a Fellow of the Royal Academy of Engineering (FREng) in 1983. He was elected as an Honorary Fellow of the Institution of Engineering and Technology (HonFIET) in 2014.

== Personal life ==
Parker married Emma, a former Latin teacher and pianist, in 1967; they have two children. Parker is a member of the Royal Yacht Squadron.

Professional and academic associations
Preceded by Alec Broers, Baron Broers	President of the Royal Academy of Engineering; September 2011– August 2014	Succeeded by Dame Ann Dowling
Academic offices
Preceded by John Palmer, 4th Earl of Selborne	Chancellor of the University of Southampton; 2006–2011	Succeeded by Dame Helen Alexander
Business positions
Preceded by Sir Mark Moody-Stuart	Chairman of Anglo American plc 2009–	Succeeded by Incumbent (to 31 October 2017)
Preceded by Jeffrey Sterling, Baron Sterling of Plaistow	Chairman of P&O; 2005–2006	Succeeded by Incumbent vice president, DP World following take over
Preceded by James Hood Ross OBE prior to merger with Lattice Group	Chairman of National Grid plc 2002–2011	Succeeded by Sir Peter Gershon
Preceded by John King, Baron King of Wartnaby	Chairman of Babcock International; 1994–2000	Succeeded by Gordon Arden Campbell CBE, FREng
