= Chris Finlayson (businessman) =

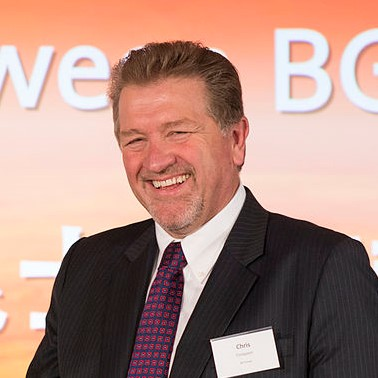
- Born: Christopher Geoffrey Finlayson; April 1956 (age 70)
- Education: University of Manchester
- Occupation: Businessman
- Years active: 1977–present
- Title: former CEO of BG Group plc (from 1 January 2013)
- Term: 2013–2014
- Predecessor: Sir Frank Chapman
- Successor: Andrew Gould
- Board member of: BG Group

Christopher Geoffrey Finlayson (born April 1956) is a British businessman who was the chief executive of BG Group plc, a British multinational oil and gas company, for 16 months until 28 April 2014.

== Early life ==
Christopher Geoffrey Finlayson was born in April 1956. He graduated in 1977 from the University of Manchester with a BSc in Physics and Geology.

== Career ==
Finlayson joined BG Group in August 2010, and has been Managing Director of BG Advance and a main board director of BG Group since 15 November 2011. He succeeded Sir Frank Chapman as Group Chief Executive on 1 January 2013. He was previously employed by Shell for over 30 years, rising to Executive Vice President of Global Solutions Upstream, Royal Dutch Shell plc.

He resigned on 28 April 2014, and has been replaced on an interim basis by the current Chairman Andrew Gould.
