= Badejo Field =

Oil field in Campos Basin, Brazil

Badejo Field is an offshore oil field in Brazil. It is a mature oil field located in the southwest part of the Campos Basin 80 kilometres (50 mi) off the coast. Above of it is laying partly the Membro Siri (sometimes referred just as Siri) extra heavy crude oil field with and 12.8° API gravity. Oil was discovered in the Membro Siri reservoir in 1975, but was considered uneconomical to develop this time.

In 2008 the FPSO Petrojarl Cidade de Rio das Ostras started test production of the Siri crude. Part of the process equipment on the FPSO is an electrostatic coalescer with the VIEC technology from Hamworthy. The process system was delivered by Expro. It consists of two separator stages and the electrostatic coalescer. Using high processing temperature the process system is designed to output crude oil with an export specification of 1% BS&W.
