= Campos Basin oil spill =

On November 7, 2011, a Chevron owned oil well began leaking causing 32,000 to 52,000 litres (200 to 330 bbl) of crude oil to enter the ocean every day. The leak took place in Campos Basin, Brazil 120 kilometres (75 mi; 65 nmi) off the coast of Rio de Janeiro. At first, Chevron claimed that the leak was most likely due to a seep in the ocean floor but later admitted that they had made a miscalculation. Chevron says that they underestimated the amount pressure that the reservoir would exert on the oil well and says that heavier mud should have been used to seal the well. 590,000 litres (155,000 US gal) of oil were spilled over the course of four days until the well was finally sealed.

After the oil spill, 18 ships were sent out into the ocean to clean the spill. There was little documented environmental impact, and the oil never reached the shores of Rio. Following the spill, Brazilian prosecutors filed a lawsuit for 40 billion reais ($18 billion), but in September 2013, Chevron and Brazilian officials reached a settlement of 300 million reais ($135 million).

== See also ==
- Lago Agrio oil field
- Orinoco Mining Arc
