= Helen Alexander (businesswoman) =

British businesswoman (1957–2017)

Dame Helen Alexander DBE
- Born: Helen Anne Alexander; 10 February 1957; Geneva, Switzerland
- Died: 5 August 2017 (aged 60)
- Education: St Paul's Girls' School; Hertford College, Oxford; INSEAD
- Occupation: Businesswoman

Dame Helen Anne Alexander DBE (10 February 1957 – 5 August 2017) was a British businesswoman. She held numerous directorships and served as the chairman of UBM plc and president of the Confederation of British Industry (CBI). She was made a Dame (DBE) in 2011, and in 2016 was awarded the Legion d'Honneur. She was chancellor of the University of Southampton from 2011 to 2017.

== Early life ==
Alexander was born in Geneva to Bernard Alexander, a British lawyer who worked for the United Nations High Commissioner for Refugees, and Tania Benckendorff. Her mother was Russian (with roots in Estonia) and her maternal grandmother was Moura Budberg, adventuress, muse, and suspected double agent. Through her, Helen Alexander was related to Nick Clegg, sometime deputy prime minister, whose paternal grandmother, Kira von Engelhardt, Baroness von Smolensk, was Budberg's niece.

Alexander was educated at St Paul's Girls' School in London. She earned an MA degree in geography from Hertford College, Oxford in 1978 and an MBA from INSEAD in 1984.

== Career ==
She began a career in publishing at Faber and Faber. She joined the Economist Group as a marketing executive in 1985. From 1997 to 2008 she was chief executive of the Economist Group, during which time profits greatly increased and the circulation of The Economist more than doubled.

In 2004, she was appointed CBE for services to publishing. Alexander's numerous directorships included Huawei Technologies, Esure Group Holdings, Rolls-Royce Group, Incisive Media, Thomson-Reuters, UBM plc and Bain Capital. In 2011, she was the first female president of the Confederation of British Industry (CBI) and was promoted to DBE for services to business.

She was a trustee of Sir Tim Berners-Lee's World Wide Web Foundation, and was chairman of the Port of London Authority from January 2010 until 31 December 2015. From September 2011 she was chancellor of the University of Southampton, the first woman in that role. Her appointment at Southampton attracted some criticism from the student body over Alexander's role at Rolls-Royce, given the company's role in the arms trade.

She was an honorary fellow of Hertford College, Oxford, and sat on the board of the Said Business School, University of Oxford.

== Personal life ==
Alexander spoke fluent French. In 1985, she married media executive Tim Suter; they had three children, including actor Leo Suter. She was diagnosed with cancer in 2014 and died three years later. She was survived by her husband and children.

Academic offices
Preceded by Sir John Parker	Chancellor of the University of Southampton; 2011–2017	Succeeded by Ruby Wax
Business positions
Preceded by	Executive Chairman of UBM plc 2014–2017	Succeeded by TBD
