= Miskar gas field =

Natural gas field in the Gulf of Gabès, offshore Tunisia

Miskar
- Country: Tunisia
- Region: Gulf of Gabès
- Offshore/onshore: offshore
- Operator: BG Group

Field history
- Discovery: 1975
- Start of production: 1996

Production
- Current production of gas: 5.7×10^{6} m^{3}/d 200×10^{6} cu ft/d 2×10^{9} m^{3}/a (71×10^{9} cu ft/a)
- Estimated gas in place: 43×10^{9} m^{3} 1.5×10^{12} cu ft

The Miskar gas field is a natural gas field located in the Gulf of Gabès, offshore of Tunisia. Discovered in 1975, it was developed by BG Group, beginning production of natural gas and condensates in 1996. By 2005 the total proven reserves of the Miskar gas field were around 1.5 trillion ft^{3} (43 km^{3}), with a production rate of around 200 million ft^{3}/day (5.7×10^{5} m^{3}).
