= Albacora-Leste oil field =

Oil field in Campos Basin, Brazil

Albacora-Leste Oil Field
- Country: Brazil
- Region: Campos Basin
- Offshore/onshore: offshore
- Operator: Petrobras

Field history
- Discovery: 1986
- Start of production: 1987

Production
- Current production of oil: 180,000 barrels per day (~9.0×10^{6} t/a)
- Estimated oil in place: 72 million tonnes (~ 84.9×10^{6} m^{3} or 534 million bbl)
- Estimated gas in place: 5.2×10^{9} m^{3} 183×10^{9} cu ft

The Albacora-Leste Oil Field is an oil field located in Campos Basin. It was discovered in 1986 and developed by Petrobras. The oil field is operated by Petrobras, that owns 90% of the field, while Repsol owns the remaining 10%. The total proven reserves of the Albacora-Leste oil field are around 534 million barrels (72 million tonnes), and production is centered on 180,000 barrels per day (29,000 m^{3}/d). In April 2022, Petro Rio (through its subsidiary Petro Rio Jaguar Petróleo), acquired a 90% operating stake in the Albacora Leste field Petróleo Brasileiro (Petrobras) for $2.2bn USD.

== Geology ==
The Albacora field consists of several producing horizons of Albian to Miocene sandstone turbidites, with an area of 235 km^{2}. Reflection seismology in 1972 disclosed a faulted anticline and seismic amplitude bright spot, which was drilled by wildcat 1-RJS-297 in 1984 and discovered oil. The stratigraphy of the Campos Basin starts with the Lower Cretaceous Lago Feia Formation a source rock, followed by the Albian Macae Formation consisting of shallow water carbonates overlain by late Albian shales, marls, calcilutites, and turbidite sandstones. From this formation through most of the Cenozoic, the Campos Formation was deposited, consisting of deep water turbiditic sandstones and shales, the main producers in the Albacora and Marlim fields. Finally, the basin was filled by the Ubatuba Formation, consisting of slope and shelf deposits.
