= 2022 Sheffield gas supply outage =

Major gas supply outage in December 2022 in Sheffield, England

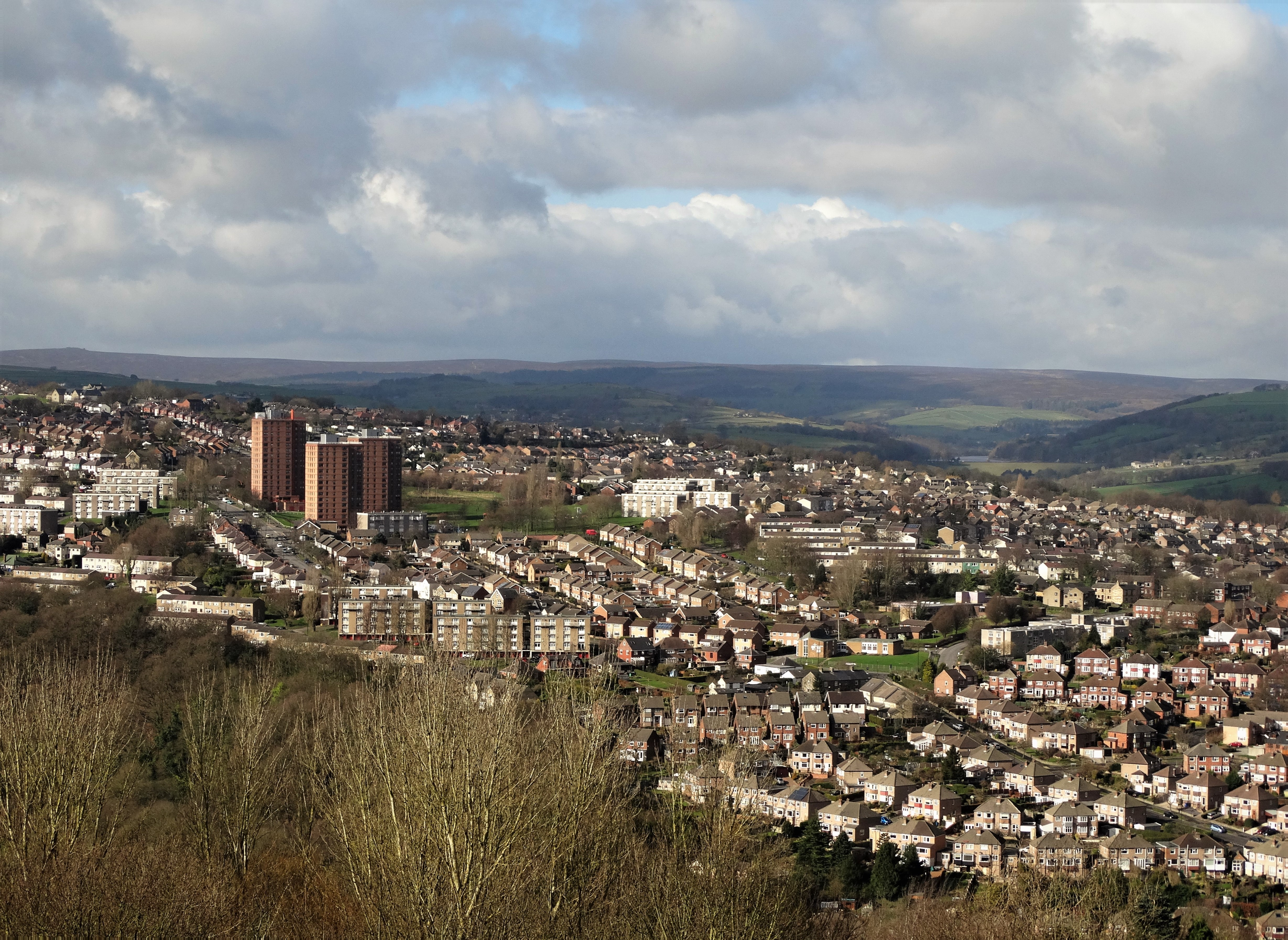
- Overview of Stannington, the worst affected area. The burst water main occurred high on the hillside on the left side of the image, with water flowing down the hillside through gas pipes under roads.

- 2022 Sheffield gas supply outage (Sheffield) 2022 Sheffield gas supply outage (Yorkshire and the Humber) 2022 Sheffield gas supply outage (the United Kingdom)
- Date: 2–15 December 2022
- Duration: 13 days
- Location: Hillsborough and Stannington, Sheffield; 53.393587°N 1.547911°W
- Type: Natural gas supply outage
- Cause: Burst water main, resulting in widespread flooding of the gas supply network
- Participants: Cadent Gas, Northern Powergrid, Sheffield City Council, Yorkshire Water
- Outcome: 3,000+ properties affected

The city of Sheffield, England was impacted by a major failure of the local natural gas supply network in December 2022, resulting in a loss of central heating and gas stove availability to more than 3,000 properties in the northwestern suburbs of the city. The outage, which has predominantly affected the Hillsborough, Malin Bridge and Stannington districts, was declared a major incident by Sheffield City Council; some properties were without a gas supply for almost two weeks.

The gas supply outage affected the Cadent Gas network, and was caused by a burst water main on the Yorkshire Water network which resulted in more than 2 million litres of water flooding into the gas supply network. Yorkshire Water confirmed that the breach to the water main had been resolved by 6 December. In addition to the widespread gas supply outage, numerous properties in the affected areas have also suffered from outages to their water and electricity supplies as knock-on effects.

Heavy rainfall initially hampered recovery work, followed by cold temperatures and snowfall. In response to the widespread lack of heating availability and increasingly cold temperatures, dropping as low as −3 °C (27 °F) on 9 December, a major incident was declared by local authorities. The Red Cross distributed aid, including food, drinks and blankets, to residents in the affected area.

== Timeline ==
During the evening of 2 December, a water main on Bankfield Lane at the western end of Stannington burst, resulting in flooding in the local area. The affected water main was an asbestos-cement mainline pipe installed in 1970. More than 2 million litres of water, roughly equivalent to three Olympic-sized swimming pools, entered the gas mains in this area and subsequently flowed through pipes down hillsides throughout the Stannington and Hillsborough areas.

Property damage was reported in dozens of homes across the affected area, including on High Matlock Road, as water overflowed out of gas meters and gas stoves inside homes; water also overflowed out of manhole covers and the bases of street lights in outdoor areas. Emergency services attended the incident from around midnight, going from door to door to wake residents. Cadent Gas, who operate the natural gas network in the area, described the incident as "unpredecented" and something which they had never had to deal with before.

By 3 December more than 1,000 properties were without a gas supply; in addition, many properties in the immediate area of the burst water main also suffered from reduced water supplies, or no water at all, for several days. Engineers from Cadent Gas initially had to go from door to door and turn off the gas supply at each individual affected property, before engineers could commence work to drain and repair the gas network; more than 100 engineers were drafted in to work 24 hours a day to resolve the outage, later rising to more than 200 as the incident progressed.

The number of properties affected by the gas supply outage rose to more than 2,000 by 6 December, increasingly affecting homes lower down the hillside in the Hillsborough area of Sheffield. Local electricity network operator Northern Powergrid warned local residents to only use portable electric heaters in occupied rooms and only while residents were at home, in order to reduce strain on the local power supply caused by increased usage of electric heating. Despite this however, residents on some streets in Stannington began to report intermittent power outages throughout the day. Electric car owners were advised to use public charging points rather than those at their own homes.

The local authority, Sheffield City Council, officially declared a major incident on 7 December, with thousands of properties still without a gas supply and temperatures forecast to drop below freezing for prolonged periods in the coming days. Only around a quarter of affected properties had had their gas supplies reconnected at the time that the major incident was declared, according to Cadent Gas, as their engineers were struggling to pump the large quantities of water out of the complex local gas network; engineers and equipment were shipped in from across the country to assist in draining the network.

According to Cadent Gas, around three-quarters of affected properties had been reconnected to the gas network by 10 December. Considerable difficulties remained in draining water from the gas network in the Hillsborough and Malin Bridge areas, where hundreds of homes still remained without gas.

== Response ==
Refuge spaces were opened officially by the local authorities and unofficially by local businesses, providing warm spaces, hot food and drinks to affected residents. The primary official refuge was opened at Lomas Hall, a church hall on Church Street in Stannington, where residents were issued with portable electric heaters and electric hotplates for cooking. The Peacock Inn pub on Stannington Road opened to provide residents with food and hot drinks, while the nearby Crown & Glove pub on Uppergate Road opened to provide showering facilities.

Schools in the affected areas remained open, despite the interruption to their gas supplies; individual classrooms were heated using portable electric heaters, and Nook Lane Junior School advised parents to send children to school wearing additional warm clothing and with a packed lunch due to the unavailability of their kitchen facilities.

The Liberal Democrat councillor for the Stannington ward, Penny Baker, praised local residents for showing resilience and "community spirit" by coming together in the face of the crisis. Terry Fox, the leader of Sheffield City Council, declared a major incident on 7 December, stating that it would allow the local authorities to "better co-ordinate the overall response" to the crisis.

Olivia Blake, the Labour Member of Parliament for the Sheffield Hallam constituency in which Stannington is located, raised the gas supply outage during a debate in the House of Commons on 7 December, asking for direct government assistance and emergency funding.

== Aftermath ==
Yorkshire Water issued an apology to affected customers on 6 December, stating that they "understood how difficult it was" for affected residents. The water company was criticised for their part in causing the crisis, although a spokesperson maintained that the affected water main had previously been in a good condition and had not suffered any problems in more than a decade. Cadent Gas initially announced that residents would be compensated for any extra electricity usage caused by increased usage of portable electric heaters and other devices, before confirming that affected residents would receive double the usual rate of compensation for a gas outage, totalling £910 for a seven-day outage (or £1,470 for a commercial property).

Angry local residents interrupted a news conference being held by Yorkshire Water director Neil Dewis in Stannington on 9 December, heckling him and accusing the company of not taking the situation seriously. Residents claimed that there had been up to ten recent burst water mains in the Stannington area prior to the major incident, accusing Yorkshire Water of providing inadequate maintenance. In contrast, efforts by Cadent Gas and Northern Powergrid to deal with the crisis were praised by local residents.

Cadent appointed Aspect Maintenance from London as major contractor to replace hundreds of damaged gas appliances by 45 Engineers working 12 hours each day 7 days a week for 4 months.
