= 811 Main =

Skyscraper in Houston, Texas

811 Main (formerly BG Group Place)
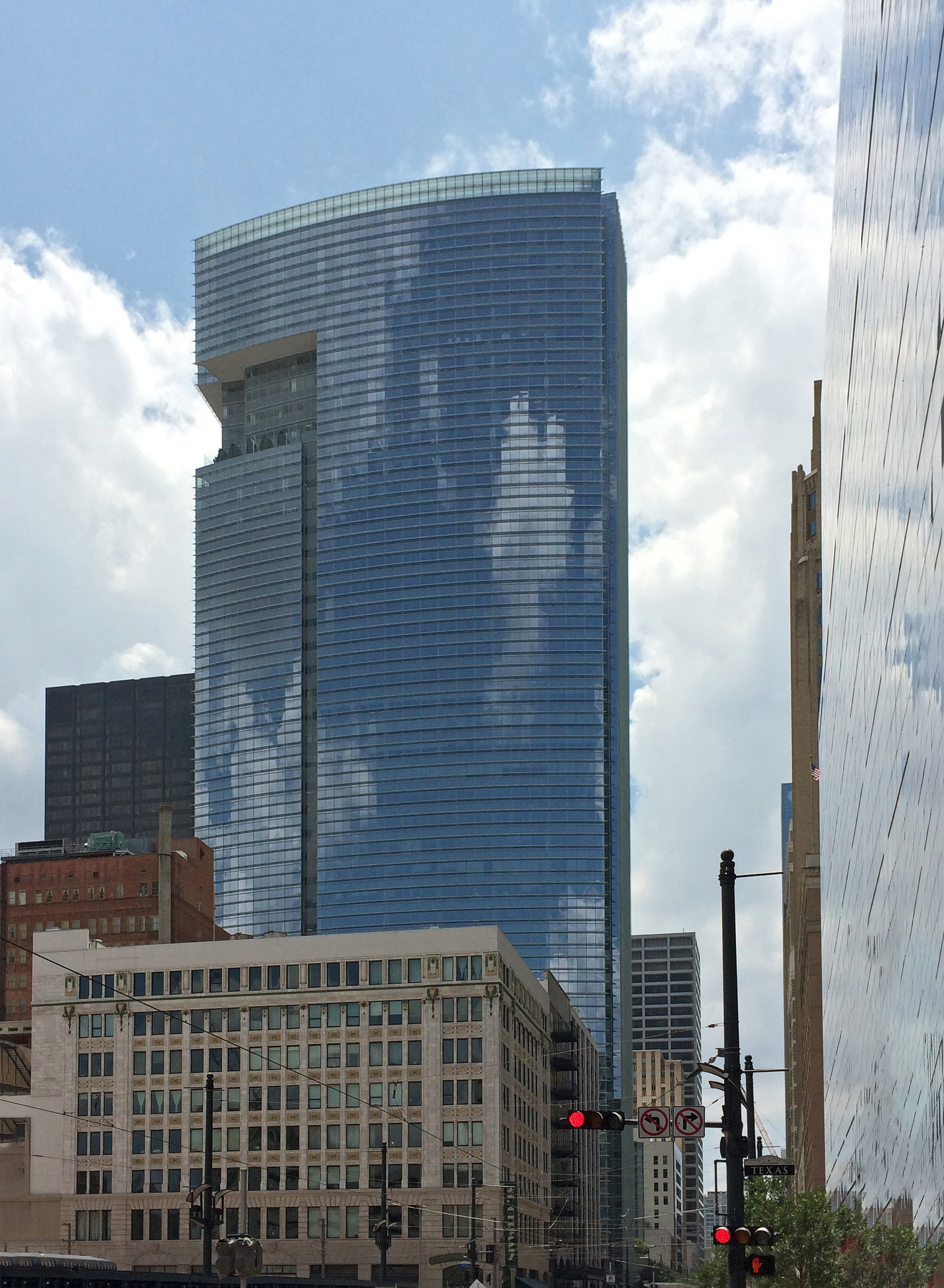
- BG Group Place May 2011
- Interactive map of the 811 Main (formerly BG Group Place) area

General information
- Status: Completed
- Type: Office
- Location: 811 Main Street, Downtown Houston, Texas
- Coordinates: 29.7578°N 95.3636°W
- Construction started: 2008
- Completed: Feb 2011
- Owner: Invesco

Height
- Roof: 631 ft (192 m)

Technical details
- Floor count: 46 Total
- Floor area: 1,262,865 sq ft (117,324.0 m^{2})
- Lifts/elevators: 18 in building, 3 in garage.

Design and construction
- Architects: Pickard Chilton & Kendall/Heaton Associates
- Developer: Hines
- Main contractor: Harvey Builders

811 Main (formerly BG Group Place and MainPlace) is a 630 ft (192 m) tall skyscraper in Downtown Houston, Texas. It was completed in February 2011 and has 46 floors. It is LEED Platinum Certified. When it was completed, BG Group Place became the 15th tallest building in Houston and features a skygarden on the 39th floor. It is the tallest building built in Houston in 23 years, after the Heritage Plaza was completed in 1987. The naming was done when BG Group Plc became an anchor tenant and leased 164,000sq ft of space.
The primary monument & all core signage for the facility was built by Ad Display Sign Systems.
Current major tenants include:

- Crestwood Midstream Partners
- KPMG
- Baker Hostetler
- Latham & Watkins
- Quorum
- Citi
- Kayne Anderson
- Reed Smith

== Environmental features ==
Features included in the building is a 39th-floor skygarden and a fully gardened top floor of the parking garage, that soaks up rainwater. Water that condenses in the building's air-conditioning system is used to irrigate the plants.

Glass fins that act as sunshades reduce the building's need for air-conditioning. The 10-foot ceilings (a foot higher than the modern standard) allow in more sunlight, cutting the need for electric lights.

== Layout ==
Each floor is on average 27,000 square feet (2,500 m^{2}) and can hold up to 8 full corner offices.

- Basement Floor 2: Parking
- Basement Floor 1: Parking, access to Downtown Houston tunnel system, and a small area for retail space.
- 1st Floor: Lobby, 1 large and 1 small retail space area, as well as reserved and unreserved parking. Access to the Downtown Houston tunnel system will also be available via an escalator to Basement Floor 1. The 30-foot (9.1 m) high ceilings will extend through Floor 2 and half of Floor 3.
- Floors 2-10: Parking
- Floor 11: Garage rooftop garden and premium office space
- Floors 12-20: Low rise office space
- Floor 21: Low to mid transfer
- Floors 22-33: Mid rise office space
- Floor 34: Mid to high transfer
- Floors 35 and 36: High rise office space
- Floors 37 and 38: Premium loft office space
- Floors 39-43: Sky Garden and premium office space (not open to the public)
- Floors 44-46: High rise office space
- Floor 47: Mechanical Area

== See also ==
- List of tallest buildings in Houston
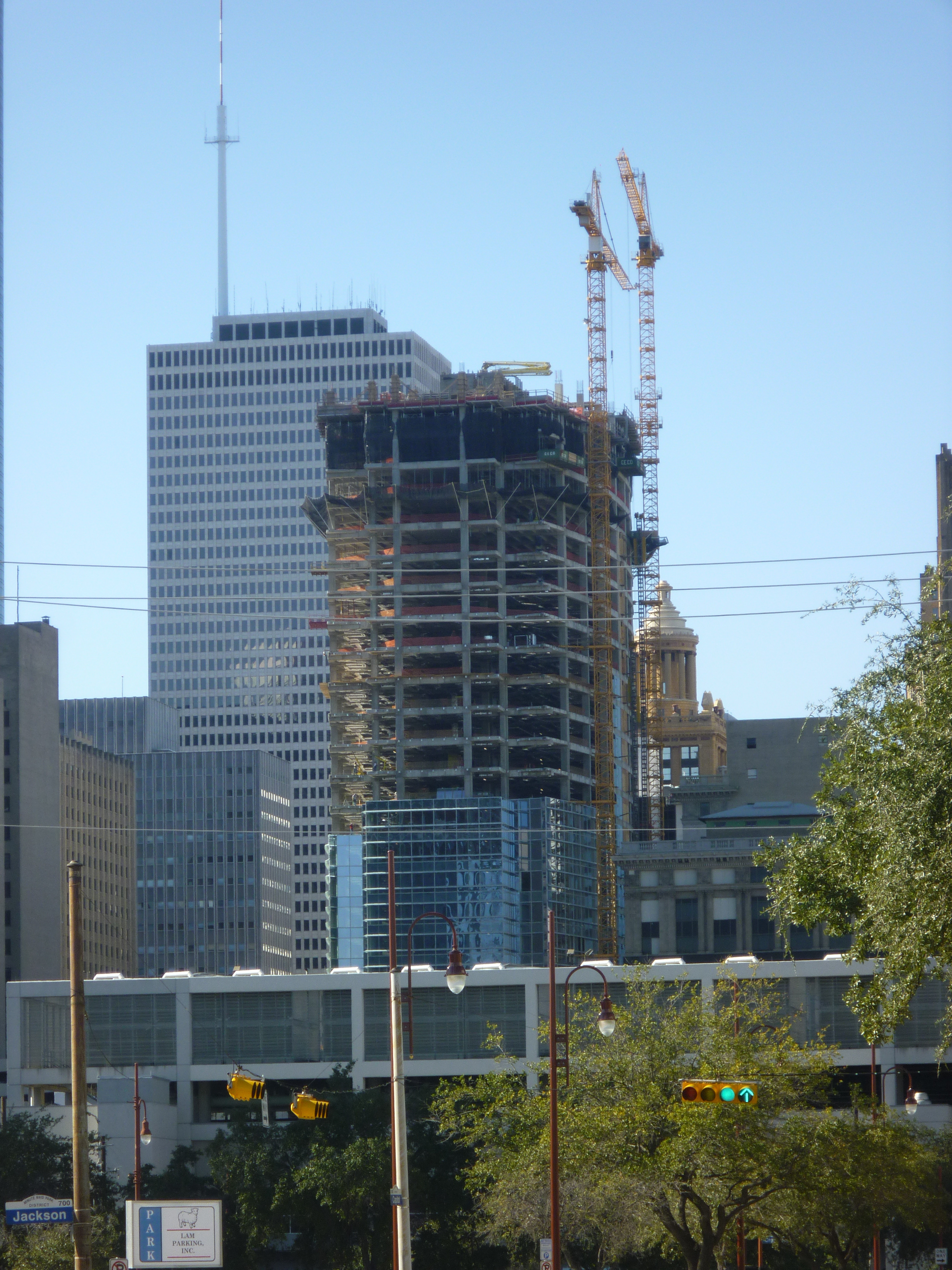
At the halfway point

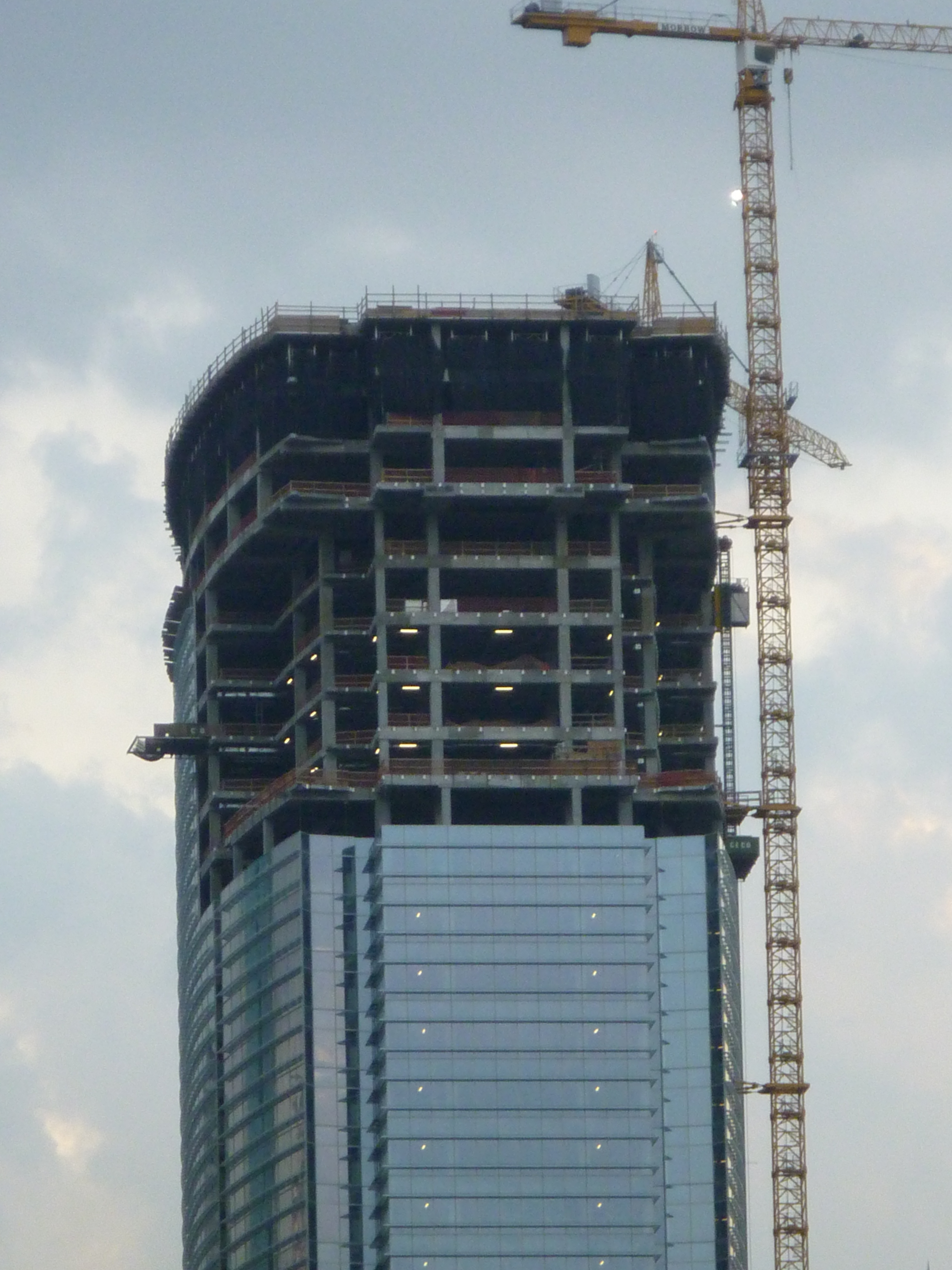
topped out

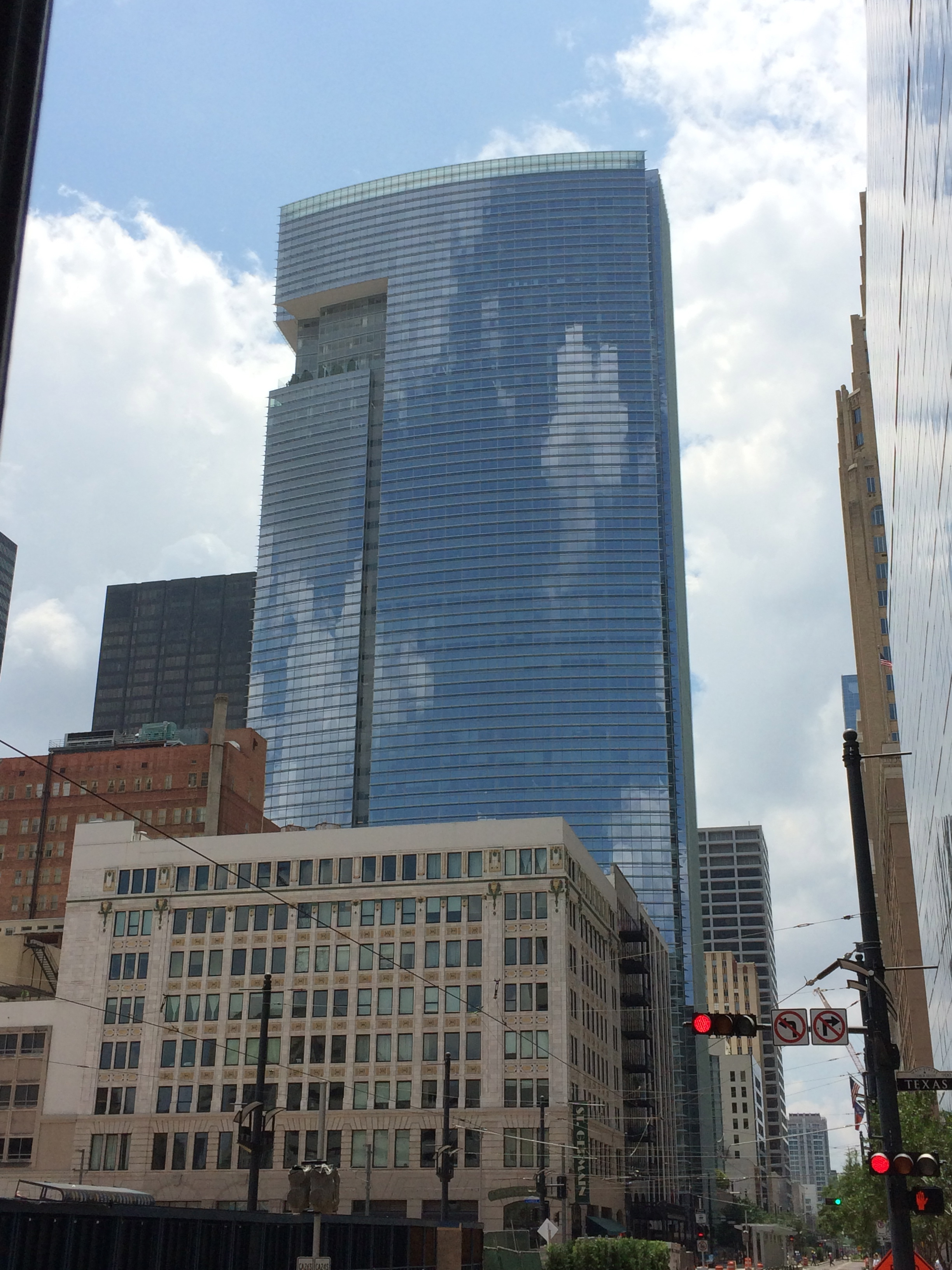
Viewed from Main Street

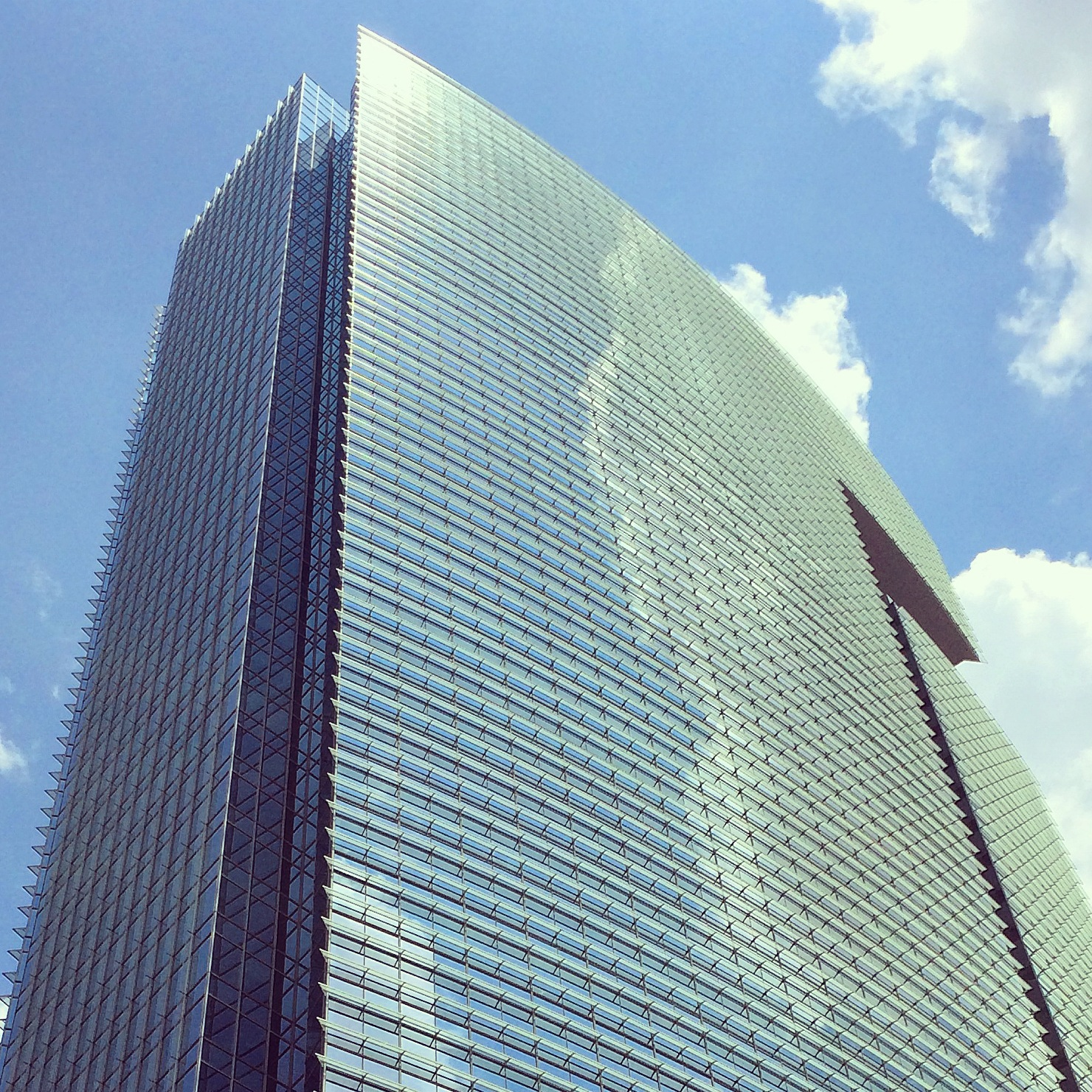
Viewed from Main Street, close-up
