= Andrew Gould (businessman) =

British businessman (born 1946)

- Born: 17 December 1946 (age 79); United Kingdom
- Education: University of Wales, Cardiff University of leeds.
- Occupations: Partner at CSL Capital Management and Member of the Board at Saudi Aramco

Andrew Frederick James Gould (born 17 December 1946) is a British businessman, the former chairman and CEO of Schlumberger.

== Education ==
Gould received his degree in Economic History from the University of Wales, Cardiff.

== Career ==
=== Early career ===
Gould started his career at Ernst & Young.

=== Schlumberger ===
In 1975, he joined the international oilfield services company Schlumberger in the company's Internal Audit department in Paris. In a series of earlier assignments, he was treasurer of Schlumberger Limited, and president of Sedco Forex, Wireline & Testing, and Oilfield Services Products, and executive vice president, Schlumberger Oilfield Services. Gould served as the CEO of Schlumberger from February 2003 to August 2011. Gould retired from his role of chief executive officer on 1 August 2011 and served as chairman until the company's annual shareholder meeting in April 2012.

=== Post-Schlumberger Career ===
Following his retirement from Schlumberger Ltd., Gould was serving as non-executive chairman of the British oil company BG Group until their merger with Shell in 2015.

Until May 2012, Gould was a member of the Board and Lead Independent Director of Rio Tinto plc. and Rio Tinto Ltd. and led their remuneration committee.

As of 2023, he is the chairman of the advisory board of Paris-based energy research start-up, Kayrros ., a Board member of the Saudi Arabian national oil company Saudi Aramco and a partner of the venture capital firm CSL Capital Management. He also serves as a member of the Board of Trustees of The King Abdullah University of Science and Technology in Jeddah, Saudi Arabia.

=== Honors and awards ===
In 2014, the Society of Petroleum Engineers (SPE) awarded Gould the Charles F. Rand Memorial Gold Medal.

Gould holds an honorary Doctorate in Engineering from the Colorado School of Mines and is an honorary Fellow of Cardiff University.
