= Iracema oil field =

Brazilian offshore oil field

- Location of the field in the Santos Basin
- Country: Brazil
- Region: Santos Basin
- Block: BM-S-11
- Offshore/onshore: Offshore
- Coordinates: 24°15′50″S 43°04′15″W
- Operator: Petrobras
- Partners: BG Group (25%), Galp Energia (10%)

Field history
- Discovery: 2008
- Start of development: 2009

Production
- Current production of oil: 50,000 barrels per day (~2.5×10^{6} t/a)(anticipated)
- Producing formations: Guaratiba Group

Iracema is an oil field located in the Santos Basin, 250 km (160 mi) off the coast of Rio de Janeiro, Brazil, 33 km (21 mi) northwest of the giant Tupi oil field. Iracema is the third well drilled in the BM-S-11 block and could be an extension of ultra deep Tupi oil field. The field was previously called Cernambi.

== Etymology ==
The field was named in honor of the Guarani Iracema figure from Brazilian mythology.

== History ==
Iracema's first well was drilled to a depth of 5,000 m (16,000 ft) and was completed in September 2009. Two drill stem tests were done over two zones with production reaching 10,500 bbl (1,670 m^{3}) per day and 17 million cubic feet (480,000 m^{3}) per day of gas . The oil produced at Iracema is 32° API. The partners expect the field will be producing up to 50,000 bbl/d (7,900 m^{3}/d).

== Ownership ==
BM-S-11 block which contains Iracema oil field is operated by Petrobras with controlling 65% of the stake while BG Group holds a 25% and Galp Energia holds 10% of the share.

== Reservoir ==
The Iracema field lies at a depth of 2,210 m (7,250 ft) and produces from the pre-salt Guaratiba Group. The depth, thickness of the salt and drastic changes in temperatures make the process of oil extraction particularly difficult which make the project financially challenging. Petrobras announced it would invite international oil companies to bid for concessions in the region.

== See also ==
- Campos Basin
- Pre-salt layer
- Tupi oil field
- Iara oil field
