= Sapinhoá oil field =

Brazilian offshore oil field

- Location of the field in the Santos Basin
- Country: Brazil
- Region: Santos Basin
- Block: BM-S-9
- Offshore/onshore: Offshore
- Coordinates: 25°17′50″S 43°53′25″W
- Operator: Petrobras
- Partners: BG Group (30%), Repsol-Sinopec (25%)

Field history
- Discovery: June 2008
- Start of development: 2009
- Start of production: Jan 2013

Production
- Estimated oil in place: 1,200−2,000 million barrels (~−270,000,000 t)
- Producing formations: Guaratiba Group

The Sapinhoá oil field is an oil field located in the southern Brazilian Santos Basin, 310 kilometres (190 mi) off the coast of Rio de Janeiro in a water depth of 7,065 feet (2,153 m). It was discovered in 2008 and originally named Guará field, under development by Petrobras. The oil field is operated by Petrobras and owned by Petrobras (45%) Repsol Sinopec Brazil (25%) and BG Group (30%). The total proven reserves of the Sapinhoá oil field range from 1,100–2,000 million barrels (170×10^{6}–320×10^{6} m^{3}).

== Etymology ==
The name Sapinhoá is derived from the Tupi language and refers to a marine mollusc.

== Reservoir ==
The field produces light oil and natural gas from the pre-salt Guaratiba Group reservoir rocks.
