= Frank Chapman (businessman) =

British businessman

Sir Frank Chapman
- Born: Frank Joseph Chapman; 17 June 1953 (age 73); West Ham, Essex
- Education: Newham College of Further Education; Queen Mary College, London
- Occupation: Businessman
- Years active: 1974–present
- Title: Chief Executive of BG Group plc
- Term: 2000–2012
- Successor: Chris Finlayson (from 1 January 2013)

Sir Frank Joseph Chapman (born 17 June 1953) is a British businessman who was Chief Executive of BG Group, the oil and gas exploration company.

== Early life ==
Chapman grew up in Custom House, Newham. His father was a truck driver. He attended East Ham Technical College (now called Newham College of Further Education), in East Ham, where he obtained an OND in 1971 and later an HND whilst working for a local company, Matthew Hawke. From Queen Mary College, also in east London, he obtained a BSc in Mechanical Engineering in 1974.

== Career ==
He worked for BP from 1974 to 1978 initially at their research centre at Sunbury-on-Thames, then Shell from 1978 to 1996. He joined British Gas as managing director of Exploration and Production on 11 November 1996, which became BG International on 17 February 1997. In October 2000, he became Chief Executive of BG Group when Transco was de-merged from BG International on 23 October 2000.

Chapman's remuneration from BG Group in 2008 consisted of £1,081,588 base salary and a £1,944,000 bonus.

Chapman was knighted in the 2011 Birthday Honours for services to the oil and gas industries.

Chapman stood down at the end of 2012 after 12 years as CEO and was replaced by Chris Finlayson. Chapman continued as an advisor to BG Group until he retired in June 2013.

In July 2020, Chapman joined the board of Zap Energy, a Seattle-based company developing a compact fusion reactor without the use of magnetic coils.
