= Marlim =

Oil field in Campos Basin, Brazil

Marlim is a giant Brazilian oil field located in the north-eastern part of the Campos Basin, about 110 km offshore Rio de Janeiro, in water depths ranging from 650 to 1,050 m. Marlim means marlin, in Portuguese.

Marlim was originally discovered by well in February 1985. The 75 m column was predominantly unconsolidated sandstone, with a permeability as high as two darcies. The discovery also showed high-gravity oil (17-21 degree API). At the time of discovery, the Marlim reservoir had an oil-in-place volume of about 9 billion barrels and an expectated 1.7 billion barrels of oil in total reserves.

== Geology ==
The Marlim field consists of a single Oligocene producing horizon of sandstone turbidites, with an area of 152 km^{2}. Reflection seismology in 1972 disclosed a faulted anticline and seismic amplitude bright spot, which was drilled by wildcat 1-RJS-219A in 1985 and discovered oil. The stratigraphy of the Campos Basin starts with the Lower Cretaceous Lago Feia Formation a source rock, followed by the Albian Macae Formation consisting of shallow water carbonates overlain by late Albian shales, marls, calcilutites, and turbidite sandstones. From this formation through most of the Cenozoic, the Campos Formation was deposited, consisting of deep water turbiditic sandstones and shales, the main producers in the Albacora and Marlim fields. Finally, the basin was filled by the Ubatuba Formation, consisting of slope and shelf deposits.
