= Cachalote =

Offshore oil field in Brazil

Cachalote is an offshore oil field located in Brazil. The field was discovered in November 2002 and is estimated to contain 350,000,000 barrels (56,000,000 m3) of heavy crude oil, with a gravity of 20°. The oil field is operated by the Brazilian state-owned oil company, Petrobras.

Plans to develop the oil field were delayed due to the 2008 financial crisis. In June 2008, SBM Offshore secured a letter of intent from Petrobras for the construction of a floating, production, storage, and offloading (FPSO) vessel to be used on the Cachalote field. The FPSO, named Capixaba, was scheduled to begin production on the field in 2010. However, the FPSO ultimately operated on a different field, and production on Cachalote has yet to resume.

As of 2021, the status of the Cachalote field remains unclear. Petrobras has faced significant financial challenges in recent years, including a corruption scandal and declining oil prices. These factors, along with increasing competition in the global oil market and regulatory hurdles, may impact the company's ability to develop and produce from its existing reserves, including the Cachalote field.
