= BG Group =

Former British multinational oil and gas company

BG Group plc
- Type: Public
- Traded as: LSE: BG.L
- Industry: Oil and gas
- Founded: 1997; 29 years ago (Demerger of Centrica); 2000 (Demerger of Lattice Group from BG Group)
- Defunct: 15 February 2016
- Fate: Acquired by Royal Dutch Shell
- Successor: Royal Dutch Shell (now Shell plc)
- Headquarters: Reading, Berkshire, England
- Products: Crude oil; natural gas; petrochemicals
- Revenue: US$19.289 billion (2014)
- Operating income: US$6.155 billion (2014)
- Net income: US$(1.044) billion (2014)
- Number of employees: 5,200 (2015)

BG Group plc was a British multinational oil and gas company headquartered in Reading, Berkshire, England. On 8 April 2015, Royal Dutch Shell announced that it had reached an agreement to acquire BG Group for $70 billion, subject to regulatory and shareholder agreement. The sale was completed on 15 February 2016. Prior to the takeover, BG Group was listed on the London Stock Exchange (BG.L) and was a constituent of the FTSE 100 Index. In the 2015 Forbes Global 2000, BG Group was ranked as the 583rd largest public company in the world.

Prior to its acquisition by Shell, BG Group had operations in 25 countries across six continents and produced around 680,000 barrels of oil equivalent per day. It had a major liquefied natural gas (LNG) business and was the largest supplier of LNG to the United States. As at 31 December 2009, it had total proven commercial reserves of 2.6 billion barrels (410,000,000 m^{3}) of oil equivalent.

== History ==
=== Origins ===
The company was created in 1997 when British Gas plc divested Centrica and became BG plc, which was reorganised in 1999 as BG Group plc.

=== 2000 to 2016 ===
On 23 October 2000, a further demerger separated the company into Lattice Group and BG Group. Lattice took ownership of Transco (the gas transporter for the UK), Advantica (gas engineering and consultancy specialist) along with the property and transport companies and BG Group took ownership of gas fields and other assets. In 2002, Lattice merged with National Grid Company to become National Grid Transco which was renamed National Grid in 2005.

In September 2007, BG Group delisted its ADRs from the New York Stock Exchange. Instead its shares began trading on the US over-the-counter market.

In June 2008, BG Group made a US$13.1 billion bid to acquire Origin Energy, Australia's largest coal-seam gas producer, but were outmanoeuvred by ConocoPhillips, who offered to invest US$9.1 billion in a joint venture with Origin. However, in October 2008, BG Group bought Queensland Curtis LNG for US$3.4bn in order to operate in Asia's liquefied natural gas market, and on 1 November 2010, BG Group announced plans to invest £9.3bn on the world's first project to liquefy and ship gas produced from coal deposits – the first in a series of "coal seam methane" projects in the region of eastern Australia; by late 2014, this was sending gas produced from coal deposits by pipeline to a terminal in Gladstone on the east coast. In October 2011, BG Group signed a US$8 billion deal with Cheniere Energy to export liquefied natural gas from the United States.

In October 2012, BG sold its 65% majority stake in Gujarat Gas Company for $470 million to the state-run Gujarat State Petroleum Corporation. In January 2014, BG Group announced the initial drilling of an oil exploration well offshore in Kenya.

In April 2015, Royal Dutch Shell announced that it had reached an agreement to acquire BG Group for $70 billion, subject to regulatory and shareholder agreement. The deal gave BG shareholders 19% of the combined group, and gave Shell extensive access to BG's LNG assets, accelerating its global LNG and deep water strategy. Finalisation of the BG acquisition by Royal Dutch Shell was completed on 15 February 2016.

== Operations ==
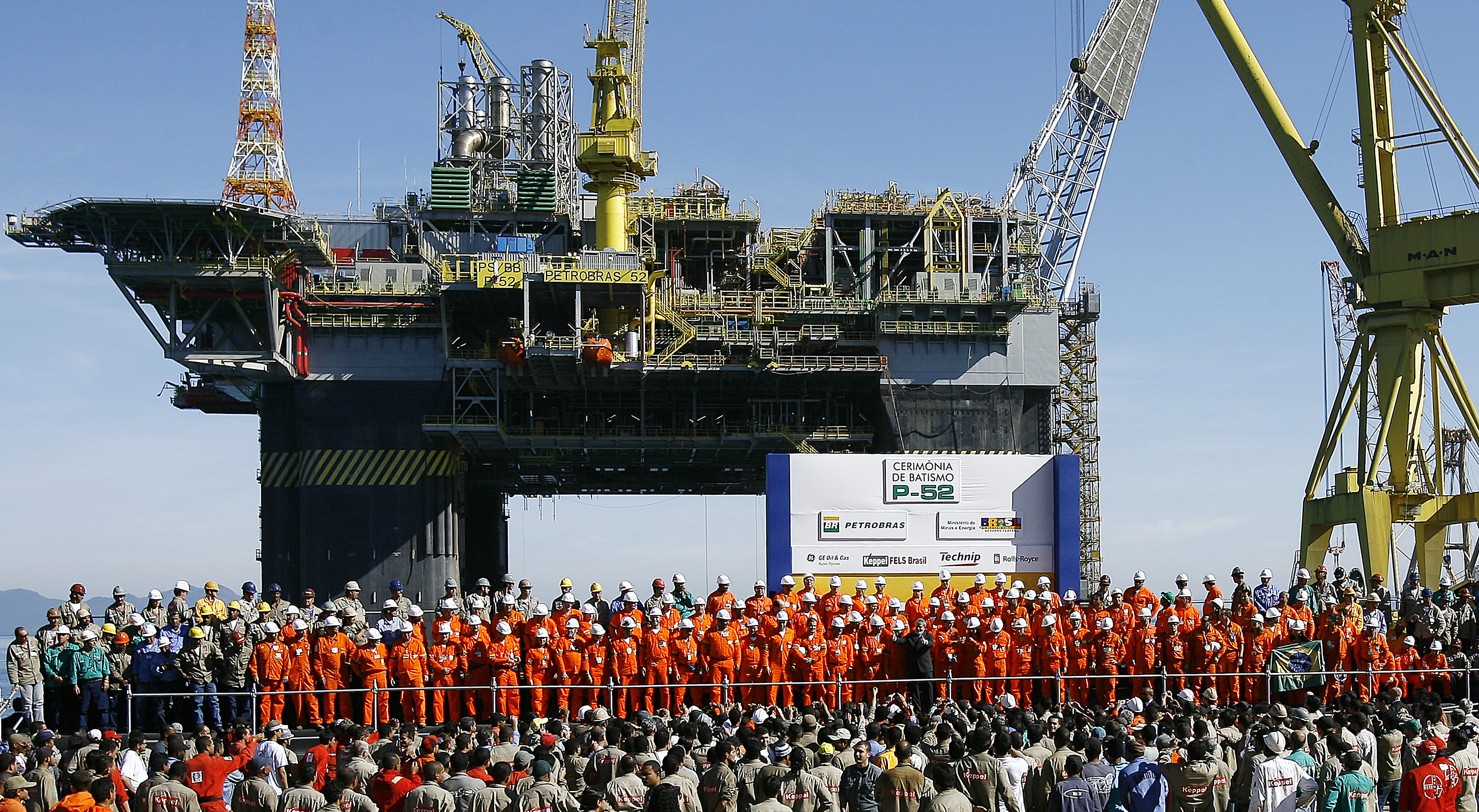
Launch ceremony for oil platform P-52, which operates in the Campos Basin.

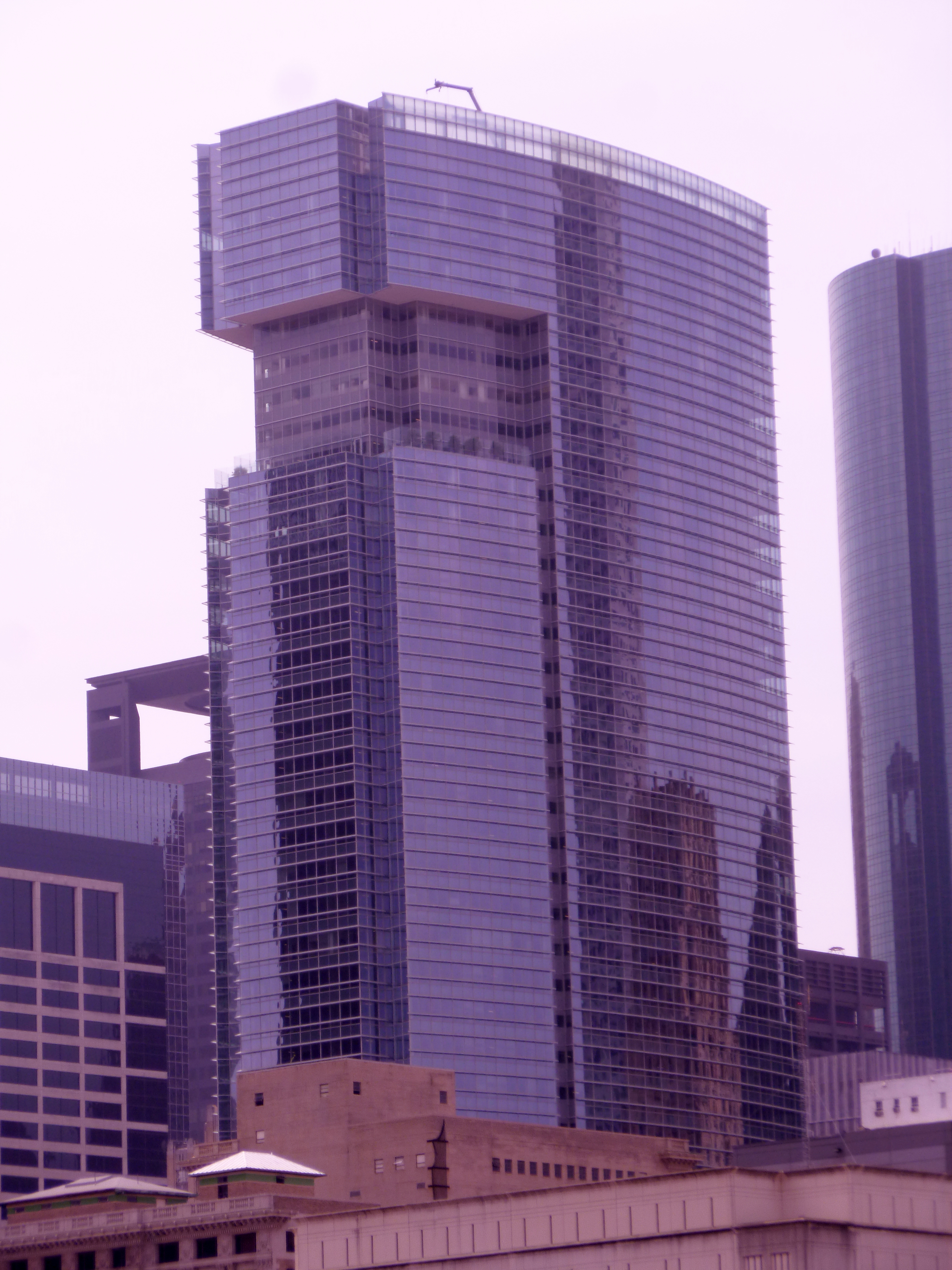
BG Group Place in Houston, United States, the former North American headquarters of BG Group.

BG Group's main business was the exploration and extraction of natural gas and oil and the production of liquefied natural gas. It sold these products to wholesale customers such as retail gas suppliers and electricity generating companies. It also owned some gas pipelines and was involved in some power generation projects. It was active around the world, with only a minority of its business being in the UK. BG Group was a multinational company with operations in 27 countries. Key areas for the company included:

- Australia
  - QGC, coal seam gas upstream plays in Queensland's Surat and Bowen basin, and Curtis Island based LNG plant
- Brazil
  - Interests in the Tupi, Iara, Guara, and Iracema fields in the Santos Basin off the coast of southeastern Brazil
- Egypt
  - Operates the Rosetta and West Delta Deep Marine gas fields, LNG export
- India
  - Interest in the Panna-Mukta and Tapti fields, and Mahanagar Gas Limited (a city gas distribution company operating in Mumbai).
- Kazakhstan
  - Interest in the Karachaganak gas field
- Norway
  - Exploration licences with several discoveries
- Thailand
  - Interest in the Bongkot gas field
- Trinidad and Tobago
  - NCMA gas fields, Dolphin gas field, LNG export
- Tunisia
  - Operates the Miskar and Hasdrubal gas fields
- UK
  - Interests in several oil and gas fields in the UK continental shelf, including operating the Armada, Everest, and Lomond gas fields and the Blake oil field, Interest in the Dragon LNG import terminal
- US
  - Interest in LNG terminals, shale gas joint venture operation in the Haynesville and Marcellus plays, and Houston.

== Senior management ==
Sir Frank Chapman was appointed Chief Executive of the BG Group in October 2000. His remuneration for this role in 2008 consisted of £1,081,588 base salary and a £1,944,000 bonus.

Chapman stood down at the end of 2012 after 12 years as CEO, and was replaced by Chris Finlayson, previously managing director for 'BG Advance', a business function within the Group. Chapman continued as an advisor to BG Group until he retired in June 2013. Finlayson lost the confidence of the Board in 2014 and resigned, replaced by Andrew Gould.

On 15 October 2014, the company announced that Helge Lund, former CEO of Statoil, would become CEO. Lund left the company on 15 February 2016, following successful completion of the Shell acquisition and was replaced by a Shell appointed transition CEO.

== Controversies ==
RepRisk listed the BG Group as seventh in its top ten of "Most Environmentally and Socially Controversial Companies of 2010". Reasons for the company's inclusion are as follows.

- The BG Group were associated with deep-sea drilling plans in the Sicilian Strait. Karachaganak Petroleum Operating (KPO) consortium that includes BG was reportedly fined US$21 million for environmental violations at the onshore Karachaganak Oil and Gas Field.
- BG subsidiary Queensland Gas Company's Queensland Curtis LNG Project had caused controversy in Australia.
- The exploitation of the Tarija natural gas reserves in Bolivia where another BG subsidiary operated.
- The report also criticized the remuneration given to its chief executive who had received GBP 28 million in cash, shares and pension contributions in 2009.
