= Lattice Group =

Former British gas transmission business

Lattice Group plc
- Industry: Gas transmission
- Founded: 2000
- Defunct: 2002
- Fate: Merged with National Grid plc
- Successor: National Grid plc
- Headquarters: London, England, UK
- Key people: Sir John Parker (Chairman); Philip Nolan (CEO)
- Number of employees: 16,000

Lattice Group plc was a leading British gas transmission business. It was listed on the London Stock Exchange and was a constituent of the FTSE 100 Index.

== History ==
The Company was established in 2000 when BG Group demerged its UK gas transmission business, formerly known as Transco, and named it Lattice Group.

In October 2002 Lattice Group merged with National Grid plc to form National Grid Transco.

In July 2005 National Grid Transco was renamed National Grid plc to provide 'a unifying identity across its operations'.

== Operations ==
As well as the UK gas transmission network, Lattice Group owned a telecoms business known as 186k.
