= Iara Oil Field =

Brazilian offshore oil field

Iara oil field
- Location of the field in the Santos Basin
- Country: Brazil
- Region: Santos Basin
- Block: BM-S-11
- Offshore/onshore: Offshore
- Coordinates: 25°40′50″S 41°40′41″W
- Operator: Petrobras
- Partners: BG Group (25%), Galp Energia (10%)

Field history
- Discovery: 2008
- Start of production: 2017 (planned)

Production
- Estimated oil in place: 3,000−4,000 million barrels (~−550,000,000 t)
- Producing formations: Guaratiba Group

Iara oil field is a large ultra-deepwater pre-salt oil field located in the Santos Basin, 230 km (140 mi) off the coast of Rio de Janeiro, Brazil, north of Tupi oil field. It covers an area of nearly 300 km^{2} (120 mi^{2}).

== Etymology ==
The field was named in honor of the Iara figure from Brazilian mythology.

== History ==
The field was discovered on 7 August 2008 with an encounter of light oil which measured between 26 and 30° API. The well depth measured at 6,080 m (19,950 ft). The field is believed to hold approximately 3-4 billion barrels of light oil and natural gas. This amount equals to the country internal demand of 5 years. BG Group announced that the discovery was three times larger than initially expected. Due to their formations, fields in Santos Basin are very difficult and costly to exploit.

== Ownership ==
BM-S-11 block, which contains Iara oil field, is operated by Petrobras with controlling 65% of the stake while BG Group holds a 25% and Galp Energia holds 10% of the share. As per Bear Stearns estimates, the value of oil in the block ranges from $25 billion to $60 billion. BM-S-11 also includes Tupi Sul, Tupi and Iracema fields.

== Reservoir ==
The reservoir of Iara oil field is the pre-salt Guaratiba Group. The field lies at a water depth of 6,080 ft (1,850 m) in an area which covers 800 kilometres (500 mi) along Brazil's coast from Espírito Santo to Santa Catarina states. It is yet unconfirmed whether Iara is the extension of Tupi oil field since there are large unexplored areas between the two fields. According to Julio Bueno, economic policy secretary at Rio de Janeiro state, the whole area may contain as much as 70 billion barrels of crude oil which would require an estimated $600 billion to develop the fields.

== See also ==
- Campos Basin
- Tupi oil field
- Iracema oil field
