= Tupi oil field =

Brazilian offshore oil field

Tupi
- Location within Brazil
- Country: Brazil
- Region: Latin America
- Location/block: BM S 11
- Offshore/onshore: Offshore
- Coordinates: 25°30′0″S 43°30′0″W
- Operator: Petrobras
- Partners: BG Group, Galp Energia

Field history
- Discovery: 2006

Production
- Current production of oil: 794,000 barrels per day (~3.96×10^{7} t/a)
- Year of current production of oil: 2025
- Recoverable oil: 7,500 million barrels (~10.0×10^{8} t)
- Producing formations: Barremian, Lower Aptian Guaratiba Formation

The Tupi oil field (reverted from Lula oil field) is a large oil field located in the Santos Basin, 250 kilometres (160 mi) off the coast of Rio de Janeiro, Brazil. The field was originally nicknamed in honor of the Tupi people and later named after the mollusc, however it was also ambiguously similar to the name of former Brazilian president Luiz Inácio Lula da Silva. It is considered to be the Western Hemisphere's largest oil discovery of the last 30 years.

== History ==
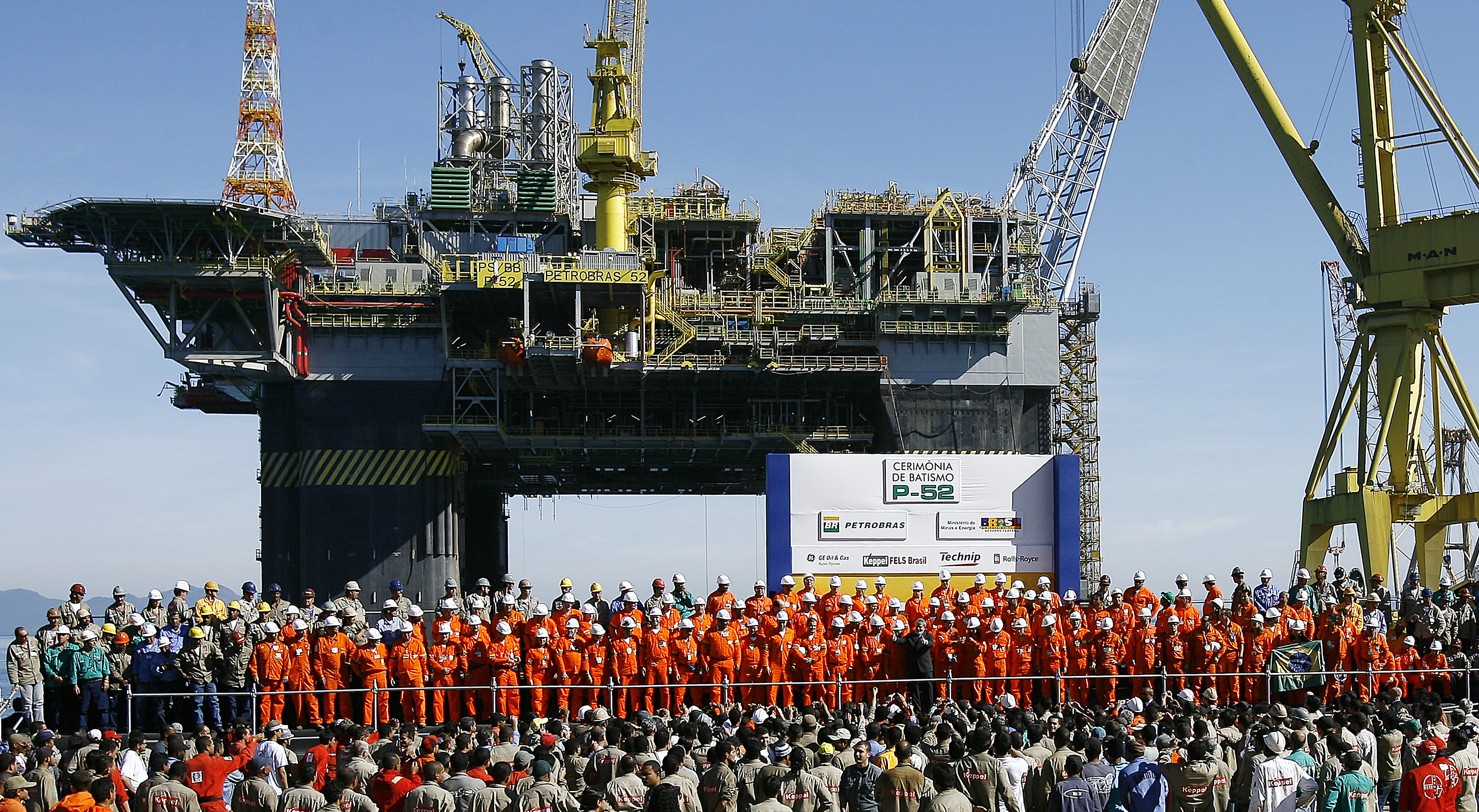
Brazilian President Lula da Silva on the launch of the P-52 oil Platform

The Tupi field was discovered in October 2006 by Petrobras. The former president of Brazil, Luiz Inácio Lula da Silva called the field second independence for Brazil. The field was originally named Tupi but in 2010 it was renamed Lula. The name 'Lula' means squid in Portuguese but also refers to Luiz Inácio Lula da Silva. The upper estimate of 8 billion barrels (1.3 billion cubic metres) of recoverable oil would be enough to meet the total global demand for crude oil for about three months at the 2008 global extraction rate of around 85 million barrels per day (13,500,000 m^{3}/d).

In January 2008 Petrobras announced the discovery of the Jupiter field, a huge natural gas and condensate field which could equal the Tupi oil field in size. It lies 37 kilometres (23 mi) east of Tupi.

== Reservoir ==
The Tupi field is located in the geological formation known as the Brazilian pre-salt layer, which lies below 2,000 metres (6,600 ft) of water and then 5,000 metres (16,000 ft) of salt, sand and rocks. The Tupi accumulation, in block BM-S-11 of the Santos basin, contains at least 5 billion barrels (0.79 km^{3}) of recoverable oil which could increase Brazil's reserves by 62%. This would make it twice the size of the Roncador, previously Brazil's largest field. Tupi is a sub-salt discovery—held in rocks beneath a salt layer that, in places, reaches thicknesses of over 2,000 metres (6,600 ft). The crude oil is an intermediate or medium gravity oil of 28–30 °API, which corresponds to a specific gravity around 0.88. The Tupi crude oil is considered sweet, which means that the sulfur content is less than 0.7% sulfur by weight.

By 2008 estimates had pushed the total to greater than 30 billion barrels (4.8×10^{9} cubic metres) equivalent, though Petrobras had not confirmed the highest estimate. These estimates were put into severe doubt by impartial analysts.

== Ownership ==
Block BM-S-11, which contains the Tupi field, is operated by Petrobras with a 65% controlling stake while BG Group holds 25% and Galp Energia has the remaining 10% interest. According to Bear Stearns estimates, the value of the oil in the block ranges from $25 billion to $60 billion. BM-S-11 also includes Tupi Sul, Iara and Iracema fields.

== Production ==
On April 22, 2009, BW Offshore and Petrobras let up the first crude oil from test well at Tupi field. The celebration ceremony for the beginning of production was held aboard the BW Cidade de Sao Vicente floating production, storage and offloading vessel (FPSO) on May 1, 2009. The president was expected to visit, but did not show up. The first producing well was expected to provide output of 14,000 barrels per day (2,200 m^{3}/d) while the second well was expected to produce 15,000 barrels per day (2,400 m^{3}/d). By 2020, Petrobras expects to produce up to 500,000 barrels per day (79,000 m^{3}/d). Full field development may include up to 300 producing and injector wells, with total gross oil production reaching 1,000,000 barrels per day (160,000 m^{3}/d) and 1 billion cubic feet (28 million cubic metres) of gas. The drilling of the first 15 wells has cost $1 billion. It is estimated that the total field cost will come to $50–$100 billion owing to the complexity of the geological formation. Up to 12 FPSOs may be needed for full production at Tupi. The field produced 100,000 barrels a day (January 2013). The field produced 922,000 barrels per day (146,600 m^{3}/d) and 1.48 billion cubic feet (42 million cubic metres) of gas in 2021. The field was producing 764,000 barrels per day during the first eight months of 2024. Daily crude output returned to previous year’s level in August, reaching 830,000 bpd, following the end of a planned maintenance on a platform. The field produced 794,000 barrels of oil in June 2025 as per ANP Brazil report. In August 2025, Tupi field was overtaken by [Buzios Field] as the largest producing Brazilian oil field.

== See also ==
- Iara oil field
- Campos Basin
- Iracema Oil Field
