= Pre-salt layer =

Geological formations

The pre-salt layer was formed in restricted basins in the South Atlantic due to the break-up of Gondwana and arid climates

The pre-salt layer is a diachronous series of geological formations on the continental shelves of extensional basins formed after the break-up of Gondwana, characterized by the deposition of thick layers of evaporites, mostly salt. Some of the petroleum that was generated from sediments in the pre-salt layer has not migrated upward to the post-salt layers above due to salt domes. This is especially common off the coast of Africa and Brazil. Total pre-salt oil reserves are thought to be a significant fraction of the world's oil reserves. According to Brazilian oil and gas company Petrobras, the oil and natural gas reserves lie below an approximately 2,000 metres (6,600 ft) thick layer of salt, which in turn is beneath more than 2,000 metres (6,600 ft) of post-salt sediments in places, which in turn is under water depths between 2,000 and 3,000 metres (6,600 and 9,800 ft) in the South Atlantic. Because of this, drilling through the rock and salt to extract the pre-salt oil and gas is very expensive.

== Brazil ==

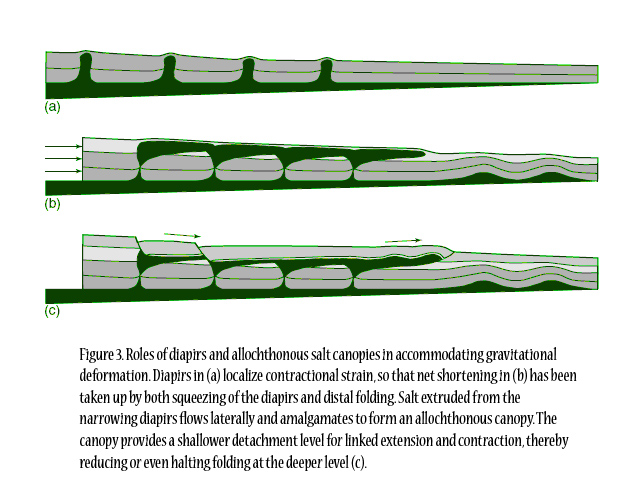
Schematic diagram showing pre-salt layers and halokinesis, the movement of salt over geologic time.

The oil reserves found in the pre-salt layer of the Brazilian coast are within the maritime area considered the exclusive economic zone of Brazil. They are reserves with oil considered of medium to high quality, according to the API scale. The set of pre-salt oil fields extends along the coast from the state of Espírito Santo in the north, as far as Santa Catarina in the south, where the ocean depths range from 1,000 to 2,000 meters, and is found between 4,000 and 6,000 meters deep in the subsoil, thus reaching up to 8,000 meters below sea level, including a salt layer ranging from 200 to 2,000 meters thick.

The current findings from Petrobras and other companies in the province of the pre-salt, located in the Brazilian continental shelf, implicate reserves of over 50 billion barrels of oil, a volume four times greater than the current national reserves, roughly 14 billion barrels.

In this province, there may be large oil and natural gas reserves located under salt layers that extend for 800 kilometers along the Brazilian coast – from the coast of Santa Catarina to the coast of Espírito Santo – and are up to 200 km wide.

Some estimates give the total area of the pre-salt as 122,000 km^{2}. Of this total, concessions have already been granted for 41,000 km^{2}, and 71,000 km^{2} have not yet been tendered.

Pre-salt oil is of good quality, although it is found in reserves that are in deep-sea areas and under thick layers of salt, requiring large-scale investment to extract it.

Since 2006, Petrobras has drilled 11 oil wells in the Santos Basin, near Rio de Janeiro state. All these oil wells have been successful. At the prospects of Tupi and Iara alone, which are located in the BM-S-11 block, Petrobras already estimates that there are 8 to 12 billion barrels of recoverable oil. This block alone can almost double the current Brazilian oil reserves.

== Angola ==
The first pre-salt discoveries in Angola were the Denden-1 well in Block 9 in 1983, operated by Cities Services at the time, and the Baleia-1A well on Block 20 in 1996, operated by Mobil (now ExxonMobil). Both blocks are now operated by the U.S.-based Cobalt International Energy. The Danish company Maersk Oil made the first recent pre-salt discovery in the Kwanza Basin in late 2011 with the Azul well on Block 23. Maersk continues to study the results of the well and plans to appraise it.

Cobalt International has had the most success with pre-salt exploration in Angola, making multiple pre-salt well discoveries in Blocks 20 and 21 (Cameia, Mavinga, Lontra, Bicuar, and Orca). In January 2011, Angola announced that it awarded 11 pre-salt offshore blocks in the Kwanza basin, following a closed licensing round in which a few selected International Oil Companies (IOCs) were invited. IOCs that were awarded blocks include Petrobras, Maersk Oil, Cobalt International, BP, Repsol, TotalEnergies, Eni, ConocoPhillips, and Statoil. Some of those companies have slowed their investments in Angola's pre-salt reserves, and some wells have been closed and abandoned. The combination of disappointing results and geological complexity, compounded by the low-oil-price environment, has resulted in reduced investment in Angola's pre-salt areas.
