= Campos Basin =

Coastal sedimentary basin of Brazil

- Bacia do Campos
- Location within Brazil
- Coordinates: 22°28′52″S 34°50′00″W
- Region: Southeast
- Country: Brazil
- States: Rio de Janeiro, Espírito Santo
- Cities: Campos dos Goytacazes and Macaé

Characteristics
- On/Offshore: Both, mostly offshore
- Boundaries: Vitória, Cabo Frio Highs, Serra do Mar
- Part of: Brazilian Atlantic margin
- Area: ~115,000 km^{2} (44,000 sq mi)

Hydrology
- Sea: South Atlantic

Geology
- Basin type: Passive margin on rift basin
- Plate: South American
- Orogeny: Break-up of Gondwana
- Age: Neocomian-recent
- Stratigraphy: Stratigraphy
- Fields: Marlim, Albacora-Leste, Barracuda, Roncador, Cachalote, Badejo

The Campos Basin is one of 12 coastal sedimentary basins of Brazil. It spans both onshore and offshore parts of the South Atlantic with the onshore part located near Rio de Janeiro. The basin originated in Neocomian stage of the Cretaceous period 145–130 million years ago during the breakup of Gondwana. It has a total area of about 115,000 square kilometres (44,000 sq mi), with the onshore portion small at only 500 square kilometres (190 sq mi).

== Etymology ==
The basin is named after the Campos dos Goytacazes city.

== Description ==
The Campos Basin is bound on the south by the Cabo Frio High, separating the basin from the Santos Basin and on the north by the Vitória High, forming the boundary with the Espírito Santo Basin. Campos Basin contains the Paraiba do Sul River delta.

=== Tectonic history ===
The break-up of Pangaea characterised the start of formation of the Santos Basin in the South Atlantic, forming at the same time the Kwanza Basin in Africa.

Schematic diagram of the formation of a passive margin on a rift basin

The South Atlantic margin developed on Archean stable cratons consisting of hard and resistant rocks and partly on the Neoproterozoic mobile belts composed of less resistant metamorphic rocks. The Precambrian basement of the Santos Basin is exposed as the Araçuaí Belt along the Brazilian coast, most notably in the inselbergs of Rio de Janeiro, of which Sugarloaf Mountain is the most iconic. The ancient rocks consist of a Neoproterozoic to Cambrian high-grade metamorphic core of granites and gneisses, formed during the collision of Gondwana in the Pan-African-Brasiliano orogeny. Basalts similar to the Paraná and Etendeka traps, exposed to the west in the Paraná Basin, have been found underlying the Santos Basin. The Tristan da Cunha hotspot, known as the Tristan hotspot, is considered the driver behind the formation of these flood basalts.

During the Early Cretaceous, the former continent Gondwana, as southern part of Pangea, starting to break-up, resulting in a sequence of rift basins bordering the present-day South Atlantic. The Pelotas-Namibia spreading commenced in the Hauterivian, around 133 million years ago and reached the Santos Basin to the north in the Barremian. Seafloor spreading continued northwards to the Campos Basin in the Early Albian, at approximately 112 Ma.

Five tectonic stages have been identified in the Brazilian basins:

1. Pre-rift stage – Jurassic to Valanginian
2. Syn-rift stage – Hauterivian to Late Barremian
3. Sag stage – Late Barremian to Late Aptian
4. Post-rift stage – Early to Middle Albian
5. Drift stage – Late Albian to Holocene

=== Stratigraphy ===
Oil reservoirs include formations deposited during the Aptian and pre-Aptian continental rift phase, of post-salt Albian-Cenomanian shallow-water marine carbonates and deepwater sandstones, and in turbidites of the open marine drift phase of Late Cretaceous and early Tertiary ages.

The Namorado Field "location was selected based on seismic interpretation of a structural high at the top of the Macaé Formation (Albian limestones)" at a depth of about 3 kilometres (9,800 ft), and the reservoirs are marine turbidite deposits transgressing over the Albian limestone shelf.

The stratigraphy starts with basalt flows dated at 120 Ma, overlain by the Lagoa Feia Group, consisting of the organic-rich lacustrine "green shales" followed by lacustrine limestones and continental sandstones and conglomerates, transitioning into marine sediments with evaporites, limestones, and limestone altered dolomites. The shallow marine limestones of the Macaé Formation follow, then the Namorado turbidite sandstones, and finally the Campos Formation, consisting of the turbidite sandstone Carapebus Member and the prograding slope and shelf Ubatuba Formation.

== Exploration ==
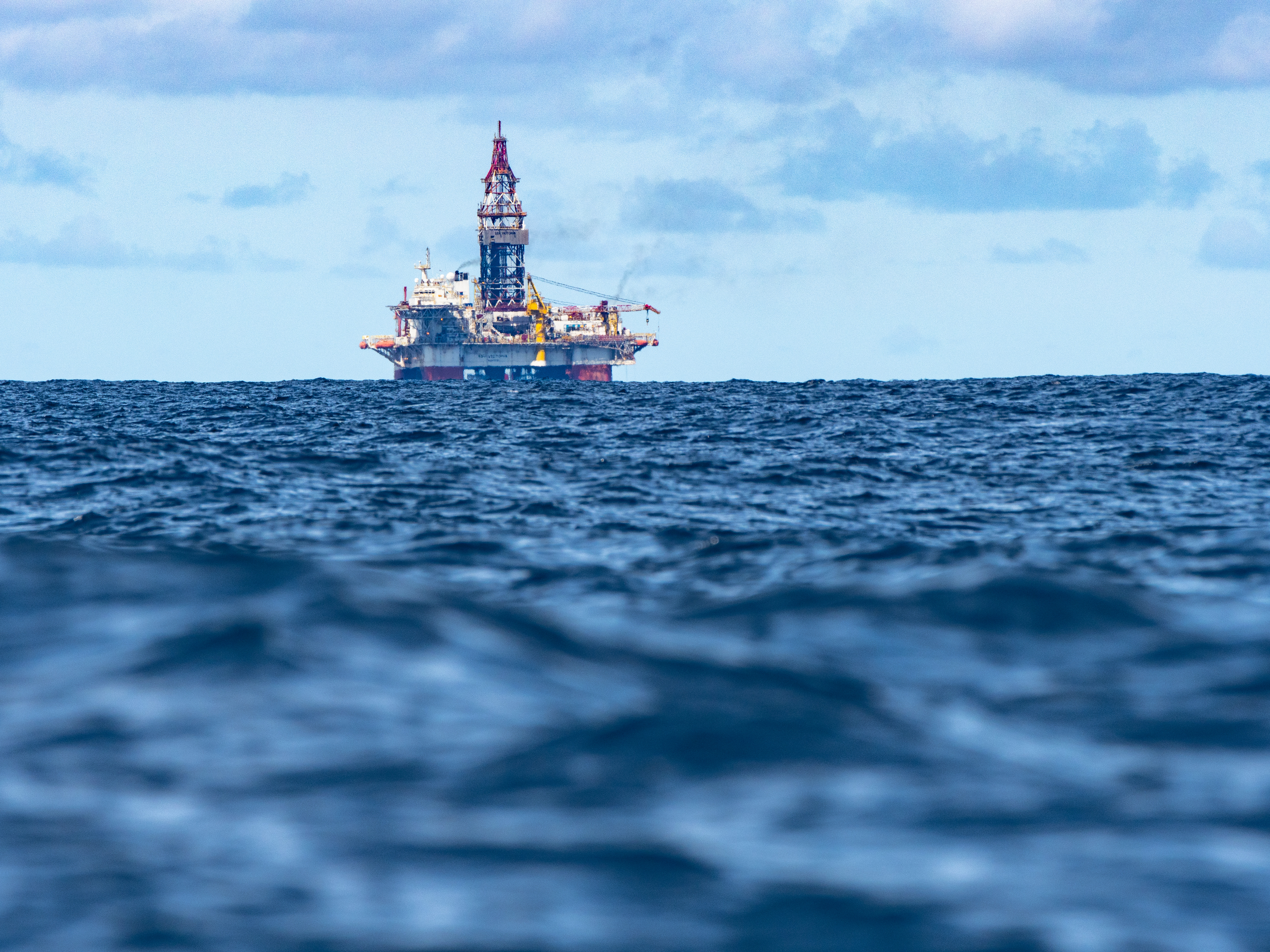
View of an oil platform in Campos oil field, Brazil

The off-shore oil exploration in the Campos Basin began in 1968. The first exploratory well was drilled in 1971. The first field to be discovered was Garoupa in 1974, at a shallow water depth of 120 metres (390 ft), followed by Namorado in 1975 in 166 metres (545 ft) of water. The first oil production started in 1977 from Enchova Field, at a water depth of 124 metres (407 ft). The largest fields, listed by their year of discovery year, include Linguado (1978), Carapeba (1982), Vermelho (1982), Marimba (1984), Albacora (1984), Marlim (1985), Albacora-Leste (1986), Marlim Sul (1987), Marlim Leste (1987), Barracuda (1989), Caratinga (1989), Espadarte (1994), Roncador (1996), Jubarte (2002), Cachalote (2002), and Badejo (2008). The largest Marlim field is located in the northeast of the basin, 110 kilometres (68 mi) offshore in water depths ranging from 650 to 1,050 metres (2,130 to 3,440 ft).

By 2003, 41 oil and gas fields were discovered, which ranging at distances from 50 to 140 kilometres (31 to 87 mi) from the coast and at water depths varying from 80 to 2,400 metres (260 to 7,870 ft). Of these fields, 37 are being developed by Petrobras. By 2003, the oil production from the basin had reached 1.21 million barrels per day. The production comes from a variety of reservoirs including siliciclastic turbidites, fractured basalts, coquinas, calcarenites (limestones). The total cumulative production from the Campos Basin by 2003 was 3.9 billion barrels of oil with remaining reserves of 8.5 billion barrels.

In February 2010, a new 65 million barrel discovery was made by Petrobras near the Barracuda oil field.

In 2020, the Enchova, Enchova Oeste, Marimbá, Piraúna, Bicudo, Bonito, Pampo, Trilha, Linguado, and Badejo concessions were sold by Petrobras to Trident Energy. These concessions are located in the shallow part of the Campos Basin, offshore Rio de Janeiro state.

== See also ==
- Angola Basin
- Pelotas Basin
- Santos Basin
