= Gas-fired power plant =

Type of power station

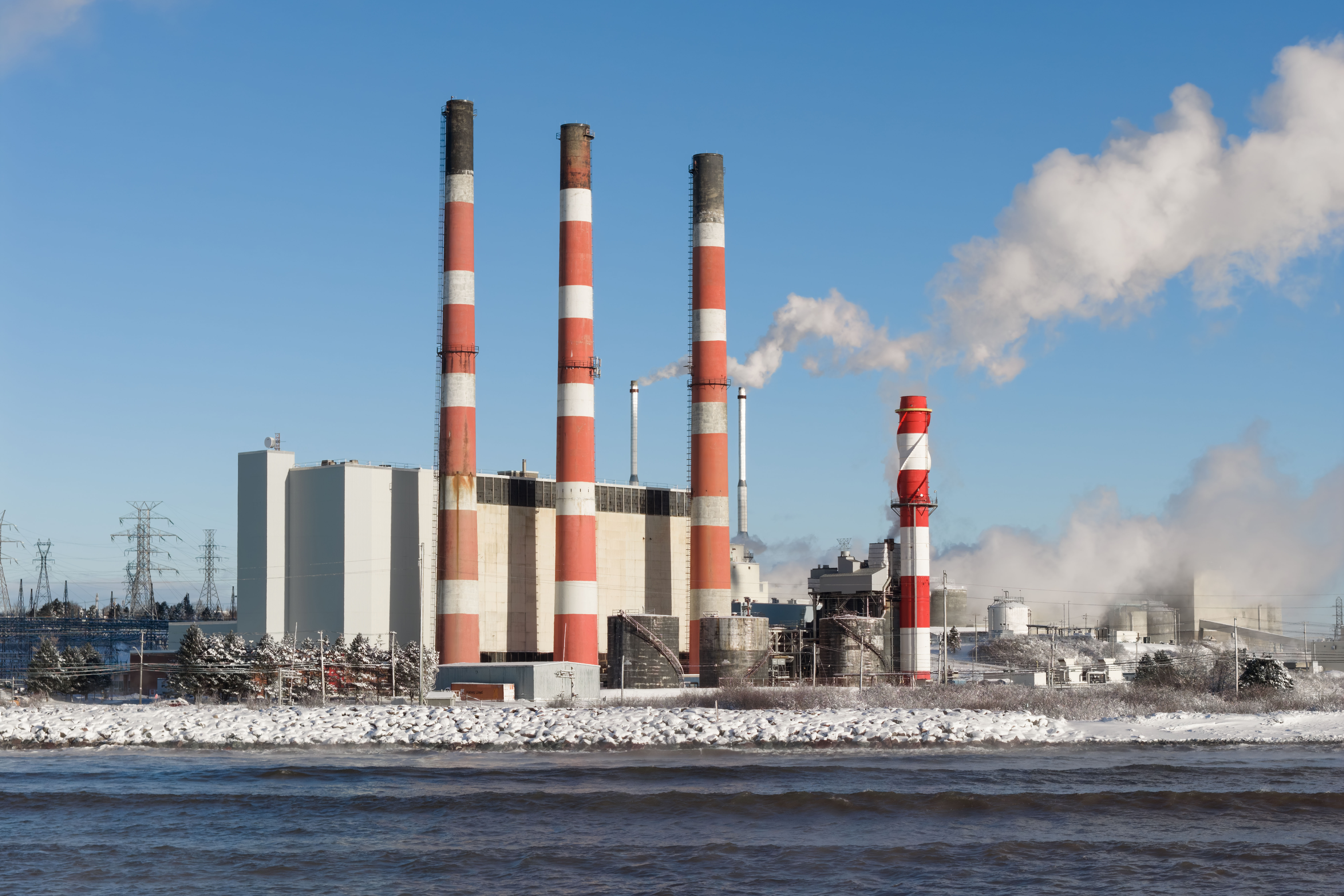
A natural gas plant in Canada

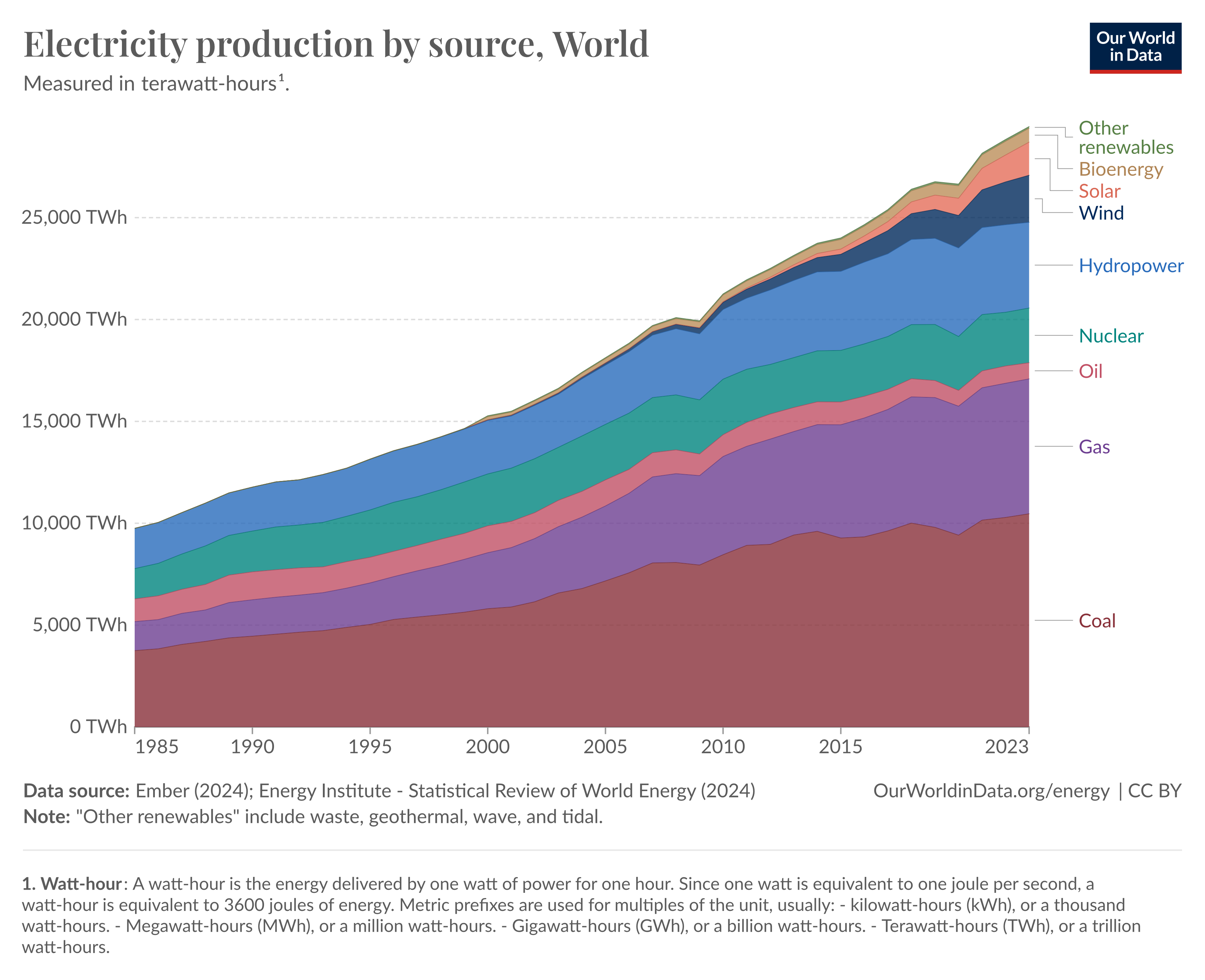
Gas generates over 20% of world electricity

Share of electricity production from gas

A gas-fired power plant, sometimes referred to as gas-fired power station, natural gas power plant, or methane gas power plant, is a thermal power station that burns natural gas to generate electricity. Gas-fired power plants generate almost a quarter of world electricity and are significant sources of greenhouse gas emissions.

Most energy planning relies on gas fired plants to provide dispatchable energy generation to compensate for variable renewable energy deficits, where hydropower or interconnectors are not available. In the early 2020s batteries became competitive with gas peaker plants.

Some natural gas plants are dual fire with other kinds of fuels, such as oil, coal or hydrogen. Most analysts don't think natural gas turbines will be successfully converted to hydrogen as part of the energy transition, becoming a stranded asset.

== Basic concepts: heat into mechanical energy into electrical energy ==
A gas-fired power plant is a type of fossil fuel power station in which chemical energy stored in natural gas, which is mainly methane, is converted successively into: thermal energy, mechanical energy and, finally, electrical energy. Although they cannot exceed the Carnot cycle limit for conversion of heat energy into useful work, the excess heat, ie the difference between the chemical energy used up and the useful work generated, may be used in cogeneration plants to heat buildings, to produce hot water, or to heat materials on an industrial scale.

== Plant types ==
=== Gas turbine ===
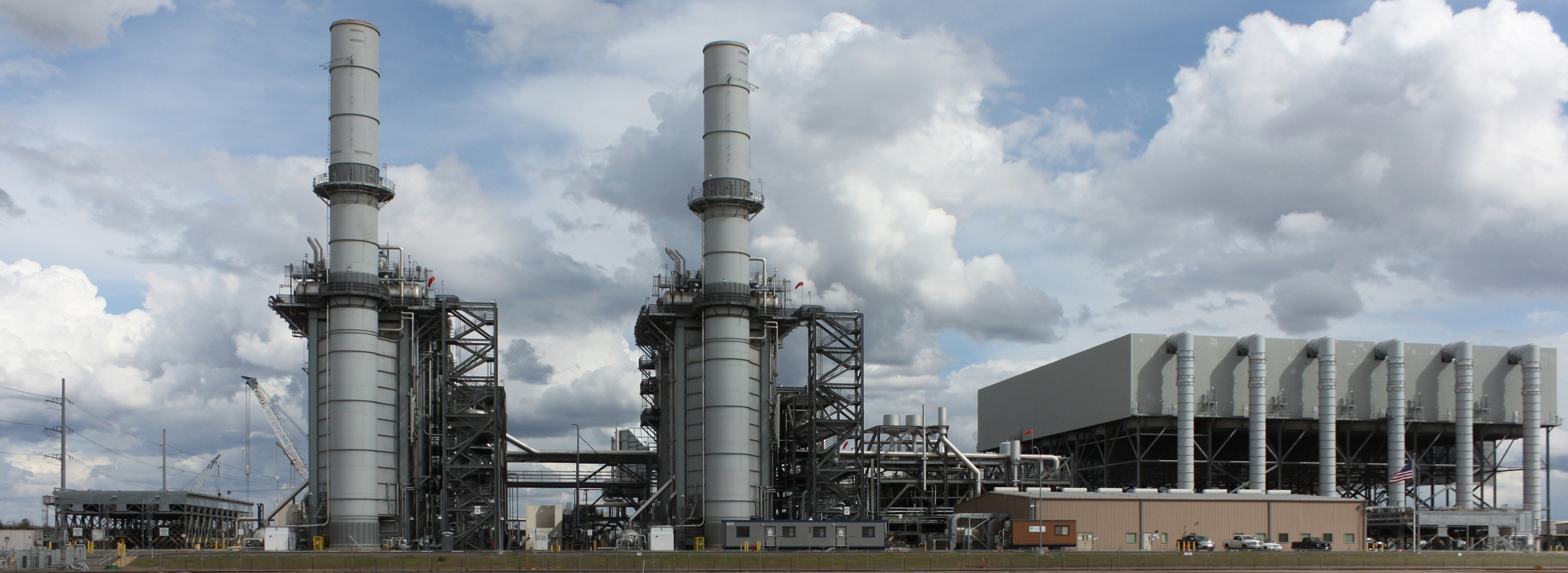
Gateway Generating Station, a combined-cycle gas-fired power station in California, uses two GE 7F.04 combustion turbines to burn natural gas.

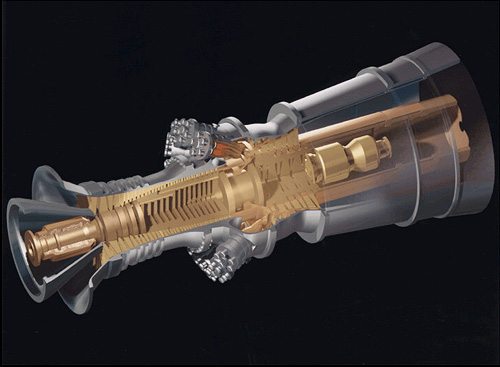
GE H series power generation gas turbine: in combined cycle configuration, its highest thermodynamic efficiency is 62.22%

Industrial gas turbines differ from aeronautical designs in that the frames, bearings, and blading are of heavier construction. They are also much more closely integrated with the devices they power—often an electric generator—and the secondary-energy equipment that is used to recover residual energy (largely heat).

Gas turbines can be particularly efficient when waste heat from the turbine is recovered by a heat recovery steam generator (HRSG) to power a conventional steam turbine in a combined cycle configuration. The 605 MW General Electric 9HA achieved a 62.22% efficiency rate with temperatures as high as 1,540 °C (2,800 °F). For 2018, GE offers its 826 MW HA at over 64% efficiency in combined cycle due to advances in additive manufacturing and combustion breakthroughs, up from 63.7% in 2017 orders and on track to achieve 65% by the early 2020s. In March 2018, GE Power achieved a 63.08% gross efficiency for its 7HA turbine.

Aeroderivative gas turbines can also be used in combined cycles, leading to a higher efficiency, but it will not be as high as a specifically designed industrial gas turbine. They can also be run in a cogeneration configuration: the exhaust is used for space or water heating, or drives an absorption chiller for cooling the inlet air and increase the power output, technology known as turbine inlet air cooling.

Another significant advantage is their ability to be turned on and off within minutes, supplying power during peak, or unscheduled, demand. Since single cycle (gas turbine only) power plants are less efficient than combined cycle plants, they are usually used as peaking power plants, which operate anywhere from several hours per day to a few dozen hours per year—depending on the electricity demand and the generating capacity of the region. In areas with a shortage of base-load and load following power plant capacity or with low fuel costs, a gas turbine powerplant may regularly operate most hours of the day. A large single-cycle gas turbine typically produces 100 to 400 megawatts of electric power and has 35–40% thermodynamic efficiency.

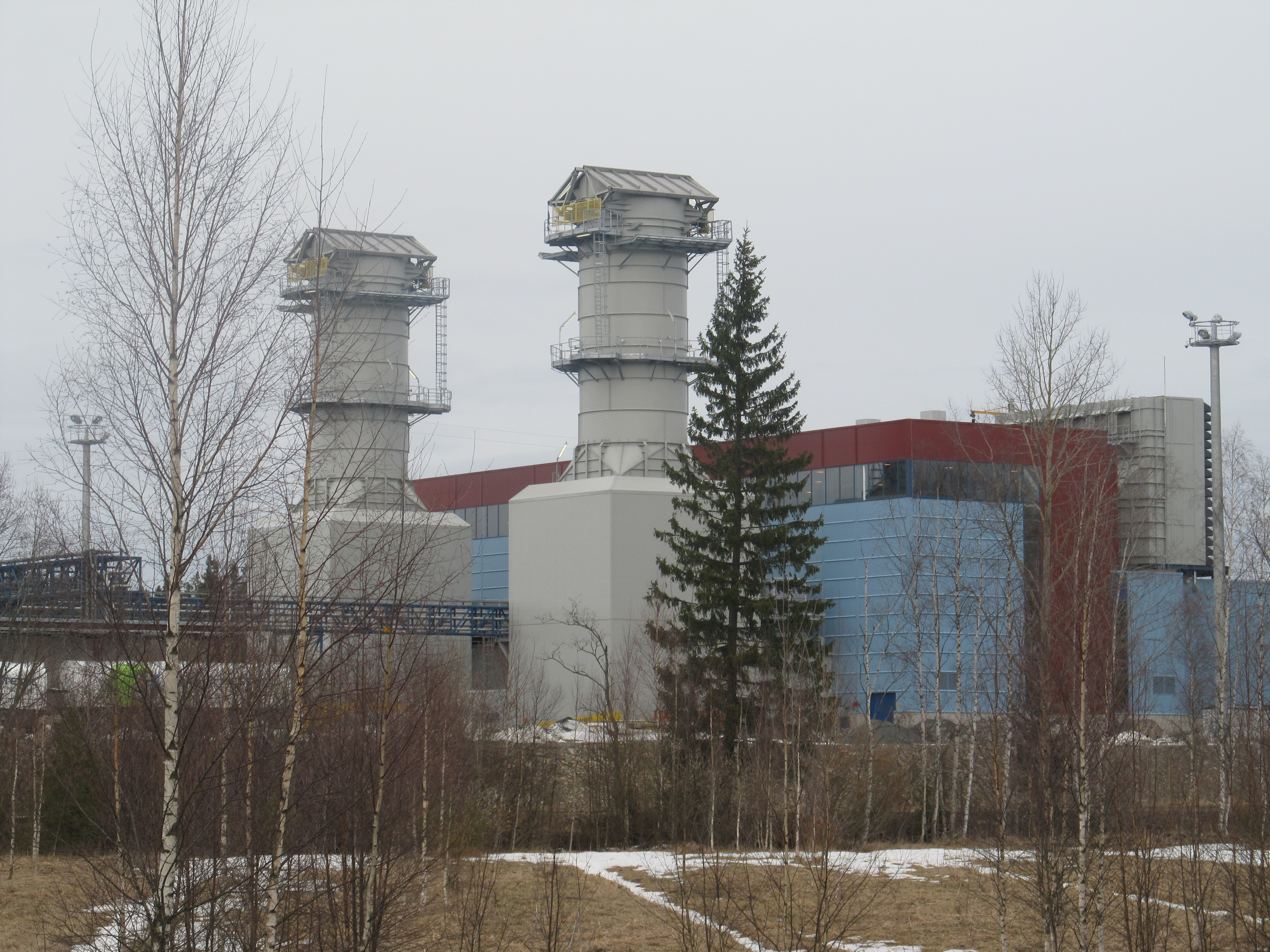
Fingrid Oyj's gas turbine power plant in Forssa, Finland

==== Simple cycle gas-turbine ====
In a simple cycle gas-turbine, also known as open-cycle gas-turbine (OCGT) generators, hot gas drives a gas turbine to generate electricity. This type of plant is relatively cheap to build and can start very quickly, but due to its lower efficiency is at most only run for a few hours a day as a peaking power plant.

==== Combined cycle gas-turbine (CCGT) ====
CCGT power plants consist of simple cycle gas-turbines which use the Brayton cycle, followed by a heat recovery steam generator and a steam turbine which use the Rankine cycle. The most common configuration is two gas-turbines supporting one steam turbine. They are slightly more expensive than simple cycle plants but can achieve efficiencies up to 55% and dispatch times of around half an hour.

=== Steam turbine ===
Gas-steam plants use gas to fire boilers which produce steam to turn steam turbines. Many of these types of plants were constructed through the 20th century as a direct alternative to coal plants. They lack the quick-start capabilities of simple cycle gas turbine plants, and are much less efficient than combined cycle plants. Owing to their age and deficiencies, they represent the vast majority of gas retirements in the United States, however, they still represent an option for extending the life of coal powered plants while reducing emissions by converting to gas burners.

=== Reciprocating engine ===
Reciprocating internal combustion engines tend to be under 20 MW, thus much smaller than other types of natural gas-fired electricity generator, and are typically used for emergency power or to balance variable renewable energy such as wind and solar.

== Greenhouse gas emissions ==
Relatively efficient gas-fired power stations – such as those based on combined cycle gas turbines – emit about 450 grams (16 oz) of CO_{2} per kilowatt-hour of electricity generated. This is about half that of coal-fired power stations but much more than nuclear power plants and renewable energy. However, the more flexible simple-cycle turbines have a significantly higher emissions intensity, frequently as high as 670 grams (24 oz) of CO_{2} per kWh, and some older gas turbines can have emissions intensities comparable with even the most emissions intensive coal power stations.

However, full Life-cycle emissions of gas-fired power stations is increased by methane emissions from gas leaks associated with gas production and distribution pipelines as well as from significant venting of waste CO_{2} after amine gas treating if carbon capture and storage is employed.

=== Carbon capture ===
Very few power plants have carbon capture and storage.

=== Hydrogen ===
Gas-fired power plants can be modified to run on hydrogen, and according to General Electric a more economically viable option than CCS would be to use more and more hydrogen in the gas turbine fuel. Hydrogen can at first be created from natural gas through steam reforming, or by heating to precipitate carbon, as a step towards a hydrogen economy, thus eventually reducing carbon emissions. However others think low-carbon hydrogen (such as natural hydrogen) should be used for things which are harder to decarbonize, such as making fertilizer, so there may not be enough for electricity generation.

== Economics ==
=== Existing plants ===
As of 2019 a few gas-fired power plants are being retired because they are unable to stop and start quickly enough. Despite the falling cost of variable renewable energy most existing gas-fired power plants remain profitable, especially in countries without a carbon price, due to their dispatchable generation and because shale gas and liquefied natural gas prices have fallen since they were built. Even in places with a carbon price, such as the EU, existing gas-fired power stations remain economically viable, partly due to increasing restrictions on coal-fired power because of its pollution.

== Politics ==
Even when replacing coal power, the decision to build a new plant may be controversial.

== See also ==
- List of natural gas power stations
