= Base load =

Minimum level of demand on an electrical grid over a span of time

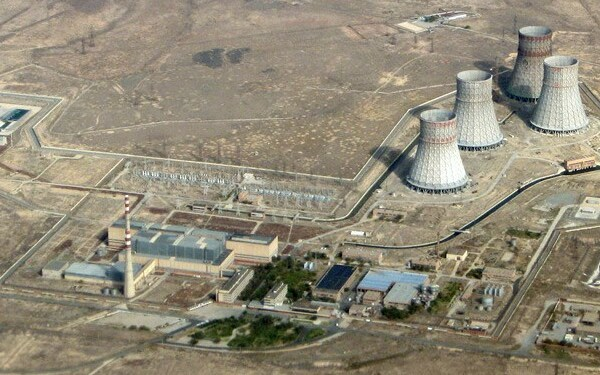
Some early nuclear plants, such as the VVER-440 (pictured at Metsamor) were designed for baseload operation

The base load (also baseload) is the minimum level of demand on an electrical grid over a span of time, for example, one week. This demand can be met by unvarying power plants or dispatchable generation, depending on which approach has the best mix of cost, availability and reliability in any particular market. The remainder of demand, varying throughout a day, is met by intermittent sources together with dispatchable generation (such as load following power plants, peaking power plants, which can be turned up or down quickly) or energy storage.

Power plants that do not change their power output quickly, such as some large coal or nuclear plants, are generally called baseload power plants. In the 20th century most or all of base load demand was met with baseload power plants, whereas new capacity based around renewables often employs flexible generation.

== Description ==
Grid operators take long and short term bids to provide electricity over various time periods and balance supply and demand continuously. The detailed adjustments are known as the unit commitment problem in electrical power production.

While historically large power grids used unvarying power plants to meet the base load, there is no specific technical requirement for this to be so. The base load can equally well be met by the appropriate quantity of intermittent power sources and dispatchable generation.

Unvarying power plants can be coal, nuclear, combined cycle plants, which may take several days to start up and shut down, hydroelectric, geothermal, biogas, and biomass.

The desirable attribute of dispatchability applies to some gas plants and hydroelectricity. Grid operators also use curtailment to shut plants out of the grid when their energy is not needed.

== Economics ==
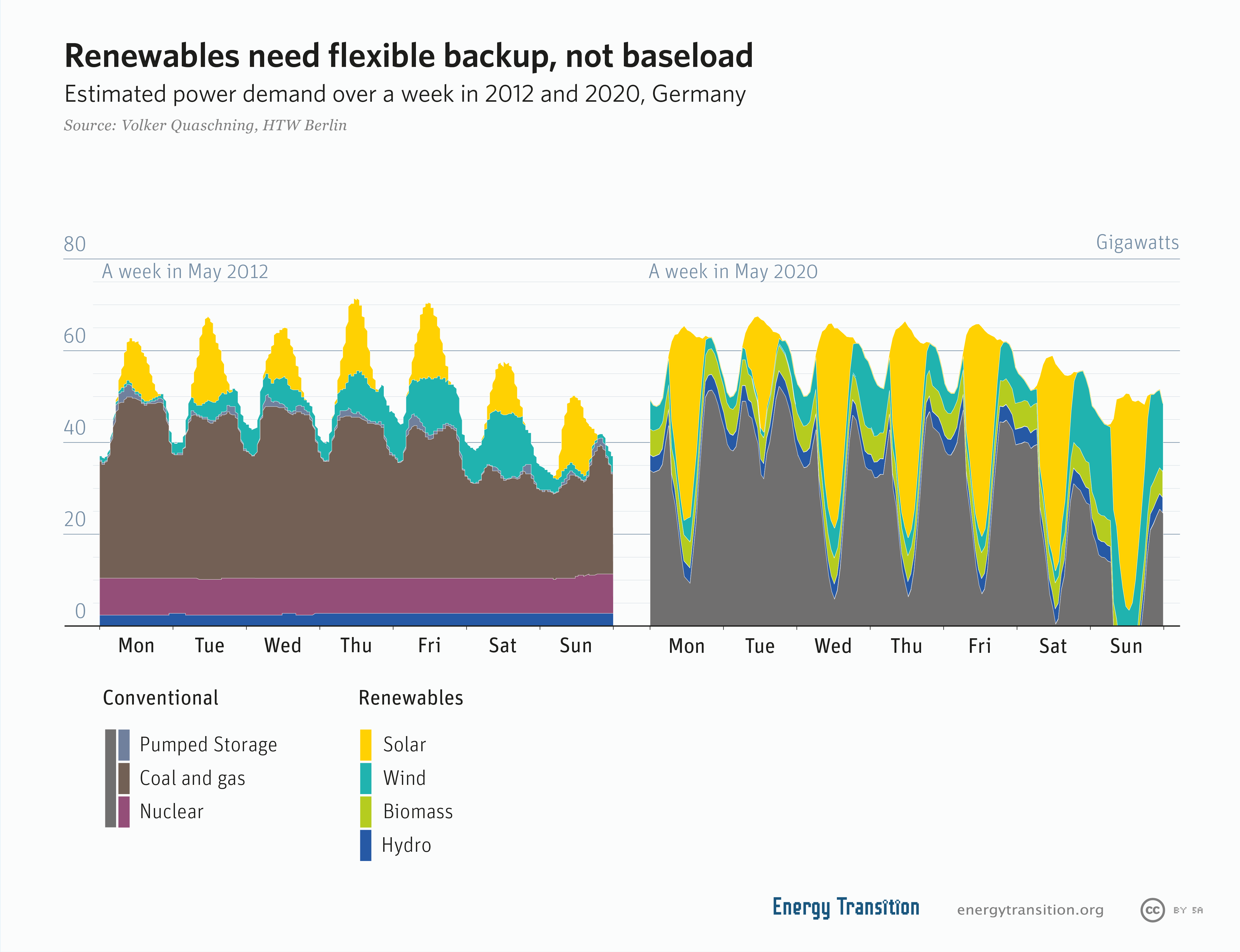
Grids with high penetration of renewable energy sources generally need more flexible generation rather than baseload generation

Grid operators solicit bids to find the cheapest sources of electricity over short and long term buying periods.

Traditionally, nuclear and coal plants had high fixed costs, high plant load factor but low marginal costs. On the other hand, peak load generators, such as natural gas, had low fixed costs, low plant load factor and high marginal costs.

Some coal and nuclear power plants do not change production to match power consumption demands since it is sometimes more economical to keep operating them at constant production levels than to reduce output during times of power price below marginal cost, and not all power plants are designed for it. The IEA has suggested that coal power plants should not run as baseload, because that emits a lot of carbon dioxide, which causes climate change. Some nuclear power stations, such as those in France, are physically capable of being used as load following power plants and do alter their output, to some degree, to help meet varying demands.

Some combined-cycle plants usually fuelled by gas, can provide baseload power, as well as being able to be cost-effectively cycled up and down to match more rapid fluctuations in consumption.

According to National Grid plc chief executive officer Steve Holliday in 2015, and others, baseload is "outdated". By 2019, Steve Holliday had left his position as CEO of National Grid plc and went on the record to say that, "It's hard to conceive that nuclear does not have an important role to play".

== See also ==
- Capacity factor
- Energy demand management
- Grid energy storage
- Load balancing (electrical power)
- Smart grid
- Load following power plant
- Peaking power plant
