= Holsworthy Community College =

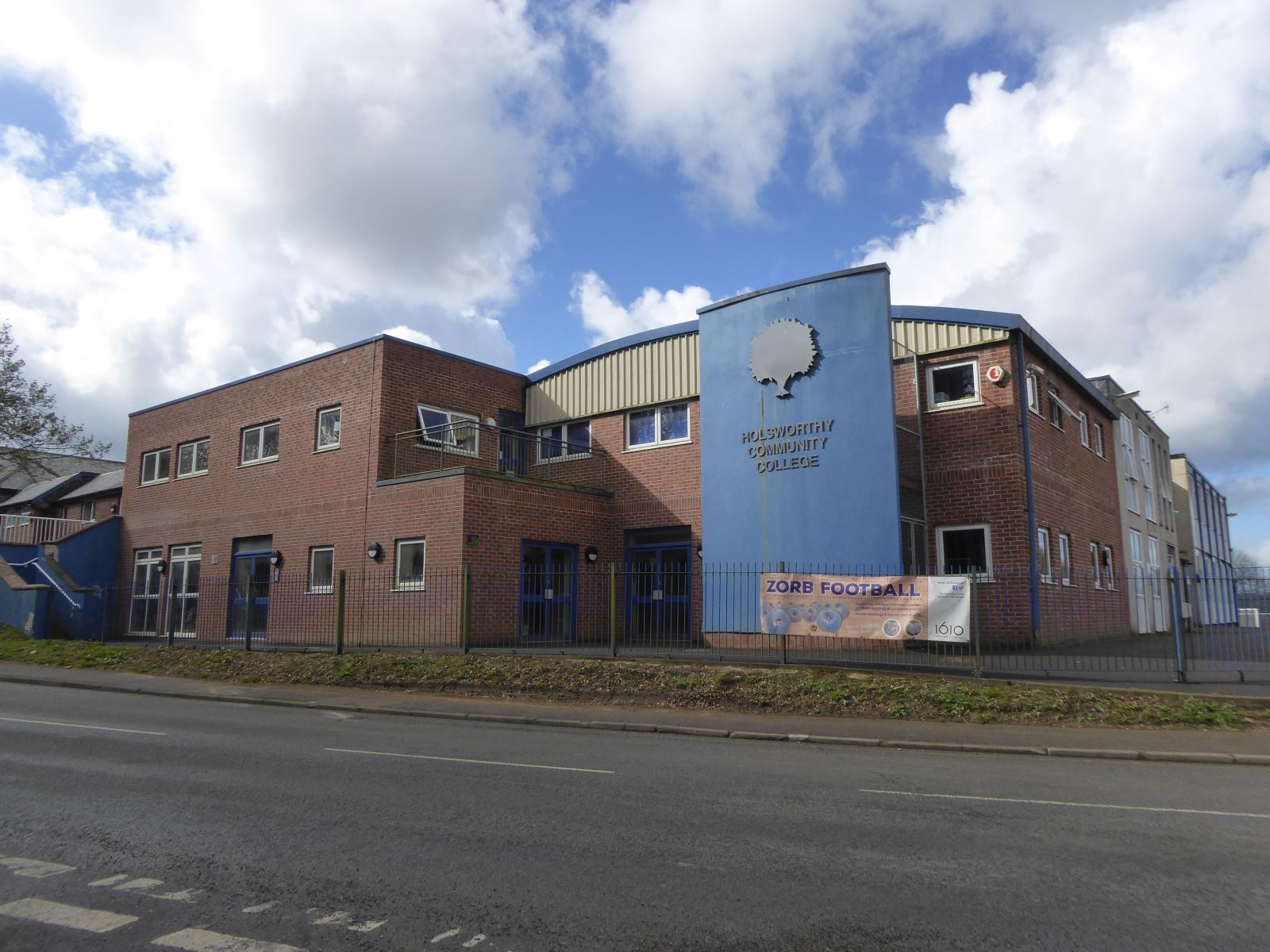
- Holsworthy Community College

Location
- Victoria Hill; Holsworthy, Devon, EX22 6JD; England
- Coordinates: 50.81231°N 4.35554°W

Information
- Type: Academy
- Local authority: Devon County Council
- Trust: Dartmoor Multi Academy Trust
- Department for Education URN: 145343 Tables
- Ofsted: Reports
- Head Teacher: Andrew Sweeney
- Gender: Co-educational
- Age: 11 to 16
- Website: http://www.hcc.devon.sch.uk/

Holsworthy Community College is a co-educational secondary school located in Holsworthy in the English county of Devon.

Previously a community school administered by Devon County Council, Holsworthy Community College became a foundation school on 31 August 2012 as part of a federation with Okehampton College. In January 2018 the school converted to academy status and is now sponsored by the Dartmoor Multi Academy Trust.

Holsworthy Community College offers GCSEs, BTECs and Cambridge Nationals as programmes of study for pupils. The school was awarded specialist Technology College status on 1 September 2006 which funded a science and technology extension to the building.
