= Steve Holliday =

- Born: Steven John Holliday; 26 October 1956 (age 69); Exeter, England
- Education: Okehampton College
- Alma mater: University of Nottingham
- Known for: CEO, National Grid plc (2007–2016)
- Board member of: Marks and Spencer
- Children: 3

Steven John Holliday (born 26 October 1956) is a British businessman and engineer. He was the chief executive officer (CEO) of the British utility company National Grid from 2007 to 2016. Holliday worked at Exxon for 19 years from 1978 to 1997, until he became a director at British Borneo Oil and Gas in 1998 and a board director for National Grid in 2001. He served as the chief executive officer of National Grid from 2007 until stepping down in 2016.

== Early life and education ==
Born in Exeter, Holliday is the son of Michael and Jean (née Day) Holliday. Holliday attended Okehampton College in Devon and then studied at the University of Nottingham where he gained a bachelor's degree in Mining Engineering in 1978.

== Career ==
=== Exxon ===
Holliday joined Exxon in 1978, where he worked for 19 years until 1997, gaining experience in all aspects of the oil and gas industry. Holliday was made operations manager of the Fawley Refinery near Southampton in the UK when he was 30 years old.

=== British Borneo Oil and Gas ===
In 1998, when British Borneo merged with Hardy Oil and Gas, Holliday became its international director. He worked at British Borneo for 3 years.

=== National Grid ===
Holliday joined the National Grid Group as the board director responsible for the UK and Europe, in March 2001. Following the merger of National Grid Group plc and Lattice Group plc in October 2002, he took responsibility for the Group's electricity and gas transmission businesses. In 2003, Holliday was promoted from group director (responsible for Worldwide Transmission Operations) to group director responsible for the UK Gas Distribution and Business Services. Holliday was also appointed the chief executive of Transco. Holliday became chief executive officer (CEO) of National Grid plc in January 2007. In 2009, Holliday's total compensation for the role of CEO was £2.2 million, consisting of a £929,000 annual salary, and a £1,277,000 bonus. In 2016, Holliday expressed the view that the concept of baseload was "outdated", as microgrids would become the primary means of production, and large powerplants relegated to supply the remainder. In November 2015, National Grid announced that Holliday would step down as CEO in March 2016, and that John Pettigrew, the UK executive director who had joined National Grid 25 years earlier, would succeed Holliday. Holliday left National Grid in July 2016.

=== Magnox Inquiry ===
In March 2017, Greg Clark MP, the UK Secretary of State for Energy, established an independent Inquiry into the conduct of a 2012 decommissioning services procurement process undertaken by the Nuclear Decommissioning Authority and the reasons why the contract, subsequently awarded to Cavendish Fluor Partnership in 2014, "proved unsustainable". Holliday was asked to lead the Inquiry. Clark asked the Inquiry to take a ‘cradle to grave’ approach beginning with the NDA’s procurement and ending with the contract termination, to review the conduct of the NDA and of government departments, and to "make any recommendations it sees fit". Interim findings were published in October 2017.

== Directorships ==
In 2004, Holliday joined the board of the Marks and Spencer Group as a non-executive director.

== Awards and recognition ==
In 2013, Holliday was awarded an honorary degree from the University of Strathclyde for his contributions to the power and energy sector.

In 2009, Holliday achieved an entry in Who's Who, as follows:

"Chief Executive National Grid since 2007, b. Exeter 26th October 1956, son of Michael and Jean Holliday m. Kate Patterson; three d. Educ: University of Nottingham (BSc Mining Engineering 78). Esso/Exxon, 1978–1997; Ops. Manager, Fawley Refinery, Esso UK, 1988–92; Supply & Transportation Divl Dir, Esso UK 1992–94; Regl Vice-President, Gas, Exxon Co. International 1994–97; Bd Dir, British Borneo Oil & Gas, 1997–2000; National Grid Bd Dir responsible for Transmission, 2001–03; Gp Dir responsible for UK Gas Distribution and Business Services, 2003–07; Non-exec Dir Marks & Spencer, 2004-->; Recreations: sports, Rugby, skiing, arts."

in 2010, Holliday was elected a Fellow of the Royal Academy of Engineering.

== Personal life ==
Holliday married Katharine Patterson in 1996 in Enfield. The couple had two children and lived in West London. They divorced in 2024.
