= Okehampton College =

Location
- Mill Road; Okehampton, Devon, EX20 1PW; England; 50.73623°N 3.99887°W

Information
- Type: Academy
- Local authority: Devon County Council
- Trust: Dartmoor Multi-Academy Trust
- Department for Education URN: 145337 Tables
- Ofsted: Reports
- Principal: Andrew Sweeney
- Gender: Co-educational
- Age: 11 to 18
- Capacity: 1,437
- Houses: Oak, Elm, Maple, Ash
- Website: http://www.okehamptoncollege.devon.sch.uk/

Okehampton College is a co-educational secondary school and sixth form located in Okehampton in the English county of Devon.

== History ==
Previously a foundation school administered by Devon County Council, in January 2018 Okehampton College converted to academy status and is now sponsored by the Dartmoor Multi-Academy Trust.

== Admissions ==
Pupils are normally admitted from Boasley Cross Community Primary School, Bridestowe Primary School, Chagford CE Primary School, Exbourne CE Primary School, Hatherleigh Community Primary School, Lew Trenchard CE Primary School, Lydford School, Northlew & Ashbury Parochial Primary School, North Tawton Community Primary School, Okehampton Primary School and South Tawton Primary School. The school also operates a federation with Holsworthy Community College in Holsworthy.

== Academics ==
Okehampton College offers GCSEs, BTECs and OCR Nationals as programmes of study for pupils, while students in the sixth form have the option to study from a range of A Levels, NVQs and further BTECs.

== Notable awards ==
- Zayed Future Energy Prize - 2013 winner
- 'Outstanding' OFSTED report - 2014

== Notable former pupils ==
- Georgina Geikie, sport shooter
- Steve Holliday, businessman
- Billy Searle, professional rugby player
