= Hardy Oil and Gas =

British oil and gas business

- Company type: Public (LSE: HDY)
- Industry: Energy
- Founded: 1997
- Headquarters: London, UK
- Key people: Paul Mortimer, Chairman; Sastry Karra, CEO
- Revenue: $11,829.6 million (2007)
- Operating income: $(813.3) million (2007)
- Net income: $8,316.0 million (2007)
- Website: www.hardyoil.com

Hardy Oil and Gas plc was a British-based oil and gas exploration and production business. It is now based in the Isle of Man and was a former constituent of the FTSE 250 Index.

== History ==
The business had its origins in a company established by Trafalgar House as Hardy Oil and Gas to exploit North Sea oil reserves in the 1970s.

The business was restructured on merger by S. Karra and Y. Sharma in 1997 as Jehan Energy Ltd to exploit oil and gas opportunities in India.

In 1999 British-Borneo Exploration merged with Hardy Oil and Gas. Charles Reimer became president. Due to the merger changes were made to the executive board - Alan Gaynor was CEO; Peter Hill became technical director and Steve Holliday was international director. Mark Adams, Will Roach, Mike Adams and Mike King were named VPs.

In 1999 Jehan Energy Ltd acquired the Indian interests of the original Hardy Oil and Gas and changed its own name in 2001 to Hardy Oil and Gas plc. (The non-Indian interests were acquired by Eni.)

In 2005 the Company was first listed on the Alternative Investment Market of the London Stock Exchange; it has since moved to the main market.

In 2007 the Company announced a successful well test on the Oza field in Nigeria.

The Company was reclassified as a constituent of the FTSE SmallCap Index on 22 December 2008, thereby dropping out of the FTSE 250 Index and FTSE 350 Index.

The company sold off Hardy Exploration & Production (India) Inc. (HEPI) in October 2019 to Hindustan Oil Exploration Co. Ltd. (HOEC). Hardy effectively became a cash shell

== Operations ==
The business was organised into two geographic areas:

- India as HEPI
- Nigeria
