= John Pettigrew (businessman) =

British businessman, Former National Grid CEO

- Born: John Mark Pettigrew; October 1968 (age 57); Pontypridd, Wales, U.K.
- Education: Cardiff University
- Occupations: Former CEO, National Grid plc
- Children: 2 daughters
- Parent(s): John Pettigrew; Patricia Pettigrew

John Mark Pettigrew CBE (born October 1968) is a British businessman, and the former CEO of National Grid plc.

== Early life ==
John Mark Pettigrew was born in October 1968 in Pontypridd, Wales. His father was John Pettigrew and his mother, Patricia.

Pettigrew graduated from Cardiff University, where he earned a bachelor of science in economics and a master's degree in international economics and banking.

== Career ==
Pettigrew joined National Grid as a graduate in 1991. He joined the board in April 2014.

In November 2015, it was announced that Steve Holliday, the CEO for ten years, would leave in March 2016, and that Pettigrew, its UK executive director who joined National Grid in 1991, would succeed him. Pettigrew stepped down as CEO in November 2025.
