= Load-following power plant =

Power plant that adjusts output based on demand

A load-following power plant, regarded as producing mid-merit or mid-priced electricity, is a power plant that adjusts its power output as demand for electricity fluctuates throughout the day. Load-following plants are typically in between base load and peaking power plants in efficiency, speed of start-up and shut-down, construction cost, cost of electricity and capacity factor.

== Base load and peaking power plants ==
Base load power plants are dispatchable plants that tend to operate at maximum output. They generally shut down or reduce power only to perform maintenance or repair or due to grid constraints. Power plants operated mostly in this way include coal, fuel oil, nuclear, geothermal, run-of-the-river hydroelectric, solar, biomass and combined cycle natural gas plants.

Peaking power plants operate only during times of peak demand. In countries with widespread air conditioning, demand peaks around the middle of the afternoon, so a typical peaking power plant may start up a couple of hours before this point and shut down a couple of hours after. The duration of operation for peaking plants varies from a good portion of the waking day to only a couple of dozen hours per year.

Peaking power plants include hydroelectric and gas turbine power plants. Many gas turbine power plants can be fueled with natural gas, fuel oil, and/or diesel, allowing greater flexibility in choice of operation- for example, while most gas turbine plants primarily burn natural gas, a supply of fuel oil and/or diesel is sometimes kept on hand in case the gas supply is interrupted. Other gas turbines can only burn a single fuel.

== Load-following power plants ==
By way of contrast, load-following power plants usually run during the day and early evening, and are operated in direct response to changing demand for power supply. They either shut down or greatly curtail output during the night and early morning, when the demand for electricity is the lowest. The exact hours of operation depend on numerous factors. One of the most important factors for a particular plant is how efficiently it can convert fuel into electricity. The most efficient plants, which are almost invariably the least costly to run per kilowatt-hour produced, are brought online first.

As demand increases, the next most efficient plants are brought on line and so on. The status of the electrical grid in that region, especially how much base load generating capacity it has, and the variation in demand are also very important. An additional factor for operational variability is that demand does not vary just between night and day. There are significant variations in the time of year and day of the week. A region that has large variations in demand will require a large load following or peaking power plant capacity because base load power plants can only cover the capacity equal to that needed during times of lowest demand.

Load-following power plants can be hydroelectric power plants, diesel and gas engine power plants, combined cycle gas turbine power plants and steam turbine power plants that run on natural gas or heavy fuel oil, although heavy fuel oil plants make up a very small portion of the energy mix. A relatively efficient model of gas turbine that runs on natural gas can also make a decent load-following plant.

=== Gas turbine power plants ===
Gas turbine power plants are the most flexible in terms of adjusting power level, but are also among the most expensive to operate. Therefore, they are generally used as "peaking" units at times of maximum power demand or Combined cycle or cogeneration power plants where turbine exhaust waste heat can be economically used to generate additional power and thermal energy for process or space heating.

=== Diesel and gas engine power plants ===
Diesel and gas engine power plants can be used for base load to stand-by power production due to their high overall flexibility. Such power plants can be started rapidly to meet the grid demands. These engines can be operated efficiently on a wide variety of fuels, adding to their flexibility.

Some applications are: base load power generation, wind-diesel, load following, cogeneration and trigeneration.

=== Hydroelectric power plants ===
Hydroelectric power plants can operate as base load, load following or peaking power plants. They have the ability to start within minutes, and in some cases seconds. How the plant operates depends heavily on its water supply, as many plants do not have enough water to operate near their full capacity on a continuous basis.

Where hydroelectric dams or associated reservoirs exist, these can often be backed up, reserving the hydro draw for a peak time. This introduces ecological and mechanical stress, so is practiced less today than previously. Lakes and man-made reservoirs used for hydropower come in all sizes, holding enough water for as little as a one-day supply (a diurnal peak variance), or as much as a year's supply, allowing for seasonal peak variance.

A plant with a reservoir that holds less than the annual river flow may change its operating style depending on the season of the year. For example, the plant may operate as a peaking plant during the dry season, as a base load plant during the wet season and as a load-following plant between seasons. A plant with a large reservoir may operate independently of wet and dry seasons, such as operating at maximum capacity during peak heating or cooling seasons.

When electrical generation supplying the grid and the consumption or load on the electrical grid are in balance, the frequency of the alternating current is at its normal rate (either 50 or 60 hertz). Hydroelectric power plants can be utilized for making extra revenue in an electric grid with erratic grid frequency. When grid frequency is above normal, e.g. Indian grid frequency is exceeding the rated 50 Hz for most of the duration in a month/day, the extra power available can be consumed by adding extra load, say agriculture water pumps, to the grid and this new energy draw is available at nominal price or no price. However, there may not be a guarantee of continued supply at that price when the grid frequency falls below normal, which would then call for a higher price.

To arrest the fall of frequency below normal, the available hydro power plants are kept in no load/nominal load operation and the load is automatically ramped up or down strictly following the grid frequency, i.e. the hydro units would run at no load condition when frequency is above 50 Hz and generate power up to full load in case the grid frequency is below 50 Hz. Thus a utility can draw two or more times energy from the grid by loading the hydro units less than 50% of the duration and the effective use of available water is enhanced more than twice the conventional peak load operation.

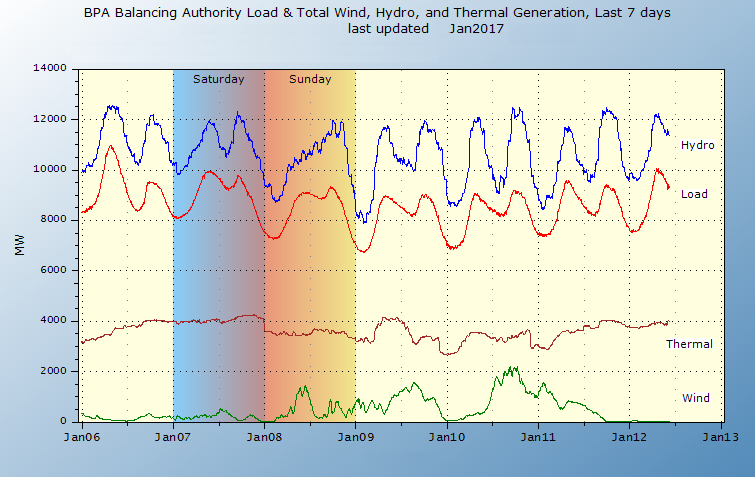

Example of daily peak load (for the Bonneville Power Administration) with large hydro, base load thermal generation and intermittent wind power. Hydro is load following and managing the peaks, with some response from base load thermal. Note that total generation is always greater than the total BPA load because most of the time BPA is a net exporter of energy. The BPA load does not include scheduled energy to other balancing authority areas.

=== Coal-fired power plants ===
Large-size coal-fired thermal power plants can also be used as load-following / variable-load power stations to varying extents, with hard coal-fueled plants typically being significantly more flexible than lignite-fueled coal plants. Some of the features which may be found in coal plants that have been optimized for load following include:

- Sliding pressure operation: Sliding pressure operation of the steam generator allows the power plant to generate electricity without much deterioration in fuel efficiency at part load operation down to 75% of the nameplate capacity.
- Over loading capability: The power plants are generally designed to run at 5 to 7% above the name plate rating for 5% duration in a year
- Frequency follow governor controls: The load generation can be automatically varied to suit the grid frequency needs.
- Two shift daily operation for five days in a week: The needed warm and hot start up of these power stations are designed to take lesser time to achieve full load operation. Thus these power plants are not strictly base load power generation units.
- HP/LP steam bypass systems: This feature allows the steam turbo generator to reduce the load quickly and allows the steam generator to adjust to the load requirement with a lag.

=== Nuclear power plants ===
Historically, nuclear power plants were built as baseload plants, without load-following capability to keep the design simple. Their startup or shutdown took many hours as they were designed to operate at maximum power, and heating up steam generators to the desired temperature took time. Nuclear power generation has been also portrayed as inflexible by anti-nuclear activists and the German Federal Environment Ministry, while others claimed "that the plants might clog the power grid".

Modern nuclear plants with light water reactors are designed to have maneuvering capabilities in the 30–100% range with 5%/minute slope, up to 140 MW/minute. Nuclear power plants in France operate in load-following mode and so participate in the primary and secondary frequency control. Some units follow a variable load program with one or two large power changes per day. Some designs allow for rapid changes of power level around rated power, a capability that is usable for frequency regulation. A more efficient solution is to maintain the primary circuit at full power and to use the excess power for cogeneration.

While most nuclear power plants in operation as of early 2000's were already designed with strong load following capabilities, they might have not been used as such for purely economic reasons: nuclear power generation is composed almost entirely of fixed and sunk costs so lowering the power output doesn't significantly reduce generating costs, so it is more effective to run them at full power most of the time. In countries where the baseload was predominantly nuclear (e.g. France) the load-following mode became economical due to overall electricity demand fluctuating throughout the day.

==== Boiling water reactors ====
Boiling water reactors (BWRs) can vary the speed of recirculation water flow to quickly reduce their power level down to 60% of rated power (up to 10%/minute), making them useful for overnight load-following. They can also use control rod manipulation to achieve deeper reductions in power. A few BWR designs do not have recirculation pumps, and these designs must rely solely on control rod manipulation in order to load follow, which is possibly less ideal. In markets such as Chicago, Illinois where half of the local utility's fleet is BWRs, it is common to load-follow (although potentially less economic to do so).

==== Pressurized water reactors ====
Pressurized water reactors (PWRs) use a combination of a chemical shim, typically boron, in the moderator/coolant, control rod manipulation, and turbine speed control (see nuclear reactor technology) to modify power levels. For PWRs not explicitly designed with load following in mind, load following operation isn't quite as common as it is with BWRs. Modern PWRs are generally designed to handle extensive regular load following, and both French and German PWRs in particular have historically been designed with varying degrees of enhanced load following capabilities.

France in particular has a long history of utilizing aggressive load following with their PWRs, which are capable of, and used for, both primary and secondary frequency control, in addition to load following. French PWRs use so called "grey" control rods which have lower neutron absorption capability and are used for fine-tuning reactor power, as opposed to "black" control rods in order to maneuver power more rapidly than chemical shim control or conventional control rods allow.

These reactors have the capability to regularly vary their output between 30–100% of rated power, to maneuver power up or down by 2–5%/minute during load following activities, and to participate in primary and secondary frequency control at ±2–3% (primary frequency control) and ±3–5% (secondary frequency control, ≥5% for N4 reactors in Mode X). Depending on the exact design and operating mode, their ability to handle low power operation or fast ramping may be partially limited during the very late stages of the fuel cycle.

==== Pressurized heavy water reactors ====
Modern CANDU designs have extensive steam bypass capabilities that allow for a different method of load following that does not necessarily involve changes in reactor power output. Bruce Nuclear Generating Station is a CANDU pressurized heavy water reactor that regularly utilizes its ability to partially bypass steam to the condenser for extended periods of time while the turbine is operating to provide 300 MW per unit (2400 MW total for the eight-unit plant) of flexible (load following) operation capabilities. Reactor power is maintained at the same level during steam bypass operations, which completely avoids xenon poisoning and other concerns associated with maneuvering reactor power output.

=== Solar thermal power plants ===
Concentrated solar power plants with thermal storage may be an option for load-following power plants. They can serve the load demand and work as base load power plants when the extracted solar energy is found excess in a day. Proper mix of solar thermal storage and solar PV can match the daily load fluctuations, potentially providing power after sunset.

=== Fuel cell power plants ===
Hydrogen-based fuel cell power plants are perfect load-following power plants like emergency DG sets or battery storage systems. They can be run from zero to full load within few minutes. As the transportation of hydrogen to the faraway industrial consumers is costly, the surplus hydrogen produced as byproduct from various chemical plants is used for power generation by the fuel cell power plants. Also they do not cause air and water pollution. In fact they clean the ambient air by extracting PM2.5 particulates and also generate pure water for drinking and industrial applications.

== Solar PV and wind power plants ==
The variable power from renewable energy such as solar and wind power plants can be used to follow the load or stabilize the grid frequency with the help of various means of storage. For countries that are trending away from coal fired baseload plants and towards intermittent energy sources such as wind and solar, that have not yet fully implemented smart grid measures such as demand side management to rapidly respond to changes in this supply, there may be a need for dedicated peaking or load-following power plants and the use of a grid intertie, at least until the peak blunting and load shifting mechanisms are implemented widely enough to match supply. See smart grid alternatives below.

Rechargeable battery storage as of 2018, when custom-built new for this purpose without re-using electric vehicle batteries, cost $209 per kWh on average in the United States. When the grid frequency is below the desired or rated value, the power being generated, if any, and the stored battery power is fed to the grid to raise the grid frequency. When the grid frequency is above the desired or rated value, the power being generated is fed or surplus grid power is drawn, in case cheaply available, to the battery units for energy storage. The grid frequency keeps on fluctuating 50 to 100 times in a day above and below the rated value depending on the type of load encountered and the type of generating plants in the electrical grid. Recently, the cost of battery units, solar power plants, etc. have come down drastically to utilise secondary power for power grid stabilization as an on line spinning reserve.

New studies have also evaluated both wind and solar plants to follow fast load changes. A study by Gevorgian et al has shown the ability of solar plants to provide load following and fast reserves in both island power systems like Puerto Rico and large power systems in California.

=== Solar and wind intensive smart grids ===
The decentralized and intermittent nature of solar and wind generation entails building signalling networks across vast areas. These include large consumers with discretionary uses, and increasingly include much smaller users. Collectively, these signalling and communication technologies are called the "smart grid". When these technologies reach into most grid-connected devices the term Energy Internet is sometimes used, though this is more commonly considered to be an aspect of the Internet of Things.

In 2010, US FERC Chairman Jon Wellinghof outlined the Obama administration's view that strongly preferred smart grid signalling over dedicated load-following power plants, describing following as inherently inefficient. In Scientific American he listed some such measures:

- "turning off the defrost cycle on the refrigerator at a given time...the grid could signal...As long as that refrigerator got defrosted at the end of the day, you, as a consumer, wouldn't care but ultimately the grid could operate more efficiently."
- "...if you didn't do that with the refrigerator you would have do that with the coal plant or combustion turbine running up and down, and doing that makes that unit run much more inefficiently."

At the time, electric vehicle battery integration into the grid was beginning. Wellinghof referred (ibid) to "these cars now getting paid in Delaware: $7 to $10 a day per car. They are getting paid over $3,000 a year to use these cars to simply control regulation service on the grid when they are charged".

== Electric vehicle batteries as distributed load following or storage ==
Due to the very high cost of dedicated battery storage, use of electric vehicle batteries both while charging in vehicles (see smart grid), and in stationary grid energy storage arrays as an end-of-life re-use once they no longer hold enough charge for road use, has become the preferred method of load following over dedicated power plants. Such stationary arrays act as a true load-following power plant, and their deployment can "improve the affordability of purchasing such vehicles...Batteries that reach the end of their useful lifespan within the automotive industry can still be considered for other applications as between 70-80% of their original capacity still remains."

Such batteries are often repurposed in home arrays which primarily serve as backup, so can participate much more readily in grid stabilizing. The number of such batteries doing nothing is increasing rapidly, e.g. in Australia where Tesla Powerwall demand rose 30 times after major power outages.

Home and vehicle batteries are always and necessarily charged responsively when supply is available, meaning they all participate in a smart grid, because the high load (one Japanese estimate was over 7 GW for half the cars in Kanto) simply cannot be managed on an analog grid, lest "The uncoordinated charging can result in creation of a new peak-load" (ibid).

Given the charging must be managed, there is no incremental cost to delay charging or discharge these batteries as required for load following, merely a software change and in some cases a payment for the inconvenience of less than complete charging or for battery wear (e.g. "$7 to $10 a day per car" paid in Delaware).

Rocky Mountain Institute in 2015 listed the applications of such distributed networks of batteries as (for "ISOs / RTOs") including "energy storage can bid into wholesale electricity markets" or for utility services including:

- Frequency regulation
- Spinning and non-spinning reserves
- Load following / energy arbitrage
- Black start
- Voltage support

RMI claimed "batteries can provide these services more reliably and at a lower cost than the technology that currently provides a majority of them thermal power plants (see above re coal and gas)", and also that "storage systems installed behind the customer meter can be dispatched to provide deferral or adequacy services to utilities", such as:

- "Transmission and distribution upgrade deferral. When load forecasts indicate transmission or distribution nodes will exceed their rated load carrying capacity, incremental investments in energy storage can be used to effectively increase the node’s capacity and avoid large, overbuilt, expensive upgrades to the nodes themselves."
- "Transmission congestion relief. At certain times of the day, ISOs charge utilities to use congested transmission lines. Discharging energy storage systems located downstream of congested lines can avoid these charges."
- "Resource adequacy. Instead of using or investing in combustion turbines to meet peak generation requirements, utilities can call upon other assets like energy storage instead."

== See also ==
- Grid energy storage
- Cost of electricity by source
- Economics of nuclear power plants (for more cost comparisons)
- Base load power plant
- Peaking power plant
- Dispatchable generation
- Emergency power system
