= Turbine inlet air cooling =

Ways to cool down intake air of gas turbines

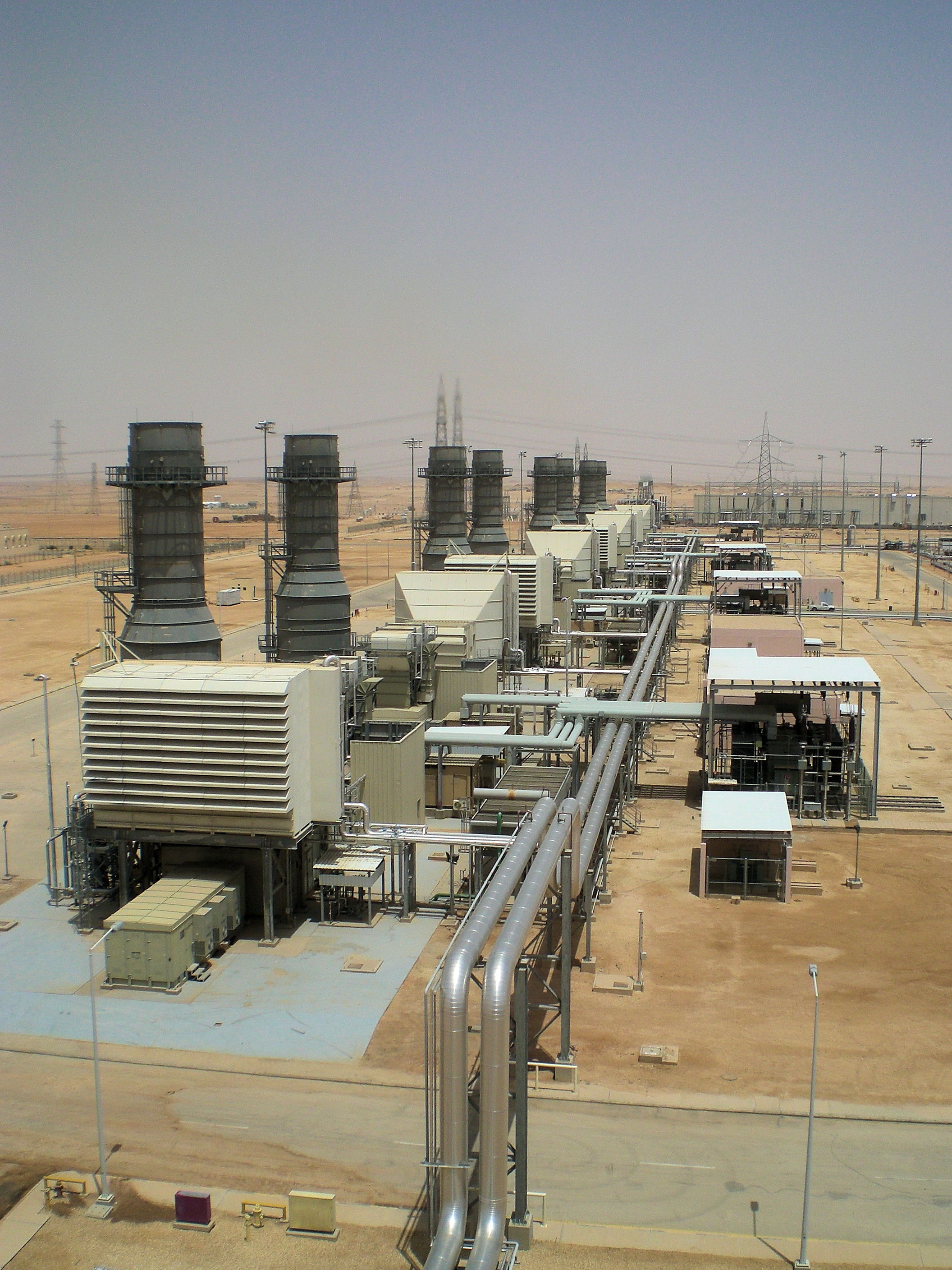
An inlet air cooling system installed in a desert-dry area to increase turbine power output

Turbine inlet air cooling is a group of technologies and techniques consisting of cooling down the intake air of the gas turbine. The direct consequence of cooling the turbine inlet air is power output augmentation. It may also improve the energy efficiency of the system. This technology is widely used in hot climates with high ambient temperatures that usually coincides with on-peak demand period.

== Principles ==
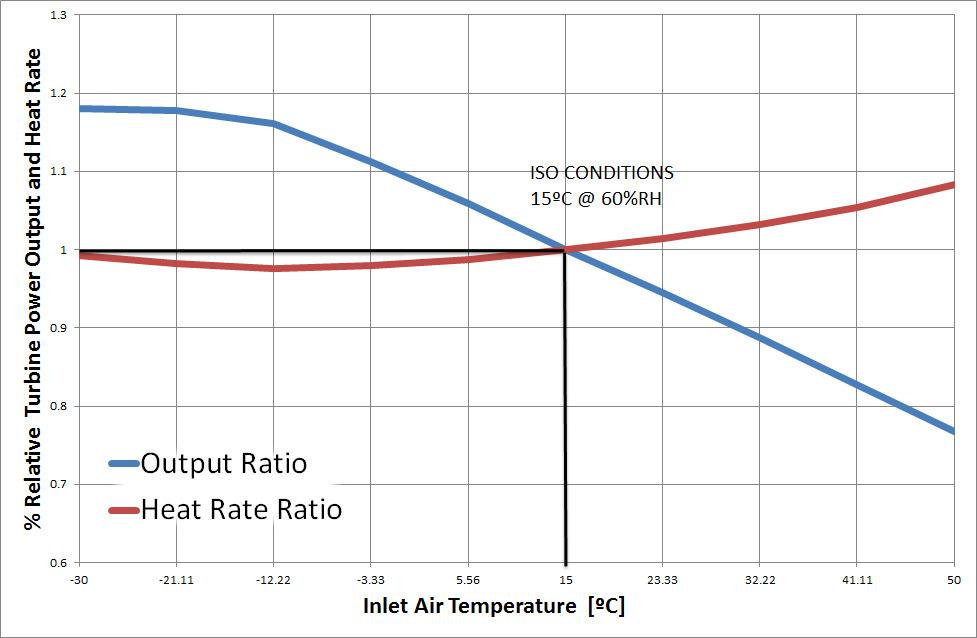
Effect of inlet air cooling on power output

Gas turbines take in filtered, fresh ambient air and compress it in the compressor stage. The compressed air is mixed with fuel in the combustion chamber and ignited. This produces a high-temperature and high-pressure flow of exhaust gases that enter in a turbine and produce the shaft work output that is generally used to turn an electric generator as well as powering the compressor stage.

As the gas turbine is a constant volume machine, the air volume introduced in the combustion chamber after the compression stage is fixed for a given shaft speed (rpm). Thus the air mass flow in is directly related to the density of air, and the introduced volume.

$${m} = {\rho}{V}$$,

where $m$ is the mass, $\rho$ is the density and ${V}$ is the volume of the gas. As the volume ${V}$ is fixed, only density $\rho$ of the air can be modified to vary air mass. The density of the air depends on the relative humidity, altitude, pressure drop and temperature.

$\rho_{\,\mathrm{humid~air}} = \frac{p_{d}}{R_{d} T} + \frac{p_{v}}{R_{v} T} = \frac{p_{d}M_{d}+p_{v}M_{v}}{R T} \,$

where:

$\rho_{\,\mathrm{humid~air}} =$ Density of the humid air (kg/m³)
$p_{d} =$ Partial pressure of dry air (Pa)
$R_{d} =$ Specific gas constant for dry air, 287.058 J/(kg·K)
$T =$ Temperature (K)
$p_{v} =$ Pressure of water vapor (Pa)
$R_{v} =$ Specific gas constant for water vapor, 461.495 J/(kg·K)
$M_{d} =$ Molar mass of dry air, 0.028964 (kg/mol)
$M_{v} =$ Molar mass of water vapor, 0.018016 (kg/mol)
$R =$ Universal gas constant, 8.314 J/(K·mol)

The performance of a gas turbine, its efficiency (heat rate) and the generated power output strongly depend on the climate conditions, which may decrease the output power ratings by up to 40%. To operate the turbine at ISO conditions and recover performance, several inlet air cooling systems have been promoted.

== Applied technologies ==
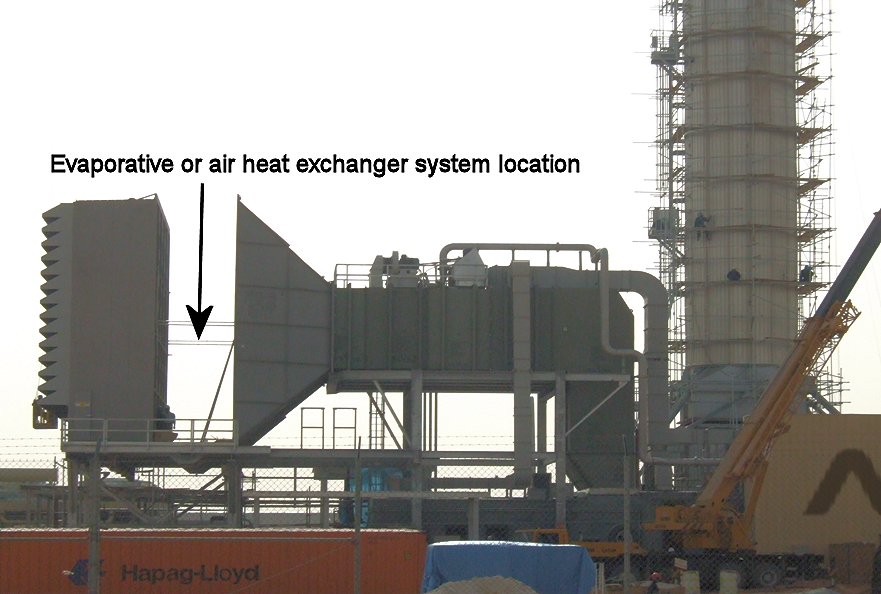
Filter-house modified to place the heat exchanger after the filtering stage.

Different technologies are available in the market. Each particular technology has its advantages and inconveniences according to different factors such as ambient conditions, investment cost and payback time, power output increase and cooling capacity.

=== Fogging ===
Inlet air fogging consists of spraying finely atomized water (fog) into the inlet airflow of a gas turbine engine. The water droplets evaporate quickly, which cools the air and increases the power output of the turbine.

Demineralized water is typically pressurized to 2000 psi (138 bar) then injected into the inlet air duct through an array of stainless steel fog nozzles. Demineralized water is used in order to prevent fouling of the compressor blades that would occur if water with mineral content were evaporated in the airflow. Fog systems typically produce a water spray, with about 90% of the water flow being in droplets that are 20 microns in diameter or smaller.

Inlet fogging has been in commercial use since the late 1980s and is a popular retrofit technology. As of 2015, there were more than 1000 inlet fog systems installed around the world. Inlet fog systems are, “simple, easy to install and operate” and less expensive than other power augmentation systems such as evaporative coolers and chillers.

Inlet fogging is the least expensive gas turbine inlet air cooling option and has low operating costs, particularly when one accounts for the fact that fog systems impose only a negligible pressure drop on the inlet airflow when compared to media-type evaporative coolers.

Fog nozzle manifolds are typically located in the inlet air duct just downstream of the final air filters but other locations can be desirable depending on the design of the inlet duct and the intended use of the fog system.

On a hot afternoon in a desert climate, it is possible to cool by as much as 40 °F (22.2 °C), while in a humid climate hot-afternoon cooling potential can be just 10 °F (5.6 °C) or less. Nevertheless, there are many successful inlet-fogging installations in humid climates such as Thailand, Malaysia and the American Gulf States.

Inlet fogging reduces emissions of Oxides of nitrogen (NOx) because the additional water vapor quenches hot spots in the combustors of the gas turbine.

==== Wet compression ====
Fog systems can be used to produce more power than can be obtained by evaporative cooling alone. This is accomplished by spraying more fog than is required to fully saturate the inlet air. The excess fog droplets are carried into the gas turbine compressor where they evaporate and produce an intercooling effect, which results in a further power boost. This technique was first employed on an experimental gas turbine in Norway in 1903. There are many successful systems in operation today.

Several gas turbine manufactures offer both fogging and wet compression systems. Systems are also available from third-party manufacturers.

=== Evaporative cooling ===
The evaporative cooler is a wetted rigid media where water is distributed throughout the header and where air passes through the wet porous surface. Part of the water is evaporated, absorbing the sensible heat from the air and increasing its relative humidity. The air dry-bulb temperature is decreased but the wet-bulb temperature is not affected. Similar to the fogging system, the theoretical limit is the wet bulb temperature, but performance of the evaporative cooler is usually around 80%. Water consumption is less than that of fogging cooling.

=== Vapour compression chiller ===
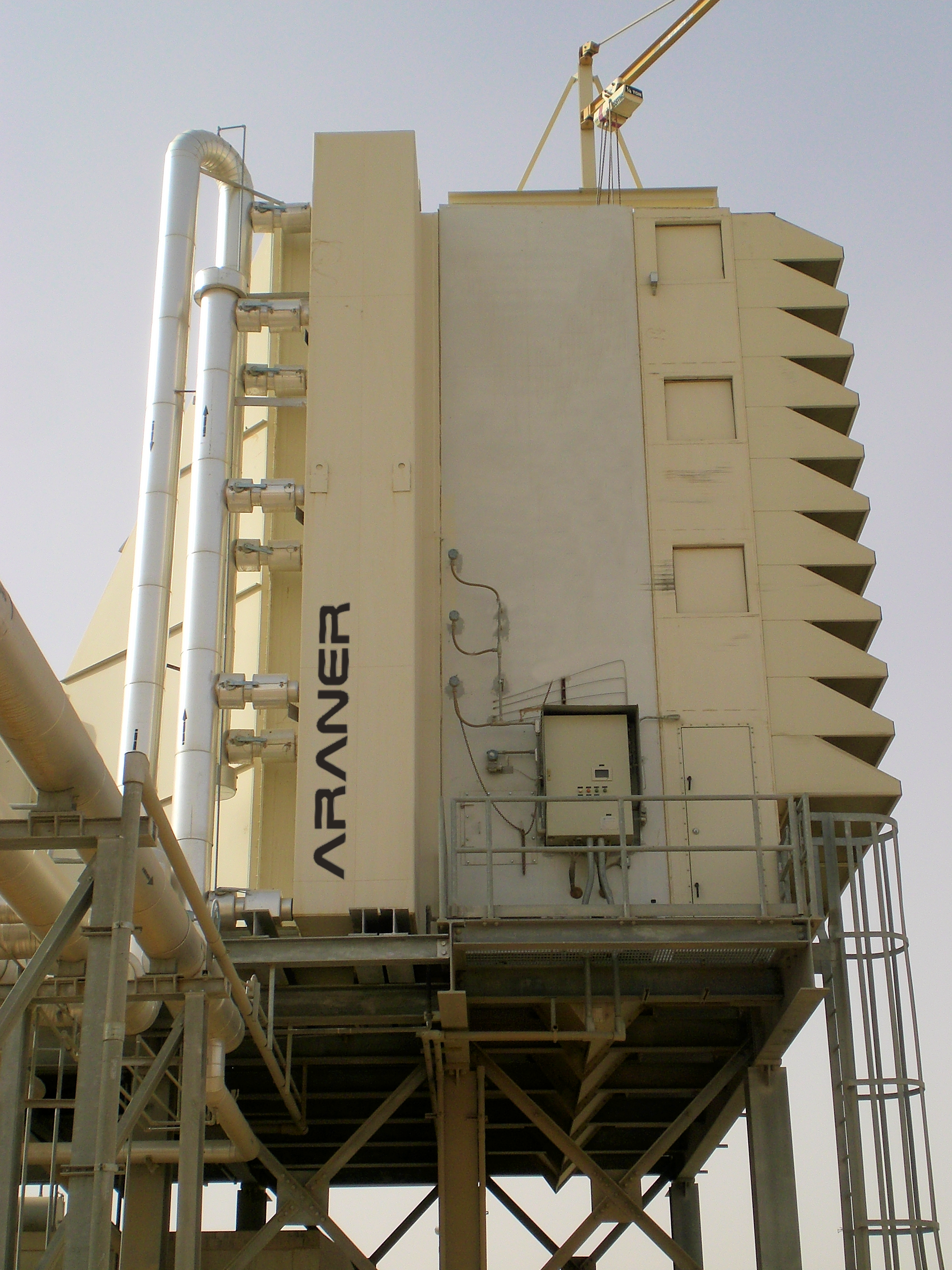
Turbine inlet air cooling filter-house modification to place the cooling coil coming from ammonia compression chiller plant

In a mechanical compression chiller technology, the coolant is circulated through a chilling coil heat exchanger that is inserted in the filter house, downstream from the filtering stage. Downstream from the coil, a droplet catcher is installed to collect moisture and water drops. The mechanical chiller can increase the turbine output and performance better than wetted technologies due to the fact that inlet air can be chilled below the wet bulb temperature, indifferent to the weather conditions. Compression chiller equipment has higher electricity consumption than evaporative systems. Initial capital cost is also higher, however turbine power augmentation and efficiency is maximized, and the extra-cost is amortized due to increased output power.

The majority of such systems involve more than one chiller unit and the configuration of the chillers can have a great bearing on the system parasitic power consumption. The series counterflow configuration can reduce the compressor work needed on each chiller, improving the overall chiller system by as much as 8%.

Other options such a steam driven compression are also used in industry.

=== Vapour-absorption chiller ===
In vapor-absorption chillers technology, thermal energy is used to produce cooling instead of mechanical energy. The heat source is usually leftover steam coming from combined cycle, and it is bypassed to drive the cooling system. Compared to mechanical chillers, absorption chillers have a low coefficient of performance, however, it should be taken into consideration that this chiller usually uses waste heat, which decreases the operational cost.

=== Combination with thermal energy storage ===
A thermal energy storage tank is a naturally stratified thermal accumulator that allows the storage of chilled water produced during off-peak time, to use this energy later during on-peak time to chill the turbine inlet air and increment its power output. A thermal energy storage tank reduces operational cost and refrigerant plant capacity. One advantage is the production of chilled water when demand is low, using the excess of power generation, which usually coincides with the night, when ambient temperature is low and chillers have better performance. Another advantage is the reduction of the chilling plant capacity and operational cost in comparison with an on-line chilling system, which produce delays during periods of low demand.

== Benefits ==
In areas where there is demand cooling, daily summer on-peak periods coincide with the highest atmospheric temperatures, which may reduce the efficiency and power gas turbines. With the vapor mechanical compression technologies, cooling can be used during these periods so that the performance and the power output of the turbine may be less affected by ambient conditions

Another benefit is the lower cost per extra inlet-cooling kilowatt compared to newly installed gas turbine kilowatt. Moreover, the extra inlet-cooling kilowatt uses less fuel than the new turbine kilowatt due to the lower heat-rate (higher efficiency) of the chilled turbine. Other benefits may include the incrementation of steam mass flow in a combined cycle, the reduction of turbine emissions (SOx, NO_{x}, CO_{2}), and increase in power-to-installed volume ratio.

Calculating the benefits of turbine air cooling requires a study to determine payback periods, taking into consideration several aspects like ambient conditions, cost of water, hourly electric demand values, cost of fuel.

== See also ==
- Psychrometrics
- Load duration curve
- Thermal energy storage
- Vapor-compression refrigeration
- Demand response
- Heat recovery steam generator
- Absorption refrigeration
- Water injection (engine)
