= Economy of Iran =

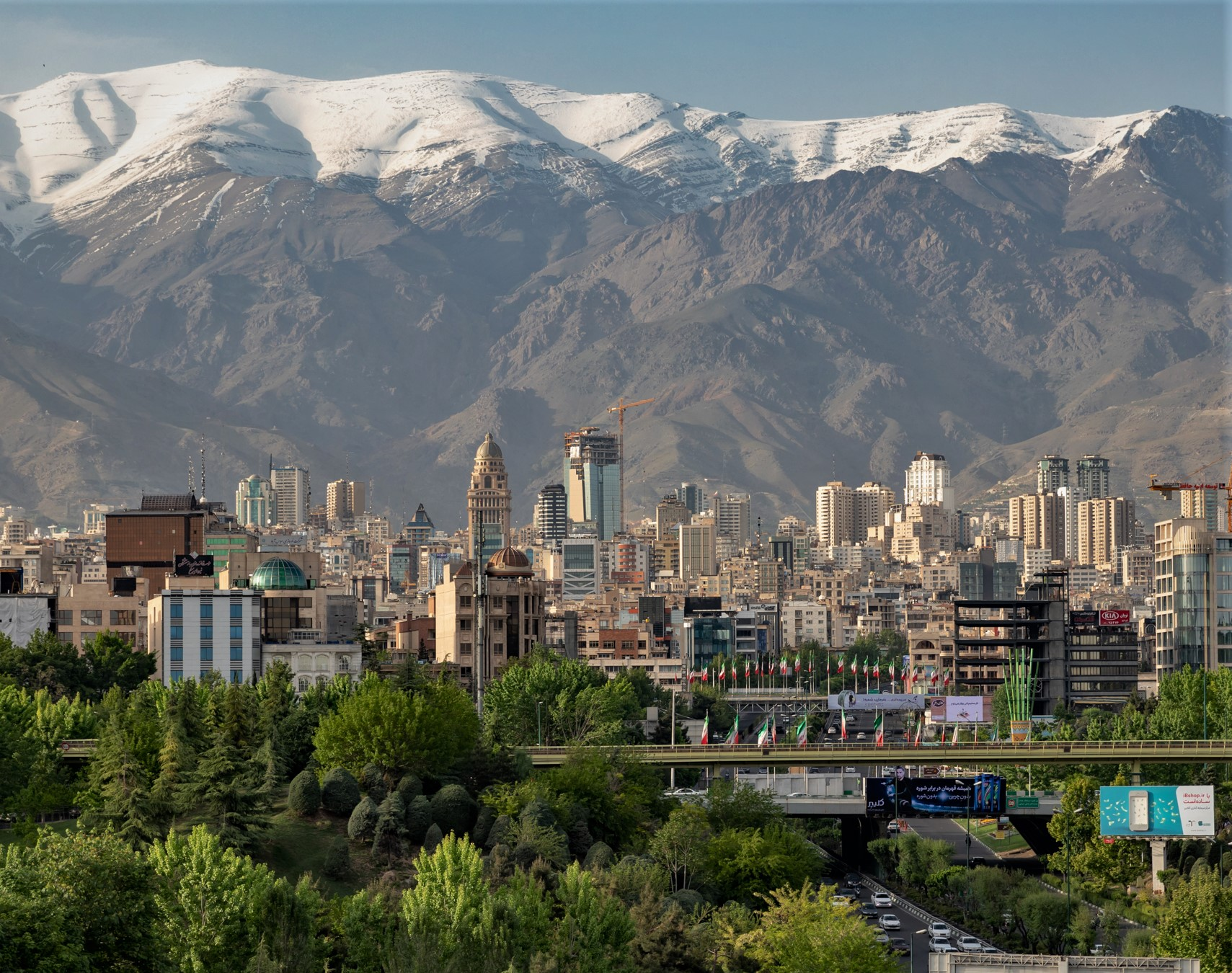
- Tehran, the economic capital and financial centre of Iran
- Currency: Iranian rial (IRR, ﷼), Iranian Toman (IRT,تومان) (unofficial)
- Fiscal year: March 21–20
- Trade organizations: ECO, OPEC, GECF, WTO (observer), SCO, BRICS and others
- Country group: Developing/Emerging; Upper-middle income economy

Statistics
- Population: ▲92,400,000 (2025)
- GDP: ▼$311.95 billion (nominal; 2026); ▲$1.78 trillion (PPP; 2026)
- GDP rank: 56th (nominal; 2026); 27th (PPP; 2026)
- GDP growth: ▼0.3% (2025)
- GDP per capita: ▼$3,376 (nominal; 2026); ▲$21,888 (PPP; 2026)
- GDP per capita rank: 134th (nominal; 2025); 88th (PPP; 2025)
- GDP per capita growth: ▼ -3.7% (2025)
- GDP by sector: Agriculture: 6.9% (2016 est.); Industry: 35.3% (2016 est.); Services: 55% (2017 est.)
- GDP by component: Household consumption: 49.7%; Government consumption: 14%; Investment in fixed capital: 20.6%; Investment in inventories: 14.5%; Exports of goods and services: 26%; Imports of goods and services: −24.9%; (2017 est.)
- Inflation (CPI): ▲40% (2026)
- Base borrowing rate: NA
- Population below national poverty line: 55% living on less than 3.4 million tomans/month (2019; per Majlis Research Center); ▼22% on less than $6.85/day (2022)
- Gini coefficient: ▼38.8 medium (2018)
- Human Development Index: ▲0.799 high (2023) (78th); ▲0.584 medium IHDI (2022)
- Corruption Perceptions Index: ▼24 out of 100 points (2023, 149th rank)
- Labor force: ▲27,358,987 (2019); ▲39.1% employment rate (2018)
- Unemployment: ▲8.90% (2021)
- Youth unemployment: ▲21.9% (2025)
- Average net salary: Urban households: IRT 17 million, monthly (FY 2013); Rural households: IRT 10 million, monthly (FY 2013)
- Gross savings: 41.758% of GDP (2022)
- Main industries: petroleum, petrochemicals, fertilizers, horticulture, car manufacture, parts, pharmaceuticals, home appliances, electronics, telecommunications, energy, power, caustic soda, textiles, construction, cement and other construction materials, food processing (particularly sugar refining and vegetable oil production), ferrous and non-ferrous metal fabrication, armaments

External
- Exports: ▼$107.43 billion (2018)
- Export goods: petroleum (56%), chemical and petrochemical products, automobiles, fruits and nuts, carpets
- Main export partners: China 36%; Turkey 20.21%; Pakistan 10.7%; UAE 10.5%(2024); India 4.5%; Azerbaijan 2.8%; Germany 1.8%; (2024)
- Imports: ▲$54.46 billion (2018)
- Import goods: industrial raw materials and intermediate goods (46%), capital goods (35%), foodstuffs and other consumer goods (19%), technical services
- Main import partners: China 28.4% (2025); Brazil 12.9%; Turkey 11.7%; UAE 10.5% (2025); India 10.5%; Germany 4.9%; Italy 1.7%; France 1.7% (2022)
- FDI stock: Domestic: ▲$50.33 billion (2017); Abroad: ▲$5.22 billion (2017)
- Current account: ▲$32.031 billion (2022); ▲1.62% of GDP (2022)
- Gross external debt: ▼$9.142 billion (2022)

Public finance
- Government debt: ▼IRR 34,091,132 billion (2022); ▼34.17% of GDP (2022)
- Foreign reserves: ▼$85.2 billion (2020, est.)
- Budget balance: +3% (of GDP) (2022 est.)
- Revenue: IRR 8,298,940 billion (2022)
- Spending: IRR 12,487,173 billion (2022)
- Credit rating: CCC (Sovereign risk); CCC (Currency risk); CC (Bank sector risk); CC (Political risk); B (Economic structure risk); CC (Country risk); (2014)
- All values, unless otherwise stated, are in US dollars.

Iran has a developing mixed economy that is centrally planned through its large public sector. With a population of over 90 million, the Iranian economy is supported by an industrial manufacturing base, a subsidized oil and gas sector, and abundant natural resources. Its energy sector is home to 10% of the world's proven oil reserves and 15% of the world's gas reserves, often projecting Iran as an "energy superpower".

Since the 1979 Islamic revolution, the Iranian economy has experienced slower economic growth, high inflation, and recurring crises. A variety of armed conflicts in the region have exacerbated economic pressures from the 1980s to the 2020s. The nation has experienced varied levels of "brain drain" due to Iranians seeking overseas employment or immigration. Inflation in Iran has been persistent and caused mass protests.

The nation's nuclear program and foreign policy have placed Iran under sustained international sanctions, deterring foreign and domestic investment with adverse humanitarian impact. The periodic lifting of these sanctions have supported an emerging tourism industry. Its official currency, the Iranian rial, has fallen significantly since the 2010s, leading to mass protests over its purchasing power. Iran maintains low international rankings on economic freedom and "ease of doing business".

== History until 1979 ==
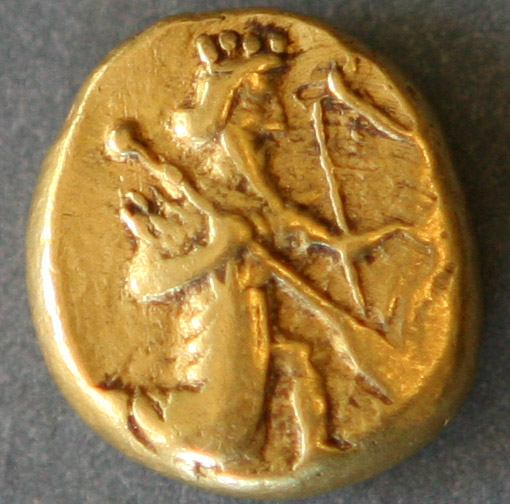
Persian Achaemenid gold coin, circa 490 BC

In 546 BC, Croesus of Lydia was defeated and captured by the Persians, who then adopted gold as the main metal for their coins. There are accounts in the biblical Book of Esther of dispatches being sent from Susa to provinces as far out as India and the Kingdom of Kush during the reign of Xerxes the Great (485–465 BC). By the time of Herodotus (c. 475 BC), the Royal Road of the Persian Empire ran some 2,857 km from the city of Susa on the Karun (250 km east of the Tigris) to the port of Smyrna (modern İzmir in Turkey) on the Aegean Sea.

Modern agriculture in Iran dates back to the 1850s when Amir Kabir undertook a number of changes to the traditional agricultural system. Such changes included importing modified seeds and signing collaboration contracts with other countries. Polyakov's Bank Esteqrazi was bought in 1898 by the Tsarist government of Russia, and later passed into the hands of the Iranian government by a contract in 1920. The bank continued its activities under the name of Bank Iran until 1933 when incorporating the newly founded Keshavarzi Bank.

The Imperial Bank of Persia was established in 1885, with offices in all major cities of Persia. Reza Shah Pahlavi (r. 1925–41) improved the country's overall infrastructure, implemented educational reform, campaigned against foreign influence, reformed the legal system, and introduced modern industries. During this time, Iran experienced a period of social change, economic development, and relative political stability.

Reza Shah Pahlavi, who abdicated in 1941, was succeeded by his son, Mohammad Reza Shah Pahlavi (r. 1941–79). No fundamental change occurred in the economy of Iran during World War II and the years immediately following. Between 1954 and 1960 a rapid increase in oil revenues and sustained foreign aid led to greater investment and fast-paced economic growth, primarily in the government sector. Subsequently, inflation increased, the value of the national currency, the rial, depreciated, and a foreign-trade deficit developed. Economic policies implemented to combat these problems led to declines in the rates of nominal economic growth and per capita income by 1961.

== History since the 1979 Islamic revolution ==
Prior to 1979, Iran developed rapidly, as surging global oil revenues in the 1970s flooded the country with capital, with rapid GDP and per-capita income expansion. Traditionally agricultural, by the 1970s, the country had undergone significant industrialization and modernization. The pace slowed by 1978 as capital flight reached $30 to $40 billion 1980-US dollars just before the revolution. Furthermore, economic prosperity heavily favored urban elites, leaving many rural and traditional communities marginalized. The Shah's earlier land reforms upended traditional rural economies and forced massive, unplanned migration to the cities, forcing migrants into settlements without water or electricity. These deeply religious rural migrants faced extreme poverty while living right next to the wealthy, Westernized elite. Known as the Mostazafin (the oppressed), the marginalized population became the muscle of the street protests against the monarchy, mobilized by the Islamic clergy's promises of social justice.

Following the revolution, subsequent nationalizations of industries in 1979 and the outbreak of the Iran–Iraq War, over 80% of the economy came under government control. The eight-year war with Iraq claimed at least 300,000 Iranian lives and injured more than 500,000. The cost of the war to Iran's economy was some $500 billion.

After hostilities ceased in 1988, the government tried to develop the country's communications, transportation, manufacturing, health care, education and energy sectors, including its prospective nuclear power facilities, and began integrating its communication and transportation systems with those of neighboring states.

The government's long-term objectives since the revolution were stated as economic independence, full employment, and a comfortable standard of living but Iran's population had more than doubled between 1980 and 2000 and its median age declined. Although many Iranians are farmers, agricultural production has consistently fallen since the 1960s. By the late 1990s, Iran imported much of its food. At that time, economic hardship in the countryside resulted in many people moving to cities.

Following the war, the reformist Akbar Hashemi Rafsanjani's administration advocated a fundamental reorientation and liberalization of Iran's economy, along with efforts to reverse Iran's international isolation. Rafsanjani's agenda included infrastructure development, the privatization of state enterprises, foreign exchange liberalization, the establishment of free-trade zones and the elimination of subsidies and price controls. However, this upward trajectory was derailed by domestic political friction and economic policy errors. Uncontrolled government spending and heightened consumer demand triggered severe inflation, sparking riots across multiple Iranian cities in 1992 and 1994. Fearing instability, domestic private entities resisted investing, while international partners were driven away by political volatility and tightened U.S. sanctions implemented after 1995. Simultaneously, weak global oil prices in the early 1990s sparked a major currency and debt crisis. In response, Rafsanjani froze infrastructure projects, reinstated foreign exchange controls, rescheduled foreign debts and abandoned plans to reform state subsidies. Politically, Rafsanjani faced heavy domestic resistance as Islamic leftists committed to state-controlled economics initially blocked his free-market initiatives while traditional conservatives sabotaged his second term by fighting his attempts to loosen Islamic social and cultural laws.

The 1997 election of Mohammad Khatami sparked a reform movement by Islamic leftists that ultimately failed to restructure the nation's power dynamics. From its inception, the movement prioritized social, cultural, and political changes with their approach heavily shaped by their deep-seated distrust of the free market and frustration with the corruption and repression of the Rafsanjani administration. Furthermore, fears arose among leftists on the chaotic nature of economic deregulation that could erode the public support for reforms.

During his presidency, Khatami achieved a solid ground in implementing serious economic restructuring. Among his accomplishments was unifying the official exchange rate with the parallel exchange rate, establishing an Oil Stabilization Fund as a cushion against market volatility, authorizing the first post-revolutionary private banks, pushing through some improvements to foreign investment frameworks, stewarding the economy through a tumultuous period of unprecedented low oil revenues and luring new interest and investment from the Western world.

However, more ambitious plans, including efforts to reduce the costly energy subsidies was met by opposition from conservative parliamentarians as they adopted obstructionist approach to Khatami's economic agenda, as means of subverting his political and cultural reforms. Khatami also found himself confronted with the onset of a global recession in the early 2000s, a deep slump in oil prices, persistent inflation, unemployment and economic mismanagement while his response was a typically cautious array of small-scale economic initiatives that bore little results.

The election of Mahmoud Ahmadinejad brought about economic promises with populist appeal, having pledged to the re-distribution of oil revenues during the 2000s commodities boom, which sustained illusory growth rates and brought an epic influx of revenues and foreign exchange. The rise of Asia as a commercial counterweight to Iran's historic trade partners in Europe, enabled Tehran to blunt the impact of sanctions. After the United Arab Emirates, China became the largest source of Iran's imports, and Asian states purchased more Iranian oil than any other region. Ahmadinejad took an assertive and problematic role on policy by expanding credit and spending in a freewheeling fashion, feuding openly with Central Bank chiefs, dismantling the bureaucracy, disempowering government technocrats and reveling in the reverberations of the global economic meltdown in 2008. His provocative rhetoric on Israel and Iran's continuing defiance of U.N. Security Council resolutions on its nuclear program heightened the sense of political risk and persuaded foreign investors to leave voluntarily.

Ahmadinejad also move boldly against the longstanding distortions plaguing Iran's economy, such as subsidies and state dominance, but in a counterproductive way. Privatization benefited mainly state-affiliated companies, particularly those associated with the Islamic Revolutionary Guards, whose retirement funds took a majority stake in the state telecommunications firm in 2009. Ahmadinejad's assiduous use of economic issues made him especially vulnerable, especially after mood inside Iran soured as the global economic slowdown in 2009 began to impact Iran and the price of oil crashed to less than one-third of its 2008 high. Senior political figures and renowned economists were also sharply critical of Ahmadinejad's spending and interventionist approach, while strikes by bazaaris in 2008 and 2010 forced the government to delay or abandon planned tax hikes.

In 2007 the Iranian subsidy reform plan introduced price controls and subsidies particularly on food and energy. Contraband, administrative controls, widespread corruption, and other restrictive factors undermine private sector-led growth. The government's 20-year vision involved market-based reforms reflected in a five-year development plan, 2016 to 2021, focusing on "a resilient economy" and "progress in science and technology". Most of Iran's exports are oil and gas, accounting for a majority of government revenue in 2010. In March 2022, the Iranian parliament under the then new president Ebrahim Raisi decided to eliminate a major subsidy for importing food, medicines and animal feed, valued at $15 billion in 2021. Also in March 2022, 20 billion tons of basic goods exports from Russia including vegetable oil, wheat, barley and corn were agreed.

Due to its relative isolation from global financial markets, Iran was initially able to avoid recession in the aftermath of the 2008 global financial crisis. However, following expansion of international sanctions related to Iran's nuclear program, the Iranian rial fell to a record low of 23,900 to the US dollar in September 2012.

2025 was marked by a collapsing currency, surging inflation causing widespread unrest. The Iranian rial plummeted to record lows, trading well above one million rials to the U.S. dollar, contributing to inflation rates exceeding 40% and sharply rising prices for basic commodities, causing hardships and nationwide protests. By December 2025, the rial weakened to roughly 1.3–1.5 million per U.S. dollar on open markets, imposing heavy pressure on domestic prices and living standards. Inflation surged with annual inflation in 2025 reaching or exceeding the 40% range, with food and essential goods prices in some cases climbing by 50% or more.

In late December 2025, the government replaced the head of the Central Bank of Iran in an attempt to steady the economy. By early 2026, the crisis had contributed to significant social strain. Official data for January 2026 indicated monthly inflation around 8% overall and nearly 14% for food and beverages. Food inflation alone approached roughly 90% year-on-year. Annual inflation also rose further to about 44.6% in January 2026.

The Twelve-Day War with Israel in June 2025 had a profound short-term impact on Iran's economy. The economic toll was significant: Iran's oil exports plunged by 94% during the war, dropping from about 1.7 million barrels per day to barely 100,000, due to damage and fear of tanker transit in the Persian Gulf. On the other side, Israeli and U.S. strikes caused billions in physical damage: dozens of military facilities, communication centers, and at least 120 residential buildings in Tehran were destroyed or severely damaged. After 12 days, Iran agreed to a ceasefire; an Iranian MP on parliament's economic commission admitted Iran's economy "lacks the resilience for a decisive battle" and that the financial strain was a key reason Iran could not prolong the war. The war's aftermath brought even tighter U.S. sanctions. Enforcement on oil smuggling was intensified by Western navies. The currency, which had plunged during the conflict, remained very weak (around 1.3 million rials per USD by mid-late 2025).

The Provinces of Iran by their contribution to national GDP, 2014

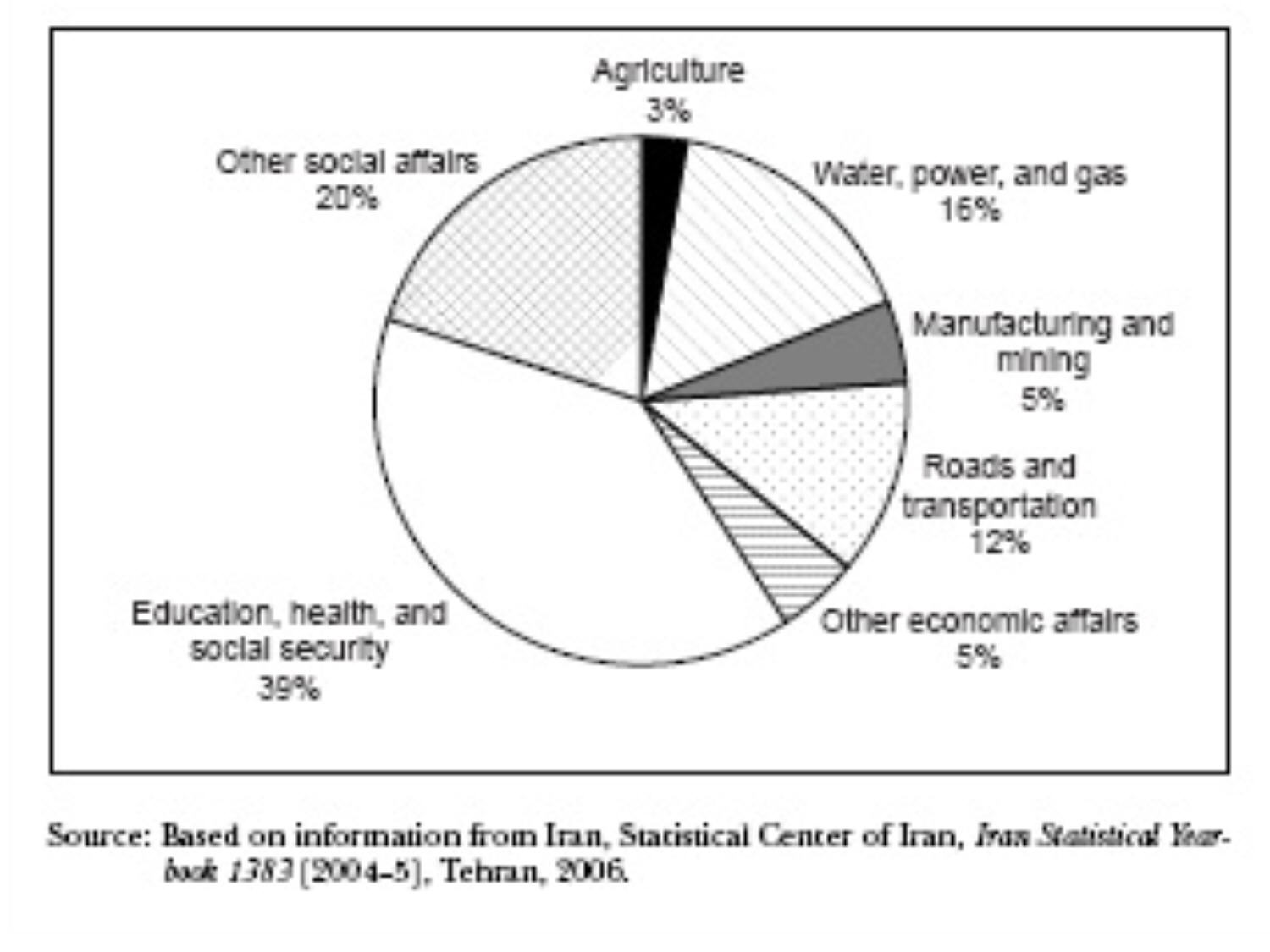
Socioeconomic expenditures, 2004

Historical GDP per capita development in Iran, 1820–2018

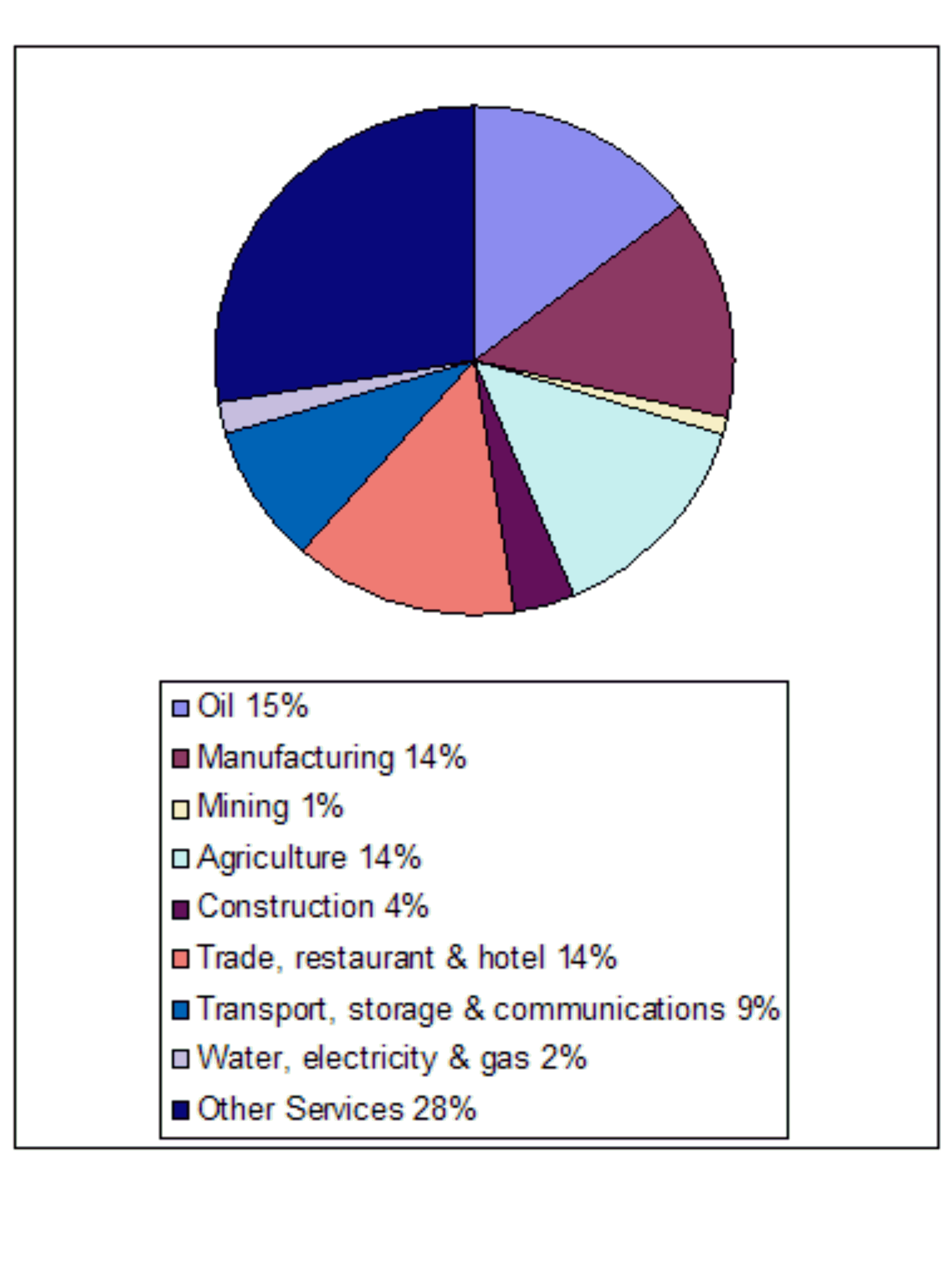
Economic sectors, 2002

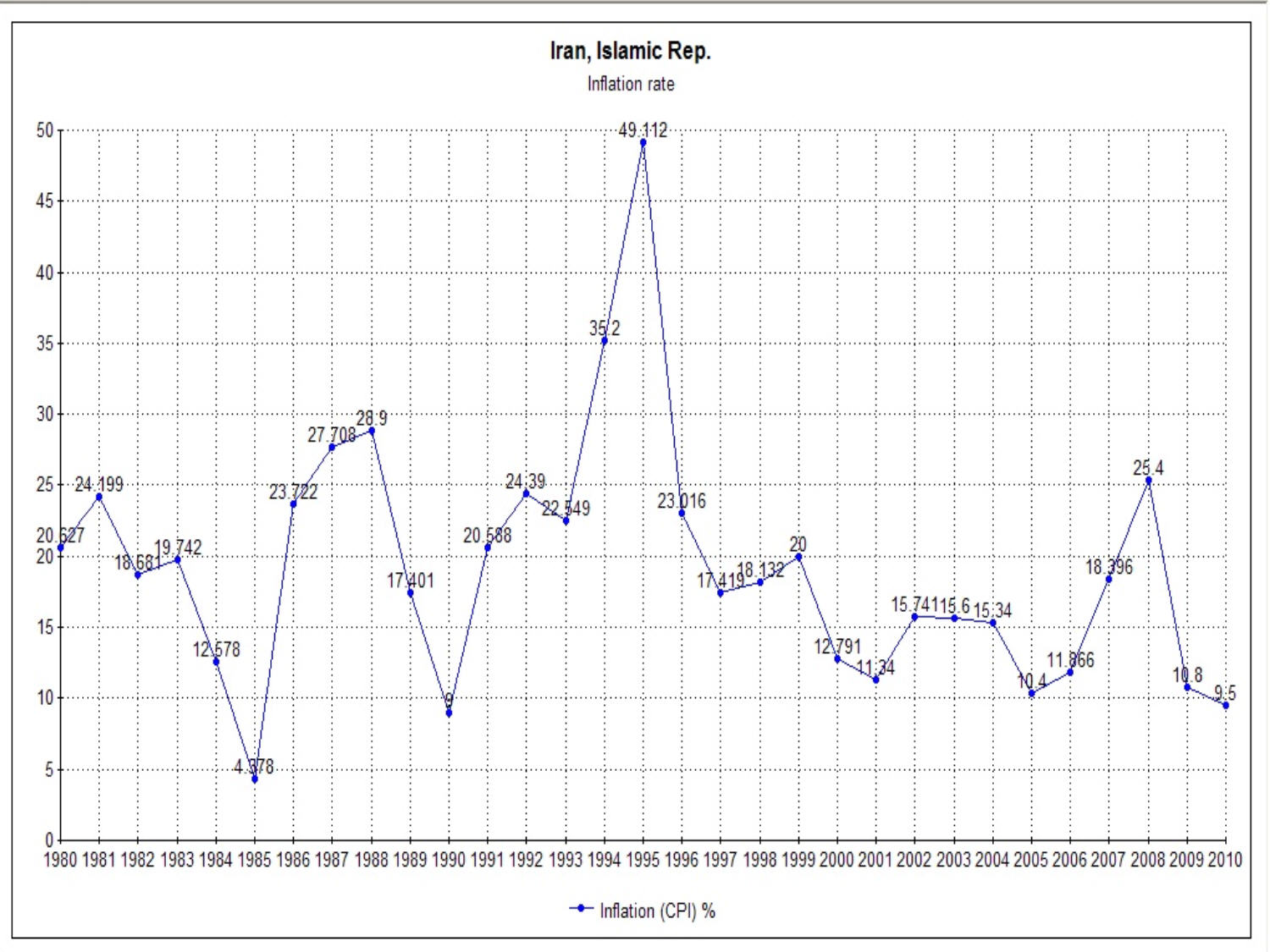
Inflation rate, 1980–2010

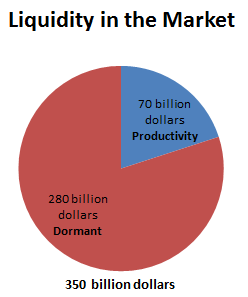
Market liquidity, 2012

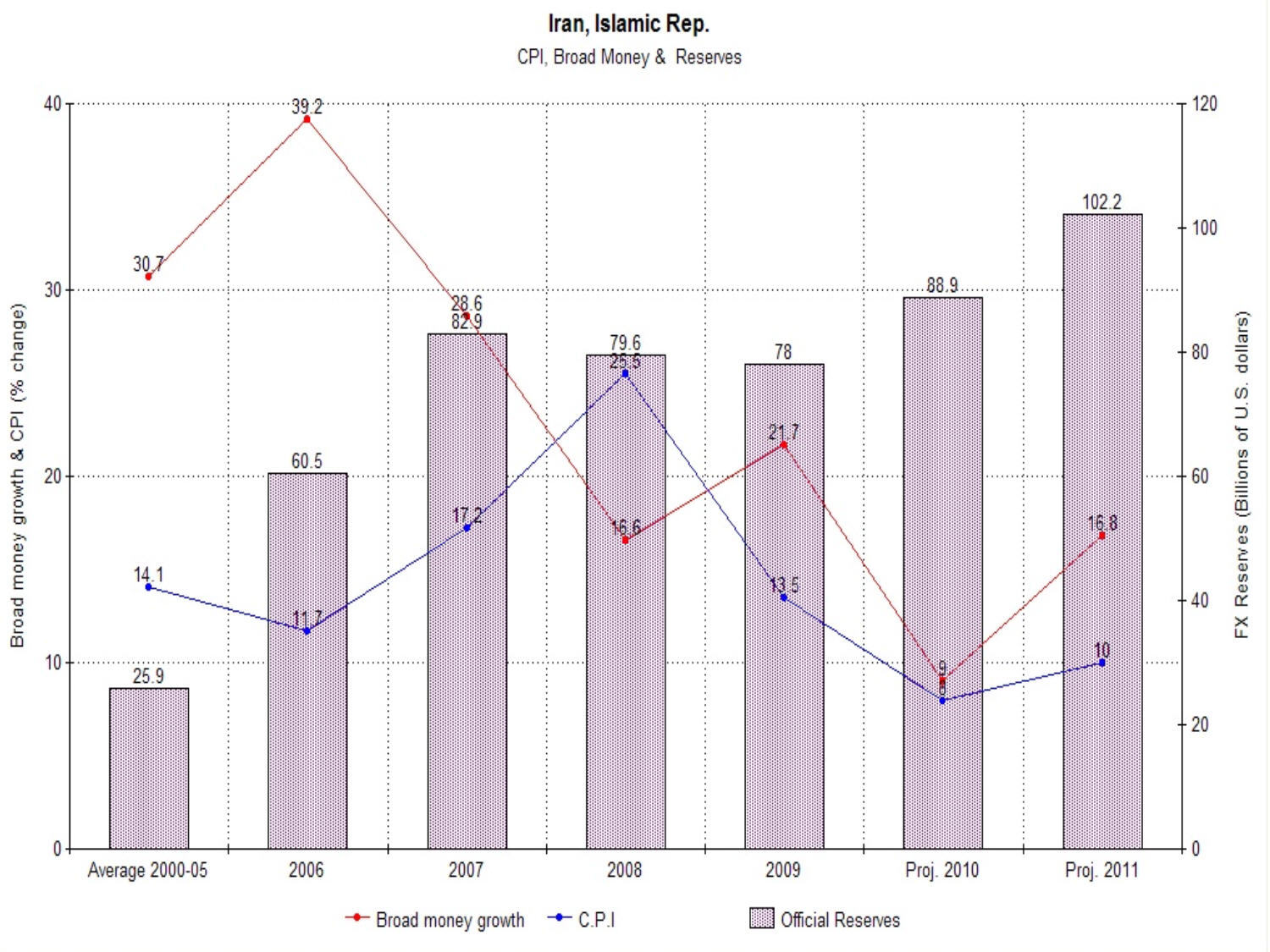
CPI, broad money and foreign exchange reserves, 2000–2011

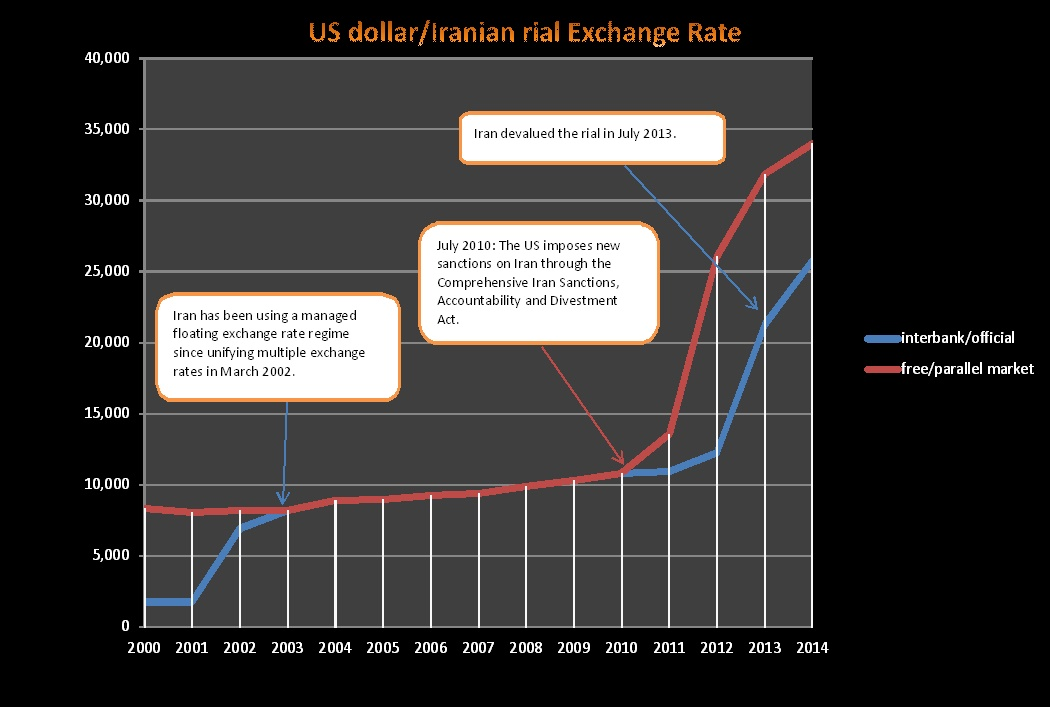
US dollar/Iranian rial exchange rate, 2003–2014 est.

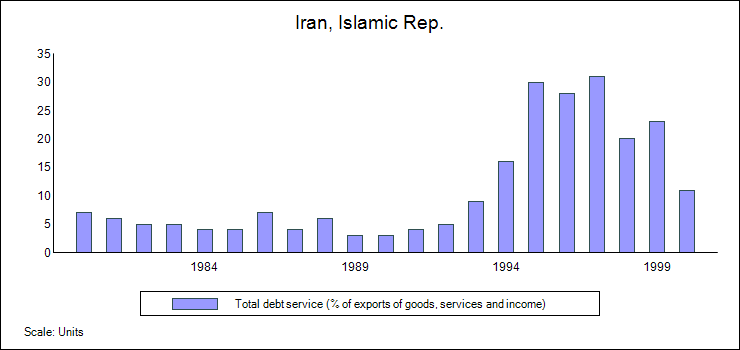
Debt service, 1980–2000

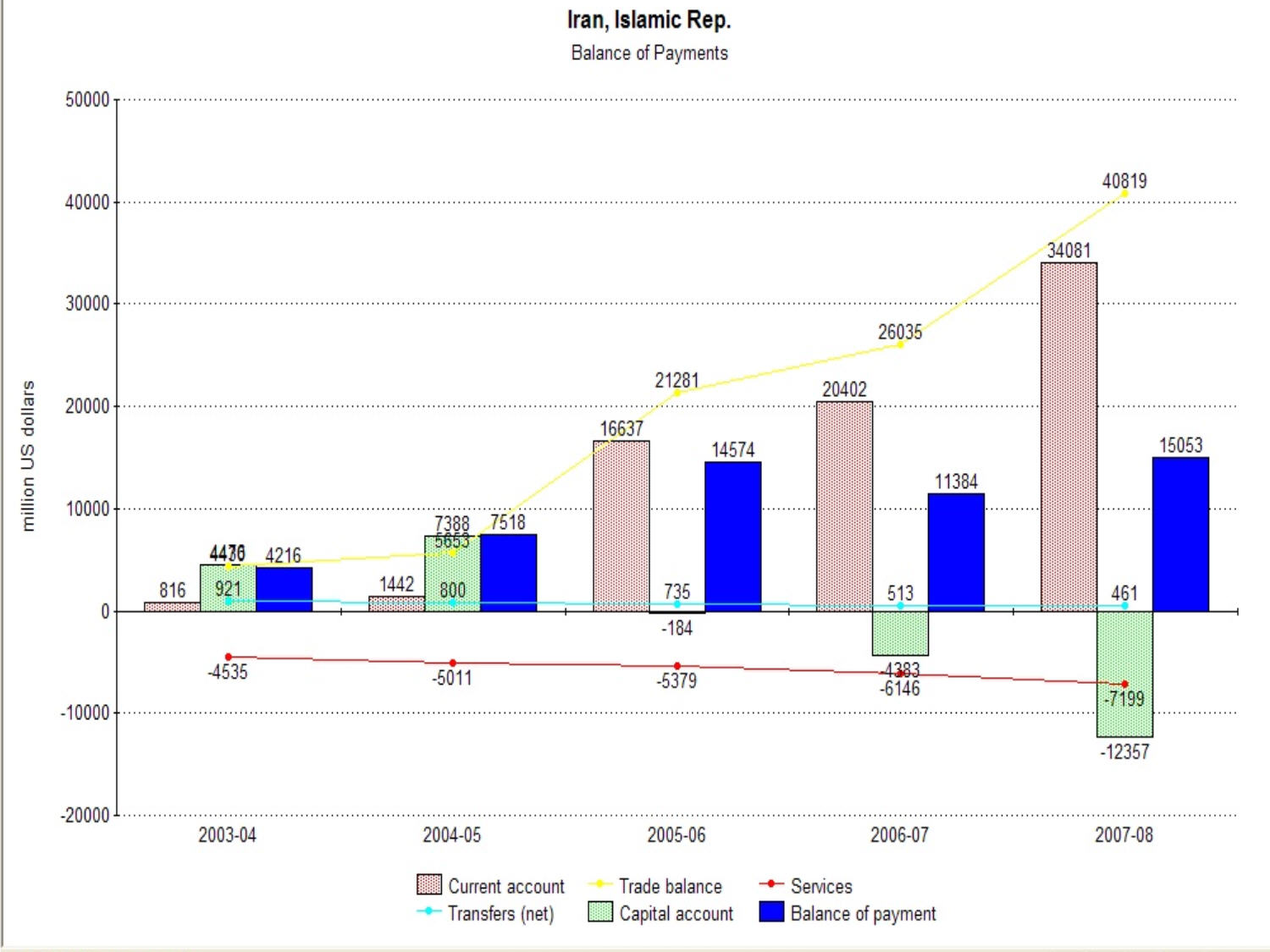
Balance of payment, 2003–2007

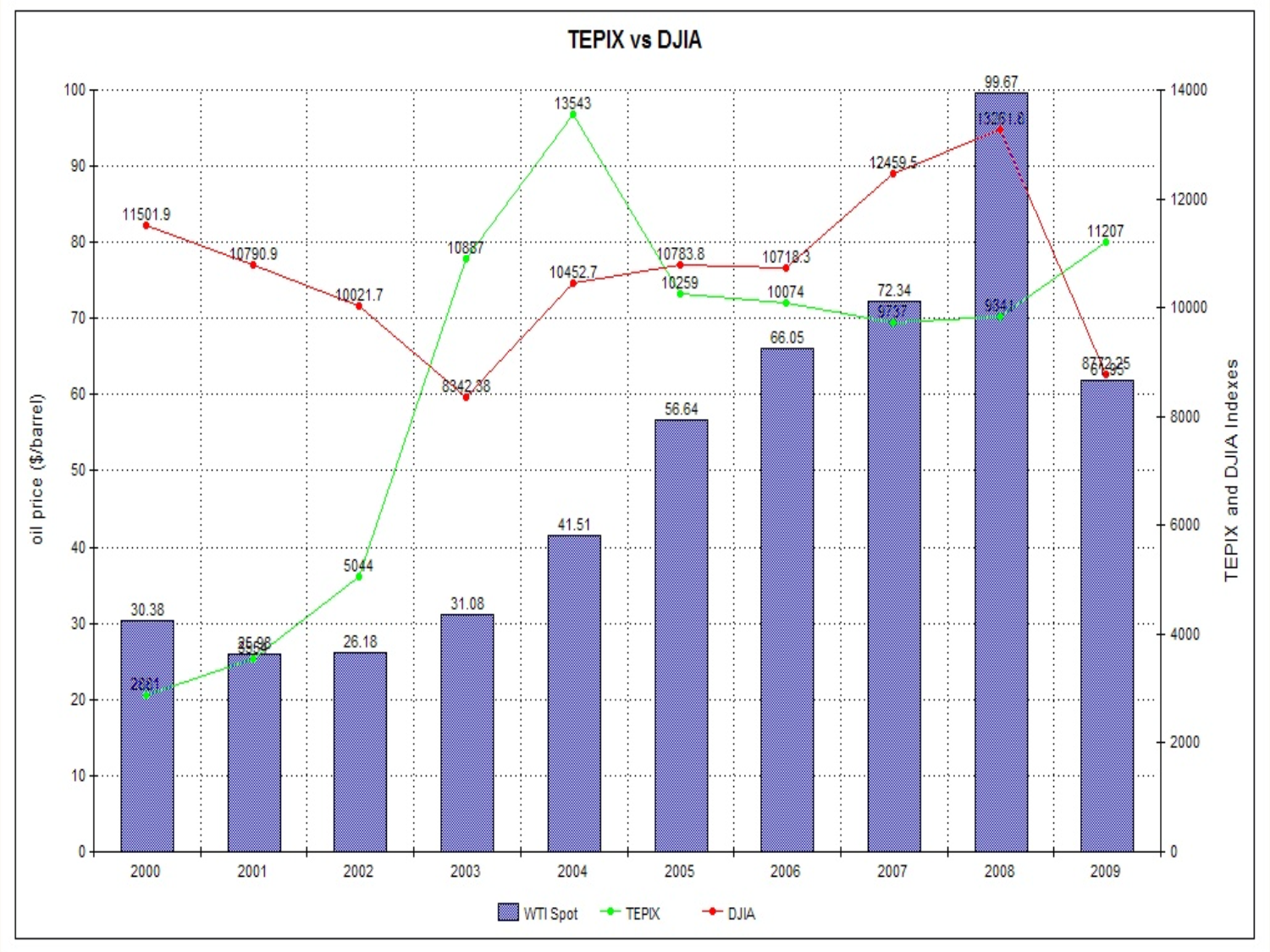
TEPIX vs DJIA and oil prices, 2000–2009

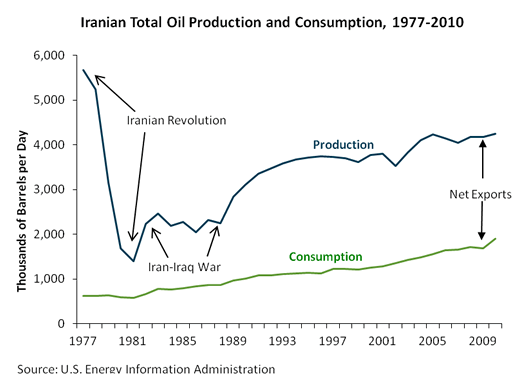
Oil production and consumption, 1977–2010

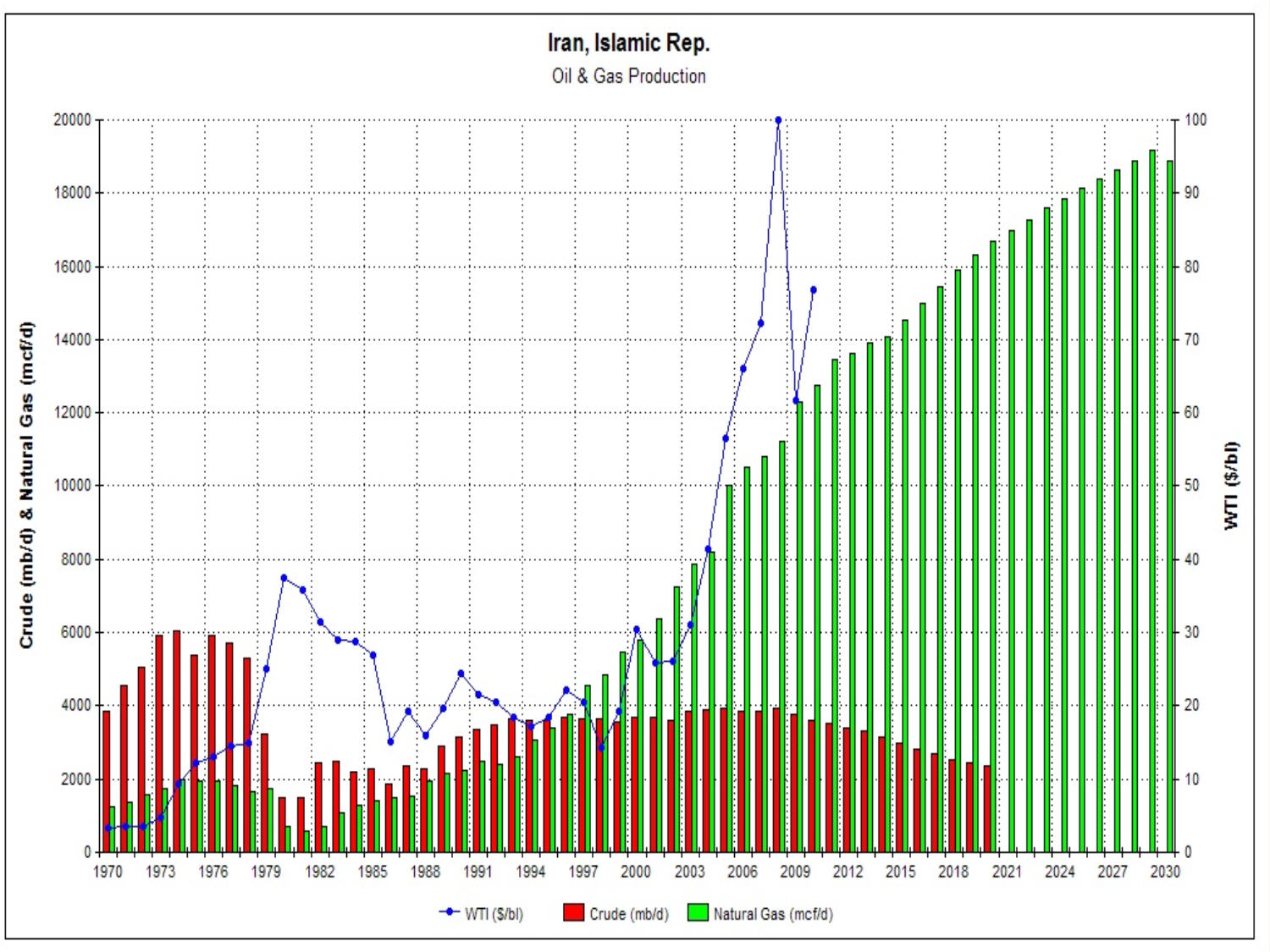
Oil and gas production, 1970–2030 est.

== Economic crisis ==
=== 2026 blackout in Iran ===
On 8 January 2026, the twelfth day of the 2025–2026 protests in Iran, Iranian authorities imposed an internet blackout. Reports from Iran described widespread telephone and internet blackouts in Tehran, with additional disruptions reported in Isfahan, Lordegan, Abdanan, parts of Shiraz, and Kermanshah. Cybersecurity experts reported that Iran's National Information Network was also fully disconnected, even internally within Iran.

Although the blackout had been relaxed on 28 January, severe restrictions are still in place. The Iranian Minister of Communications, Sattar Hashemi, acknowledged that the shutdown was costing the economy $35.7 million a day. In April, Afshin Kolahi estimated that the direct cost of the shutdown was between $30–40 million per day, and that adding indirect costs makes the true impact closer to $70–80 million per day. Online sales fell by 80% during the Internet shutdown, while the Tehran Stock Exchange overall index lost 450,000 points over a four-day period, and 130 trillion tomans daily. In January 2026, the number of financial transactions in Iran had dropped by 185 million.

The Internet blackout, which initially did not affect satellite internet connections like Starlink, has increased efforts to shut down the Starlink internet, alongside operations to seize satellite dishes to hinder access to the Internet. The Internet blackout has been described by human rights organisations as an attempt by the government to cover up the 2026 Iran massacres.

As of 16 February, internet traffic levels in Iran were reduced by 50%. In February 2026, internet prices increased by 18%, bringing the total increase to 52%.

Following the 28 February Israeli–United States strikes on Iran, there was a renewed "near total" internet blackout in Iran, as NetBlocks reported internet connectivity in Iran dropping to 4% of ordinary levels. Iranians abroad have also reported that they have been unable to connect with family members in Iran or access the Iranian intranet. As of 6 March, internet traffic was measured at about 1% of normal connectivity.

By 21 April 2026, the shutdown had entered is 53rd consecutive day (over 1,248 hours), making it the longest nationwide internet disruption recorded in any country. Authorities began restoring internet to "favoured groups", while most people remained disconnected. As of 16 April, it was estimated that the shutdown had cost the economy $1.8 billion. Internet connectivity remained at extremely limited levels, restricting access to independent information sources. On 12 April, an Iranian official said that there was no timeline for restoring the internet.

On 25 May, Pezeshkian gave an order to end the internet blackout, and it was partially restored, though service remained slow and with restrictions.

=== Rations ===
In November 18 2026 long queues were reported at Iranian bread stores after the Islamic regime secretly implemented a monthly quota is about 8 kg of flour per person at a subsidized rate of 2,300 tomans, with excess purchases charged at a free-market rate of 12,650 tomans.

=== Iranian energy crisis ===
Despite being a country with huge oil and gas reserves Iran suffers from a severe energy crisis. The Iranian energy crisis is a multifaceted problem that has been exacerbated by a combination of factors, including poor governance, international sanctions, and the dominance of industries under the Islamic Revolutionary Guard Corps (IRGC). As of November 2024 Iran faces its most severe energy crisis in decades, with frequent power outages and disruptions to natural gas supplies. The country's energy infrastructure is outdated and in disrepair, with many refineries and power plants operating below capacity. Iran's energy supply is unreliable, with frequent blackouts and shortages affecting daily life, industries, and essential services. The IRGC's control over key industries, including power generation and distribution, has hindered efficient management and strategic planning. The government's prioritization of political interests over efficient management and infrastructural development has exacerbated the crisis. A notable example is the extensive usage that the IRGC makes of electricity to mine cryptocurrency which "leaves Iran in the dark.

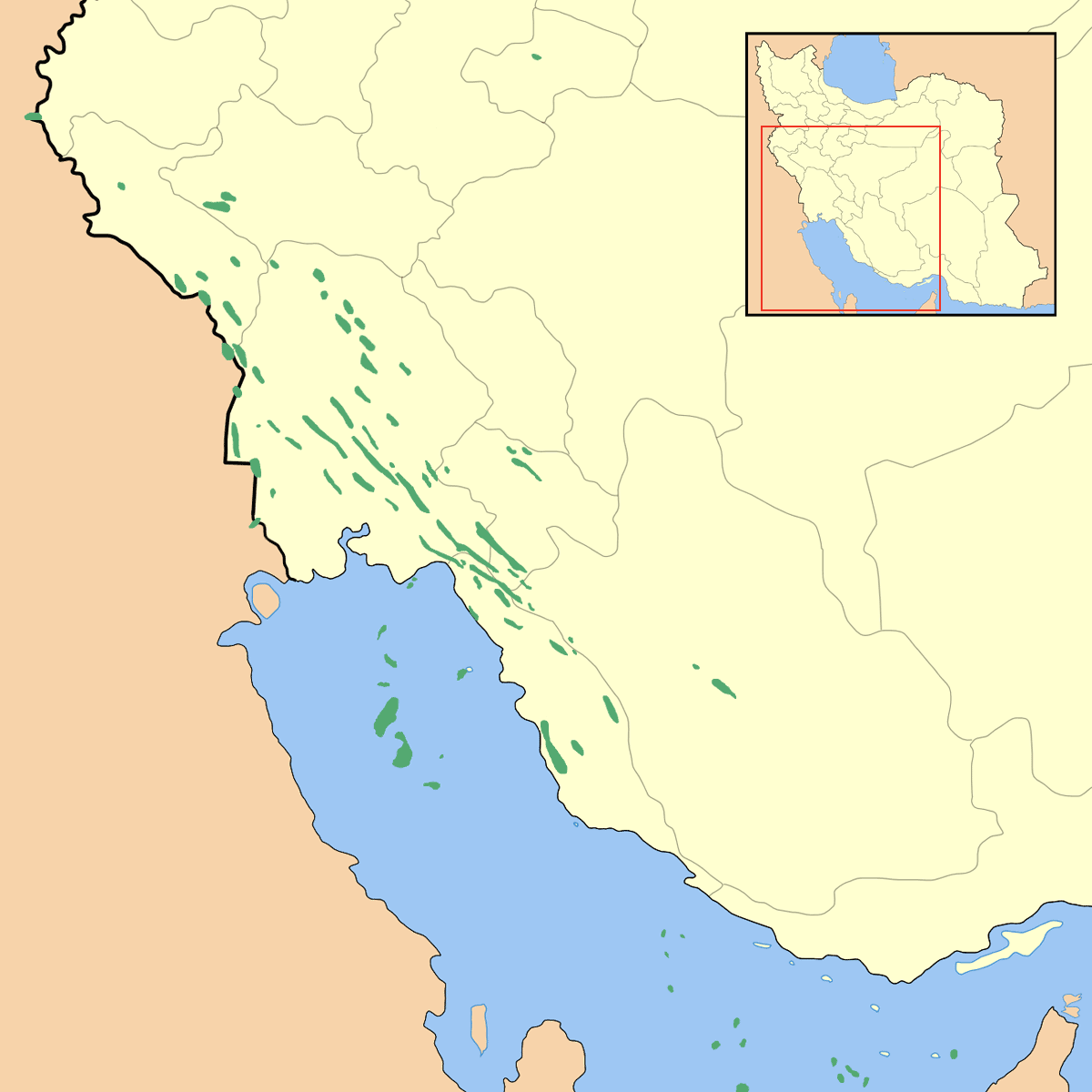
A map of Iranian oilfields

Despite ongoing power shortages, Iran continues to export electricity, with a surge of nearly 92% in the first four months of 2023 compared to the same period in 2022.

The crisis has put stop to 50% of industry.

In January and February 2025 constant global shutdowns were conducted with the schools as well as Iranian industries.

Since February 2025, Iran has been suffering from daily blackouts, each lasting for 3-4 hours.

The energy shortage does not equally affect all segments of the population. For example, in Tehran, northern neighbourhoods have been experiencing only 1% of outages while poorer southern districts endured 32%.

The dual crises conditions have led to dire food shortages and 2025 Iranian protests and mass transportations sector labor strikes.

In December 2025 Iran introduced imported water from northern neighboring countries and Afghanistan. It also established Strategic Energy Management Agency Organization. Ayatollah Ali Khamenei ordered people reducing consumption of food, bread, water, energy and fuel.

=== Iranian economic crisis ===
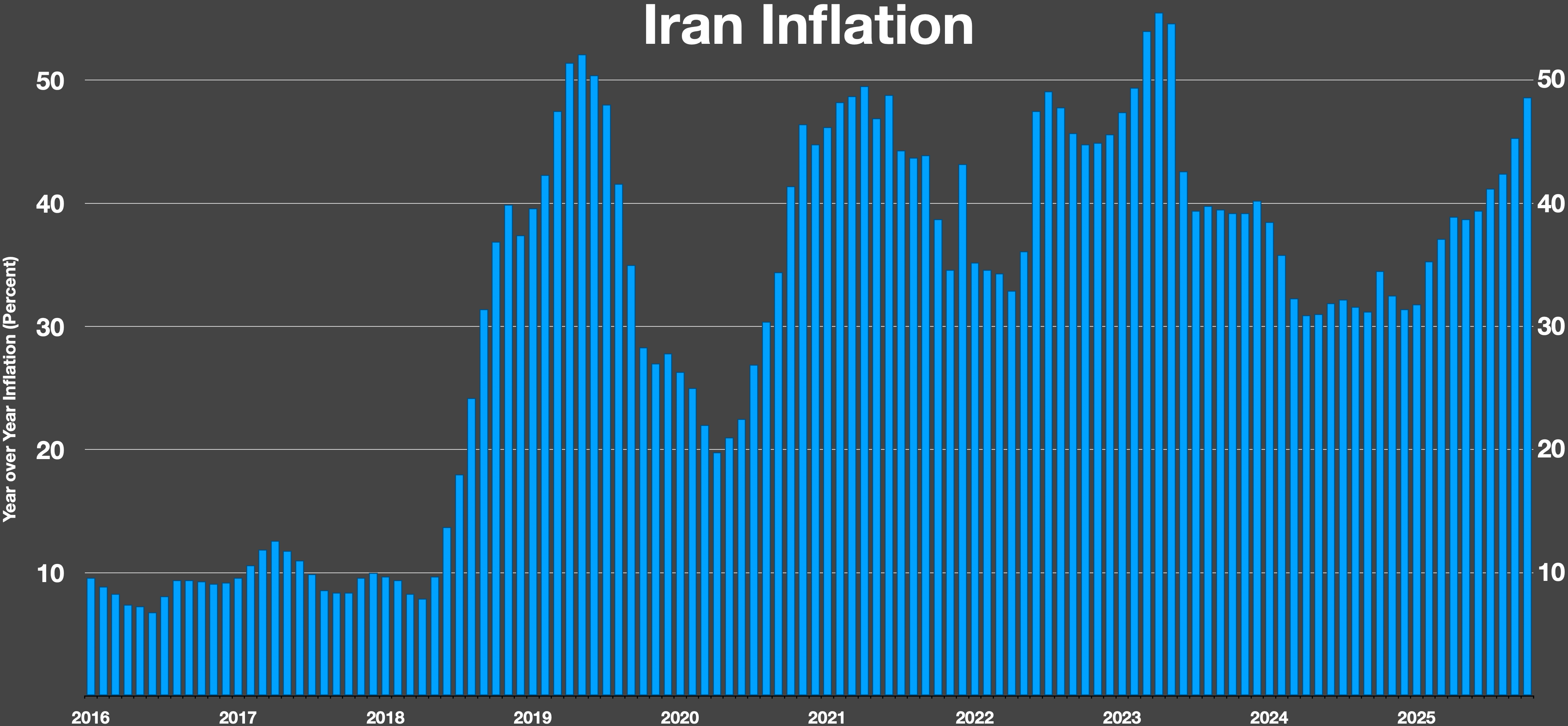
Inflation rate in Iran 2016–2026

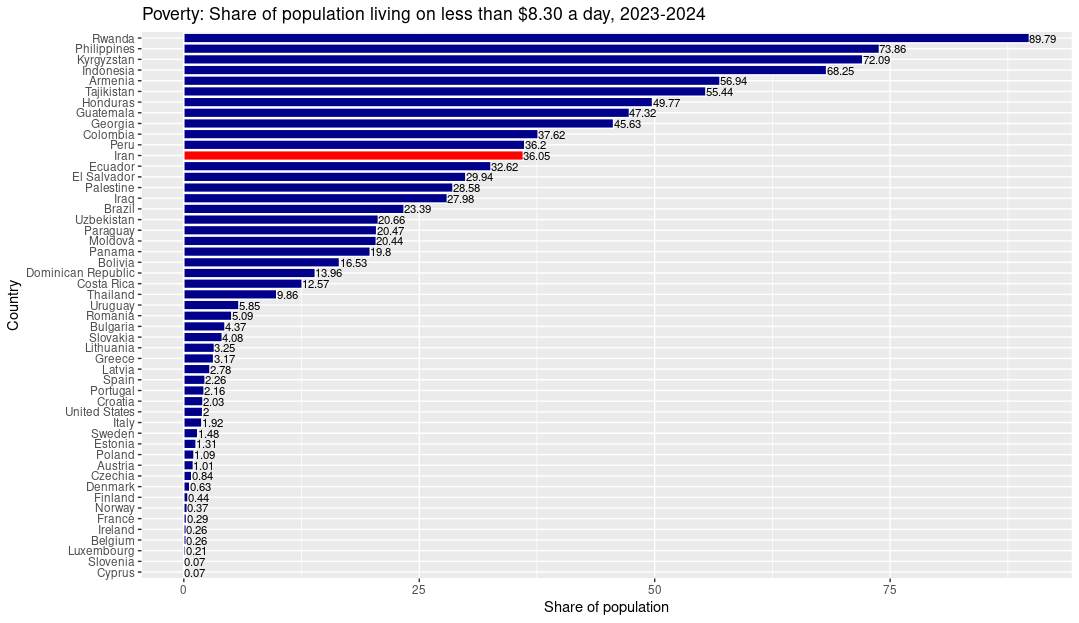
Poverty- Share of population living on less than $8.30 a day, 2023–2024

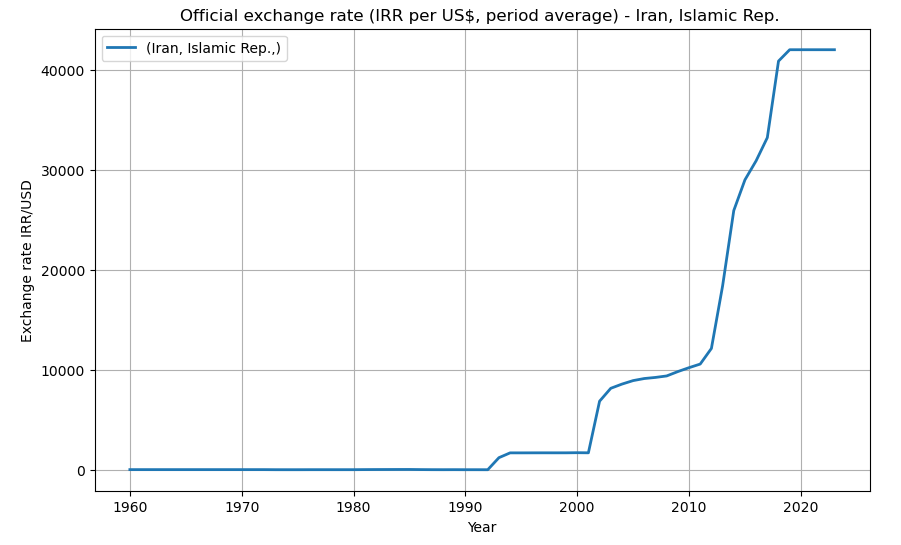
Official exchange rate (IRR per US$, period average) - Iran, Islamic Rep

The Iranian economic crisis is an ongoing period of severe financial instability in Iran that intensified in 2024. The downturn is rooted in long-standing issues such as domestic mismanagement, systemic corruption, and strict international sanctions. These structural problems were severely compounded by a United States naval blockade in mid-2026, which heavily restricted the country's oil exports and its integration with global markets.

Primary indicators of the crisis include hyperinflation, a historic depreciation of the Iranian rial, extensive energy and food shortages, and rising poverty. The deteriorating economic environment has driven widespread social unrest, culminating in nationwide protests, labour strikes, and a political crisis within the Iranian government. By late 2025, international analysts and media outlets widely described the Iranian economy as being on the verge of total collapse.

The country's economy sank into a severe recession in 2026, with spring GDP shrinking by 10.1% as soaring costs and collapsing purchasing power left shopping malls deserted and forced many businesses to close. Ordinary Iranians have effectively become the state’s “shock absorbers.”Official unemployment rose to 9.1% while inflation climbed to nearly 90%, and the government struggled to pay salaries and cut social benefits. An estimated 45% of the population now lives below the poverty line.The country is trapped in a cycle of “managed erosion,” where the authorities preserve stability by shifting the burden of sanctions onto households. This approach depletes private savings and gradually decays national infrastructureIn April 2026 the International Monetary Fund projected that inflation in Iran would reach 69%. The forecast underscored the persistent price pressures weighing on the Iranian economy. The Islamic Regime has also speculated on further taxing crypto and digital trade as well as gold and currency change.

== Macroeconomic trends ==
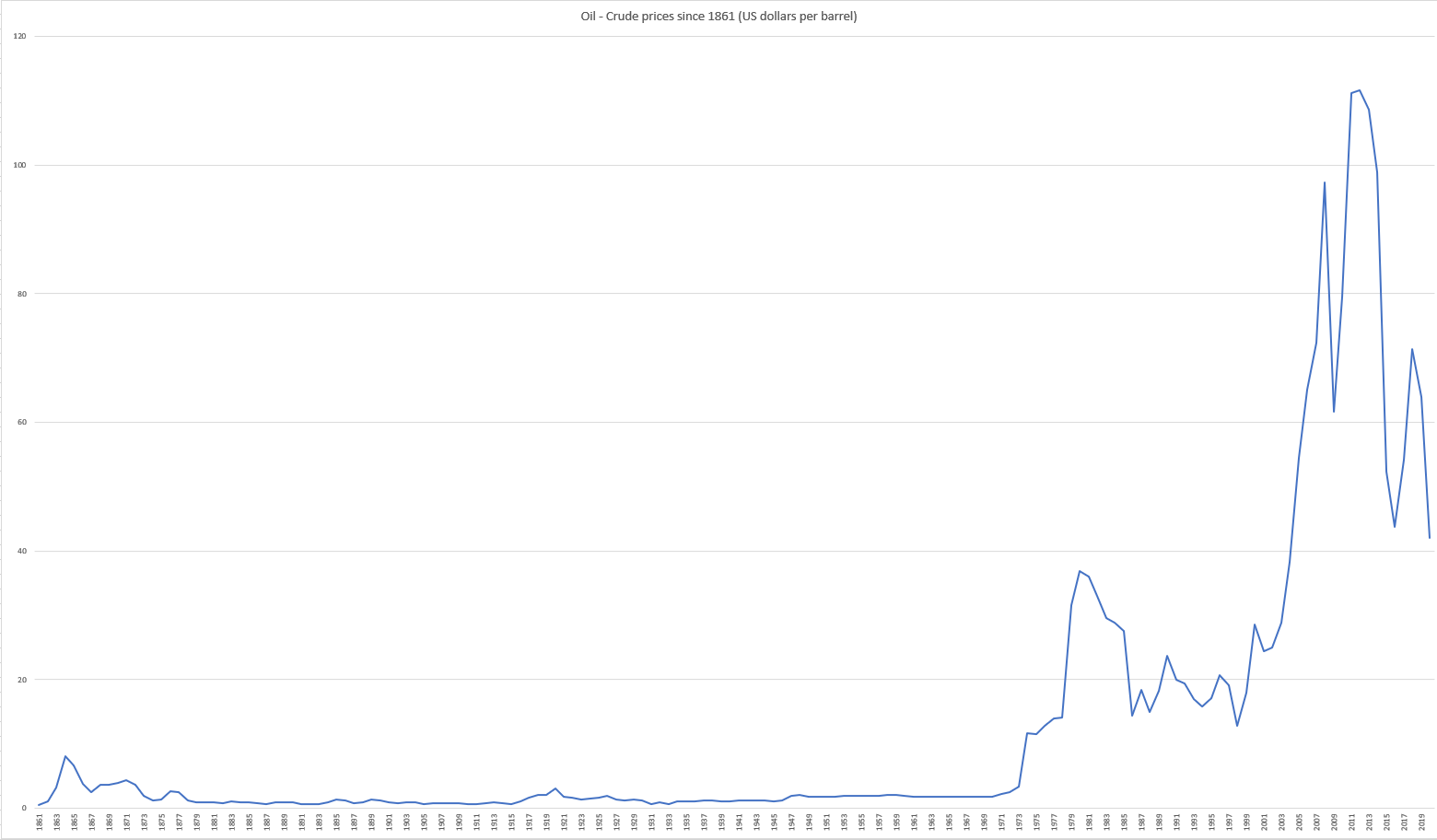
Nominal price of oil from 1861 to 2020 from Our World in Data

Iran's national science budget in 2005 was about $900 million, roughly equivalent to the 1990 figure. By early 2000, Iran allocated around 0.4% of its GDP to research and development, ranking the country behind the world average of 1.4%. In 2009 the ratio of research to GDP was 0.87% against the government's medium-term target of 2.5%. Iran ranked first in scientific growth in the world in 2011 and 17th in science production in 2012. Iran has a broad and diversified industrial base.

According to The Economist, Iran ranked 39th in a list of industrialized nations, producing $23 billion of industrial products in 2008. Between 2008 and 2009 Iran moved to 28th from 69th place in annual industrial production growth because of its relative isolation from the 2008 financial crisis and because the price of oil reached an alltime high in the first half of 2008. In the early 21st century the service sector was Iran's largest, followed by industry (mining and manufacturing) and agriculture.

Iran's long-term economic growth since the 1979 Islamic Revolution has been far below its pre-revolution performance. According to Central Bank data, GDP grew on average only about 1.9% per year from 1979 to 2020, compared to 9.1% annually in 1960–1979 before the revolution. The Iran–Iraq War (1980–88) caused a deep recession: during 1981–89 Iran's GDP grew only 0.9% annually on average, the lowest of any period, as war destruction and revolutionary upheaval crippled output. In the early 1990s, after the war, Iran saw a rebound – President Akbar Hashemi Rafsanjani's administration (1989–1997) achieved about 5.5% average growth by rebuilding infrastructure and liberalizing parts of the economy.

After a modest recovery in 2020–2022, the International Monetary Fund and World Bank estimated Iran's real GDP growth at around 2–5% in 2022–2024, partly due to higher oil prices and improved non-oil output. 2025 was worse: after new U.S. sanctions and the mid-2025 conflict, the IMF projected near zero growth (0.3%) for 2025, revising down earlier forecasts. Oil production and exports have been constrained by sanctions and the 2025 war damage; Iran's oil exports, which averaged ~1.4–1.7 million barrels/day in 2024, were expected to drop by several hundred thousand barrels in 2025 under sanctions.

According to the IMF estimations, in 2026 Iran’s economy is roughly one-fifth the size of Saudi Arabia and Turkey, less than half the size of the UAE and Israel, and it is about 20% smaller than Kazakhstan’s economy.

The IMF projects that in 2026 the economy will contract by 6.1% and the inflation rate will reach to 68.9%.

- GDP, PPP, million (current international $)
- GDP per capita, PPP (current international $)

Changes in population of Iran

Year (Source: IMF)	GDP, current prices (billions IRR)	Implied PPP conversion rate (USD/IRR)	GDP per capita, PPP (current international dollar)	Inflation index (average CPI) (2011/2012=100)	Current account balance (billions US dollars)	Population (million persons)
1980	6,622	40	4,267	0.5	-3.6	38
1985	16,556	53	6,469	0.9	-0.9	48
1990	35,315	101	6,410	2.5	-2.7	55
1995	185,928	399	7,265	9	3.4	64
2000	580,473	940	9,666	21	12.5	64
2005	1,831,739	2,025	13,036	40	15.4	69
2010	4,333,088	3,498	16,664	82	27.3	74
2015 (est.)	13,077,142	9,788	16,918	253	6.9	79

=== Reform plan ===
Before 2010, expansion of public healthcare and international relations were the other main objectives of the fifth plan, an ambitious series of measures that included subsidy reform, banking recapitalization, currency reform, taxation, customs, construction, employment, nationwide goods and services distribution, social justice and productivity. The intent was to make the country self-sufficient by 2015 and replace the payment of $100 billion in subsidies annually with targeted social assistance.

By removing energy subsidies around 2010, Iran intended to make its industries more efficient and competitive. By 2016, one third of Iran's economic growth was expected to originate from productivity improvement. Energy subsidies left the economy as one of the world's least energy-efficient, with energy intensity three times the global average and 2.5 times higher than the Middle Eastern average.

== National planning ==
Iran's budget is established by the Management and Planning Organization of Iran and proposed by the government to the parliament before the year's end. Following approval of the budget by Majlis, the central bank presents a detailed monetary and credit policy to the Money and Credit Council (MCC) for approval. Thereafter, major elements of these policies are incorporated into the five-year economic development plan. The plan is part of "Vision 2025", a strategy for long-term sustainable growth.

Fifth Economic Development Plan (2010–15)
Item	2010 (achieved)	2010–15 (target)
GDP world ranking	18th largest economy by PPP	12th in 2015
Annual growth rate	2.6%	8% on average (based on $1.1 trillion domestic and FDI); BMI forecast: 3.6% on average (2009–14)
Unemployment	11.8% according to government; unofficially: 12–22%; 30% according to opposition	7% by 2015, by creating 1 million new jobs each year
Inflation rate	15% (as of January 2010)	12% on average
Privatization	—N/a	20% of state-owned firms to be privatized each year
Share of cooperative sector (% GDP)	< 5%	25%
R&D (% GDP)	0.87%	2.5%
Share of non-oil exports	20%	30% ($83 billion) by 2016
Oil price & revenues in budget	$60 per barrel	$65 per barrel on average / $250 billion in oil and gas revenues in 2015 once the current projects come on stream; International Monetary Fund projections: ~$60 billion only
National Development Fund	—N/a	30% of oil revenues to be allocated to the National Development Fund by 2015
Oil production	4.1 million bpd	5.2 million bpd (with some 2,500 oil and gas wells to be drilled and commissioned)
Natural gas production	—N/a	900 million cubic meter/day
R&D projects in oil industry	—N/a	Implementation of 380 research projects by 2015 covering the enhancement of the recovery rate, gas conversion and hydro conversion
Investment in oil and gas industry	—N/a	$20 billion a year in private and foreign investment, in part to boost oil refining capacity
Petrochemical output	~50 million tpy	100 million tpy
Bunkering	25% market share in Persian Gulf	50% market share or 7.5 million tpy of liquid fuel
Oil products storage capacity	11.5 billion liters	16.7 billion liters
Natural gas storage capacity	—N/a	14 billion cubic meters
Electricity generation capacity	61,000 MW	86,000 MW
Efficiency of power plants	38%	45%
Investment in mining and industry	—N/a	$70 billion / 700,000 billion rials
Crude steel production	~10 million tpy	42 million tpy by 2015
Iron ore production	~27 million tpy	66 million tpy by 2015
Cement	~71 million tpy	110 million tpy
Limestone	—N/a	166 million tpy
Industrial parks	—N/a	50 new industrial parks to be built by 2015
Ports capacity	150 million tons	200 million tons
Railways	10,000 kilometers	15,000 kilometers by 2015 at a cost of $8 billion per annum
Transit	7 million tons	40 million tons of goods
Electronic trade	—N/a	20% of domestic trade, 30% of foreign trade and 80% of government transactions to be made electronically

== Fiscal policy ==
Since the 1979 revolution, government spending has averaged 59% on social policies, 17% on economic matters, 15% on national defense, and 13% on general affairs. Payments averaged 39% on education, health and social security, 20% on other social programs, 3% on agriculture, 16% on water, power and gas, 5% on manufacturing and mining, 12% on roads and transportation and 5% on other economic affairs. Iran's investment reached 27.7% of GDP in 2009. Between 2002 and 2006, inflation fluctuated around 14%.

In 2008, around 55% of government revenue came from oil and natural gas revenue, with 31% from taxes and fees. There are virtually millions of people who do not pay taxes in Iran and hence operate outside the formal economy. The budget for year 2012 was $462 billion, 9% less than 2011. The budget is based on an oil price of $85 per barrel. The value of the US dollar is estimated at IRR 12,260 for the same period.

According to the head of the Department of Statistics of Iran, if the rules of budgeting were observed the government could save at least 30 to 35% on its expenses. The central bank's interest rate is 21%, and the inflation rate has climbed to 22% in 2012, 10% higher than in 2011. There is little alignment between fiscal and monetary policy. According to the Central Bank of Iran, the gap between the rich and the poor narrowed because of monthly subsidies but the trend could reverse if high inflation persists.

=== Defense-related burden ===
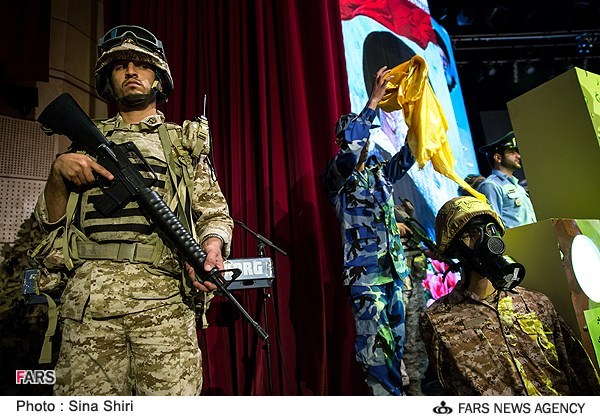
Iran Ministry of Defense New Weapons Ceremony and Young Soldier Festival

According to official data, as of 2023 Iran spends 10.3 billion USD or 2.1% of its GDP on national defense. This percentage is similar to that in other countries such as UK, France and Finland. In 2025, the Iranian budget bill granted 51% of the total oil and gas export revenues, estimated at 12 billion euros, to the Islamic Revolutionary Guard Corps (IRGC) and the Law Enforcement Command (LEF).

Iran also finances Hezbollah, the Yemeni Houthis, Iraqi militia, and Hamas. The average annual budget reserved for the funding of Iran's proxies is estimated at US$1.6 billion. According to Syrian opposition sources, starting from the beginning of 2011, Iran allocated a total of US$50 billion to maintain the Bashar al-Assad regime in Syria. However, this investment proved to be a failure following the eventual collapse of the regime in late 2024.

The most costly of Iran's defense expenditures is its nuclear program. The estimated total cost of Iran's nuclear program until 2025 approaches US$500 billion. As a result of its nuclear program, Iran is subject to international sanctions, causing a long-term economic stagnation which cost Iran an additional US$1.2 trillion over 12 years. Furthermore, the sanctions led to a significant decline in foreign direct investments (FDI), with Iran experiencing a reduction of approximately 80% in FDI between 2011 and 2021.

== Inflation ==
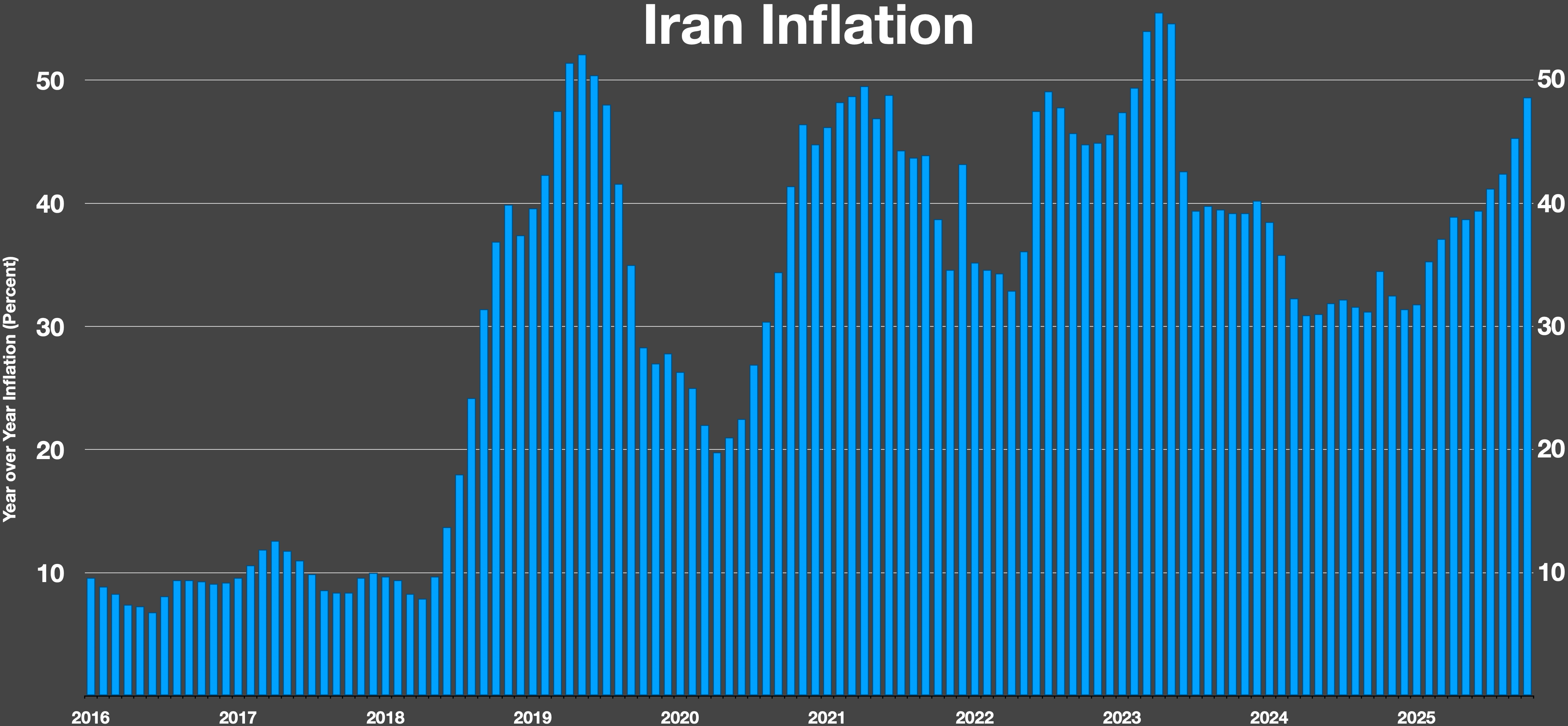
Iran inflation

Inflation in Iran has been persistently high since the revolution, eroding living standards. During 1960–1978, Iran's inflation was usually in single digits, but after 1979 it surged into double digits almost every year. From 1979 to 2024, consumer prices increased astronomically – an item that cost 100 rials in 1960 costs over 2 million rials by 2025. The average inflation rate since 1979 has been about 17–18% per year, compared to under 10% before 1979. Periodic bouts of very high inflation occurred: in the 1980s during the war and money-printing, inflation topped 20–30%. In the 1990s, it spiked above 50% (in 1995). Tightening measures brought inflation down to ~10% by the early 2000s, but it accelerated again later. International sanctions on Iran's oil and banking (especially 2012 and 2018 onward) led to currency devaluation and shortages, driving inflation to 30–50% annually in 2018–2023. By 2023–2024, Iran's annual inflation was roughly 40%, particularly elevated for food prices, which led to steep declines in real incomes. In 2025, amid renewed sanctions and war disruption, the IMF raised Iran's projected inflation to over 43%, placing Iran as the 4th-highest inflation country globally (after Venezuela, Sudan, Zimbabwe). The latest data shows that the annual inflation rate reached 38.7% in May 2025. Due to the high inflation and the devaluation of the Iranian real (90% since 2018) have brought the Iran's parliament to approve a bill in committee that paves the way to remove four zeros from the national currency, the rial, in an effort to tackle long-term inflation. However, experts say that while cutting zeros from the currency may have some benefits, it does not offer a clear solution to Iran's deeper economic problems.

In August 2025, Iran effectively raised taxation by introducing a new law making inflation partly taxable framing it as a tool against hoarding in a country where inflation often exceeds 40 percent.

As of April 2026, the IMF forecasts that the inflation in Iran will hit 69%.

== AI development act ==
In July 2026, Iran introduced tax incentives and credits for use and manufacturing of advanced intelligence and data center infrastructure, the government takes 10% of Ministry of ICT income to develop AI systems and establishes AI fund Nationally for raising 100,000,000,000,000,00 trillion toman in funding for AI with NDF National Development Fund contributing 25%.

== Public finances ==
Iran had an estimated $110 billion in foreign reserves in 2011 and balances its external payments by pricing oil at approximately $75 per barrel. As of 2013, only $30 to $50 billion of those reserves are accessible because of current sanctions. Iranian media has questioned the reason behind Iran's government non-repatriation of its foreign reserves before the imposition of the latest round of sanctions and its failure to convert into gold. As a consequence, the Iranian rial lost more than 40% of its value between December 2011 and April 2012.

Iran's external and fiscal accounts reflect falling oil prices in FY 2012, but remain in surplus. The current account was expected to reach a surplus of 2.1% of GDP in FY 2012, and the net fiscal balance (after payments to Iran's National Development Fund) will register a surplus of 0.3% of GDP. In 2013 the external debts stood at $7.2 billion down from $17.3 billion in 2012. Overall fiscal deficit is expected to deteriorate to 2.7% of GDP in FY 2016 from 1.7% in 2015. Money in circulation reached $700 billion in March 2020 (based on the 2017 pre-devaluation exchange rate), thus furthering the decline of the Iranian rial and rise in inflation.

=== Iranian rial ===
The Iranian rial has continually lost value, especially since the 2010s. The currency was roughly 70 rials per US dollar before 1979; after the revolution and war, it fell to ~1,700 rials/USD by 1990s, and kept sliding. Following the U.S. withdrawal from the nuclear deal (2018) and sanctions, the rial's decline accelerated: the free-market exchange rate crossed 300,000 rials/USD in 2020, then 600,000 by late 2022, and hit 1,000,000 rials per USD in early 2025 – a psychological milestone of 1 million. Authorities periodically attempted currency reforms, e.g., banning exchange shops, unifying rates, or proposing to cut four zeros from the currency, but the underlying pressures of limited foreign exchange and excess money supply have kept the rial weak. By 2025, Iran's currency and inflation problems were severe enough that even basic goods saw rapid price rises, sparking protests over living costs. Subsidy reforms led to jumps in prices of staples like bread and medicine.

== Corruption ==
Transparency International defines corruption as the "abuse of entrusted power for personal gain". Its annual Corruption Perceptions Index evaluates perceived corruption in the public sector of many countries (182 in 2025) on a "combination of at least 3 data sources drawn from 13 different corruption surveys and assessments. ... collected by a variety of reputable institutions, including the World Bank and the World Economic Forum". The 2025 Index scored Iran at 23 on a scale from 0 ("highly corrupt") to 100 ("very clean") where 42 was the global average. The country perceived to be least corrupt (Denmark) scored 89, and the two perceived most corrupt (Somalia and South Sudan) scored 9. Regionally, the average score among Middle Eastern and North African countries (Note: Algeria, Bahrain, Egypt, Iran, Iraq, Israel, Jordan, Kuwait, Lebanon, Libya, Morocco, Oman, Qatar, Saudi Arabia, Syria, Tunisia, United Arab Emirates, and Yemen) was 39. The best score in the region was 69 (the United Arab Emirates) and the worst scores were 12 (Libya and Yemen).

Since the current version of the Corruption Perceptions Index was introduced in 2012, Iran's score has steadily declined from its high point of 30 in 2017 to its lowest-ever scores of 23 in 2024 and 2025. Its score in the World Bank's Worldwide Governance Indicators has also declined, from 33.42/100 in 2018 to 29.75/100 in 2024.

== Stock market ==
Iran's stock market, the Tehran Stock Exchange (TSE), has experienced boom-and-bust cycles in recent years, often moving opposite to the real economy. During recessions and currency devaluation, many Iranians invested in stocks as a hedge against inflation, fueling speculative rallies. In 2019–2020, amid U.S. "maximum pressure" sanctions and a recession, the TSE index surged by over 500% within a year. By late 2020 and into 2021, the bubble burst – the market crashed over 30% from its peak by early 2021, wiping out many small investors' savings. Allegations emerged that government insiders had benefited from selling at highs, causing public mistrust.

Structural issues, such as lack of market depth, high inflation, and political risks, continue to make Iran's stock market volatile. Following the war, analysts argued that without genuine government support (e.g. large capital injections like those used to stabilize the currency), the market downturn could deepen, as the war's aftermath and ongoing sanctions deter both local and foreign investors.

== Ownership ==
Social class in Iran
1. Upper class (4.30%)
2. Middle-class (32.0%)
3. Working class (15.0%)
4. Lower class/relative poverty (42.0%)
5. Lower class/absolute poverty (6.70%)

Following the conclusion of hostilities with Iraq, the Government declared its intention to privatize most industries and to liberalize and decentralize the economy. Sale of state-owned companies proceeded slowly, mainly due to opposition by a nationalist majority in the parliament. In 2006, most industries, some 70% of the economy, remained state-owned. The majority of heavy industries including steel, petrochemicals, copper, automobiles, and machine tools remained in the public sector, with most light industry privately owned.

Since Article 44 has never been strictly enforced, the private sector has played a much larger role than that outlined in the constitution. In recent years, the role of this sector has increased. A 2004 constitutional amendment allows 80% of state assets to be privatized. Forty percent of such sales are to be conducted through the "Justice Shares" scheme and the rest through the Tehran Stock Exchange. The government would retain the remaining 20%.

In 2005 government assets were estimated at $120 billion. Some $63 billion of such assets were privatized from 2005 to 2010, reducing the government's direct share of GDP from 80% to 40%. Many companies in Iran remain uncompetitive because of mismanagement over the years, thus making privatization less attractive for potential investors. According to then-President Mahmoud Ahmadinejad, 60% of Iran's wealth is controlled by just 300 people.

=== Islamic Revolutionary Guard Corps ===
The Islamic Revolutionary Guard Corps (IRGC) are thought to control about one third of Iran's economy through subsidiaries and trusts. 2007 estimates by the Los Angeles Times suggest the IRGC has ties to over one hundred companies and annual revenue in excess of $12 billion, particularly in construction. The Ministry of Petroleum awarded the IRGC billions of dollars in no-bid contracts as well as major infrastructure projects.

Tasked with border control, the IRGC maintains a monopoly on smuggling, costing Iranian companies billions of dollars each year. Smuggling is encouraged in part by the generous subsidization of domestic goods, including fuel. The IRGC also runs the telecommunication company, laser eye-surgery clinics, makes cars, builds bridges and roads and develops oil and gas fields.

=== Religious foundations ===
Welfare programs for the needy are managed by more than 30 public agencies alongside semi-state organizations known as bonyads, together with several private non-governmental organizations. Bonyads are a consortium of over 120 tax-exempt organizations that receive subsidies and religious donations. They answer directly to the Supreme Leader of Iran and control over 20% of GDP. Operating everything from vast soybean and cotton farms to hotels, soft drink, automobile manufacturing, and shipping lines, they are seen as overstaffed, corrupt and generally unprofitable.

Bonyad companies compete with Iran's unprotected private sector, whose firms complain of the difficulty of competing with the subsidized bonyads. Bonyads are not subject to audit or Iran's accounting laws. Setad is a multi-sector business organization, with holdings of 37 companies, and an estimated value of $95 billion. It is under the control of the Supreme Leader, Mojtaba Khamenei, and created from thousands of properties confiscated from Iranians.

== Labor force ==
Employment by sectors (2003)
sector	persons
Agriculture	4,009,155
Social, personal and household services & Public service	3,934,317
Mining & Manufacturing	3,019,576
Trade, restaurant & hotel	2,820,927
Construction & Real estate services	2,395,144
Transportation, warehousing & Telecommunications	1,541,401
Financial & monetary institutions services	366,352
Oil & gas	136,803
Electricity	77,026
Water	63,510
Labor force: 18,364,211 (total) note: Lack of skilled labor

After the revolution the government established a national education system that improved adult literacy rates. In 2008, 85% of the adult population was literate, well ahead of the regional average of 62%. The Human Development Index was 0.749 in 2013, placing Iran in the "high human development" bracket.

In 2008 annual economic growth of above 5% was necessary to absorb the 750,000 new labor force entrants each year. In 2020, agriculture was 10% of GDP and employed 16% of the labor force. In 2017, the industrial sector, which includes mining, manufacturing, and construction, was 35% of GDP and employed 35% of the labor force. In 2009, mineral products, notably petroleum, accounted for 80% of Iran's export revenues, even though mining employs less than 1% of the labor force.

In 2004 the service sector ranked as the largest contributor to GDP, at 48% of the economy, and employed 44% of workers. Women made up 33% of the labor force in 2005. Youth unemployment, aged 15–24, was 29.1% in 2012, resulting in significant brain drain. In 2016, according to the government, some 40% of the workforce in the public sector are either in excess or incompetent.

As of 2025 Iran has a population 92.4M, of which 71M are 15 years old or above. Out of a population of 71M, 29,521,716 (67.2% of males and 14% of female) participated in the labor force (either as workers or unemployed), or 41% of the population in the ages 15+. The unemployment rate in 2025 was 8.3% (2,450,302 people), and the unemployment rate among the young (ages 15-24) reached to 21.9%. Moreover, as of April 2026 more than a million people lost their jobs due the war with USA and Israel.

=== Labor force and the public sector ===
The Islamic Republic of Iran employs around 8 million individuals, of whom roughly 3 million hold formal positions within the three branches of government, the armed forces, and leadership institutions. These roles encompass bureaucratic staff, civil servants, and uniformed military personnel.

Beyond the formal government structure, approximately 2.3 million individuals are employed in quasi-governmental organizations, including state-owned enterprises, national banks, municipalities, and the Islamic Azad University. Additionally, about 2.5 million pensioners receive state stipends, often distributed through the Relief Committee, a government-controlled charitable organization. As a result, nearly one in ten Iranian citizens maintain a regular financial connection to the state.

=== Unemployment ===
Unemployment in Iran has remained at high single digits officially, but underemployment and joblessness among youth are significant concerns. However, this headline figure masks labor force dropout: over 38 million working-age Iranians (especially women and youth) are economically inactive, and only 25 million were employed, indicating a very low labor participation rate (around 41%). Youth unemployment is much higher: for ages 18–35 it was around 15%, and for 15–24 year-olds about 20% in 2024–25 (with young women's jobless rate even higher, near 35%).

=== Personal income ===
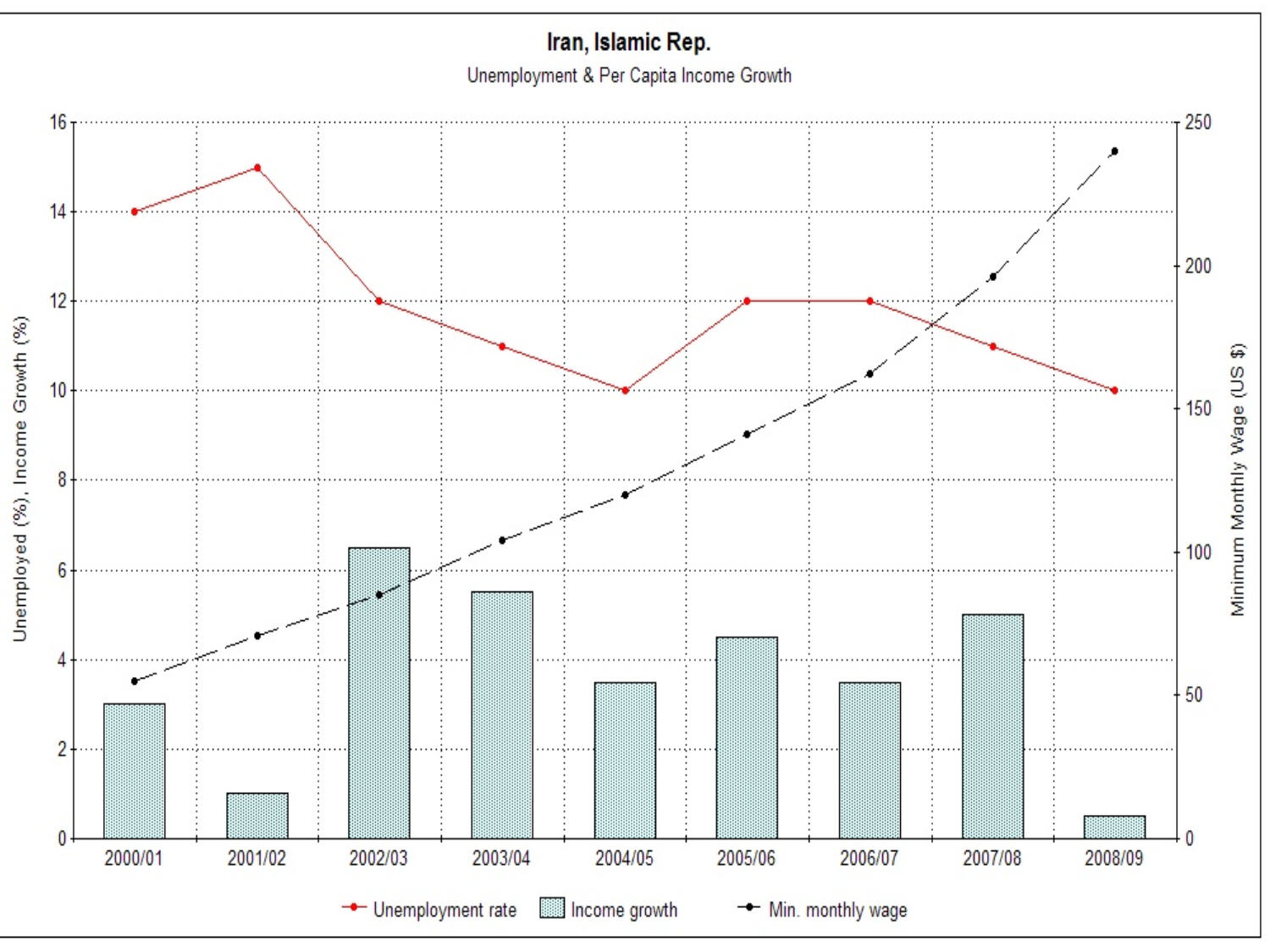
Unemployment rate, per-capita income growth and minimum wage, 2000–2009

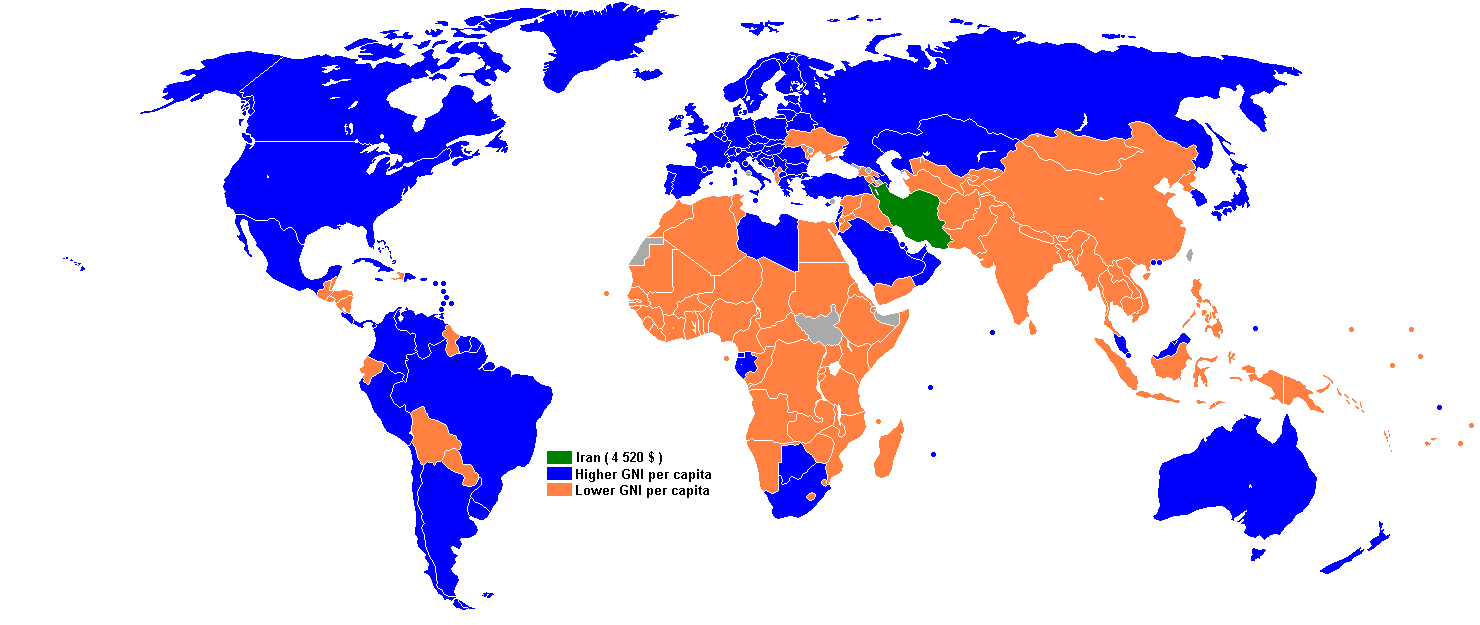
GNI per capita: Iran in 2010: $4,520 nominal. 2012: $13,000 PPP. Higher GNI per capita compared to Iran Lower GNI per capita compared to Iran

Iran is classed as a middle income country and has made significant progress in provision of health and education services in the period covered by the Millennium Development Goals (MDGs). In 2010, Iran's average monthly income was about $500. The GNI per capita in 2012 was $13,000, by PPP. A minimum national wage applies to each sector of activity as defined by the Supreme Labor Council. In 2009 this was about $263 per month ($3,156 per year).

In 2001 some 20% of household consumption was spent on food, 32% on fuel, 12% on health care and 8% on education. In 2015, Iranians had little personal debt. In 2007, seventy percent of Iranians owned their homes.

In 2018–2019 the median household income of Iran was 434,905,000 rials (slightl $3,300), an 18.6% rise from 2017 to 2018, when median household income was about 366,700,000 rials. Adjusted for purchasing power parity, Iran's 2017–2018 median income was equivalent to about $28,647 (2017 conversion factor, private consumption, LCU).

As the average Iranian household size is 3.5, this puts median personal income at around $8,185. While Iran rates relatively well on income, median wealth is very low for its income level, on par with Vietnam or Djibouti, indicating a high level of spending. According to SCI, median household spending in 2018 was 393,227,000 rials, or 90.5% of the median household income of 434,905,000 rials.

After the 1979 revolution, the composition of the middle class in Iran did not change significantly, but its size doubled from about 15% of the population in 1979 to more than 32% in 2000. In 2008, the official poverty line in Tehran for 2008 was $9,612. The national average poverty line was $4,932. In 2010, Iran's Department of Statistics announced that 10 million Iranians live under the absolute poverty line and 30 million live under the relative poverty line.

Salaries and wages in Iran have not kept up with inflation, causing a steep decline in real purchasing power. The government sets a national minimum wage annually through the Supreme Labor Council. In March 2024, the minimum monthly wage was raised by 35% to 11,107,000 rials (about \$185 at the time, including certain benefits). However, due to rapid rial depreciation, by late 2024 that amount was worth only ~$137, while the cost of living spiked causing a real decrease of wages. Labor organizations note the minimum wage that once covered roughly half of a family's basic expenses now covers only one-quarter or less of essential costs.

=== Income inequality ===
According the inequality dataset of the World Bank, in 2002 the Gini index in Iran was 34.8, a level that is considered to be quite modest. However, closer data analysis reveals significant wealth concentration, with the top 10% of earners holding 52.7% of the national income – a larger share than in the United States or European countries.

Iran's Gini coefficient fell from ~0.50 in the late 1970s to ~0.40 by the mid-1980s. In the 2000s, inequality fluctuated around a Gini index of 0.38–0.40. In the late 2010s and 2020s, some official data suggested a slight decline in the Gini (possibly due to overall economic contraction hitting higher incomes). The World Bank estimated Iran's Gini index at around 36.0 in 2019, improving to 34.8 in 2022 (on a 0–100 scale where higher is more unequal).

=== Poverty ===
Poverty levels in Iran have risen in recent years amid sanctions and inflation, after some improvements in the 2000s. The Research Center of Iran's Parliament reported that poverty reached 30.1% of the population in 2023, up from about 26% in 2018, meaning around 25–27 million people unable to meet basic needs. Over 5 years, the poverty rate hovered around 30%, indicating persistent hardship. The World Bank estimated that in 2018, only 0.5% of Iranians lived on under $1.90/day (extreme poverty), but by 2021 the share living under the upper-middle-income country poverty line (~$6.85/day) had increased sharply due to inflation. By March 2022, Iranian media reported over 32 million people (around 38% of the population) were below the poverty line when considering the ability to afford essential food and housing, as inflation in food prices outpaced incomes.

Malnutrition in Iran has been reported as a growing social and economic issue amid the country's ongoing economic crisis. In August 2025, the Iranian newspaper Shargh, citing surveys conducted by NGOs and volunteer groups, highlighted severe deficiencies in food access and nutrition, particularly protein intake, across the population. The study revealed that only 1.7% of households reported daily protein consumption. About 27% of households reported no protein intake at all. Among households with temporary employment, over 93% consumed protein less than once a week or not at all. In unemployed households, this figure rose to 95%.

=== Social security, pensions and welfare ===
Although Iran does not offer universal social protection, in 1996, the Iranian Center for Statistics estimated that more than 73% of the Iranian population was covered by social security. Membership of the social security system for all employees is compulsory. Social security ensures employee protection against unemployment, disease, old age and occupational accidents. In 2003, the government began to consolidate its welfare organizations to eliminate redundancy and inefficiency. In 2003 the minimum standard pension was 50% of the worker's earnings but no less than the minimum wage. Iran spent 22.5% of its 2003 national budget on social welfare programs of which more than 50% covered pension costs. Out of the 15,000 homeless in Iran in 2015, 5,000 were women.

=== Trade unions ===
Although Iranian workers have a theoretical right to form labor unions, there is no union system in the country. Ostensible worker representation is provided by the Workers' House, a state-sponsored institution that attempts to challenge some state policies. Guild unions operate locally in most areas, but are limited largely to issuing credentials and licenses. The right to strike is generally not respected by the state. Since 1979 strikes have often been met by police action.

== Sectors ==
=== Agriculture, fishing, livestock and forestry ===
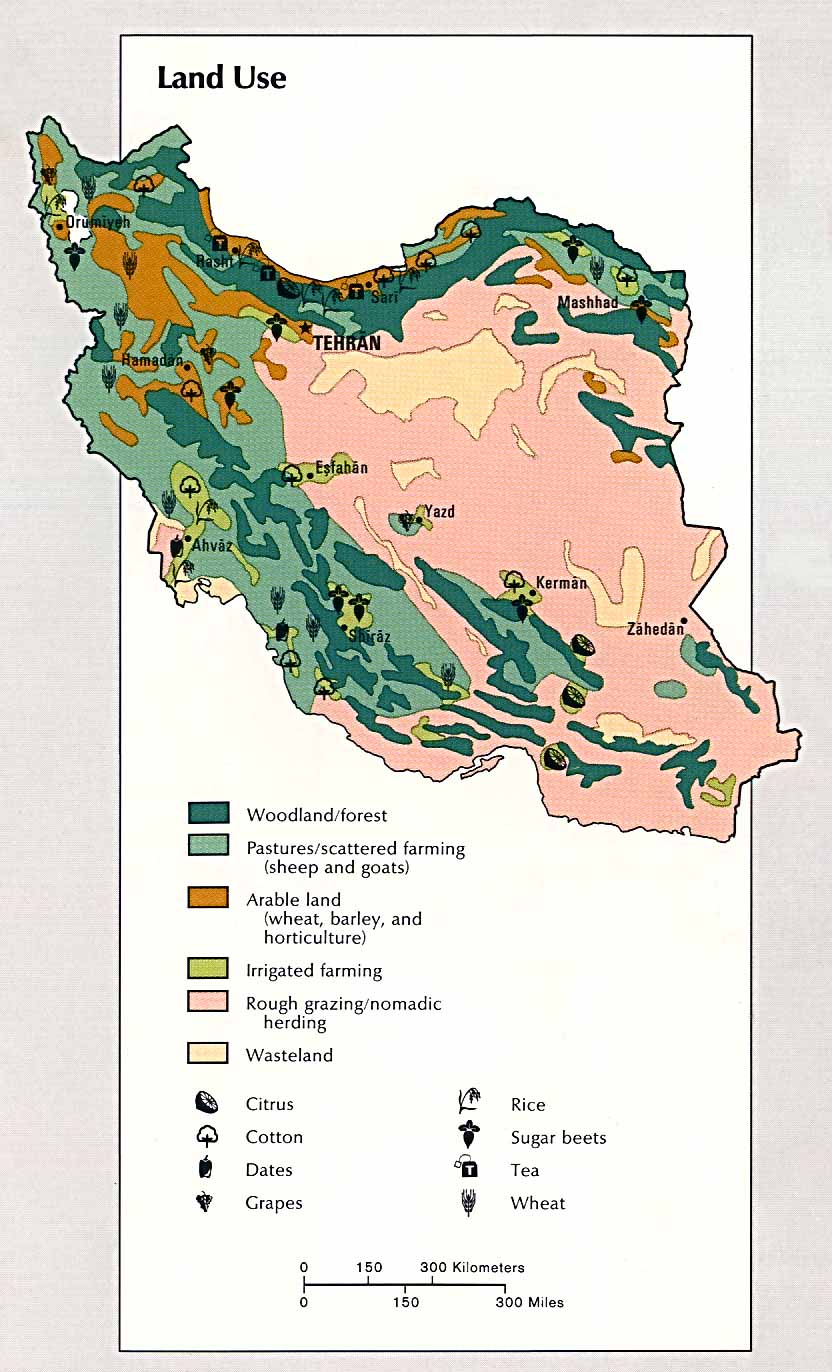
Wheat, the most important crop, is grown mainly in the west and northwest whilst rice is the major crop in the Caspian region.

Agriculture contributes 9.5% to the gross domestic product and employs 17% of the labor force. About 9% of Iran's land is arable, with the main food-producing areas located in the Caspian region and in northwestern valleys. Some northern and western areas support rain-fed agriculture, while others require irrigation. Primitive farming methods, overworked and under-fertilized soil, poor seed and water scarcity are the principal obstacles to increased production. About one third of total cultivated land is irrigated. Construction of multipurpose dams and reservoirs along rivers in the Zagros and Alborz mountains have increased the amount of water available for irrigation. Agricultural production is increasing as a result of modernization, mechanization, improvements to crops and livestock as well as land redistribution programs.

Wheat, the most important crop, is grown mainly in the west and northwest. Rice is the major crop in the Caspian region. Other crops include barley, corn, cotton, sugar beets, tea, hemp, tobacco, fruits, potatoes, legumes (beans and lentils), vegetables, fodder plants (alfalfa and clover), almonds, walnuts and spices including cumin and sumac. Iran is the world's largest producer of saffron, pistachios, honey, berberis and berries and the second largest dates producer. Meat and dairy products include lamb, goat meat, beef, poultry, milk, eggs, butter, and cheese.

Non-food products include wool, leather, and silk. Forestry products from the northern slopes of the Alborz Mountains are economically important. Tree-cutting is strictly controlled by the government, which also runs a reforestation program. Rivers drain into the Caspian Sea and are fished for salmon, carp, trout, pike, and sturgeon that produce caviar, of which Iran is the largest producer.

Since the 1979 revolution, commercial farming has replaced subsistence farming as the dominant mode of agricultural production. By 1997, the gross value reached $25 billion. Iran is 90% self-sufficient in essential agricultural products, although limited rice production leads to substantial imports. In 2007 Iran reached self-sufficiency in wheat production and for the first time became a net wheat exporter. By 2003, a quarter of Iran's non-oil exports were of agricultural products, including fresh and dried fruits, nuts, animal hides, processed foods, and spices. Iran exported $736 million worth of foodstuffs in 2007 and $1 billion (~600,000 tonnes) in 2010. A total of 12,198 entities are engaged in the Iranian food industry, or 12% of all entities in the industry sector. The sector also employs approximately 328,000 people or 16.1% of the entire industry sector's workforce.

The fishing industry in Iran is regulated by the Iran Fisheries Organization (Shilat), focusing on marine capture, aquaculture, and stock enhancement, with key operations in the Persian Gulf and Caspian Sea and major regional fishing hubs in Hormozgan and Chabahar. Exports bring in hundreds of millions of dollars, with tens of thousands of tons of seafood shipped out yearly. Illegal, unreported and unregulated fishing in the Persian Gulf is an acute problem.

Animal husbandry in Iran accounts for around 30% of direct agricultural employment, featuring key sectors such as sheep, dairy and poultry production. It traces back thousands of years as a core pillar of the rural and tribal economy. The poultry industry is Iran's second-largest industry next to oil. In 2012, Iran's poultry industry produced approximately 2 billion birds. Poultry production has grown significantly over the past few decades, with output rising from 195,000 tons in 1978 to 2.1 million tons in 2012.

=== Industrial and manufacturing ===
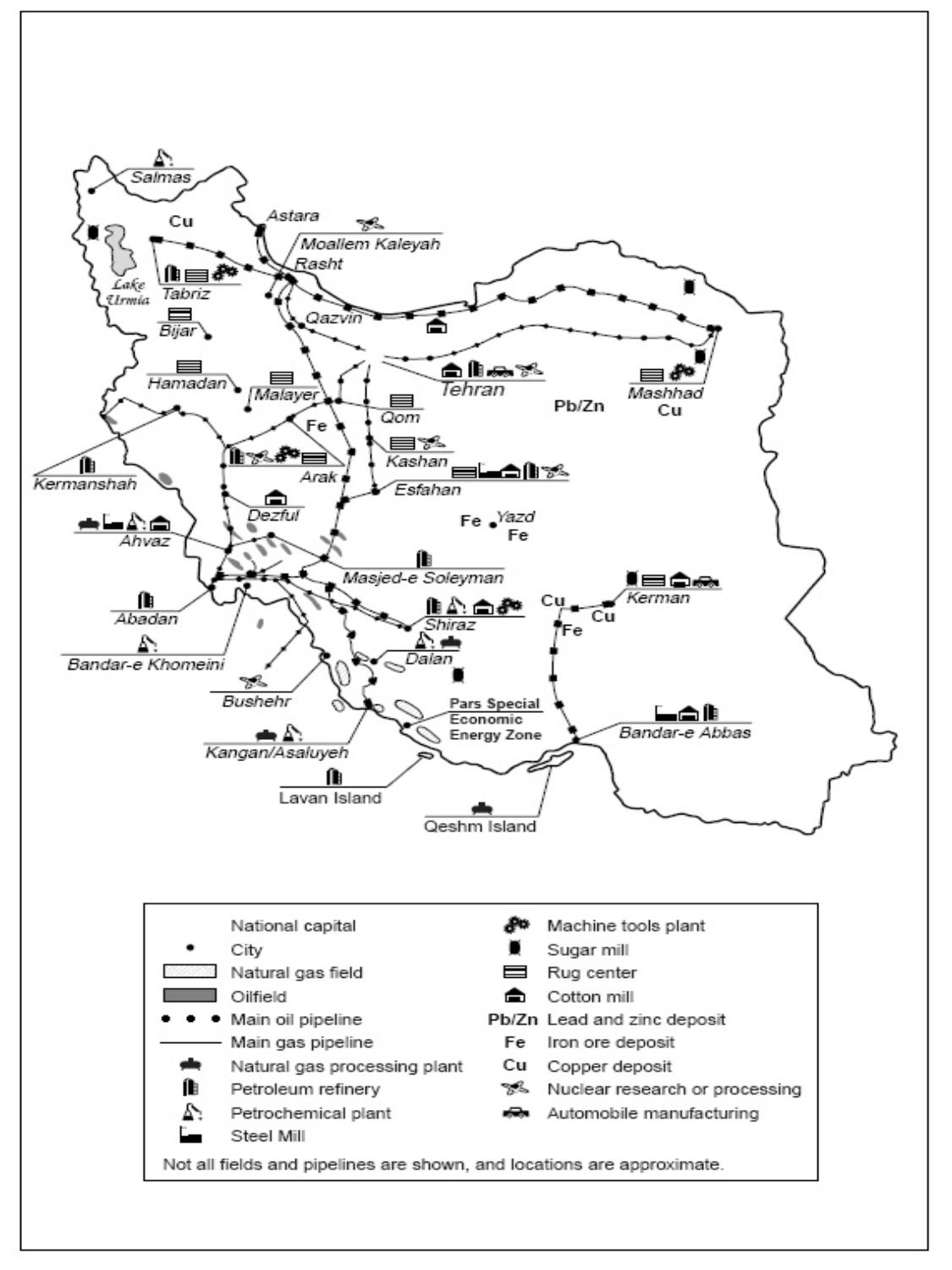
Iran has a diversified and broad industrial base. In 1998, the United Nations classified Iran's economy as "semi-developed".

Large-scale factory manufacturing began in the 1920s. With the help from the Soviet Union and the United States, Iran's domestic capabilities expanded to include heavy industries such as iron and steel, machinery tools, agricultural tractors, communications equipment, vehicles assembly and petrochemical products. During the Iran–Iraq War, Iraq bombed many of Iran's petrochemical plants, damaging the large oil refinery at Abadan bringing production to a halt. Reconstruction began in 1988 and production resumed in 1993. In spite of the war, many small factories sprang up to produce import-substitution goods and materials needed by the military.

Iran's major manufactured products are petrochemicals, steel and copper products. Other important manufactures include automobiles, home and electric appliances, telecommunications equipment, cement and industrial machinery. Iran operates the largest operational population of industrial robots in West Asia. Other products include paper, rubber products, processed foods, leather products and pharmaceuticals. In 2000, textile mills, using domestic cotton and wool such as Tehran Patou and Iran Termeh employed around 400,000 people around Tehran, Isfahan and along the Caspian coast.

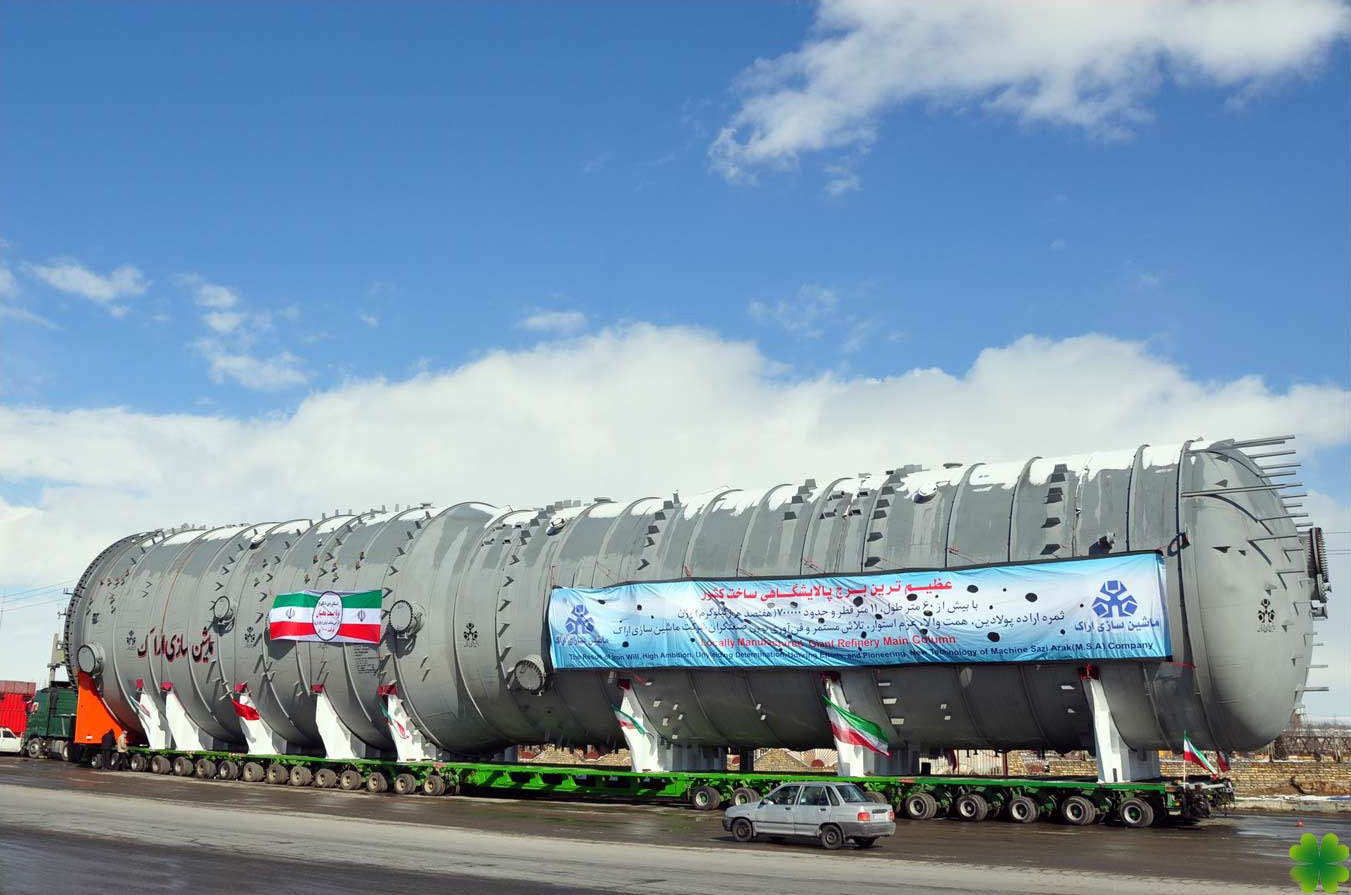
Giant Fractionating column manufactured by Machine Sazi Arak (MSA)

Despite these problems, Iran has progressed in various scientific and technological fields, including petrochemical, pharmaceutical, aerospace, defense, and heavy industry. Even in the face of economic sanctions, Iran is emerging as an industrialized country.

==== Handicrafts and textiles ====
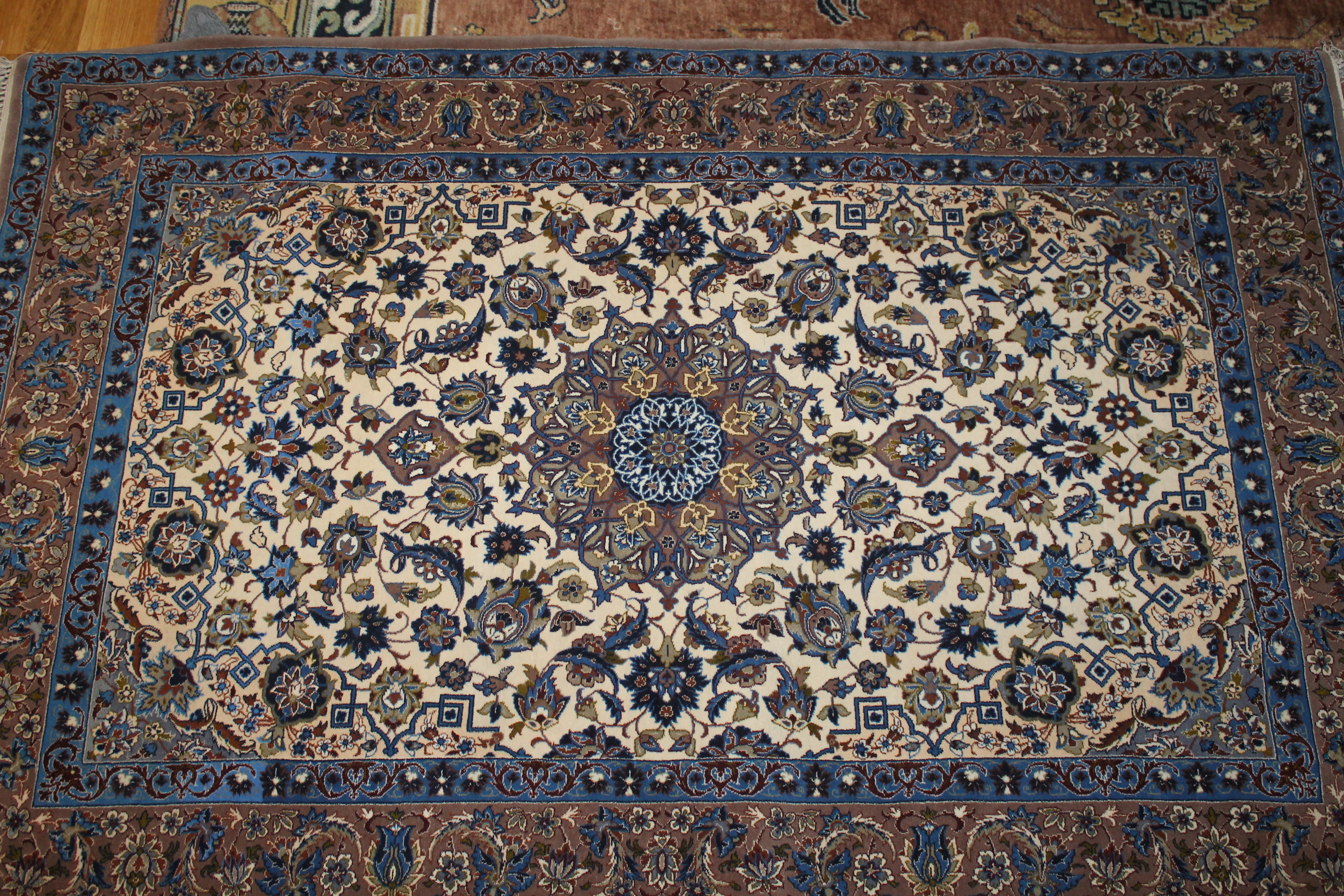
Persian carpet

Iran has a long tradition of producing artisanal goods including Persian carpets, ceramics, copperware, brassware, glass, leather goods, textiles and wooden artifacts. The country's carpet-weaving tradition dates from pre-Islamic times and remains an important industry contributing substantial amounts to rural incomes. An estimated 1.2 million weavers in Iran produce carpets for domestic and international export markets. More than $500 million worth of hand-woven carpets are exported each year, accounting for 30% of the 2008 world market. Around 5.2 million people work in some 250 handicraft fields and contribute 3% of GDP.

==== Automobile manufacturing ====
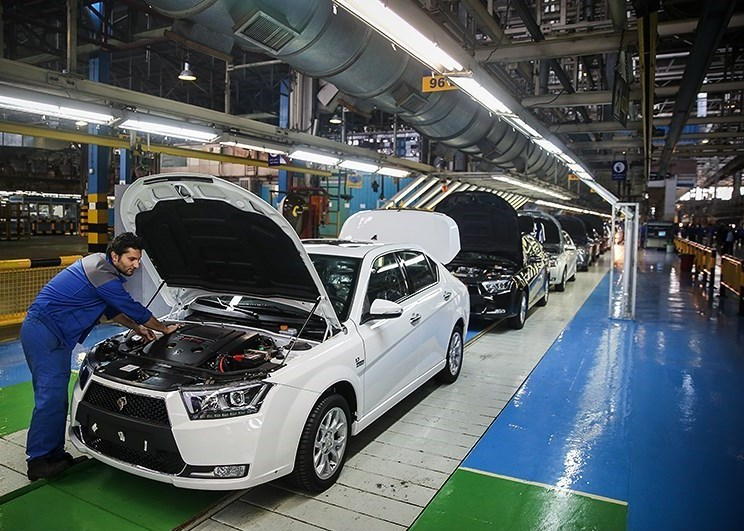
Iran Khodro is the largest car manufacturer in the Middle-East. It has established joint-ventures with foreign partners on 4 continents.

As of 2001, 13 public and privately owned automakers within Iran, led by Iran Khodro and SAIPA that accounted for 94% of domestic production. Iran Khodro's Paykan, replaced by the Samand in 2005, is the predominant brand. With 61% of the 2001 market, Khodro was the largest player, whilst Saipa contributed 33% that year. Other car manufacturers, such as the Bahman Group, Kerman Motors, Kish Khodro, Raniran, Traktorsazi, Shahab Khodro and others accounted for the remaining 6%.

These automakers produce a wide range of vehicles including motorbikes, passenger cars such as Saipa's Tiba, vans, mini trucks, medium-sized trucks, heavy trucks, minibuses, large buses and other heavy automobiles used for commercial and private activities in the country. In 2009 Iran ranked fifth in car production growth after China, Taiwan, Romania and India. Iran was the world's 12th biggest automaker in 2010 and operates a fleet of 11.5 million cars. Iran produced 1,395,421 cars in 2010, including 35,901 commercial vehicles.

==== Defense and aerospace ====
In 2007 the International Institute for Strategic Studies estimated Iran's defense budget at $7.31 billion, equivalent to 2.6% of GDP or $102 per capita, ranking it 25th internationally. The country's defense industry manufactures many types of arms and equipment. Since 1992, Iran's Defense Industries Organization (DIO) has produced its own tanks, armored personnel carriers, guided missiles, radar systems, guided missile destroyers, military vessels, submarines and fighter planes. In 2006 Iran exported weapons to 57 countries, including NATO members, and exports reached $100 million. It has also developed a sophisticated mobile air defense system dubbed as Bavar 373.

==== Construction ====
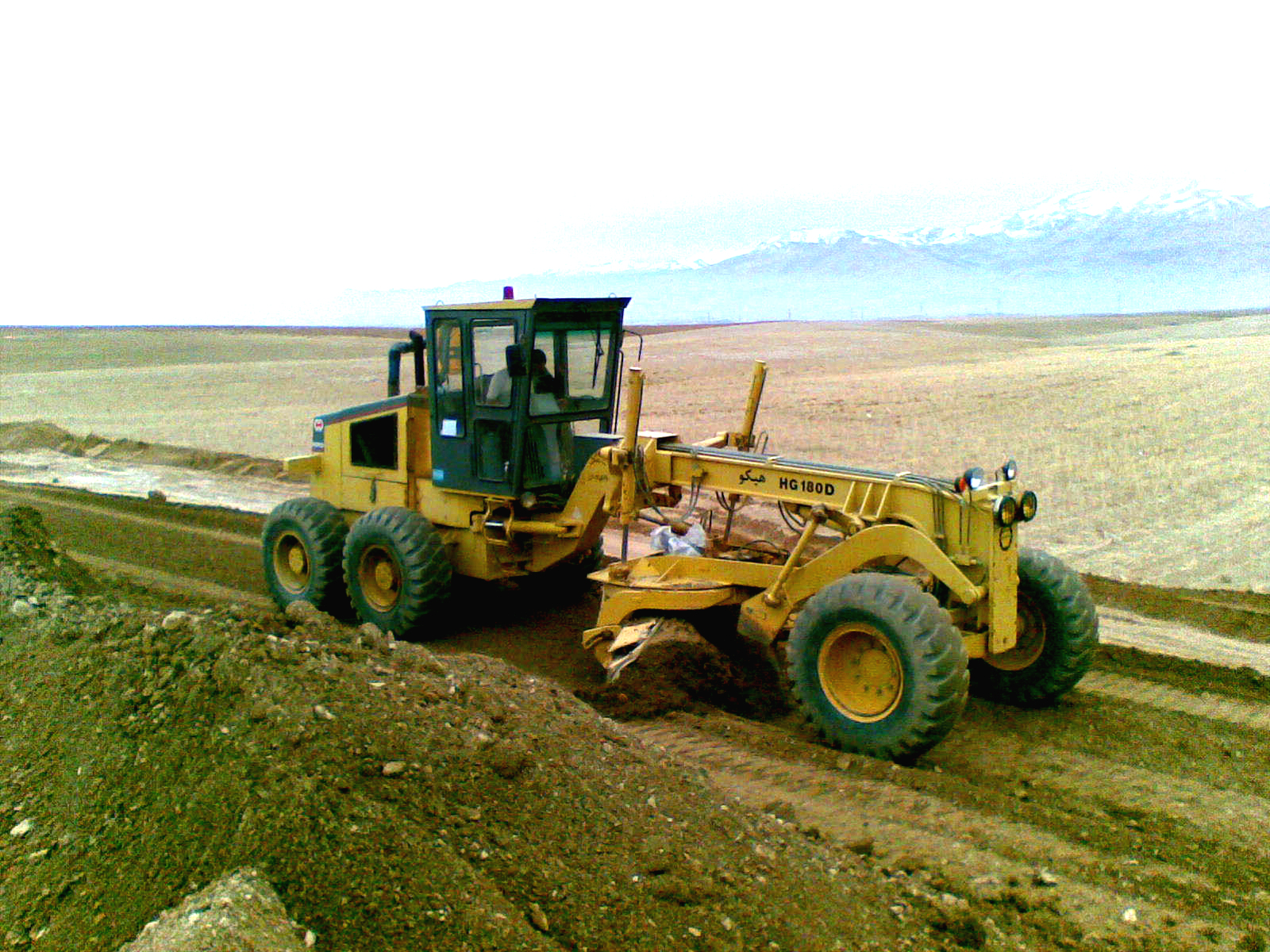
HEPCO motor grader (HG180D1) is working on road construction

Until the early 1950s construction remained in the hands of small domestic companies. Increased income from oil and gas and easy credit triggered a building boom that attracted international construction firms to the country. This growth continued until the mid-1970s when a sharp rise in inflation and a credit squeeze collapsed the boom. The construction industry had revived somewhat by the mid-1980s, although housing shortages and speculation remained serious problems, especially in large urban centers. As of January 2011, the banking sector, particularly Bank Maskan, had loaned up to 102 trillion rials ($10.2 billion) to applicants of Mehr housing scheme. Construction is one of the most important sectors accounting for 20–50% of total private investment in urban areas and was one of the prime investment targets of well-off Iranians.

Annual turnover amounted to $38.4 billion in 2005 and $32.8 billion in 2011. Because of poor construction quality, many buildings need seismic reinforcement or renovation. Iran has a large dam building industry.

==== Mining ====
Mineral production contributed 0.6% of the country's GDP in 2011, a figure that increases to 4% when mining-related industries are included. Gating factors include poor infrastructure, legal barriers, exploration difficulties, and government control over all resources. Iran is ranked among the world's 15 major mineral-rich countries.

Although the petroleum industry provides the majority of revenue, about 75% of all mining sector employees work in mines producing minerals other than oil and natural gas. These include coal, iron ore, copper, lead, zinc, chromium, barite, salt, gypsum, molybdenum, strontium, silica, uranium, and gold, the latter of which is mainly a by-product of the Sar Cheshmeh copper complex operation. The mine at Sar Cheshmeh in Kerman Province is home to the world's second largest store of copper. Large iron ore deposits exist in central Iran, near Bafq, Yazd and Kerman. The government owns 90% of all mines and related industries and is seeking foreign investment. The sector accounts for 3% of exports.

In 2019, the country was the 2nd largest world producer of gypsum; the 8th largest world producer of molybdenum; the world's 8th largest producer of antimony; the 11th largest world producer of iron ore; the 18th largest world producer of sulfur, in addition to being the 21st largest worldwide producer of salt. It was the 13th largest producer in the world of uranium in 2018.

Iran has recoverable coal reserves of nearly 1.9 billion short tonnes. By mid-2008, the country produced about 1.3 million short tonnes of coal annually and consumed about 1.5 million short tonnes, making it a net importer. The country plans to increase hard-coal production to 5 million tons in 2012 from 2 million tons in November 2008.

==== Iron and steel ====
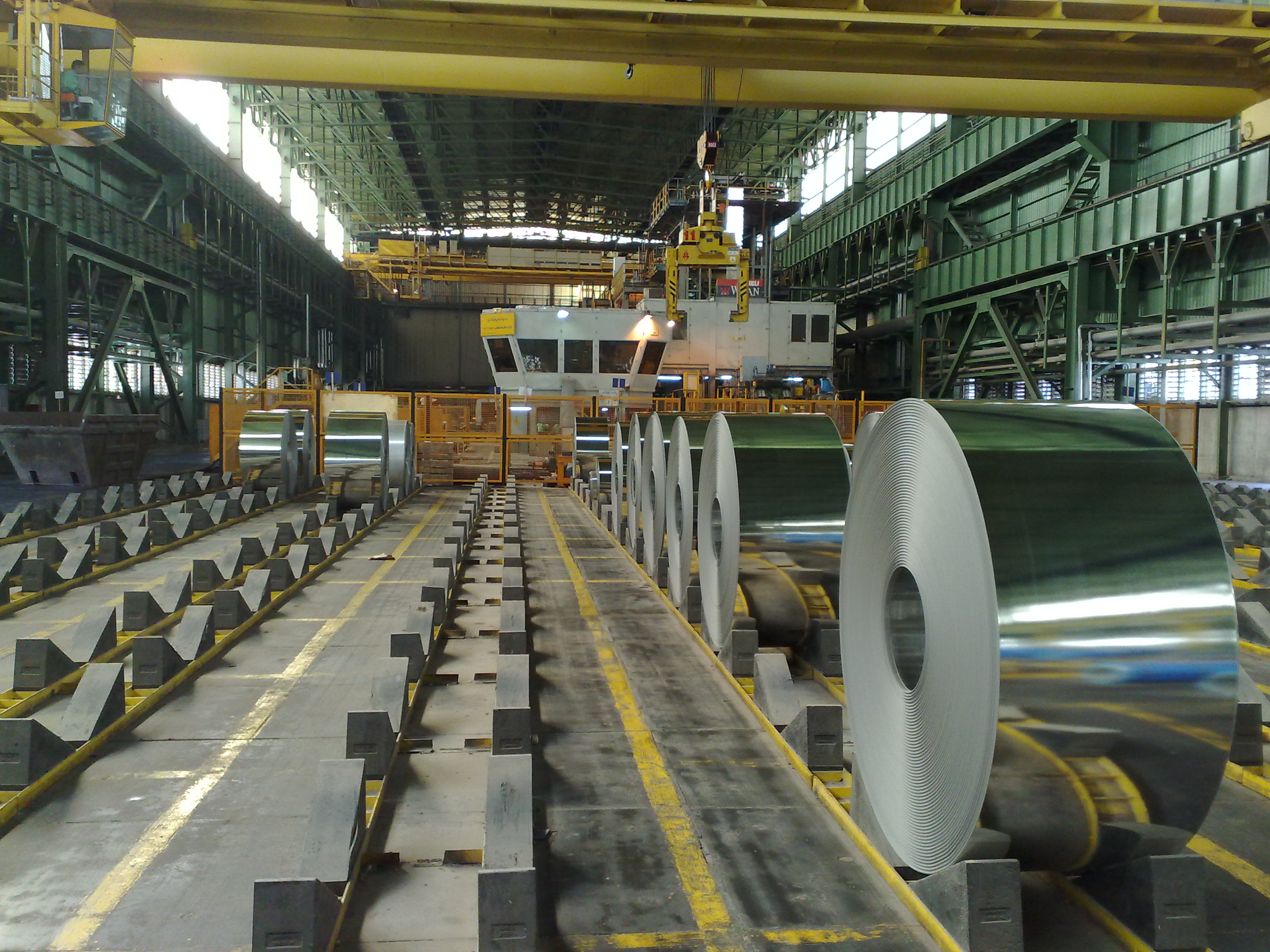
Mobarakeh in Isfahan is Iran's largest steel mill listed on the Tehran Stock Exchange.

Iran's steel industry is a major global producer, featuring key hubs such as Mobarakeh Steel and Khuzestan Steel. The main steel mills are located in Ahvaz, Isfahan and Khuzestan. Iran became self-sufficient in steel in 2009. Aluminum and copper production are projected to hit 245,000 and 383,000 tons respectively by March 2009. Cement production reached 65 million tons in 2009, exporting to 40 countries.

==== Petrochemicals ====
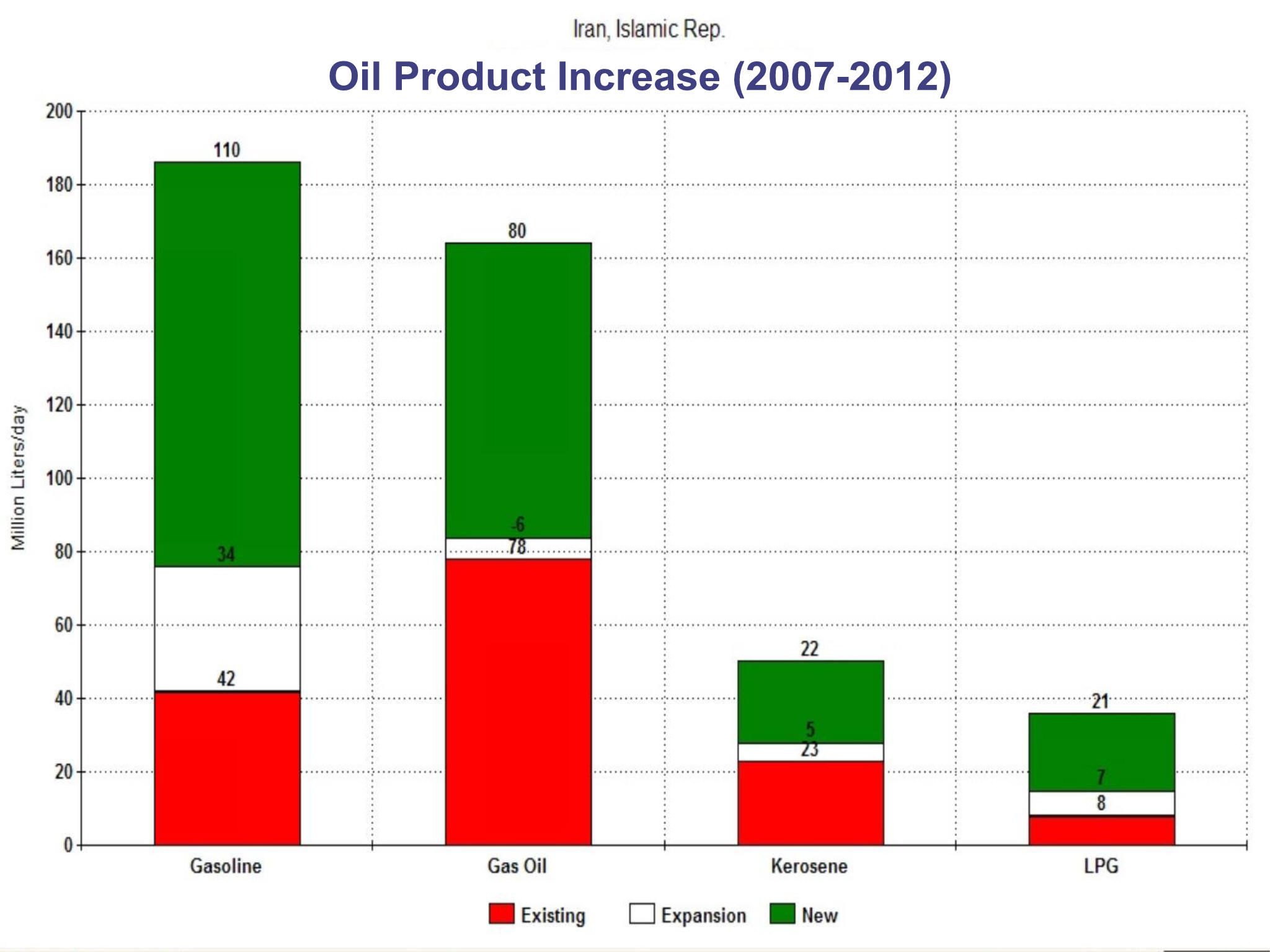
Iran's refining capacity (2007–2013 est.)

Iran manufactures 60–70% of its equipment domestically, including refineries, oil tankers, drilling rigs, offshore platforms, and exploration instruments.

Based on a fertilizer plant in Shiraz, the world's largest ethylene unit, in Asalouyeh, and the completion of other special economic zone projects, Iran's exports in petrochemicals reached $5.5 billion in 2007, $9 billion in 2008 and $7.6 billion during the first ten months of the Iranian calendar year 2010. National Petrochemical Company's output capacity will increase to over 100 million tpa by 2015 from an estimated 50 million tpa in 2010 thus becoming the world' second largest chemical producer globally after Dow Chemical with Iran housing some of the world's largest chemical complexes.

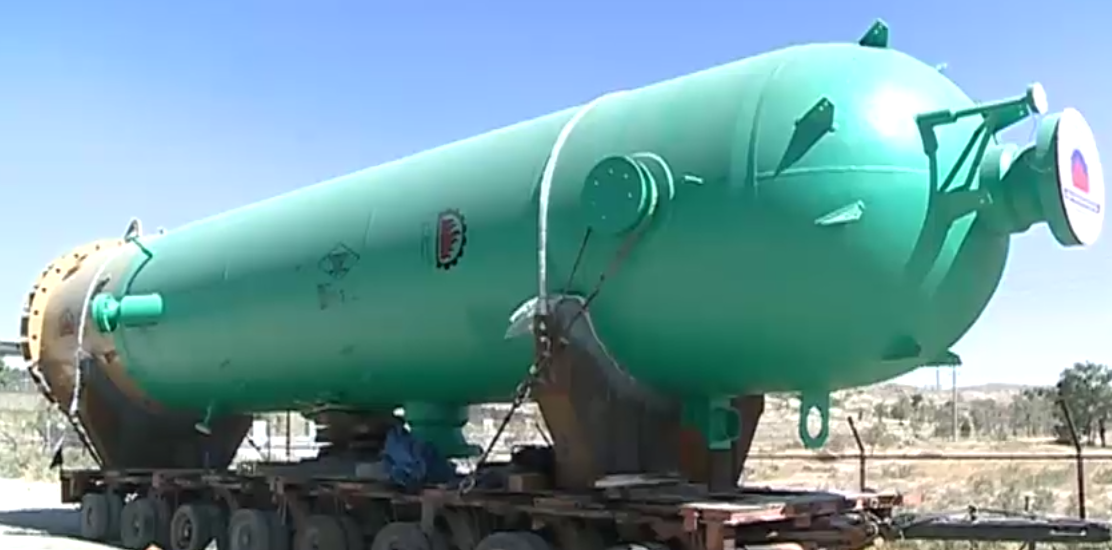
Giant gas reactor of Yadavaran gas refinery designed and manufactured by AzarAb Industries Corporation

Major refineries located at Abadan (site of its first refinery), Kermanshah and Tehran failed to meet domestic demand for gasoline in 2009. Iran's refining industry requires $15 billion in investment over the period 2007–2012 to become self-sufficient and end gasoline imports.

In November 2019, Iran raised the gasoline prices by 50% and imposed a strict rationing system again, as in 2007. The prices per liter gasoline rose to 15,000 rials, where only 60 liters were permitted to private cars for a month. Besides, oil purchase beyond the limit would cost 30,000 rials per liter. Those prices are still well below target prices set in the subsidy reform plan, however. The policy changes came in effect to the US sanctions, and caused protests across the country. The result of the rationing, a year later, was reduced pollution and wasteful domestic consumption and increase in exports.

=== Energy ===
Energy
Electricity:

- production: 258 billion kWh (2014)
- consumption: 218 billion kWh (2014)
- exports: 9.7 billion kWh (2014)
- imports: 3.8 billion kWh (2014)

Electricity – production by source:

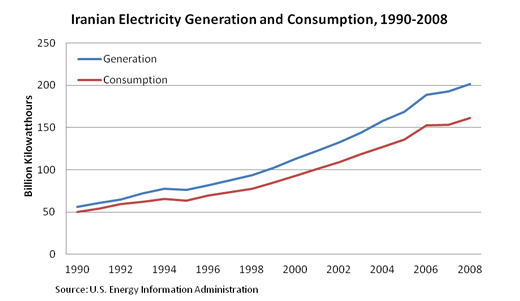
Iran plans to generate 23,000 MW of electricity through nuclear technology by 2025 to meet its increasing demand for energy.

- fossil fuels: 85.6% (2012)
- hydro: 12.4% (2012)
- other: 0.8% (2012)
- nuclear: 1.2% (2012)

Oil:

- production: 3,300,000 bbl/d (520,000 m^{3}/d) (2015)
- exports: 1,042,000 bbl/d (165,700 m^{3}/d) (2013)
- imports: 87,440 bbl/d (13,902 m^{3}/d) (2013)
- proved reserves: 157.8 Gbbl (25.09×10^{9} m^{3}) (2016)

Natural gas:

- production: 174.5 km^{3} (2014)
- consumption: 170.2 km^{3} (2014)
- exports: 9.86 km^{3} (2014)
- imports: 6.886 km^{3} (2014)
- proved reserves: 34,020 km^{3} (2016)

==== Oil and gas industry ====
Countries by natural gas proven reserves, 2014, based on data from The World Factbook. Iran has the world's second largest reserves after Russia

Iran possesses 10% of the world's proven oil reserves and 15% of its gas reserves. Domestic oil and gas along with hydroelectric power facilities provide electical power for its nationwide grids. Energy wastage in Iran amounts to six or seven billion dollars per year, much higher than the international norm. Iran recycles 28% of its used oil and gas, whereas some other countries reprocess up to 60%. In 2008 Iran paid $84 billion in subsidies for oil, gas and electricity. It is the world's third largest consumer of natural gas after United States and Russia. In 2010 Iran completed its first nuclear power plant at Bushehr with Russian assistance.

Iran has been a major oil exporter since 1913. The country's major oil fields lie in the central and southwestern parts of the western Zagros mountains. Oil is also found in northern Iran and in the Persian Gulf. In 1978, Iran was the fourth largest oil producer, OPEC's second largest oil producer and second largest exporter. Following the 1979 revolution the new government reduced production. A further decline in production occurred as result of damage to oil facilities during the Iraq-Iran war.

Oil production rose in the late 1980s as pipelines were repaired and new Persian Gulf fields exploited. By 2004, annual oil production reached 1.4 billion barrels producing a net profit of $50 billion. Iranian Central Bank data show a declining trend in the share of Iranian exports from oil-products (FY 2006: 84.9%, 2007/2008: 86.5%, 2008/2009: 85.5%, 2009/2010: 79.8%, FY 2010 (first three-quarters): 78.9%). Iranian officials estimate that Iran's annual oil and gas revenues could reach $250 billion by 2015 once current projects come on stream.

Pipelines move oil from the fields to the refineries and to such exporting ports as Abadan, Bandar-e Mashur and Kharg Island. Since 1997, Iran's state-owned oil and gas industry has entered into major exploration and production agreements with foreign consortiums. In 2008 the Iranian Oil Bourse (IOB) was inaugurated in Kish Island. The IOB trades petroleum, petrochemicals and gas in various currencies. Trading is primarily in the euro and rial along with other major currencies, not including the US dollar. According to the Petroleum Ministry, Iran plans to invest $500 billion in its oil sector by 2025.

As of August 2025 the crude oil price declined by 15.44% since August 2024. In addition, the International Energy Agency (IEA) says global demand in 2025 is expected to grow by less than 700,000 barrels per day (bpd), while supply is set to rise by 2.5 million bpd— resulting in a surplus of more than 1.8 million bpd and consequently, a further decline in oil price is expected. The decline of oil price is expected to further aggravate Iran's economic situation since Iran is heavily dependent on Chinese refiners that take advantage on Iran's difficulties to sell oil in the global markets.

=== Services ===
Despite 1990s efforts towards economic liberalization, government spending, including expenditure by quasi-governmental foundations, remains high. Estimates of service sector spending in Iran are regularly more than two-fifths of GDP, much government-related, including military expenditures, government salaries, and social security disbursements. Urbanization contributed to service sector growth. Important service industries include public services (including education), commerce, personal services, professional services and tourism.

The total value of transport and communications is expected to rise to $46 billion in nominal terms by 2013, representing 6.8% of Iran's GDP. Projections based on 1996 employment figures compiled for the International Labour Organization suggest that Iran's transport and communications sector employed 3.4 million people, or 20.5% of the labor force in 2008.

==== Retail distribution and hospitality ====
Iran's retail industry consists largely of cooperatives (many of them government-sponsored), and independent retailers operating in bazaars. The bulk of food sales occur at street markets with prices set by the Chief Statistics Bureau. Iran has 438,478 small grocery retailers. These are especially popular in cities other than Tehran where the number of hypermarkets and supermarkets is still very limited. More mini-markets and supermarkets are emerging, mostly independent operations. The biggest chainstores are state-owned Etka, Refah, Shahrvand and Hyperstar Market. Electronic commerce in Iran passed the $1 billion mark in 2009.

In 2012, Iranians spent $77 billion on food, $22 billion on clothes and $18.5 billion on outward tourism. In 2015, overall consumer spending and disposable income are projected at $176.4 billion and $287 billion respectively.

==== Education ====
Flag of the Ministry of Education of Iran

Education in Iran is centralized and divided into K-12 education plus higher education. Elementary and secondary education is supervised by the Ministry of Education and higher education is under the supervision of Ministry of Science, Research and Technology and Ministry of Health and Medical Education for medical sciences. As of 2016, around 94% of the Iranian adult population is literate. This rate increases to 97% among young adults ages between 15 and 24 without any gender consideration. By 2007, Iran had a student-to-workforce population ratio of 10.2%, standing among the countries with the highest ratio in the world.

Primary school (Dabestân, دبستان) starts at the age of 6 for a duration of six years. Junior high school (Dore-ye Avval-e Dabirestân دوره اول دبیرستان), also known as middle school, includes three years of Dabirestân from the seventh to the ninth grade. Senior high school (Dore-ye Dovom-e Dabirestân, دوره دوم دبیرستان), including the last three years, is mandatory. The student at this level can study theoretical, vocational/technical, or manual fields, each program with its specialties. Ultimately, students are given a high school diploma. The requirement to enter into higher education is to have a high school diploma, and passing the national university entrance examination, Iranian University Entrance Exam (Konkur کنکور), which is similar to the French baccalauréat exam (for most of universities and fields of study). Iran suffers from a problem of over education and falsified academic degrees.

Universities, institutes of technology, medical schools and community colleges provide the higher education. Higher education is sectioned by different levels of diplomas: Fogh-e-Diplom or Kārdāni after two years of higher education, Kārshenāsi (also known under the name "license") is delivered after four years of higher education (bachelor's degree). Kārshenāsi-ye Arshad is delivered after two more years of study (master's degree). After which, another exam allows the candidate to pursue a doctoral program (Ph.D.).

The Human Rights Measurement Initiative (HRMI) finds that Iran is fulfilling only 91.0% of what it should fulfill for the right to education based on the country's income level. HRMI breaks down the right to education by examining the rights to both primary and secondary education. While considering Iran's income level, the nation is achieving 99.2% of what should be possible based on its resources (income) for primary education but only 82.9% for secondary education.

==== Healthcare and pharmaceuticals ====
IRAN: Healthcare (Source: EIU)	2005	2006	2007	2008	2009	2010
Life expectancy, average (years)	70.0	70.3	70.6	70.9	71.1	71.4
Healthcare spending (% of GDP)	4.2	4.2	4.2	4.2	4.2	4.2
Healthcare spending ($ per head)	113	132	150	191	223	261

The constitution entitles Iranians to basic universal health care. By 2008, 73% of Iranians were covered by the voluntary national health insurance system. Although over 85% of the population use an insurance system to cover their drug expenses, the government heavily subsidizes pharmaceutical production/importation. The total market value of Iran's health and medical sector was $24 billion in 2002 and was forecast to rise to $50 billion by 2013. Iran's pharmaceutical industry is a major domestic sector producing roughly 95% of the country's medicine supply, characterized by high generic self-sufficiency and localized biopharmaceutical growth. In 2006, 55 pharmaceutical companies in Iran produced 96% (quantitatively) of the medicines for a market worth $1.2 billion. Major firms such as Darou Pakhsh, Sobhan Darou and Cinnagen handle large-scale generic formulations alongside advanced biosimilars for immunology, cancers and chronic conditions. This figure is projected to increase to $3.65 billion by 2013.

According to Hataminia, S., & Mohammadzadeh Asl, N. (2025), the deteriorating economic indicator of Iran especially, inflation and unemployment rates exert significant negative effects on life expectancy.

==== Tourism ====
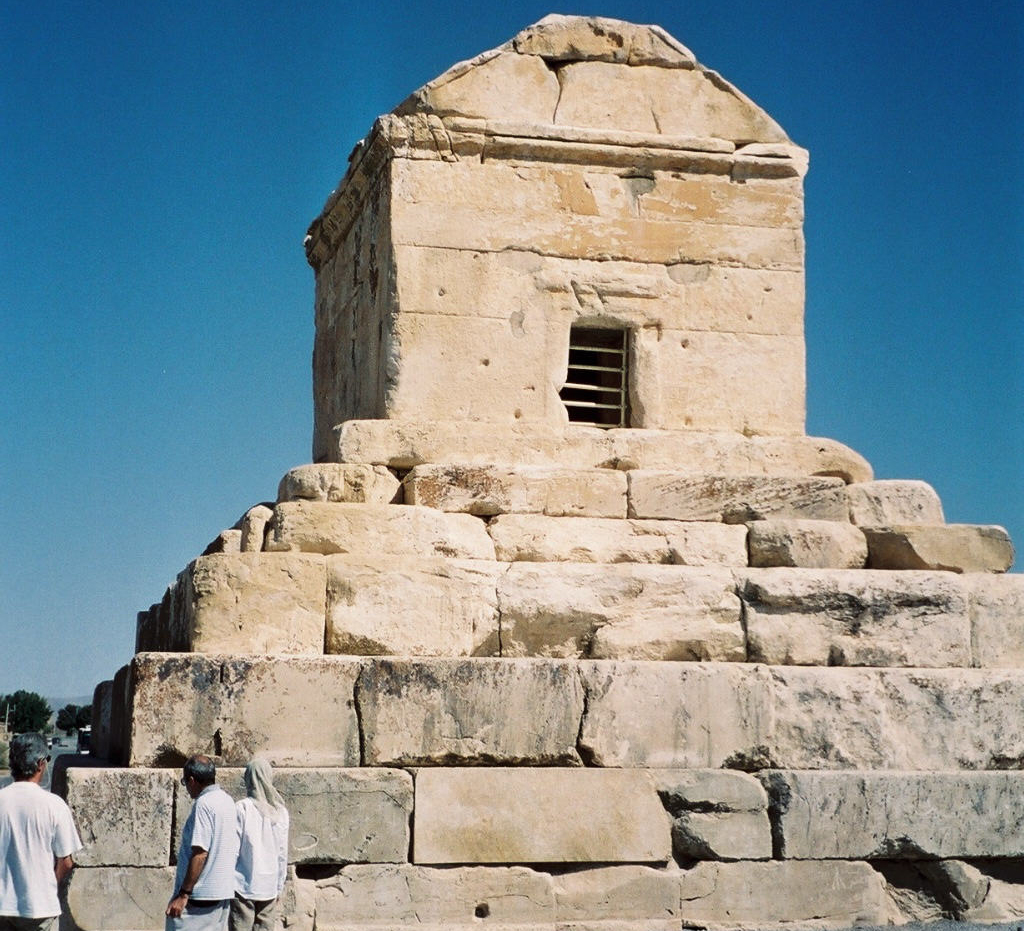
Cyrus' tomb lies in Pasargadae. Iran is home to 30 historic sites which have been inscribed on UNESCO World Heritage List.

Although tourism declined significantly during the war with Iraq, it has subsequently recovered. About 1,659,000 foreign tourists visited Iran in 2004 and 2.3 million in 2009 mostly from Asian countries, including the republics of Central Asia, while about 10% came from the European Union and North America.

The most popular tourist destinations are Mazandaran, Isfahan, Mashhad and Shiraz. In the early 2000s the industry faced serious limitations in infrastructure, communications, industry standards and personnel training. Several organized tours from Germany, France and other European countries come to Iran annually to visit archaeological sites and monuments. In 2003 Iran ranked 68th in tourism revenues worldwide. According to UNESCO and the deputy head of research for Iran Travel and Tourism Organization (ITTO), Iran is rated among the "10 most touristic countries in the world". Domestic tourism in Iran is one of the largest in the world.

==== Banking, finance and insurance ====
Government loans and credits are available to industrial and agricultural projects, primarily through banks. Iran's unit of currency is the rial which had an average official exchange rate of 9,326 rials to the U.S. dollar in 2007. Rials are exchanged on the unofficial market at a higher rate. In 1979, the government nationalized private banks. The restructured banking system replaced interest on loans with handling fees, in accordance with Islamic law. This system took effect in the mid-1980s.

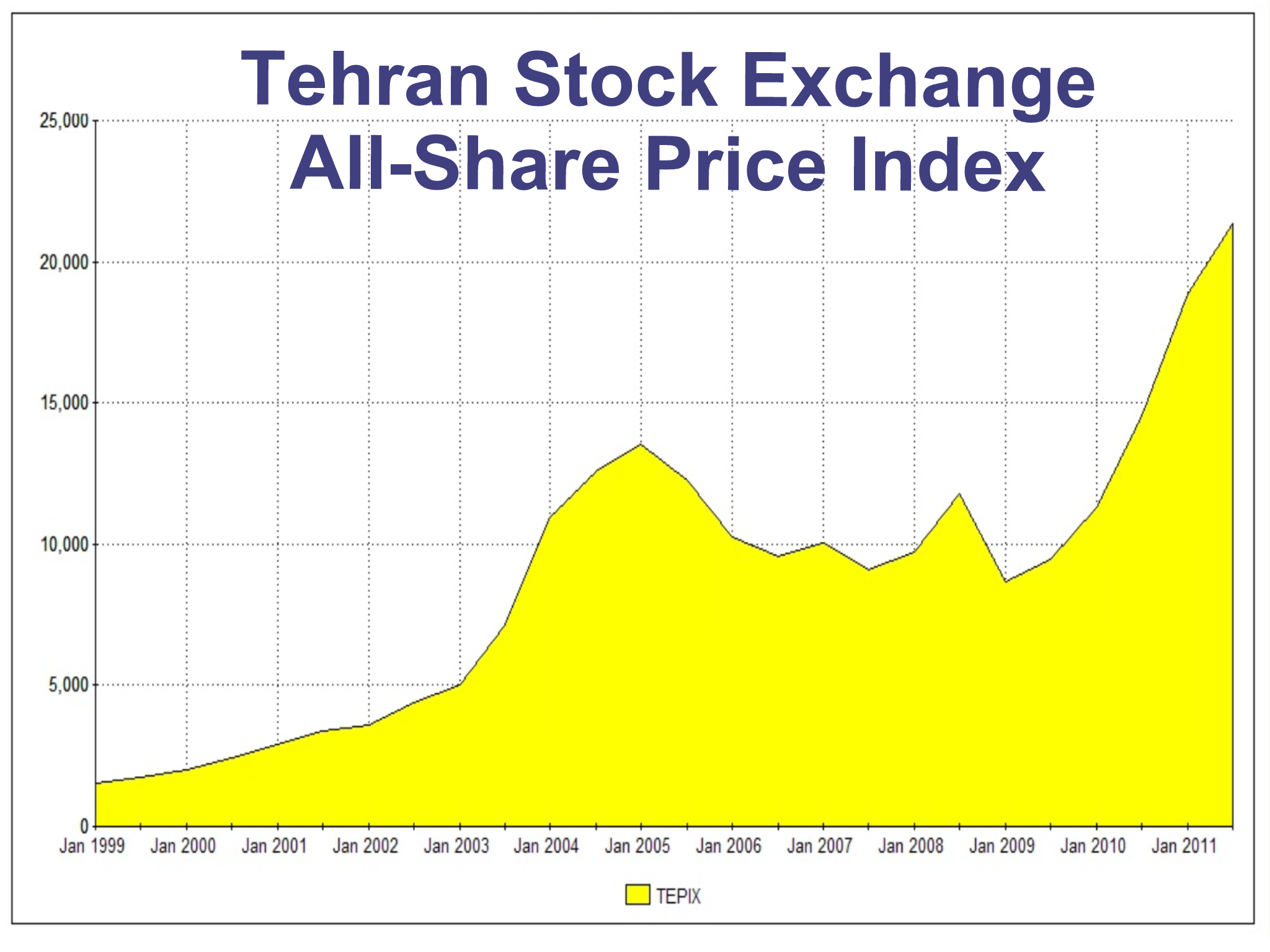
The Tehran Stock Exchange was one of the world's best performing stock exchanges between 1999 and 2011.

The banking system consists of a central bank, the Bank Markazi, which issues currency and oversees all state and private banks, as well as the Organization of Islamic Economics which acts as a sort of central bank for issuing Qard al-Hasan, as a parallel system in the banking sector, operating outside the purview of the Central Bank. It supervises 1200, out of 2500 Islamic loan funds, on behalf of Iran's Central Bank. Several commercial banks have branches throughout the country. Two development banks exist and a housing bank specializes in home mortgages. The government began to privatize the banking sector in 2001 when licenses were issued to two new privately owned banks.

State-owned commercial banks predominantly make loans to the state, bonyad enterprises, large-scale private firms and four thousand wealthy/connected individuals. While most Iranians have difficulty obtaining small home loans, 90 individuals secured facilities totaling $8 billion. In 2009, Iran's General Inspection Office announced that Iranian banks held some $38 billion of delinquent loans, with capital of only $20 billion.

Foreign transactions with Iran amounted to $150 billion of major contracts between 2000 and 2007, including private and government lines of credit.

As of 2010, the Tehran Stock Exchange traded the shares of more than 330 registered companies. Listed companies were valued at $100 billion in 2011.

Insurance premiums accounted for just under 1% of GDP in 2008, a figure partly attributable to low average income per head. Five state-owned insurance firms dominate the market, four of which are active in commercial insurance. The leading player is the Iran Insurance Company, followed by Asia, Alborz and Dana insurances. In 2001/02 third-party liability insurance accounted for 46% of premiums, followed by health insurance (13%), fire insurance (10%) and life insurance (9.9%).

==== Communications, electronics and IT ====
Broadcast media, including five national radio stations and five national television networks as well as dozens of local radio and television stations are run by the government. In 2008, there were 345 telephone lines and 106 personal computers for every 1,000 residents. Personal computers for home use became more affordable in the mid-1990s, since when demand for Internet access has increased rapidly. As of 2010, Iran also had the world's third largest number of bloggers (2010).

In 1998, the Ministry of Post, Telegraph & Telephone, later renamed the Ministry of Information & Communication Technology, began selling Internet accounts to the general public. In 2006, revenues from the Iranian telecom industry were estimated at $1.2 billion. In 2006, Iran had 1,223 Internet Service Providers (ISPs), all private sector operated. As of 2014, Iran has the largest mobile market in the Middle East, with 83.2 million mobile subscriptions and 8 million smart-phones in 2012.

According to the World Bank, Iran's information and communications technology sector had a 1.4% share of GDP in 2008. Around 150,000 people work in this sector, including 20,000 in the software industry. 1,200 IT companies were registered in 2002, 200 in software development. In 2014 software exports stood at $400 million. By the end of 2009, Iran's telecom market was the fourth-largest in the Middle East at $9.2 billion and was expected to reach $12.9 billion by 2014 at a compound annual growth rate of 6.9%.

==== Transport ====
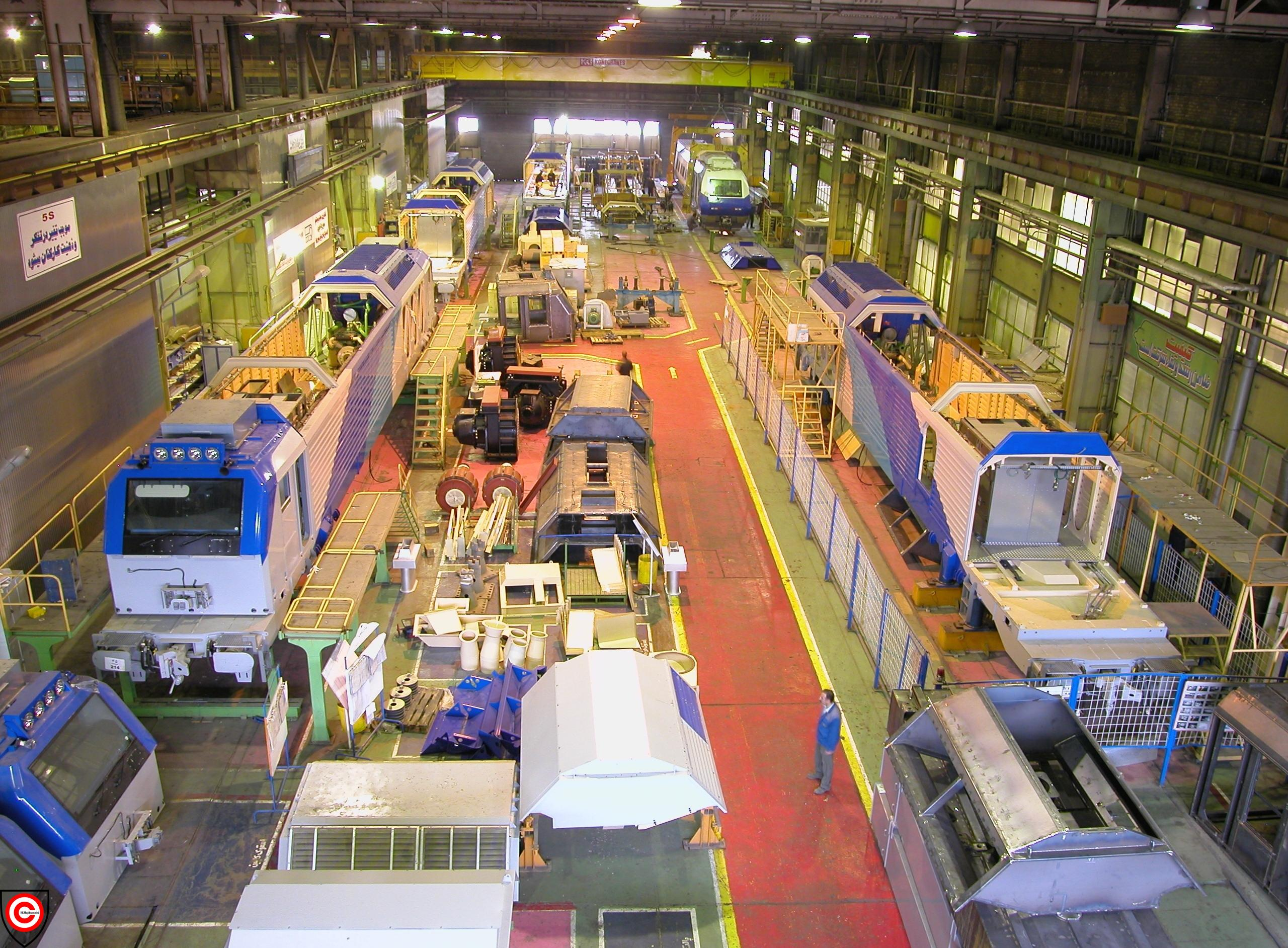
Locomotive production line of Wagon Pars company

Iran has an extensive paved road system linking most towns and all cities. In 2011, the country had 173,000 kilometres (107,000 mi) of roads, of which 73% were paved. In 2007 there were approximately 100 passenger cars for every 1,000 inhabitants. Trains operated on 11,106 kilometres (6,901 mi) of track.

Iran's major port of entry is Bandar-Abbas on the Strait of Hormuz. After arriving in Iran, imported goods are distributed by trucks and freight trains. The Tehran–Bandar-Abbas railroad, opened in 1995, connects Bandar-Abbas to Central Asia via Tehran and Mashhad. Other major ports include Bandar Anzali and Bandar Torkaman on the Caspian Sea and Khoramshahr and Bandar Imam Khomeini on the Persian Gulf.

Dozens of cities have passenger and cargo airports. Iran Air, the national airline, was founded in 1962 and operates domestic and international flights. All large cities have bus transit systems and private companies provide intercity bus services. Tehran, Mashhad, Shiraz, Tabriz, Ahvaz and Isfahan are constructing underground railways. More than one million people work in the transportation sector, accounting for 9% of 2008 GDP.

In August 2022, President Ebrahim Raisi's cabinet approved a law to import fully assembled foreign cars. His predecessor President Hassan Rouhani, had outlawed such imports in July 2018 due to sanctions imposed on Iran. Regular Iranian citizens were unable to buy safe cars at affordable prices.

=== Water supply and sanitation ===
Water supply and sanitation in Iran is overseen by the Ministry of Energy, which sets policy and supervises the provision of services. The renewable water per capita in 2025 for each Iranian has decreased to less than 500 cubic meters per year, whereas this figure was previously 1,500 cubic meters.

== International trade ==
Exports of Iran by product category (2019) Chemical products Transportation Machines Mineral products Plastics and rubbers Metals Foodstuffs Precious metals Textiles Instruments Animal products Vegetable products Paper goods Footwear and headwear Miscellaneous Stone and glass Wood products Animal and vegetable bi-products Animal hides Arts and antiques Weapons

Iran is a founding member of the OPEC cartel and the Organization of Gas Exporting Countries. Petroleum constitutes 56% of Iran's exports with a value of $60.2 billion in 2018. For the first time, the value of Iran's non-oil exports is expected to reach the value of imports at $43 billion in 2011. Pistachios, liquefied propane, methanol (methyl alcohol), hand-woven carpets and automobiles are the major non-oil exports. Copper, cement, leather, textiles, fruits, saffron and caviar are also export items of Iran.

Technical and engineering service exports in FY 2007 were $2.7 billion of which 40% of technical services went to Central Asia and the Caucasus, 30% ($350 million) to Iraq, and close to 20% ($205 million) to Africa.

Iranian firms have developed energy, pipelines, irrigation, dams and power generation in different countries. The country has made non-oil exports a priority by expanding its broad industrial base, educated and motivated workforce and favorable location, which gives it proximity to an estimated market of some 300 million people in Caspian, Persian Gulf and some ECO countries further east.

Total import volume rose by 189% from $13.7 billion in 2000 to $39.7 billion in 2005 and $55.189 billion in 2009. Iran's major commercial partners are China, France, Germany, India, Italy, Japan, Russia, and South Korea. From 1950 until 1978, the United States was Iran's foremost economic and military partner, playing a major role in infrastructure and industry modernization. It is reported that around 80% of machinery and equipment in Iran is of German origin. In March 2018, Iran had banned Dollar in trade. In July 2018, France, Germany and the UK agreed to continue trade with Iran without using Dollar as a medium of exchange.

Since the mid-1990s, Iran has increased its economic cooperation with other developing countries in "South–South integration" including Syria, India, China, South Africa, Cuba, and Venezuela. Iran's trade with India passed $13 billion in 2007, an 80% increase within a year. Iran is expanding its trade ties with Turkey and Pakistan and shares with its partners the common objective to create a common market in West and Central Asia through ECO.

Since 2003, Iran has increased investment in neighboring countries such as Iraq and Afghanistan. In Dubai, UAE, it is estimated that Iranian expatriates handle over 20% of its domestic economy and account for an equal proportion of its population. Migrant Iranian workers abroad remitted less than $2 billion home in 2006. Between 2005 and 2009, trade between Dubai and Iran tripled to $12 billion; money invested in the local real estate market and import-export businesses, collectively known as the Bazaar, and geared towards providing Iran and other countries with required consumer goods. It is estimated that one third of Iran's imported goods and exports are delivered through the black market, underground economy, and illegal jetties, thus damaging the economy.

=== Current accounts ===
Iran had an estimated $110 billion in foreign reserves in 2011 and balances its external payments by pricing oil at approximately $75 per barrel. As of 2013, only $30 to $50 billion of those reserves are accessible because of current sanctions. Iranian media has questioned the reason behind Iran's government non-repatriation of its foreign reserves before the imposition of the latest round of sanctions and its failure to convert into gold. As a consequence, the Iranian rial lost more than 40% of its value between December 2011 and April 2012.

The current account was expected to reach a surplus of 2.1% of GDP in FY 2012, and the net fiscal balance (after payments to Iran's National Development Fund) will register a surplus of 0.3% of GDP. In 2013 the external debts stood at $7.2 billion down from $17.3 billion in 2012. Overall fiscal deficit is expected to deteriorate to 2.7% of GDP in FY 2016 from 1.7% in 2015.

Money in circulation reached $700 billion in March 2020 (based on the 2017 pre-devaluation exchange rate), thus furthering the decline of the Iranian rial and rise in inflation.

=== Foreign direct investment ===
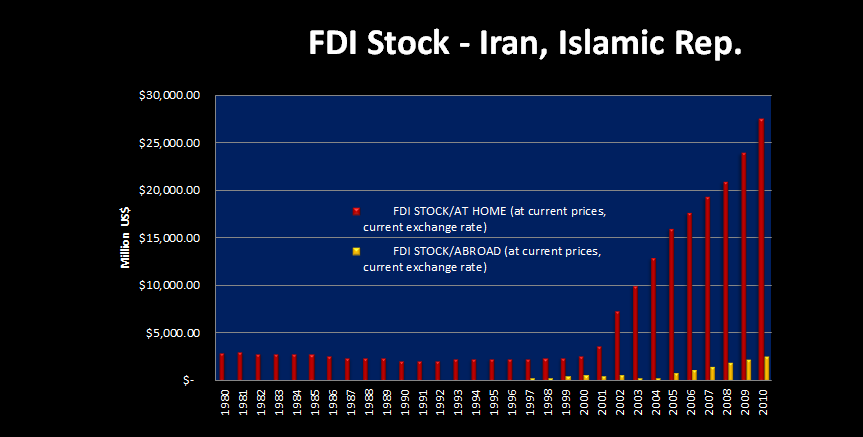
FDI stock in Iran (1980–2010)

In the 1990s and early 2000s, indirect oilfield development agreements were made with foreign firms, including buyback contracts in the oil sector whereby the contractor provided project finance in return for an allocated production share. Operation transferred to National Iranian Oil Company (NIOC) after a set number of years, completing the contract.

Unfavorable or complex operating requirements and international sanctions have hindered foreign investment in the country, despite liberalization of relevant regulations in the early 2000s. Iran absorbed $24.3 billion of foreign investment between the Iranian calendar years 1993 and 2007. The EIU estimates that Iran's net FDI will rise by 100% between 2010 and 2014.

Foreign investors concentrated their activities in the energy, vehicle manufacture, copper mining, construction, utilities, petrochemicals, clothing, food and beverages, telecom and pharmaceuticals sectors. Iran is a member of the World Bank's Multilateral Investment Guarantee Agency. In 2006, the combined net worth of Iranian citizens abroad was about 1.3 trillion dollars.

According to the head of the Organization for Investment, Economic and Technical Assistance of Iran (OIETAI), in 2008 Iran ranked 142 among 181 countries in working conditions. Iran stands at number 96 in terms of business start-ups, 165 in obtaining permits, 147 in employment, 147 in asset registration, 84 in obtaining credit, 164 in legal support for investments, 104 in tax payments, 142 in overseas trade, 56 in contract feasibility and 107 in bankruptcy. Firms from over 50 countries invested in Iran between 1992 and 2008, with Asia and Europe the largest participants as shown below:

Continent of origin	Leading countries investing in Iran (1992–2008)	Number of projects	Total amount invested
Asia	India, United Arab Emirates (UAE), Singapore, Indonesia and Oman	190	$11.6 billion
Europe	Germany, the Netherlands, Spain, UK, Turkey, Italy and France (20 countries in total)	253	$10.9 billion
Americas	Canada, Panama, the US and Jamaica	7	$1.4 billion
Africa	Mauritius, Liberia and South Africa	—N/a	$8 billion
Australia	Australia	1	$682 million

The economic impact of a partial lifting of sanctions extends beyond the energy sector; The New York Times reported that "consumer-oriented companies, in particular, could find opportunity in this country with 81 million consumers, many of whom are young and prefer Western products". The consumer-goods market is expected to grow by $100 billion by 2020.

In 2015, Iran was considered "a strong emerging market play" by investment and trading firms. Opening Iran's market place to foreign investment could also be a boon to competitive multinational firms operating in a variety of manufacturing and service sectors, worth $600 billion to $800 billion in new investment opportunities over the next decade.

=== Foreign currency reserves ===
In the 2000s, during high oil prices, Iran's central bank built up reserves well above $100 billion. However, sanctions after 2012 cut Iran's access to much of its money (funds accumulated from oil sales in countries like China, India, South Korea were locked or could only be used for limited purchases). In 2018, when the U.S. reimposed banking sanctions, Iran's usable reserves shrank dramatically – at one point in 2020, the IMF estimated Iran had as little as $4 billion in accessible reserves (excluding gold and illiquid assets). After 2021, higher oil exports to China allowed some rebuilding of reserves. By late 2024, Iran's total international reserves (including gold and deposits abroad) were estimated at $26 billion, rising to a projected $34 billion in 2025 as per IMF data – though not all of that is readily deployable.

Lack of reserve access has contributed to Iran's currency volatility; the central bank has limited ability to intervene in the open market with dollars or euros. In late 2023, a deal with the U.S. allowed Iran to repatriate about $6 billion of its funds from South Korea (in exchange for a prisoner release), but those funds were designated for humanitarian trade only. Iran's oil export revenue (mostly in yuan from China) is partly kept offshore to finance imports from those countries.

Facing this, the Central Bank of Iran has tried tactics like currency swap agreements with allies, efforts to ditch the U.S. dollar in trade (using barter or currencies like yuan/rouble), and even reportedly buying cryptocurrencies as alternative reserve assets. In 2022, the bank also raised interest rates and banned private exchange trading for a period to slow capital flight. Yet capital flight persisted – an estimated $14 billion left Iran in 2024 and $20 billion in 2023 as people sought safer assets abroad, reflecting low confidence in the rial.

=== International sanctions ===
After the Iranian Revolution in 1979, the United States ended its economic and diplomatic ties with Iran, banned Iranian oil imports and froze approximately $11 billion of its assets. In 1996, the U.S. Government passed the Iran and Libya Sanctions Act (ILSA) which prohibits U.S. (and non-U.S.) companies from investing and trading with Iran in amounts of more than $20 million annually. Since 2000 exceptions to this restriction have been made for items including pharmaceuticals and medical equipment.

Iran's nuclear program has been the subject of contention with the West since 2006 over suspicions of its intentions. The UN Security Council imposed sanctions against select companies linked to the nuclear program, thus furthering the country's economic isolation. Sanctions notably bar nuclear, missile and many military exports to Iran and target investments in oil, gas and petrochemicals, exports of refined petroleum products, as well as the Islamic Revolutionary Guard Corps, banks, insurance, financial transactions and shipping.

In 2012, the European Union tightened its own sanctions by joining the three-decade-old US oil embargo against Iran. In 2015, Iran and the P5+1 reached a deal on the nuclear program that will remove the main sanctions by early 2016. Even though Iran can trade in its own currency some problems subsist mainly due to the fact that it cannot transact in US dollars freely. Given its large reserves of oil and gas, the Iranian rial could become a world reserve currency if parity is established with oil and gas.

In 2018, the United States government unilaterally withdrew from the JCPOA agreement and re-imposed its sanctions on Iran's oil sales, petrochemicals, shipping, metals trading and banking transactions.

==== Effects ====
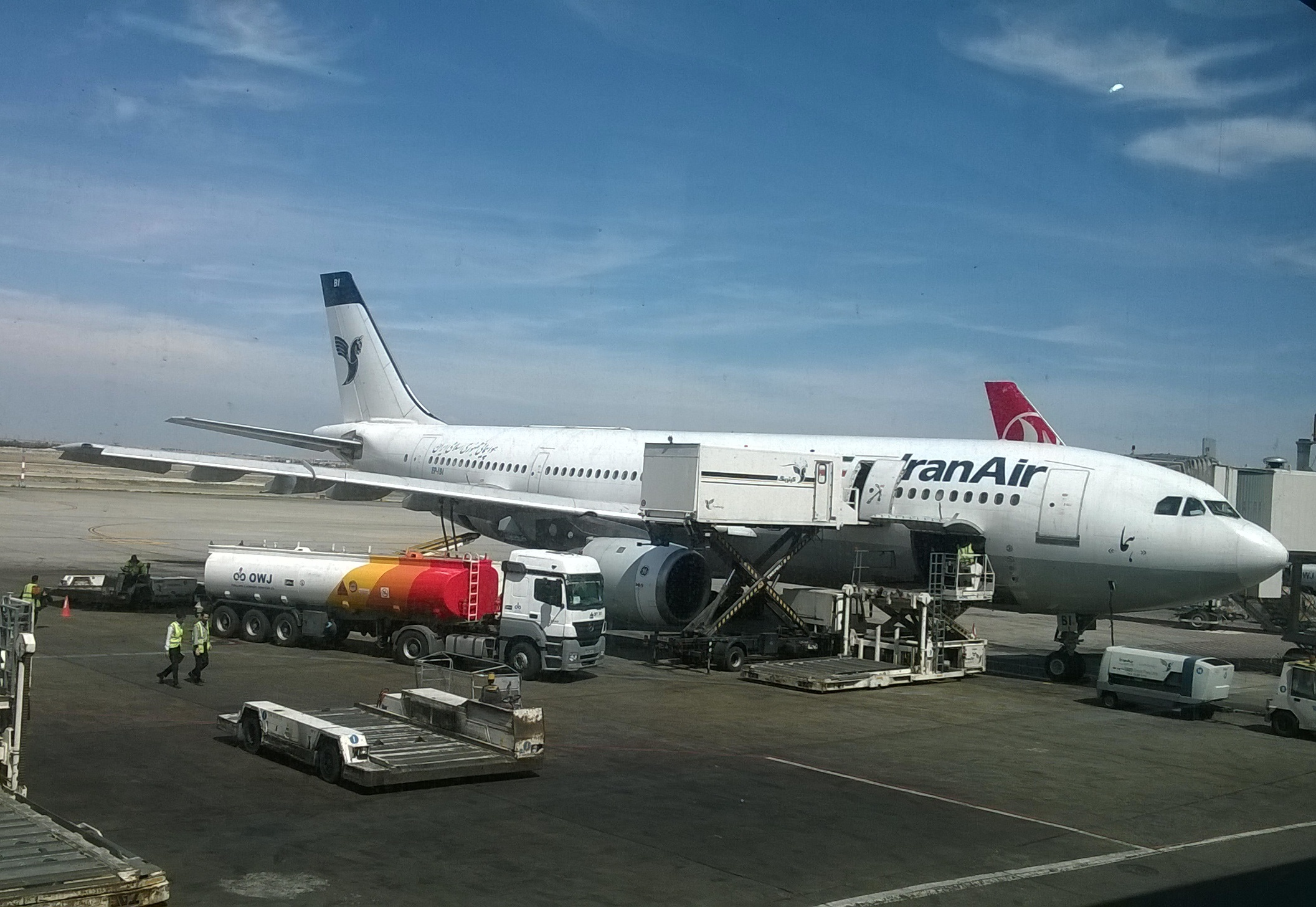
The Joint Comprehensive Plan of Action allows Iran to purchase new planes.

According to U.S. Undersecretary of State William J. Burns, Iran may be losing as much as $60 billion annually in energy investment. Sanctions are making imports 24% more costly on average. In addition, the latest round of sanctions could cost Iran annually $50 billion in lost oil revenues. Iran is increasingly using barter trade because its access to the international dollar payment system has been denied. According to Iranian officials, large-scale withdrawal by international companies represents an "opportunity" for domestic companies to replace them.

The IEA estimated that Iranian exports fell to a record of 860,000 bpd in September 2012 from 2.2 million bpd at the end of 2011. This fall led to a drop in revenues and clashes on the streets of Tehran when the local currency, the rial, collapsed. September 2012 output was Iran's lowest since 1988.

The economic impacts of sanctions have been severe. Based on research, the sanctions resulted in welfare losses across all income groups in Iran, with wealthier groups suffering greater losses compared to poorer groups. Additionally, income concentration and share within top income groups declined post-sanctions.

According to the U.S. Iran could reduce the world price of crude petroleum by 10%, saving the United States annually $76 billion (at the proximate 2008 world oil price of $100/bbl).

According to NIAC, sanctions cost the United States over $175 billion in lost trade and 279,000 lost job opportunities. Between 2010 and 2012, sanctions cost the E.U. states more than twice as much as the United States in terms of lost trade revenue. Germany was hit the hardest, losing between $23.1 and $73.0 billion between 2010 and 2012, with Italy and France following at $13.6–$42.8 billion and $10.9–$34.2 billion respectively.

GDP growth turned negative in 2013 (−5%). The unofficial unemployment rate was 20% by mid-2012. Oil exports dropped to 1.4 million bpd in 2014 from 2.5 million bpd in 2011. By 2013, Iran had $80 billion in foreign exchange reserves frozen overseas. Automobile production declined 40% between 2011 and 2013. According to the U.S. government in 2015, Iran's economy has reached a point where it is "fundamentally incapable of recovery" without a nuclear accommodation with the West.

The tentative rapprochement between Iran and the US, which began in the second half of 2013, has the potential to become a world-changing development, and unleash tremendous geopolitical and economic opportunities, if it is sustained […] if Iran and the US were to achieve a diplomatic breakthrough, geopolitical tensions in the Middle East could decline sharply, and Iran could come to be perceived as a promising emerging market in its own right.

In January 2019, President Hassan Rouhani blamed the US for Iran's declining economy. Following the US pullout from an international nuclear deal with Iran and re-imposed sanctions, Iran faced the toughest economic situation in 40 years. According to Majlis, this has caused damages estimated between 150 and 200 billion dollars to the Iranian economy.

In August 2024, an Iranian group called IRLeaks attacked Iranian banks. Politico described the attack as the "worst cyberattack" in Iranian history. According to Politico, the Iranian government was forced to pay millions of dollars to IRLeaks in ransom. Politico reported that 20 out of about 29 Iranian credit institutions fell in the attack. The Iranian supreme leader blamed Israel and the United States without mentioning the cyberattack on the banking system. Politico remarked it was plausible Israel or the US were involved because of tensions with Israel as well as the Americans having accused Iran of intervening in the American 2024 elections. Politico also remarked that the group was made of freelance hackers and the attack was likely carried out for monetary gain. TechCentral said the attack was probably carried out by freelance hackers. An Iranian firm paid the hackers no less than $3 million to stop the attack and retrieve data.

== Humanitarian aspects ==
The U.S. sanctions against Iran are accompanied by negative humanitarian impacts. According to international law, the United States must assess the impact of its sanctions on Iranians' rights and address any breaches caused by sanctions. Because of the vast network of US sanctions, banks and firms have withdrawn from humanitarian trade with Iran, leaving Iranians with rare or severe diseases unable to obtain the medicine and treatments needed.In general The devastating effects of sanctions directly and indirectly on health have significantly reduced financial and physical access to drugs and medical equipment in Iran, leading to a substantial decline in public health.

According to Alena Douhan, the U.N. special rapporteur on unilateral coercive measures, the groups including "[people with] severe diseases, disabled people, Afghan refugees, women-led households and children" are adversely affected by the measures. She added that "sanctions have been substantially exacerbating the humanitarian situation in Iran."

== Nuclear program spending ==
The Iranian regime spent more than US$9 billion on Iran's nuclear program over the last three decades. The efforts to develop the nuclear program were accompanied by threats to destroy Israel, which resulted in heavy sanctions that were imposed on Iran and consequently, heavy indirect cost. The indirect cost of the nuclear program are estimated to be US$3 trillion. Iran lost more than US$450 billion in oil revenues, more than US$100 billion in lost of foreign investment, and the Iranian Rial has been devaluated in more than 95%.

Much of the investment was evaporated as a result of Twelve-Day War, which resulted in a destruction of large parts of Iran's nuclear program, including the destruction of facilities like the nuclear facilities in Natanz and Fordow as well as assassination of nuclear scientists.

== See also ==
- Economy of Tehran
- List of companies of Iran
- List of Iranians by net worth
- List of economic laws in Iran
- Foreign relations of Iran
- Smuggling in Iran
- Water scarcity in Iran
