= 2007 gasoline rationing plan in Iran =

The 2007 gasoline rationing plan in Iran was launched by president Mahmoud Ahmadinejad's cabinet to reduce that country's fuel consumption. Although Iran is one of the world's largest producers of petroleum, rapid increases in demand and limited refining capacity have forced the country to import about 40% of its gasoline, at an annual cost of up to US$7 billion.

The fuel rationing originally triggered discontent in Iran, but, according to analysts quoted in the Western news media, the Iranian government hoped reducing gasoline imports would help insulate the country from international pressure related to its nuclear program. "We will greatly suffer if they (foreign countries) suddenly decide not to sell us fuel," said Iranian political analyst Saeed Leylaz." In an interview, Iranian president Mahmoud Ahmadinejad said: "They [Americans] had a plan and idea that is neutralized. They don't know our nation. They think if they refuse to provide us with gasoline, our nation would say we don't want nuclear energy."

== Background ==
An increase in population since 1980 from 40 to 68 million people had pushed Iran’s gasoline consumption up by nearly 13 percent annually over five years. As a result, the country consumed far more gasoline than its refineries can provide. Production stood at 10.5 million US gallons (40,000 m^{3}) a day, compared with daily demand standing at 18.5 million US gallons (70,000 m^{3}). With 43 percent of its gasoline imported, Iran is the world’s second largest gasoline importer.

Iran's petrol is heavily subsidized, sold at about a fifth of its real cost. The price of 1,000 rials ($0.11) per liter makes Iran one of the cheapest countries in the world for motorists. The government maintains that the rich benefit from 70 percent of subsidies and that it is one of the primary reasons for changing the subsidies system.

== Gas rationing plan ==
Iran took action to reduce its dependence on foreign gasoline through a three-pronged strategy which includes:

- Significant expansion of Iran’s refining capacity
- Securing gasoline imports from friendly allies
- Reducing the use of gasoline
- Development of the public transport system

A special committee set up by the government came up with a four-point program which includes:

- Conversion of most existing cars to run on natural gas within five years at a rate of 1.2 million annually. This will begin with conversion of 600,000 public and governmental cars to NGV.
- Phase out of very old cars (approximately 1.2 million) by 2010.
- As of June 2007, most of the newly manufactured cars will have to be able to run on natural gas.
- Within five years most of Iran’s 10,000 refueling stations will be retrofitted to serve natural gas.

The Iranian government provides incentives to CNG car buyers and has meanwhile decreased the gasoline subsidies. Iran is the Middle East's leading car manufacturer. In 2005 Iranian automakers produced nearly one million vehicles including 884,000 passenger cars and 104,000 heavy vehicles, altogether worth $11.6 billion. The Iranian government aims to have most of Iran’s cars running on natural gas by 2015.

The restrictions began at midnight local time on Wednesday 27 June (2030 GMT Tuesday) and were set to continue for four months. The rationing system, allowed private drivers 100 liters (26 gallons) of fuel per month at the subsidized price. Taxis got 800 liters (211 gallons) a month. Anything more than that was bought at a higher price. The fuel rationing triggered widespread discontent in Iran, but if it succeeds in reducing the amount of imported gasoline, it could help insulate the country from international pressure related to its nuclear program.

Based on the rationing plan, each private car received 120 liters per month at about 10 cents per liter. The price for non-rationed gasoline in November 2008 was almost 40 cents.

== Prices in neighboring countries ==
In mid-November 2008, the prices for gasoline in the neighboring Afghanistan, Armenia, Azerbaijan, Pakistan, Turkey and the UAE were 105, 108, 74, 84, 187 and 45 cents per liter. Whereas, in Iran motorists are allowed 100 liters (26.4 US gallons) of gasoline each month at the subsidized price of about 10 cents per liter (37.9 cents per US gallons) and an unlimited amount at 40 cents per liter ($1.52 per US gallons). This means that the Iranian government is giving subsidy to the Turkish government or the governments of Iraq, Afghanistan, Pakistan and the Arab countries of the south.

On the opposite side, Norway, despite being an oil-rich country, has the most expensive gasoline prices in the world.

== Fuel smuggling ==
According to Iranian counter-smuggling authorities, 17 percent of daily fuel production equivalent to some 40 million liters (10.6 million US gallons) were being smuggled out of the country every day in 2009. This is while most of the smuggling concerns gasoline and diesel fuel, whereas Iran imports both of these to the tune of 30 million liters (7.9 million US gallons) every day. Smugglers are using "lakes of fuel", underground pipelines to neighboring countries and oil tankers on the Shatt al-Arab waterway. Facilities such as the Martyr Rajai Port Complex in Hormuzgan province are reportedly used by the IRGC to export state subsidized gasoline outside the country. Fuel smuggling has increased by 232 percent compared to last year's figures. Iran says its naval security forces have confiscated ten oil tankers smuggling 4,600 tons of Iranian fuel out of the Persian Gulf in 2008. As of 2012, smuggling to Pakistan and Afghanistan continues unabated because of price differential with these countries and because of the steep devaluation of the Iranian rial.

=== Economic damage ===
Iranian taxpayers incur a loss of $3.3 billion annually because of fuel smuggling (& not including other smuggled oil derivatives), equivalent to the "development budget" of Iran.

According to National Police Chief Esmaeil Ahmadi-Moqaddam, before the implementation of the subsidy reform plan, 20 million liters of fuel were trafficked out of the country. Twenty million liters of fuel is still trafficked out of Iran every year despite initial increased domestic fuel prices caused by the Iranian targeted subsidy plan. Over the past three years (2010–13), 8-10 million liters of gasoline has been produced per day by the domestic petrochemical units. Iran decided inexplicably to abandon the Iranian subsidy reform plan after 2014, this in contravention of the goal to stop fuel smuggling with neighboring countries because of the very large price differentials therein.

== Immediate reactions to gas rationing plan ==
Some lawmakers were urgently drafting a bill to stop rationing. Private cars will get 100 litres of gasoline a month but less if they also burn compressed natural gas, state TV said. Drivers have complained that the amount is too little. All gasoline is already sold using electronic "smart" cards, but some drivers have not received them. Officials say the cards will reduce the possibility of a black market in fuel.

Iranians were given only two hours' notice of the move that limits private drivers to 100 litres of fuel a month. There is anger that the government did not give people more notice. At least 12 petrol stations have been torched in the Iranian capital, Tehran. "Guns, fireworks, tanks, [President] Ahmadinejad should be killed," chanted angry youths, throwing stones at police.

== Long term reactions to gas rationing plan ==
As of mid-2008, the Gas Rationing Plan was regarded as a total failure, due to the reasons below:

- Investment of millions of dollars in infrastructure.
- Infrastructure that is unsecured, open to theft, and slow, creating bottlenecks at petrol stations.
- Creation of a black market for petrol, to bypass limitations on purchasable liters.
- Increase in price of petrol.
- Not reducing traffic due to lack of public transport.
- Cause of general inflation due to cost of living.

Oil Minister said the gasoline rationing scheme has helped the country curb consumption by up to 20 million liters a day or $4 billion (2008). Consumption rates approach 22.5 million gallons (85.2 million liters) per day without the restrictions.

Critics acknowledge that rationing did bring consumption down by around 16 million liter a day. Then again, extra quotas for various government organizations, individuals with special needs and some businesses, as well as a 100-liter bonus for ’summer holidays’ allocated by the government reversed the initial fall in consumption. According to Iran-Daily:

Consumers under 45 different categories are now receiving additional gasoline rations. In the early stages of the plan, traffic was reduced, gasoline consumption went down, there was less pollution and people were adapting to the change in fuel consumption patterns. However with the announcement of extra quotas, the initial achievements were destroyed.

In June 2009, Oil Ministry announced that Iran has so far saved $8.5 billion through the nationwide fuel rations program. Regarding the fuel rationing program, if the plan had not been executed, Iran would have had to import 33 million liters of gasoline per day in 2007-8 and 44 million liters in 2008-9. With the implementation of the plan these figures reduced to 18.9 million liters and 21.6 million liters per day, respectively.

== End of the gas rationing plan ==
By July 2010, Iran had managed to save 11 billion dollars since the rationing began which has spared the need for excessive imports of the commodity. In June 2010, it was announced that after the implementation of the new subsidy reform plan, gasoline will be sold on "free market price". The start of the gasoline subsidy cuts will coincide with the beginning of the second half of the Iranian year on September 23, 2010. At that time, the 2007 Gas rationing plan will come to an end (the quota system will remain in place while gasoline prices will be increased).

== See also ==
- Economy of Iran
- Gasoline and diesel usage and pricing
- 2007 Iranian petrol rationing riots
- Iran Sanctions Enhancement Act of 2007
- Iran Refined Petroleum Sanctions Act of 2009
