= Comprehensive Iran Sanctions, Accountability, and Divestment Act of 2010 =

Act of the United States Congress

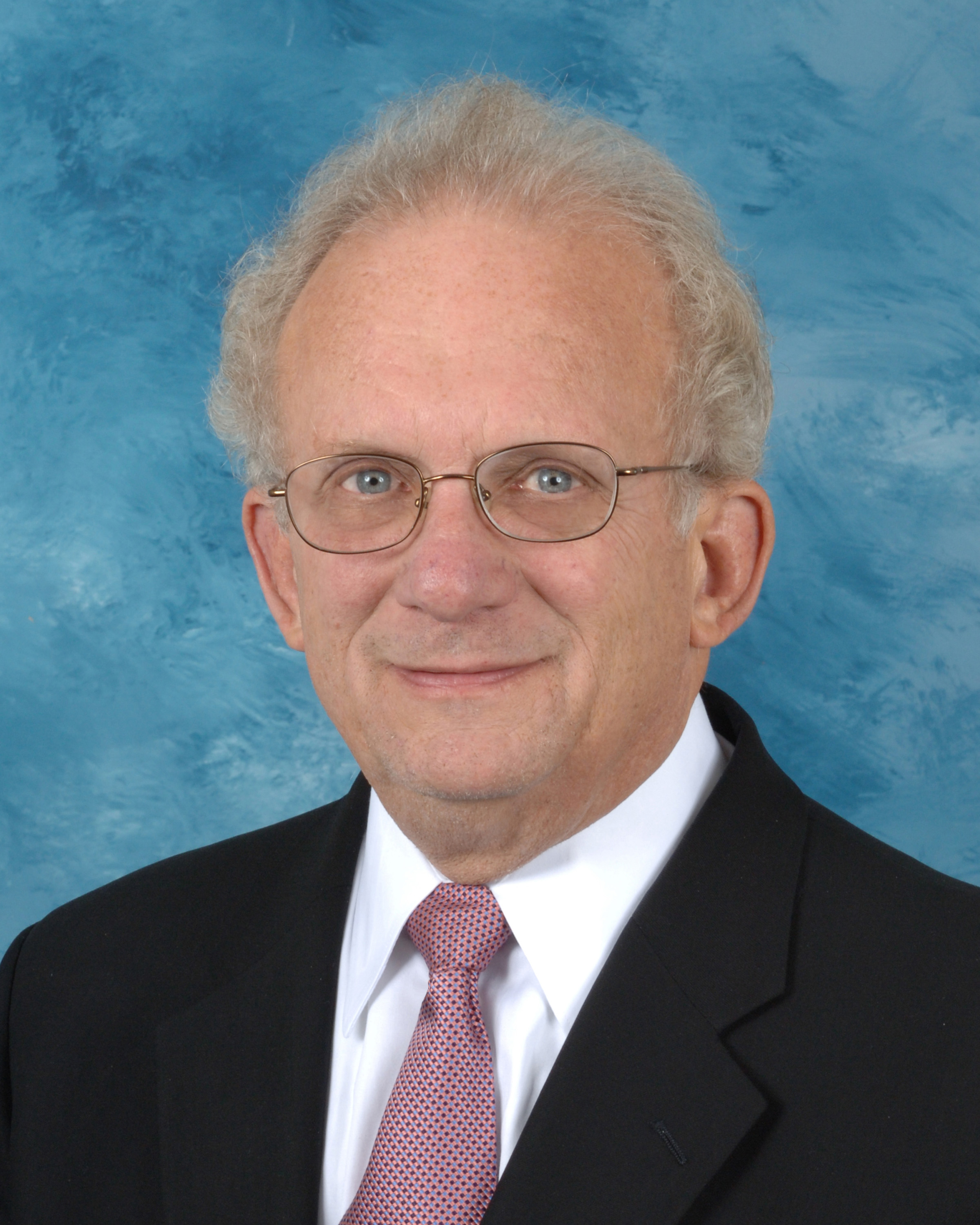
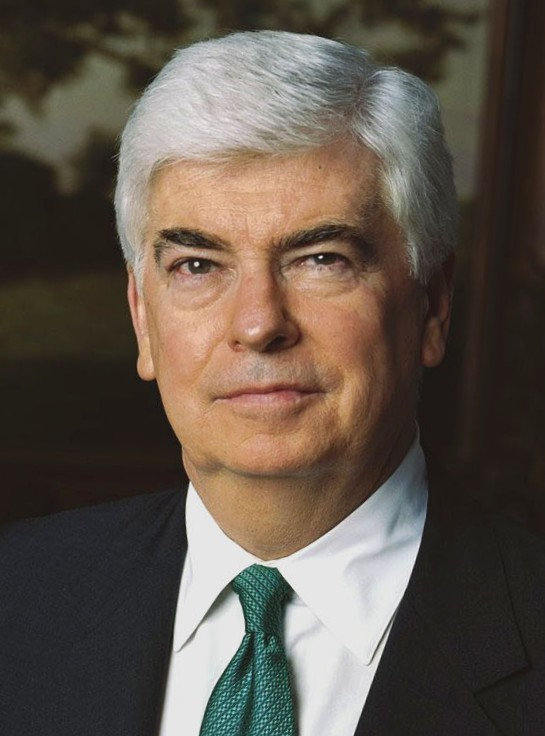
Sponsors: Rep. Howard Berman (H.R. 2194) (left) and Senator Chris Dodd (S. 2799) (right). Senator Evan Bayh sponsored the related (S. 908).

The Comprehensive Iran Sanctions, Accountability, and Divestment Act of 2010 (Pub. L. 111–195 (text) (PDF), 124 Stat. 1312, enacted July 1, 2010; CISADA) is a law passed by the U.S. Congress that applies further sanctions on the government of Iran.

CISADA extended U.S. economic sanctions placed on Iran under the Iran Sanctions Act of 1996 and punishes companies and individuals who aid Iran's petroleum sector. This increased pressure is part of the larger campaign over the Iranian nuclear program, and aims to target Iranian dependence on imports for its gasoline needs. The act was passed by the House (408–8) and Senate (99–0) on June 24, 2010 and signed into law by President Obama on July 1, 2010.

== Background ==
While Iran is the fourth largest oil exporter in the world and second in OPEC, it currently does not have the capacity to refine enough oil to meet its own demand, and thus imports a reported 40% of its gasoline and another 11% of its diesel fuel. According to an American Israel Public Affairs Committee brief from May 2009, nearly 80% of Iranian gasoline imports come from Vitol and Trafigura, while other companies that sell or have recently sold gasoline to Iran include Reliance Industries, Glencore, Total, BP, Shell, Petronas, CNPC, Zhenhua, and Litasco. Besides those companies selling gasoline directly to Iran, IRPSA would target a number of other companies involved in the sector, including those aiding the Iranian refining industry, insurers, and shipping companies.

Despite the reliance on foreign suppliers, the 2007 Gas Rationing Plan did lead to a decline in imports. The nine existing refineries are managed by the National Iranian Oil Refining and Distribution Company and reportedly had a refining capacity of 1,451,000 bbl/d (230,700 m^{3}/d) as of 2008. Iran is working towards doubling this capacity to 3,000,000 bbl/d (480,000 m^{3}/d) by the year 2012, at which point it may become a net exporter of gasoline. In mid-November 2009, Iranian Oil Minister Masoud Mir-Kazemi said that Iran was preparing, if necessary, to produce an extra 14 million liters of gasoline per day to counter possible sanctions, matched with a 70-day domestic stockpile of gasoline and a future reduction in gasoline subsidies. In September 2010, Iran said it had coped by converting at least two petrochemical plants to gasoline production, though it used a generally inferior process that initially produces benzene.

The idea of reducing Iranian gasoline imports as a means of pressuring Iran was examined during the administration of President George W. Bush but ultimately not taken up. During the 2008 presidential campaign, Barack Obama brought up the idea in a presidential debate.

== Legislative history ==
A previous iteration of the bill, the Iran Refined Petroleum Sanctions Act of 2009 (IRPSA) was introduced in the United States Senate on April 28, 2009, as S. 908 by Senator Evan Bayh and has since garnered 77 cosponsors. It was then introduced as H.R. 2194 in the United States House of Representatives on April 30 by Representative Howard L. Berman and attracted 343 cosponsors. The move elicited responses from Iran, with a spokesman for the Foreign Ministry also said that "Sanctions and threats will not intimidate us and especially not affect our national will in following our rights".

An August 2009 report in The New York Times stated that the proposal to target Iranian gasoline via companies involved had been discussed between Israeli officials and National Security Advisor James L. Jones as well as with allies in Europe.

According to Rep. Berman, he will move the bill forward in October 2009 barring "some compelling evidence" not to do so; House Majority Leader Steny Hoyer has stated that he would then bring it to the House floor.

In the aftermath of the September 25, 2009 revelation that Iran had built a secret uranium enrichment facility near Qom, Berman reiterated his commitment to push IRPSA forward in October and wrote an editorial in The Washington Post describing the sanctions and their purpose.

On October 28, the bill was marked up in the House Foreign Affairs Committee under chairman Howard Berman and then passed by a voice vote. The following day the Senate Banking Committee under chairman Christopher Dodd unanimously approved the Senate version of the bill; in fact, the Senate bill passed was entitled the Comprehensive Iran Sanctions, Accountability, and Divestment Act of 2009 (S. 2799), which incorporated IRPSA provisions.

In late November the Obama administration was reported to be preparing new sanctions against Iran, though one official who discussed IRPSA said that "'The problem with congressional measures is you can't turn them on and off as you like. ... We've been having ongoing discussions with the Hill,' to tailor the bills and slow them up." Democratic comments on December 3 indicated that they would bring IRPSA to the floor of the House of Representatives in two weeks time and a push would be made to pass it before Congress leaves at the end of the month for a holiday recess. The bill was finally brought to the House floor on December 15 and was passed with 412 votes in favor, 12 against, and 4 present. At the time the Senate's bill was held up in part because of a letter sent by Deputy Secretary of State James Steinberg to Senator John Kerry, chairman of the Senate Foreign Relations Committee, asking him to temporarily delay the bill and outlining several concerns "including the lack of flexibility, inefficient monetary thresholds and penalty levels, and blacklisting that could cause unintended foreign policy consequences".

On January 26, the AFP quoted Senate majority leader Harry Reid as saying that the Senate may find time to take up its version of IRPSA in the coming weeks. Just two days later, Reid brought S. 2799 to the floor for a voice vote, and it was passed. Right before passage Senator John McCain wished to add an amendment to target Iranians accused of human rights abuses, but Reid wanted to avoid a situation where other senators began introducing their own additional amendments. After the intervention of Senator Joe Lieberman, McCain relented with the assurance that his amendment would be included in the conference report.

Letters signed by majorities in both Houses of Congress were to be sent to President Obama on April 19 urging him to quickly implement Congressional sanctions against Iran; the Senate–House conference for IRPSA was scheduled for that week. On April 28 the first conference meeting took place. Due to reported progress on the UN Security Council sanctions track and expectations that the EU would make further decisions on Iran in mid-June, conference co-chairs Berman and Dodd announced on May 25 that they did not intend to pass IRPSA until the second half of June. After a new round of UN sanctions was approved on June 9, Berman reaffirmed his intention to bring IRPSA to a vote before the July 4 recess but after an EU meeting on June 16 and 17.

== Supporters and opponents ==
On September 10 the Anti-Defamation League and other Jewish organizations participating in the National Jewish Leadership Advocacy Day on Iran urged the adoption of IRPSA and similar bills. The bill is also supported by United Against Nuclear Iran, the American Israel Public Affairs Committee, the American Jewish Committee, the Conference of Presidents of Major American Jewish Organizations, and J Street. Israeli Ambassador Michael Oren released a general statement of support after the passage of H.R. 2194. The Washington Post wrote in an editorial on February 13, 2010, that President Obama should sign IRPSA, stating that although "secondary sanctions are a blunt instrument... the threat of them might be needed to prod the Security Council or an ad-hoc Western alliance into taking steps that will break the Iranian regime's dangerous gathering of momentum."

A report by The Weekly Standard said that several provisions in the Senate bill had received opposition from the Export-Import Bank of the United States, which has made loan guarantees to some foreign companies that conduct business with Iran. Nine business groups (Business Roundtable, Coalition for Employment through Exports, Emergency Committee for American Trade, National Association of Manufacturers, National Foreign Trade Council, Organization for International Investment, USA*Engage, U.S. Chamber of Commerce, and U.S. Council for International Business) have come out against the bill in a joint letter to National Security Advisor James L. Jones and National Economic Council Chairman Larry Summers, in which they stated that such "unilateral, extraterritorial, and overly broad" sanctions would be counterproductive in the mission to stop Iran from achieving nuclear weapons.

== Provisions ==
Major provisions of H.R. 2194 as summarized by the Congressional Research Service:

- Amends the Iran Sanctions Act of 1996 to direct the President to impose two or more current sanctions under such Act if a person has, with actual knowledge, made an investment of $20 million or more (or any combination of investments of at least $5 million which in the aggregate equals or exceeds $20 million in any 12-month period) that directly and significantly contributed to Iran's ability to develop its petroleum resources.
- Directs the President to impose: (1) sanctions established under this Act (in addition to any current sanctions imposed under the Iran Sanctions Act of 1996) if a person has, with actual knowledge, sold, leased, or provided to Iran any goods, services, technology, information, or support that would allow Iran to maintain or expand its domestic production of refined petroleum resources, including any assistance in refinery construction, modernization, or repair; and (2) sanctions established under this Act if a person has, with actual knowledge, provided Iran with refined petroleum resources or engaged in any activity that could contribute to Iran's ability to import refined petroleum resources, including providing shipping, insurance, or financing services for such activity.
- Establishes additional sanctions prohibiting specified foreign exchange, banking, and property transactions.

== See also ==
- Sanctions against Iran
- Iran and Libya Sanctions Act of 1996
- Iran Freedom and Support Act
- Iran Sanctions Enhancement Act of 2007
- 2007 Gas Rationing Plan in Iran
- United States embargoes
