= 2007 Iranian petrol rationing riots =

Iranian petrol rationing riots started on 27 June 2007 when the Iranian government introduced petrol rationing. Iranians set fire to at least 12 petrol stations in Tehran, chanting that President Mahmoud Ahmadinejad must be killed.

Private motorists were rationed to 100 litres of petrol a month. Petrol currently sells at the heavily subsidised price of 1,000 rials a litre (approx. €0.08 or US$0.11).

The Iranian government's justification for the rationing was to reduce Iran's vulnerability to potential sanctions by the United Nations Security Council which would be in response to Iran's nuclear programme. Iran had been planning to ration petrol for a year prior, but had postponed the policy out of fear of unrest. The Iranian Parliament voted on May 7 to increase the price of petrol to $0.64, but Ahmadinejad decided to ration it instead. Iranian newspapers have been criticizing the decision, despite a warning prior to the start of the rationing to not report the riots. Iranian newspaper Etemad Melli criticized the decision, saying that it had overwhelmed public transportation, stranding people on the streets, and wondered if the Iranian government enjoys or benefits from causing such difficulties.

Another Iranian newspaper, Seday-e-Edelat, reported that five gallons of petrol sold for US$15 in the southeast regions on Iran on the black market.

== See also ==
- 2007 Gasoline Rationing Plan in Iran

== Sources ==
- Angry protests flare in Iran over petrol rationing (turkishpress.com)
