= Gasoline and diesel usage and pricing =

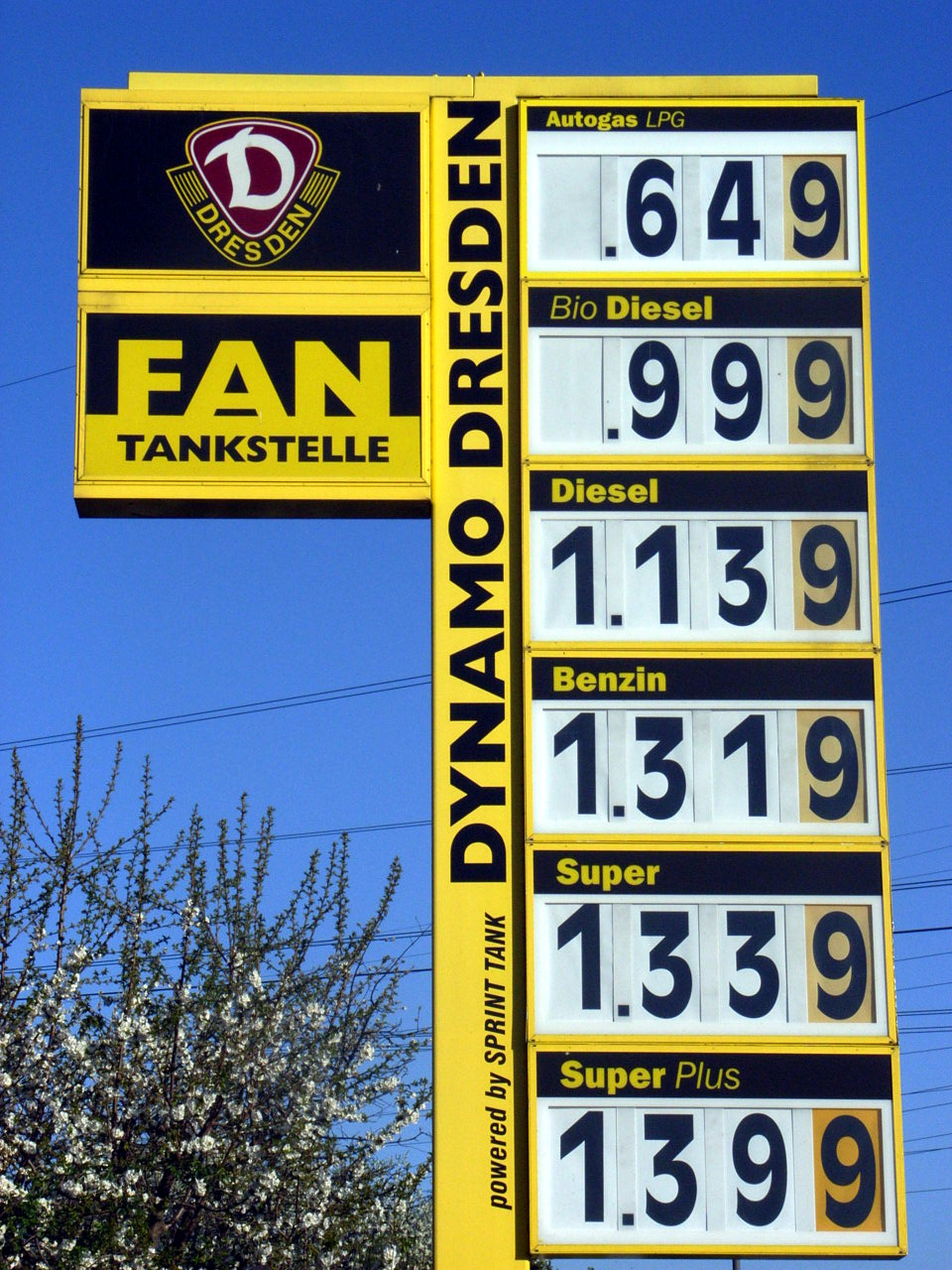
Example from Germany 2007, €1.319/l

The usage and pricing of gasoline (or petrol) results from factors such as crude oil prices, processing and distribution costs, local demand, the strength of local currencies, local taxation or subsidy, and the availability of local sources of gasoline (supply). Since fuels are traded worldwide, the trade prices are similar. The price paid by consumers largely reflects national pricing policy. Most countries impose taxes on gasoline (petrol), whereas a few, such as Venezuela, subsidize the cost. No country's taxes cover all the negative externalities (air pollution and CO2 emissions) associated with usage, that is they do not make the polluter pay the full cost. Western countries have among the highest usage rates per person. The largest consumer is the United States.

== Fuel prices in the United States ==
The retail price of gasoline in the US increased at the outbreak of war in Ukraine and Iran.

The retail price of diesel fuel in the US increased at the outbreak of war in Ukraine and Iran.

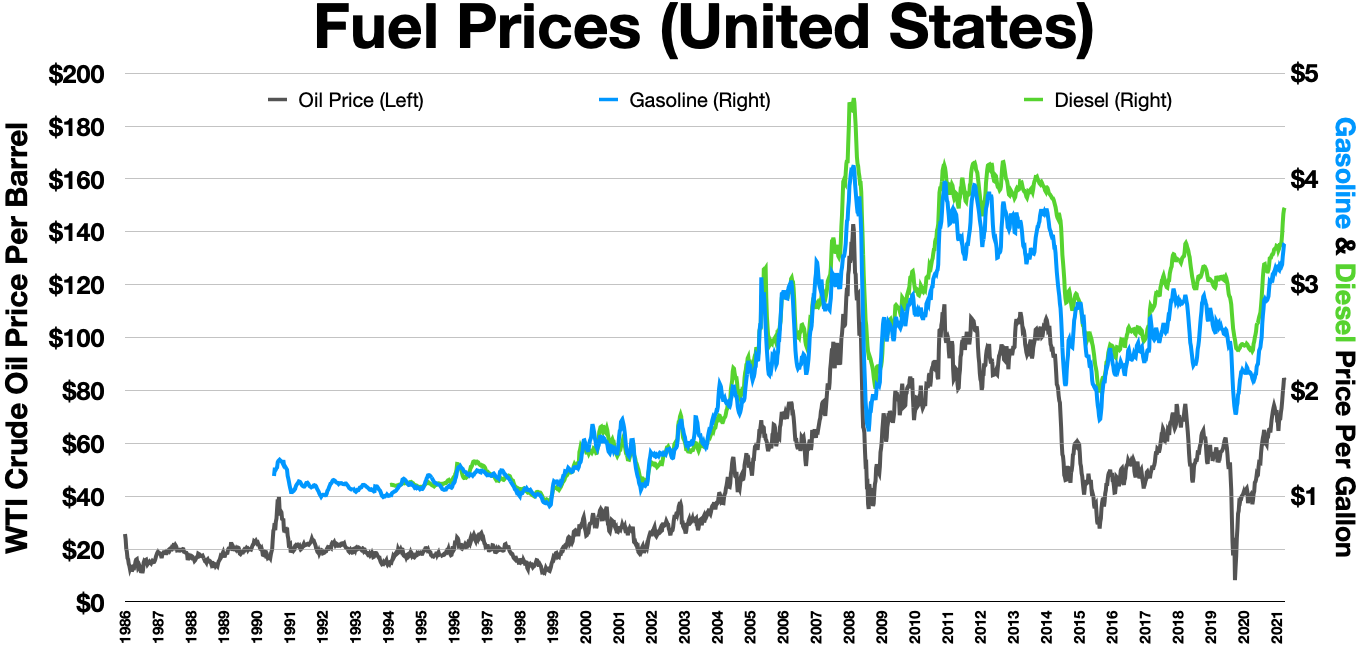
Oil, gas, and diesel prices

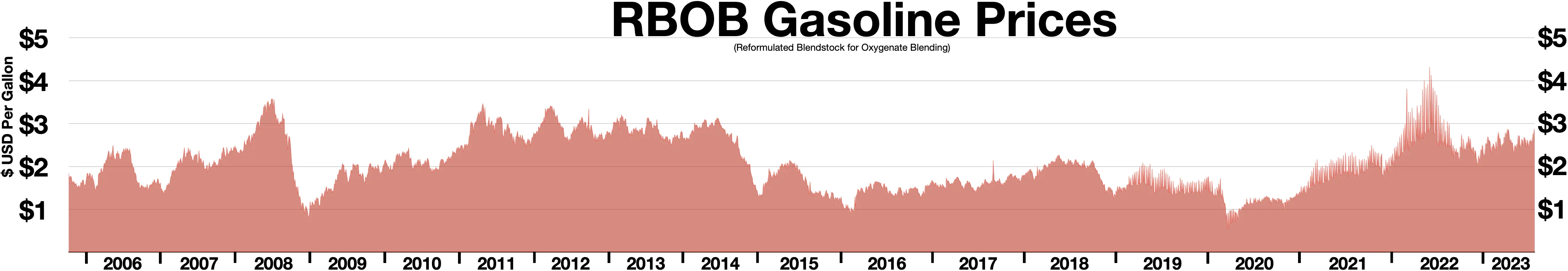
RBOB Gasoline Prices

In 2008, a report by Cambridge Energy Research Associates stated that 2007 had been the year of peak gasoline usage in the United States, and that record energy prices would cause an "enduring shift" in energy consumption practices. According to the report, in April fuel consumption had been lower than a year before for the sixth straight month, suggesting 2008 would be the first year US usage declined in 17 years. The total annual distance driven in the US began declining in 2006.

After Hurricane Katrina and Hurricane Rita, gas prices started rising to record levels. Increases in crude oil prices significantly predict the growth of real gross domestic product (GDP), but increases in natural gas prices do not. In August 2005, after Hurricane Katrina, spot market gas prices surged past $11 per gigajoule ($12 per million British thermal units), and by 22 September 2005, before Hurricane Rita's landfall, had risen to $14 per gigajoule ($15 per million British thermal units).

In the fifteen years prior to the 1973 oil crisis, gasoline prices in the U.S. had lagged behind inflation.

A May 2004 report by the Government Accountability Office (GAO) on petroleum industry mergers from the 1990s to 2004 found that the mergers increased companies' ability to influence prices.

In early 2020, the national average gas price dropped to $1.73 per gallon. In 2021, it rose to $3.01/gallon, and by June 2022 reached over $5/gallon, with some areas reporting $6/gallon. Prices later declined but fluctuated through late 2022.

In March 2026, average gasoline prices in the United States rose above $4 per gallon for the first time since 2022, driven largely by disruptions to global oil supply.

=== Factors affecting gasoline prices ===
According to the Energy Information Administration (EIA), as of March 2022, factors affecting the price of gasoline in the United States include the price of crude oil, costs and profits related to refining, distribution, marketing, and taxes. Higher octane levels cost more, with premium grade averaging about 68 cents per gallon more than regular grade in 2021. From 2012 through 2021, crude oil represented 54.8% of the average $2.80/gallon price, taxes 17%, distribution and marketing 14.3%, and refining 14%. In 2021, crude oil accounted for 53.6%, taxes 16.4%, distribution and marketing 15.6%, and refining 14.4%.

==== Crude oil ====
Crude oil is the main factor affecting gasoline and diesel prices. Exploration, extraction, and transport costs contribute to pricing. Between 2004 and 2008, global demand increases raised oil prices from $35 to $140 per barrel ($220 to $880/m^{3}), causing a corresponding rise in gas prices. OPEC production decisions and speculation in oil markets also influence gasoline prices.

==== Marketing and distribution ====
Distribution and marketing costs cover transportation of crude oil to refineries and gasoline to retailers, as well as brand marketing expenses.

In the United States, marketing and distribution costs represent a significant component of the retail price of gasoline, typically accounting for 11% to 15% of the total cost per gallon. These expenses encompass the logistics of transporting crude oil to refineries and the subsequent delivery of refined products to retail outlets via pipelines and tanker trucks. According to the Energy Information Administration (EIA), this share stood at 15.6% in 2021, though it can fluctuate relative to the price of crude oil; during the global supply disruptions of 2026, for example, the relative share of distribution costs was estimated at 11% as the cost of raw crude increased.

Retailer profit margins are also included within this category. While gas stations typically average a gross margin of 30 to 35 cents per gallon, these margins are often inversely correlated with crude oil price trends: margins tend to contract when oil prices surge rapidly and expand when prices decline.

==== Taxes ====
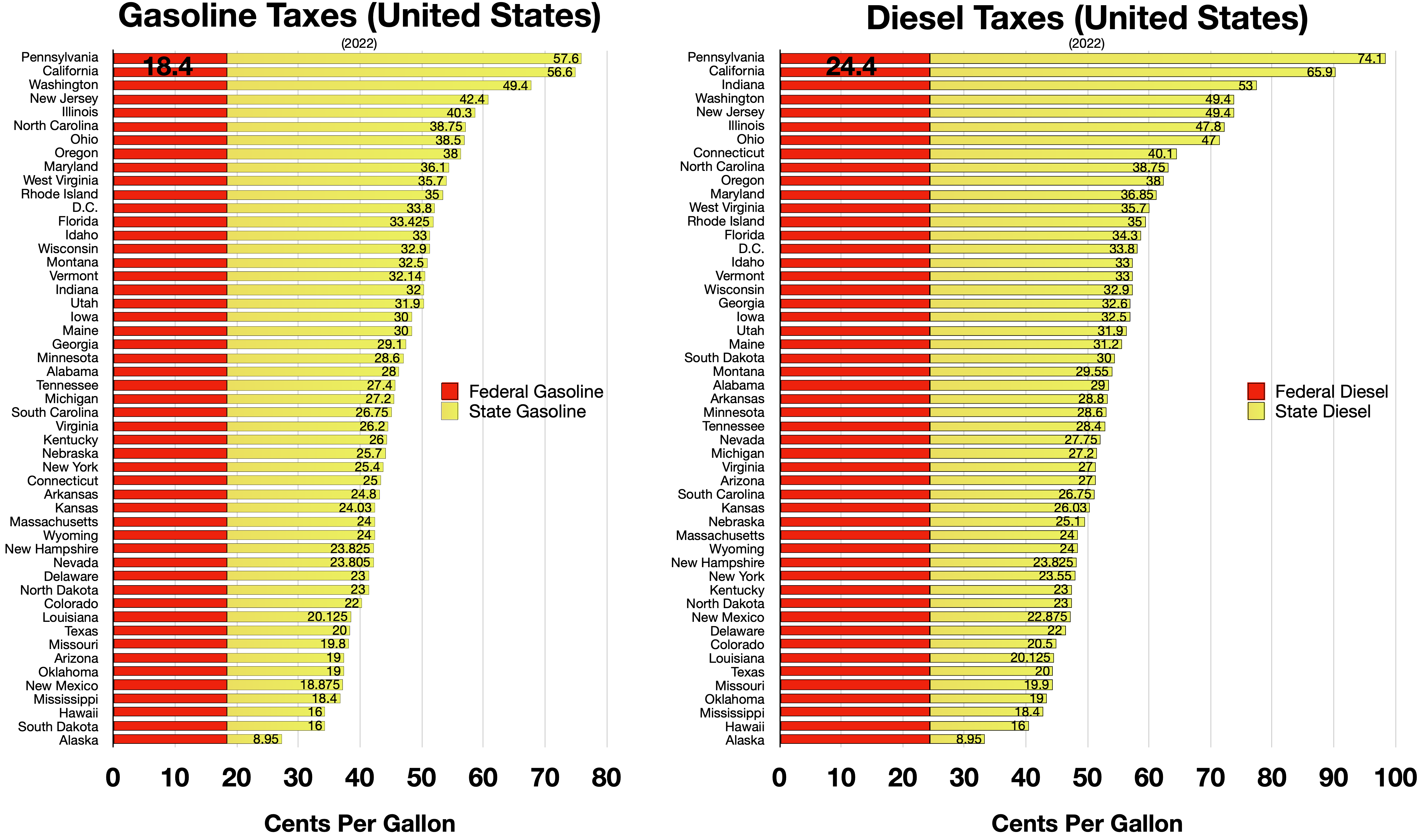
Fuel taxes (2022) Federal taxes State taxes

The United States federal excise tax on gasoline is 18.4 cents per gallon and 24.4 cents per gallon for diesel fuel. Proceeds from the tax partly support the Highway Trust Fund. The federal tax was last raised on October 1, 1993, and is not indexed to inflation, which increased 122% from October 1993 until November 2025. On average, as of April 2019, state and local taxes and fees add 34.24 cents to gasoline and 35.89 cents to diesel, for a total US volume-weighted average fuel tax of 52.64 cents per gallon for gas and 60.29 cents per gallon for diesel.

==== Other factors ====
Weather events, conflicts, and legislation for cleaner-burning fuels can raise prices. Gasoline costs also follow seasonal demand patterns, typically increasing in summer. U.S. consumption has generally risen since 1950, with notable dips during the introduction of corporate average fuel economy standards, the 1979 energy crisis, the early 1990s recession and Gulf War, and the Great Depression.

== Petrol usage and pricing in Europe ==
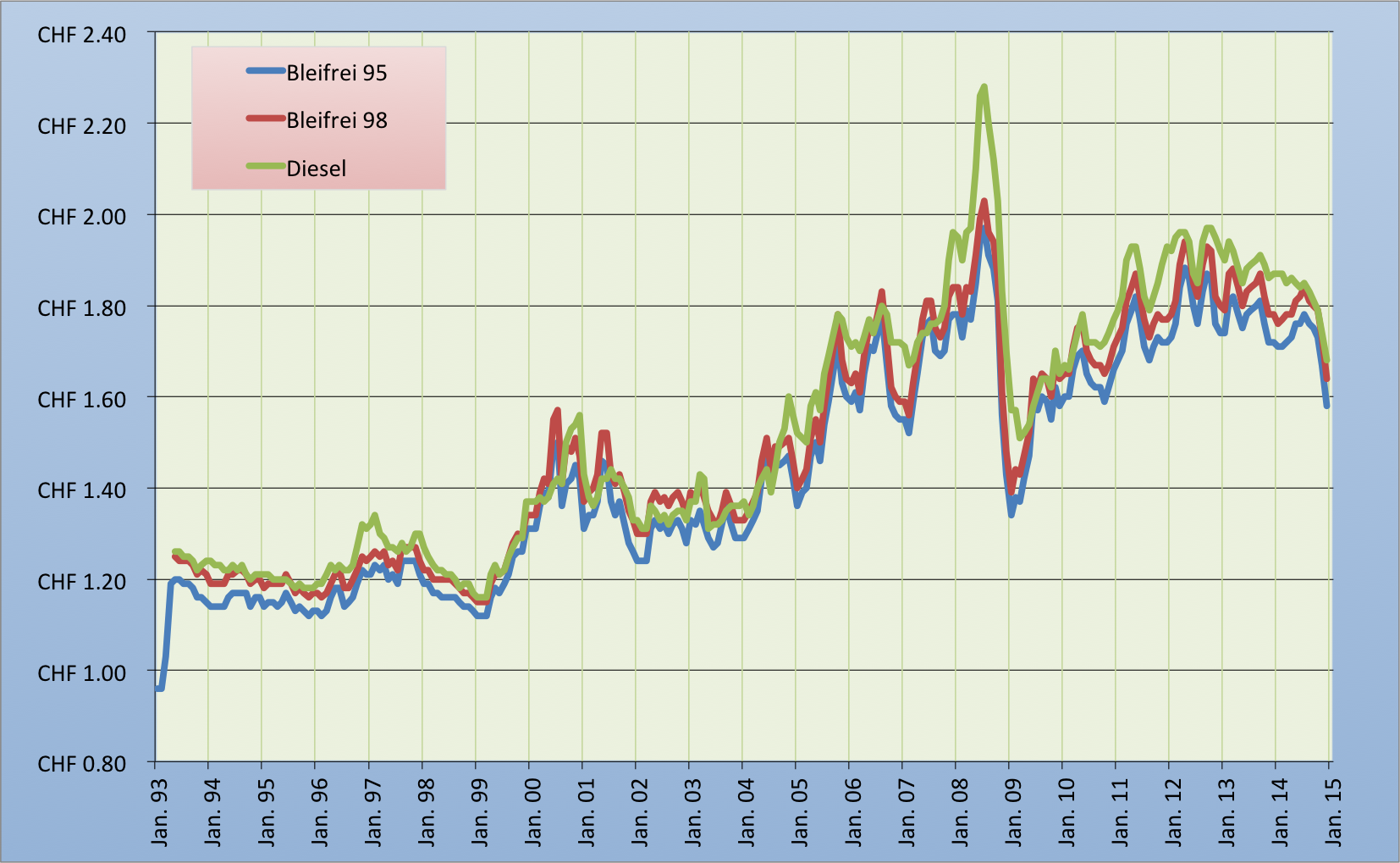
Gasoline and Diesel nominal price development 1993 to 2014 in Switzerland (CHF/L)

Most European countries have higher fuel taxes than the US, but Russia and some neighboring countries have a much smaller tax, with fuel prices similar to the US.

Competitive petrol pricing in the UK is led by supermarkets with their own forecourts. Generally each supermarket tends to match the other's prices; the lead players being Asda, Tesco, Sainsbury's and Morrisons.

== Countries that have or had subsidised gasoline ==
A number of countries subsidize fossil fuels such as petrol/gasoline and other petroleum products. Subsidies make transport of people and goods cheaper, but discourage fuel efficiency. In some countries, the soaring cost of crude oil since 2003 has led to these subsidies being cut, moving inflation from the government debt to the general populace, sometimes resulting in political unrest.

Fuel subsidies are common in oil-rich nations. Countries with subsidized fuel include Saudi Arabia, Iran, Egypt, Burma, Kuwait, Bahrain, Trinidad and Tobago, Brunei, Venezuela, Ecuador and Bolivia.

In February 2010, the Iranian government implemented an energy price reform by which the energy subsidies were to be removed in five years; the most important price hike was in gasoline, as the price went up from 1000 rials ($0.10 US) to 4000 rials ($0.40 US) per litre, with a ration of 100 litres per month for private passenger cars (later reduced to 60 litres per month).

On 26 December 2010, the Bolivian government issued a decree removing subsidies which had fixed petrol/gasoline and diesel prices for the past seven years. Arguing that illegal exports (contraband) of gasoline and diesel fuel to neighboring countries by individuals for personal profit was harming the economy, Bolivia eliminated the subsidies and raised gasoline prices as much as 83%. After widespread labor strikes, the Bolivian government canceled all future planned price hikes.

Venezuela used to have the cheapest gasoline in the world for decades, however on 19 February 2016 president Nicolás Maduro used decree powers to raise fuel prices by 6000%. This was the first rise in petrol prices in 20 years and he also set in place a sharp devaluation of the currency which he said aimed to shore up the country's failing economy, hard hit by falling oil prices which make up 95% of foreign income. Prices at the pump in Venezuela jumped as much as 6,086% for 95 octane gasoline, from 0.097 bolivars to 6 bolivars. May 20, 2020 government increased the price to US$0.5 a litre.

=== Iran ===
The Iranian government introduced an energy price reform in February 2010. The reform was brought forward by the government and approved with some changes by the parliament. The major aim of the policy was to slow down the increasing trend of energy consumption in Iran by removing the energy subsidies. The plan included electricity, natural gas, gasoline, and diesel subsidies. According to the plan, all energy prices were to increase by 20 percent annually. The price reform was particularly important in gasoline, as consumption had been increasing dramatically creating a huge burden on government budget. Furthermore, to meet demand, Iran had to import gasoline from other countries, which made the country vulnerable to possible sanctions by the US and European countries. The gas price prior to reform was $0.10 US per liter with the quota of 100 liters per month per passenger car. The reform raised the price to $0.40 US per liter and later reduced the ration to 60 liters per month. The price for over-quota consumption and the imported cars were $0.70 US per liter. The energy price reform included a cash-rebate program through which each person received 455,000 rials ($15 US) per month from the government. The overall consumption of gasoline after the reform decreased from about 65 million liters per day to about 54 million liters per day.

The price of gasoline based on the official USD to IRR rate is US$0.29/Litre in 2018 which is the second cheapest price in the world after Venezuela.

=== Indonesia ===
With oil reaching over US$145 a barrel, Indonesia further increased prices in May 2008 to Rp 6,000 (approx. US$0.65) per litre, and diesel to Rp 5,500 (approx. US$0.60) per litre, while kerosene was raised to Rp 2,500 (approx. US$0.28), moves which caused widespread protests.

Furthermore, in November 2014, the new government led by President Joko Widodo reallocated the government subsidy for gasoline and diesel into nation's infrastructure, education and health budget, hence raised the price of subsidized gasoline and diesel by Rp 2,000 each, so the price of gasoline and diesel became Rp 8,500 and Rp 7,500 respectively. This decision created inflation and protest throughout the archipelago.

=== Malaysia ===
Malaysia had been subsidising gasoline since 1983. In 2014, Malaysia abolished fuel subsidies and began using a managed float system, in order to control the country's large current account deficit. On 12 February, 2021, The diesel price rises from RM2.11 to RM2.15 for entire country and has being the same until 10 June 2024, where Prime Minister, Anwar Ibrahim decided to use a managed float system with diesel price in West Malaysia. With a plan to do the same with Sarawak and Sabah in future. In September 2025, Anwar Ibrahim, the Prime Minister of Malaysia decided to revive the fuel subsidy program through BUDI MADANI RON95 or abbreviated BUDI95. The program started with the police and the military on 27 September and people who received the Sumbangan Tunai Rahmah (STR) or the "Rahmah Cash Contribution" on 28 September. The BUDI95 program was made available to the general public on 30 September. During the 2026 Strait of Hormuz crisis, the cost for the government to maintain these subsidies reached RM3.2 billion a month.

=== Nigeria ===
Petrol subsidies mainly benefit rich people. On 1 January 2012, the Nigerian government headed by president Goodluck Ebele Jonathan, tried to cease the subsidy on petrol and deregulate the oil prices by announcing the new price for petrol as US$0.88/litre from the old subsidised price of US$0.406/litre (LAGOS), which in areas distant from Lagos petrol was priced at US$1.25/litre. This led to the longest general strike (eight days), riots, Arab spring like protests and on 16 January 2012 the government capitulated by announcing a new price of US$0.60/litre with an envisaged price of US$2.0/litre in distant areas. In May 2016 the Buhari administration increased fuel prices again to NGN 145 per litre ($0.43 at black market rates for the currency). In September 2020, the government had announced an increase in the pump price of petrol to NGN 151.56 per litre from NGN 148.

More recently, following the election of President Bola Tinubu in 2023, the Nigerian government significantly reduced the petrol price subsidy, and a year later, it finally eliminated the subsidy altogether. In November 2024, Tinubu said that the removal of the subsidy is saving Nigeria US$7.5 billion per year.

=== Mexico ===
PEMEX, a government company in charge of selling oil in Mexico is subsidized by the Mexican government. This serves to quell inflationary pressures in Mexico. Mexico buys much of its gasoline and diesel from the United States and resells it at US$98 per barrel. Many residents of US border communities cross the border to buy fuel in Mexico, thereby enjoying a cheaper fuel subsidy at the expense of Mexican taxpayers. This has caused frequent supply shortages at a number of filling stations along the border for Mexican drivers, especially truck and bus drivers who use diesel.

In 2017, Mexico ended its oil industry subsidies, leading to increased prices and widespread protests throughout the country.

=== Trinidad and Tobago ===
Trinidad and Tobago through its national energy agencies Petrotrin and Trinidad and Tobago National Petroleum Marketing Company Limited (NP) offers petroleum fuels at varying subsidized prices to the users within the country. Unleaded Gasoline is offered at two grades - Ron 91 at US$0.43/Litre and Ron 95 at US$0.91/Litre. Diesel is offered at US$0.24/litre, making this fuel some of the cheapest in the world.

There are an estimated 791,086 cars in the country as of February 2015 and they consume 1.2 billion litres of liquid fuel annually. The Government of Trinidad and Tobago spent an estimated US$173.2 million in subsidies for gasoline and diesel in the period spanning October 2014 - March 2015.

=== United States ===
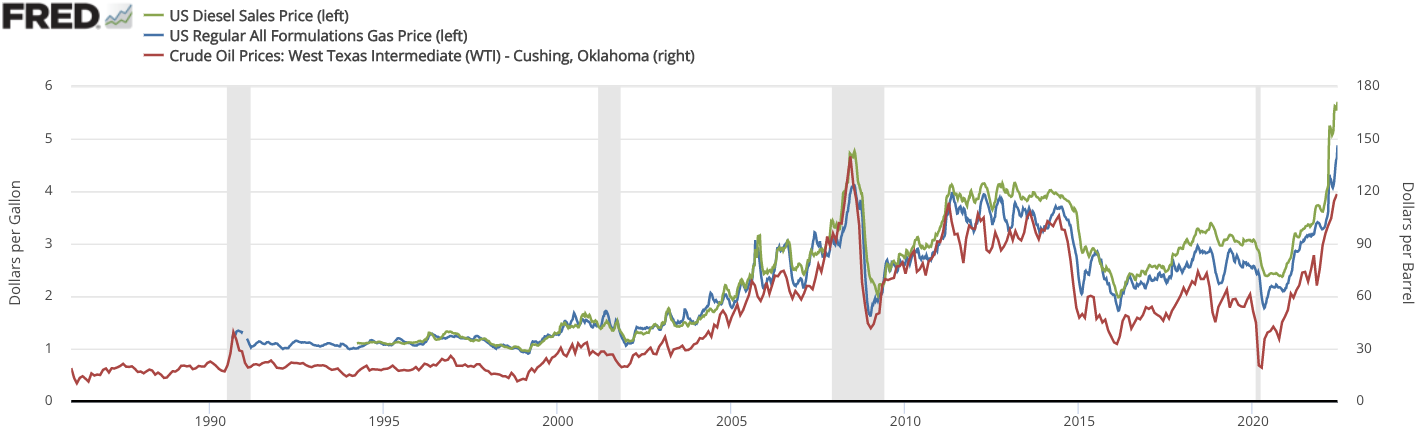
Diesel fuel (left) Gasoline (left) Crude Oil Price (WTI) (right)

The oil industry receives subsidies through the United States tax code, which include Percentage Depletion Allowance, Domestic Manufacturing Tax Deduction, the Foreign Tax Credit and Expensing Intangible Drilling Costs. It is estimated that these tax deductions are worth $4 billion annually and are currently being debated by the government for reform. Although such subsidies exist, the sale of fuel is also taxed at rates that far exceed the sales tax rates for other goods, to help pay for bridge and road repair. It is thus unclear whether the tax impact on fuel is a net subsidy or not. However, fuel taxes can account for less than half of government road and highway spending. The additional spending is clearly a subsidy, since the existence of these roads creates fuel demand. Moreover, since the fuel tax itself is allocated to road repair, and petroleum vehicles are the main users of roads, one cannot claim the existence of such a tax cancels out other subsidies.

In 2021-22, gasoline and diesel prices surged in the United States, reaching record highs, as part of a larger trend of inflation. The average price of regular gasoline rose from $1.773 during the week of April 27, 2020, to $5 as of June 11, 2022, an all-time high. California led the nation in gasoline prices with an average gallon of regular gasoline in the state reaching $6.43 as of June 11, 2022.

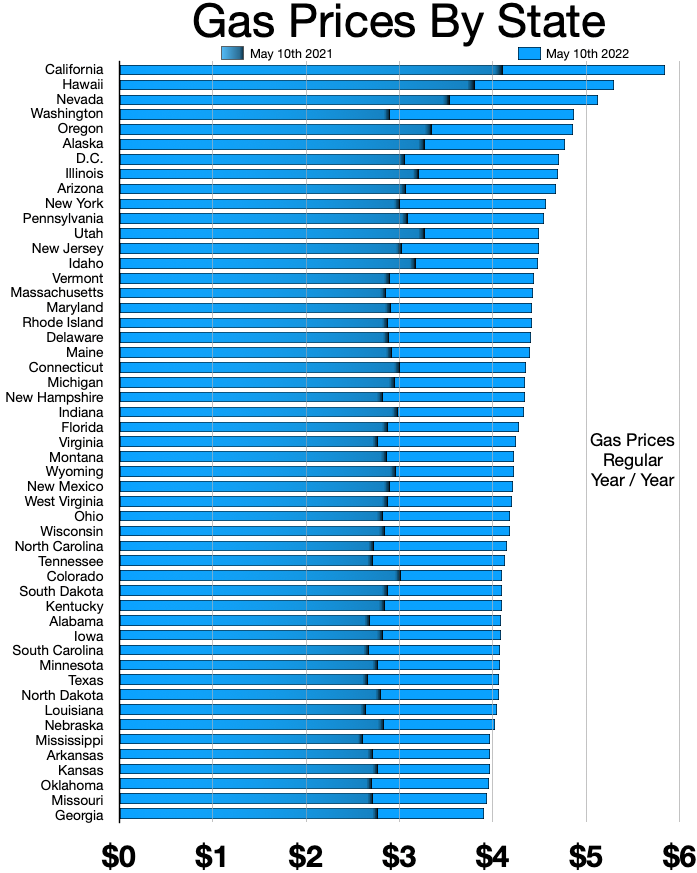
Gasoline prices by state Difference from 1 year prior

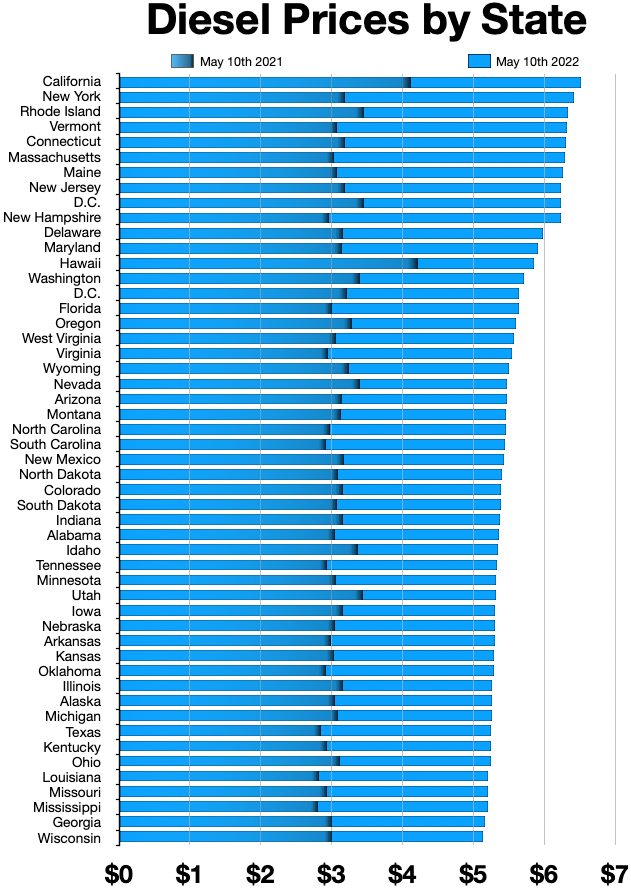
Diesel prices by state Difference from 1 year prior

=== Venezuela ===
Currently, in Venezuela, there are a total of 1,500 gas stations. 500 of these gas stations sell gas for the subsidized price, 500 sell gas at a dollar price, and the rest sell gas interchangeably between both (subsidized & unsubsidized). In 2013, PDVSA, Venezuelan state-owned company, spent US$1.7 billion in direct costs of importation of gasoline, and subsidizing all sales of gasoline in the internal Venezuelan market. The sale price of gasoline was US$0.015 per liter, on a fixed price in the local currency that has been in effect since 1997. Given the low price of gasoline, it is distributed free of charge to gas stations.

On May 30, 2020, government did announce a price increase to US$0.5 per liter which is the price until now Jun 4 2021, but with supply shortages at the service stations.

== Protests ==
=== India ===
Wide protests on petrol price hikes have been frequent in the last decade. On 24 May 2012, the petrol price was hiked by ₹7.50, resulting prices in the range of ₹73–82 ($0.97–1.09) per liter all over the country. Opposition had declared a bandh on 31 May 2012 across the country to protest against the price hike, which evoked mixed response amid incidents of stone pelting, arson and road blockades in some parts of the country.

In May 2026, petrol and diesel prices in Mumbai rose above ₹106 per litre and ₹93 per litre respectively following a nationwide fuel price revision by oil marketing companies amid rising global crude oil prices and geopolitical tensions in the Middle East.

== See also ==
- Car costs
- List of oil refineries
