= Transport in Iran =

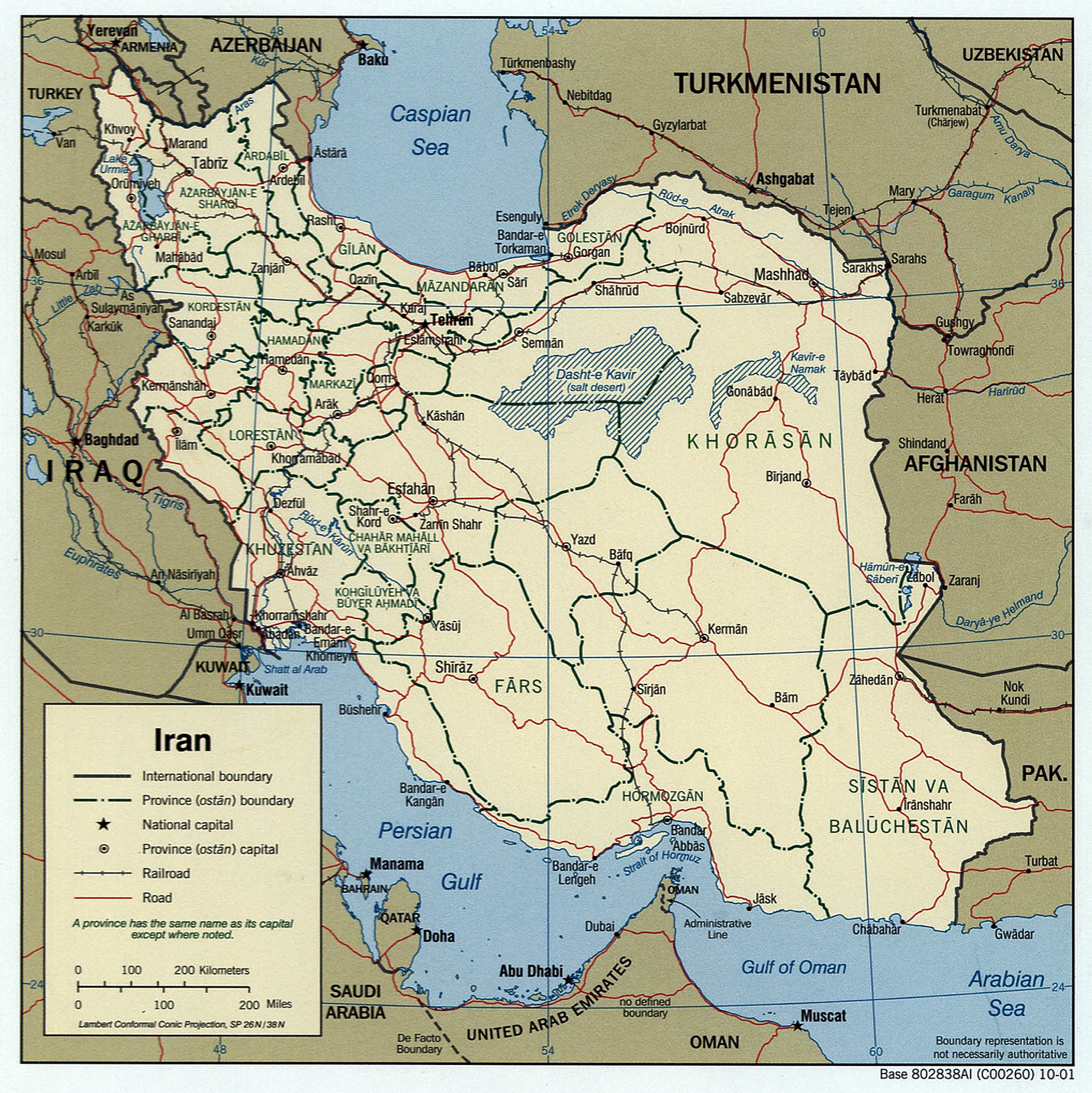
Major routes and railroads of Iran. Tehran is the hub of Iran's transport and communication system.

Transport in Iran is inexpensive because of the government's subsidization of the price of gasoline. The downside is a huge draw on government coffers, economic inefficiency because of highly wasteful consumption patterns, contraband with neighboring countries and air pollution. Iran has a long paved road system linking most of its towns and all of its cities.

Trains operate on 11,106 km (6,942 mi) of railroad track. The country's major port of entry is Bandar-Abbas on the Strait of Hormuz. After arriving in Iran, imported goods are distributed throughout the country by trucks and freight trains. The Tehran–Bandar-Abbas railroad, opened in 1995, connects Bandar-Abbas to the railroad system of Central Asia via Tehran and Mashhad. Other major ports include Bandar e-Anzali and Bandar e-Torkeman on the Caspian Sea and Khorramshahr and Bandar-e Emam Khomeyni on the Persian Gulf.

Dozens of cities have airports that serve passenger and cargo planes. Iran Air, the national airline, was founded in 1962 and operates domestic and international flights.

== Ministry of Road and Transportation ==
The Ministry of Roads and Transportation is in charge of studying and deciding pricing policy of the transportation; as well as issuing licenses for the establishment of transportation firms. In addition, the Ministry is in charge of implementing comprehensive and integrated transportation policies in Iran. As of 2016, plans for foreign direct investment in the transport sector include over 5,600 km of highways, 745 km of freeways, and close to 3,000 km of main roads. These projects and others are worth $25 billion (not including aircraft purchases worth another $50 billion). Iran says it needs more than $40 billion to complete 258 major unfinished transportation projects (2016).

== Railways ==
Railway system map (2020)

- Total: 11,106 km Plan to increase total railways length from 13,500 km in 2016 to 20,000 km by 2025.
  - Standard gauge: 8,273 km of 1,435 mm (4 ft 8 1/2 in) gauge (146 km electrified) (2006)
  - Broad gauge: 94 km of 1,676 mm (5 ft 6 in) gauge (connected to Pakistan Railways)

Electrified railway is 146 km from Tabriz to Jolfa and the tender for electrification of Tehran–Mashhad has been finished according to Railway electrification in Iran. Note: Broad-gauge track is employed at the borders with Azerbaijan Republic and Turkmenistan which have 1,520 mm (4 ft 11 27/32 in) broad gauge rail systems; 41 km of the standard gauge, electrified track is in suburban service at Tehran (2007).

The majority of transport in Iran is road-based. The government plans to transport 3.5% of the passenger volume and 8.5% of the freight volume by rail. Extensive electrification is planned. According to the Ministry of R&T, the railway network expands by about 500 km per year.

=== Railway links with adjacent countries ===
In December 2014, a rail line from Iran opened to Turkmenistan and Kazakhstan. The opening of the line marks the first direct rail link between Iran, Kazakhstan and China and upon completion direct rail transport between China and Europe (while avoiding Russia) will be possible.

- Afghanistan – completed in 2020.
- Azerbaijan – break-of-gauge 1,435 mm (4 ft 8 1/2 in)/1,520 mm (4 ft 11 27/32 in) (Only to Nakhichevan, planned link to Azerbaijan proper for building Russia-Iran corridor)
- Armenia – planned – break of gauge 1,435 mm (4 ft 8 1/2 in)/1,520 mm (4 ft 11 27/32 in)
- Iraq – part under construction, part planned.
  - one long link from Arak via Kermanshah to Baghdad
  - one short link of about 50 km links Khorramshahr to Basra and is due for completion in 2006.
- Pakistan – break-of-gauge 1,435 mm (4 ft 8 1/2 in)/1,676 mm (5 ft 6 in) - missing link from Bam to Zahedan completed 2009.
- Turkey – via Lake Van – train ferry - 1,435 mm (4 ft 8 1/2 in)
- Turkmenistan – break-of-gauge 1,435 mm (4 ft 8 1/2 in)/1,520 mm (4 ft 11 27/32 in)

=== Couplings, brakes and electrification ===
- Couplers – SA3 and buffers
- Brakes – air
- Electrification – 25 kV AC

== Rapid transit ==
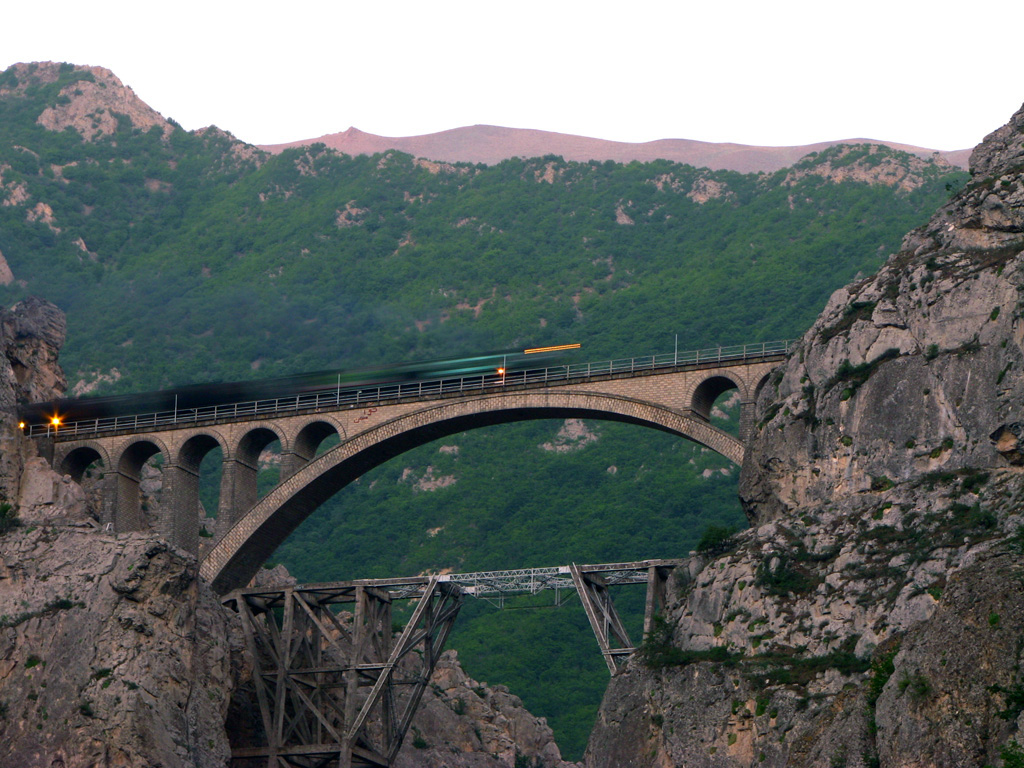
Veresk Bridge

=== Tehran Metro ===
The Tehran Metro is a rapid transit system in Tehran carrying 5 million passengers a day and consisting of seven lines that run a total of 200 kilometres (~120 mi) with two further lines under construction. The metro will have a final length of 430 kilometres (270 mi) once all nine lines are constructed by 2028. Metro services run from 5:30 to 23:00 throughout the city and the ticket price is 3,000-8,000 IRR (0.10-0.30 USD) and is based on distance of the trip.

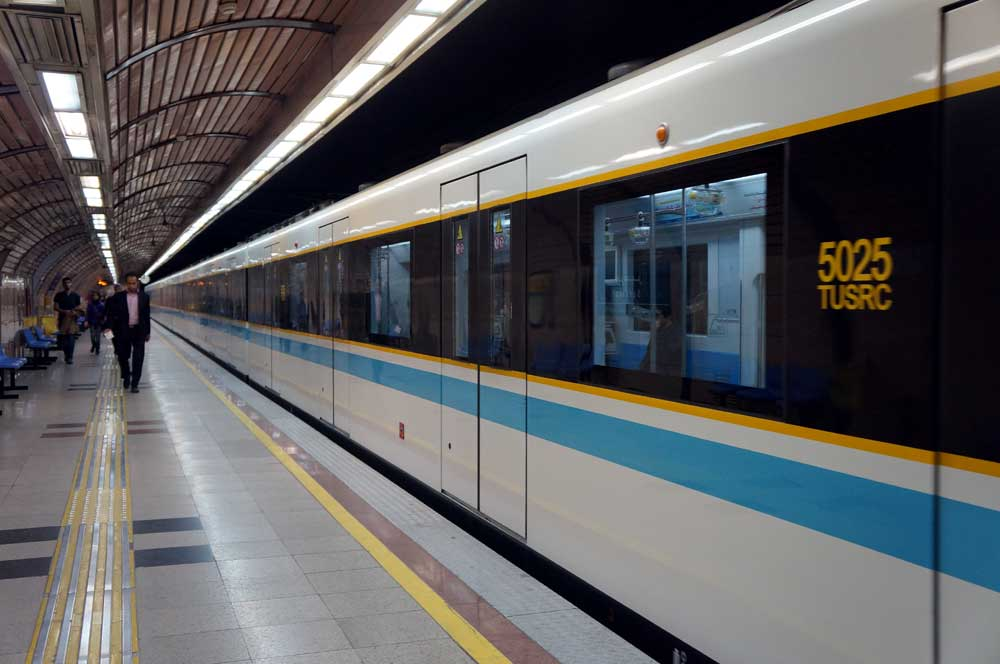
Tehran Metro

=== Tehran Bus Rapid Transit ===
The Tehran Bus Rapid Transit (BRT) is a rapid transit system serving Tehran which was officially inaugurated in 2008. The BRT has a network of over 150 kilometres, transporting 1.8 million passengers on a daily basis. The BRT has a total of ten lines with a further expansion planned to bring the total length to 300 kilometres. The price of Tehran's BRT is somewhere between 4,000IRR to 9,500IRR (0.15 to 0.35 USD).

=== Mashhad Urban Railway ===
The Mashhad Urban Railway is urban rail line in Mashhad, construction on line one began in 1999 and was opened on 24 April 2011. Line two has also been opened recently and finished construction. Four other lines are either being constructed or are planned to be. Mashhad Urban Railway operates its single line from 6:30 to 21:30 daily. It has a daily ridership of 130,000 passengers and has a total length of 24 kilometres (14.9 mi).

=== Isfahan Metro ===
The Isfahan Metro construction of line one commenced in 2001 and was finally opened to the public on 15 October 2015. Line one has a total length of 11 kilometres. The city is planning a second East to West line.

=== Shiraz Metro ===
The Shiraz Metro is a rapid transit system in Shiraz. Line one was officially inaugurated on 11 October 2014 after being in construction since 2011; the single line has a length of 10.5 kilometres (6.5 mi) and stops at six stations. Line 2 is currently under construction and has a length of 15 kilometres (9.3 mi). The metro currently has a daily ridership of 500 000 passengers with 27 trains in operation.

=== Tabriz Metro ===
The Tabriz Metro is a metro system serving the city of Tabriz. The first line was opened on 28 August 2015 with a 7-kilometre length and six stations. There is also a regional commuter line planned to the city of Sahand. Line one runs Northwest from El Goli Station to Noor Station.

=== Total Length ===
The total route length of the various Metros is 253 km.

== Roadways and automobiles ==
In 2011 the country had 173,000 kilometres (107,000 mi) of roads, of which 73% were paved. In 2008 there were nearly 100 passenger cars for every 1,000 inhabitants.

- Total: 172,927 km (2006)

- Paved: 125,908 km (includes 1,429 km of expressways)
- Unpaved: 47,019 km

Note: There were more than 11 million vehicles in Iran by 2010 mostly manufactured or assembled locally. As of 2015, 34,000 km of roads provided essential corridors of transportation, while 45,000 km of major roads and 100,000 km of roads connecting villages and rural areas have seen no maintenance and upkeep practices (worth a total of $57 billion). As of 2020, bicycles were used for less than 1% of urban trips.

=== Road accidents ===
Iran ranks 23rd worldwide in traffic deaths per 100,000 population per year, with a rate of 24.3, half the rate of the worst country, Eritrea. Iran ranks first worldwide in terms of having the largest number of road accidents with 38,000 deaths and injuries per year. Other sources place the total number of fatalities at 100,000 over the past six years or 20,000 per year on average (2008).

Transport officials say 46.8% of car accidents take place in cities, 21.5% outside, 19.5% on rural routes, 4.2% on urban highways and 4.2% on suburban highways. Pedestrians account for 45% of traffic deaths in Tehran.

The high death tolls in car accidents are blamed on high speed, unsafe vehicles, widespread disregard of traffic laws and inadequate emergency services.

Motorcycles account for 50% of sound pollution in Tehran and 40-45% of accidents.

== Waterways ==
There are no major rivers in Iran. Just Karun is navigable which "shallow-draft boats can negotiate from Khorramshahr to Ahvaz, a distance of about 180 km (110 mi)". The Shatt al-Arab is usually navigable by maritime traffic for about 130 km; channel has been dredged to 3 m and is in use.

== Pipelines ==
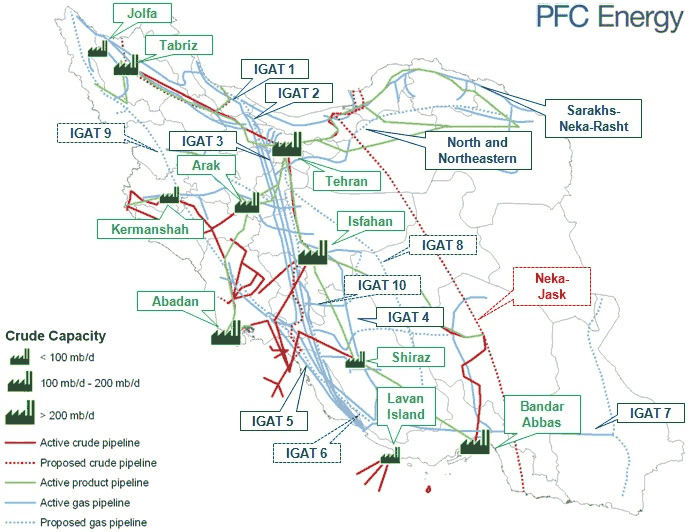
Iran Gas Trunkline

- Condensate 7 km; condensate/gas 12 km; gas 19,246 km; liquid petroleum gas 570 km; oil 7,018 km; refined products 7,936 km (2008)
- Iran is currently undergoing negotiations with neighboring Pakistan for the construction of an oil and gas pipeline to that country to help integrate their respective economies and solve the energy shortage being faced by Pakistan.

== Ports and harbours ==
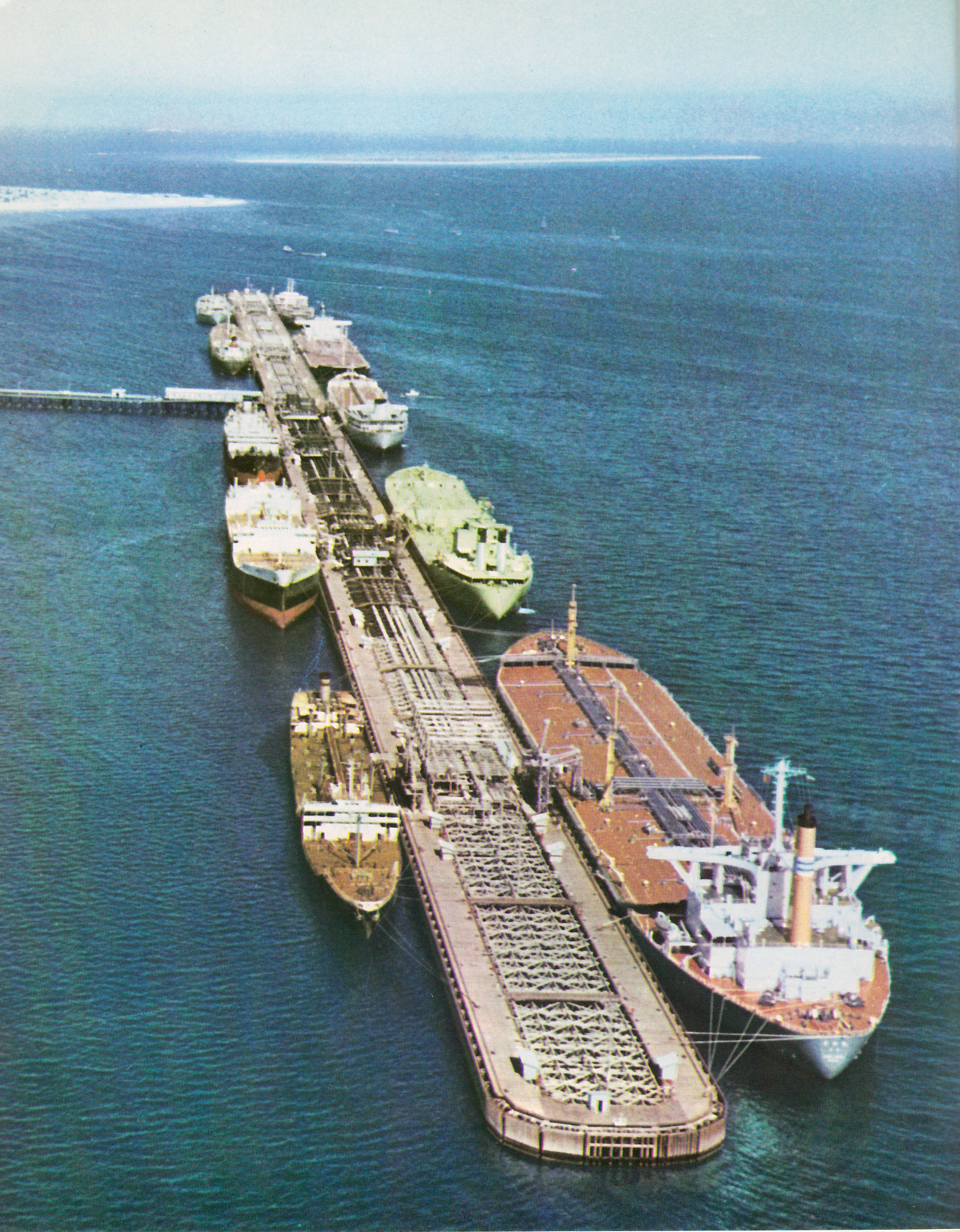
As of 2015, the Kharg oil terminal is handling about 90% of Iran's crude exports.

India–Iran–Afghanistan transport corridor map

The capacity of container loading and unloading in the country's ports is currently at 4.4 million which will increase to 7 million by the end of 2015. Port capacity will increase to 200 million tons in 2015 from 150 million tons in 2010.

All Iranian ports are supervised by the 'PMO', i.e. the 'Port & Maritime Organization', which is part of the Ministry of Roads and Urban Development.

- All ports: Abadan (largely destroyed in fighting during 1980–1988 war), Ahvaz, Bandar Abbas, Bandar-e Anzali (Caspian Sea), Bushehr, Bandar-e Emam Khomeyni, Bandar-e Lengeh, Bandar-e Mahshahr, Bandar-e Torkaman (Caspian Sea), Chabahar (Bandar-e Beheshti), Kharg Island, Lavan Island, Sirri Island, Khorramshahr (limited operation since November 1992), Noshahr (Caspian Sea), Arvand Kenar, Chabahar Port.
  - Main: Bandar-e Eman Khomeyni, Assaluyeh (Bushehr), Bandar Abbas, Chabahar Port.

Bandar Abbas, with capacity of 2.5 million TEU in 2010 and 3.3 million TEU in 2016, is in southern-central Iran and handles 90% of the country's container throughput. Bandar Abbas is run by the Shaheed Rajaee Port Authority.

Chabahar Port, the southernmost Iranian port, on the Gulf of Oman, a couple dozen kilometers from the Iran - Pakistan border, is being recently expanded and developed partly with Indian public funding, and in connection with the INSTC North-South overland transportation corridor linking Iran with Afghanistan, the Caucasus countries, Turkey and Russia.

- Major Export Terminals (loading capacity): Kharg Island 5,000,000 bbl/d (790,000 m^{3}/d), Lavan Island 200,000 bbl/d (32,000 m^{3}/d), Neka (Caspian Sea) 50,000 bbl/d (7,900 m^{3}/d), Assaluyeh 250,000 bbl/d (40,000 m^{3}/d) gas liquids, Kish Island, Abadan, Bandar-e Eman Khomeyni) and Bandar Mahshahr (latter 2 close-by ports are used mostly by NPC for petrochemicals export).
  - Major Oil/Gas Ports:
    - Kharg Island: is the largest and main export terminal in Iran. Roughly 90% of Iran's exports are sent via Kharg. Kharg's loading system has a capacity of 5.0 million bbl/d. The terminal processes all onshore production (the Iranian Heavy and Iranian Light Blends) and offshore production from the Froozan field (the Froozan Blend). The Kharg terminal includes the main T-jetty, the Sea Island that is located on the west side of Kharg, and the Dariush terminal to the south. Kharg Island relies on storage to ensure even operations, and its current storage capacity is expected to increase to 28 million barrels of oil in 2014.
    - Lavan Island, mostly handles exports of the Lavan Blend sourced from offshore fields. Lavan is Iran's highest-quality export grade and one of Iran's smallest streams. Lavan's production averaged less than 100,000 bbl/d in 2013, but the Lavan facilities have the capacity to process 200,000 bbl/d of crude oil. Lavan has a two-berth jetty, which can accommodate vessels up to 250,000 deadweight tons. Lavan's storage capacity is 5.5 million barrels.
    - Sirri Island: serves as a loading port for the Sirri Blend that is produced in the offshore fields of the same name. The Sirri terminal includes a loading platform equipped with four loading arms that can load tankers from 80,000 to 330,000 deadweight tons. Its storage capacity is 4.5 million barrels.
    - Ras Bahregan.

== Merchant marine ==
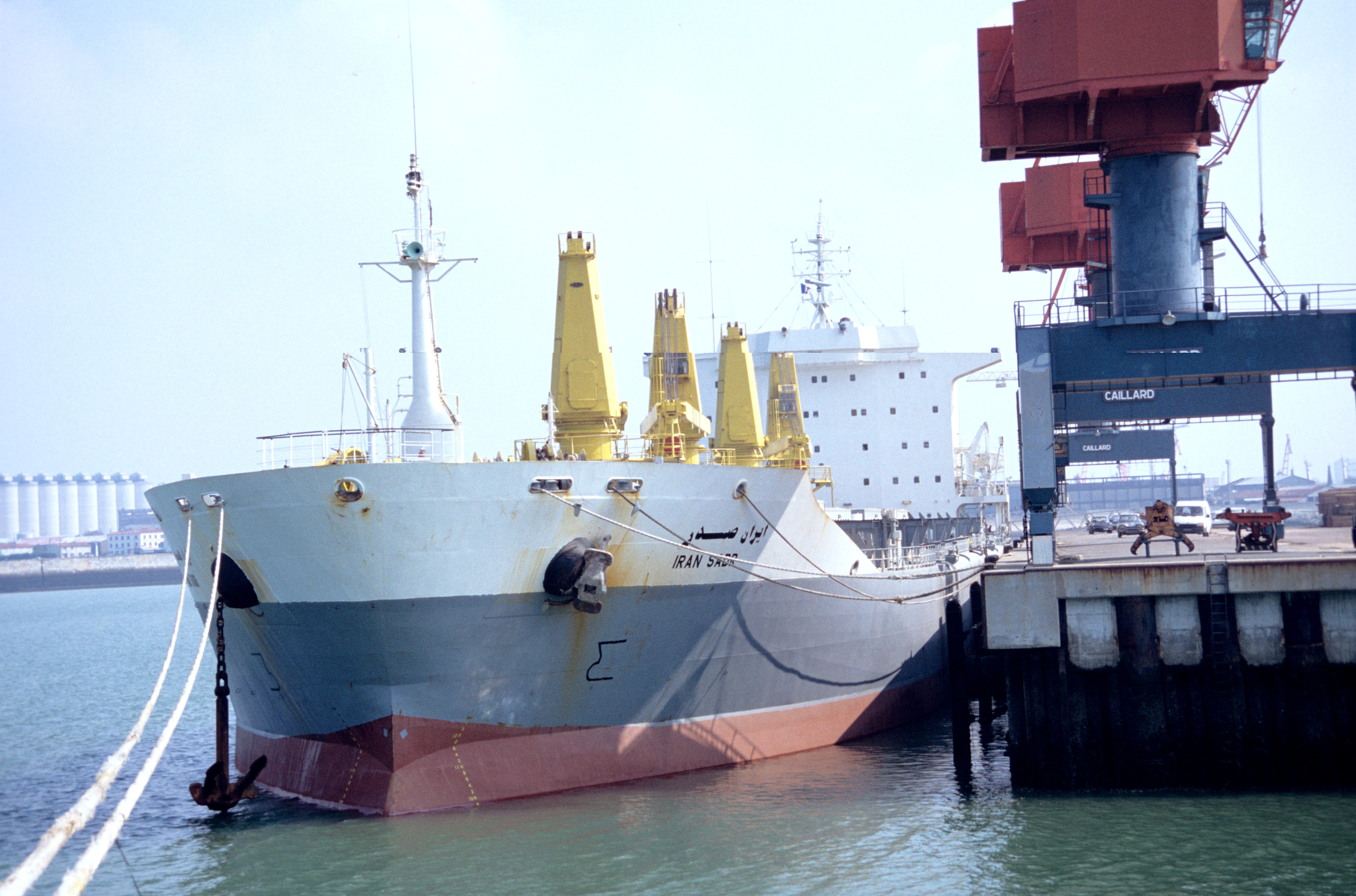
The International Maritime Organization has 140 member states with Iran ranking among the top 20

- Total: 76 (2013)
- By type: bulk carrier 8, cargo 51, chemical tanker 3, container 4, liquefied gas 1, passenger/cargo 3, petroleum tanker 2, refrigerated cargo 2, roll on/roll off 2
- Foreign-owned: 2 (UAE 2)
- Registered in other countries: 71 (Barbados 5, Cyprus 10, Hong Kong 3, Malta 48, Panama 5) (2010)
- Shipping freight (important for liquid natural gas (LNG) exports) will grow by an average of 5.3% a year in the 2009–2013.

Over the next two decades, Iran would need 500 new ships, including 120 oil tankers, 40 liquefied natural gas (LNG) carriers and over 300 commercial vessels.

== Airports and airlines ==
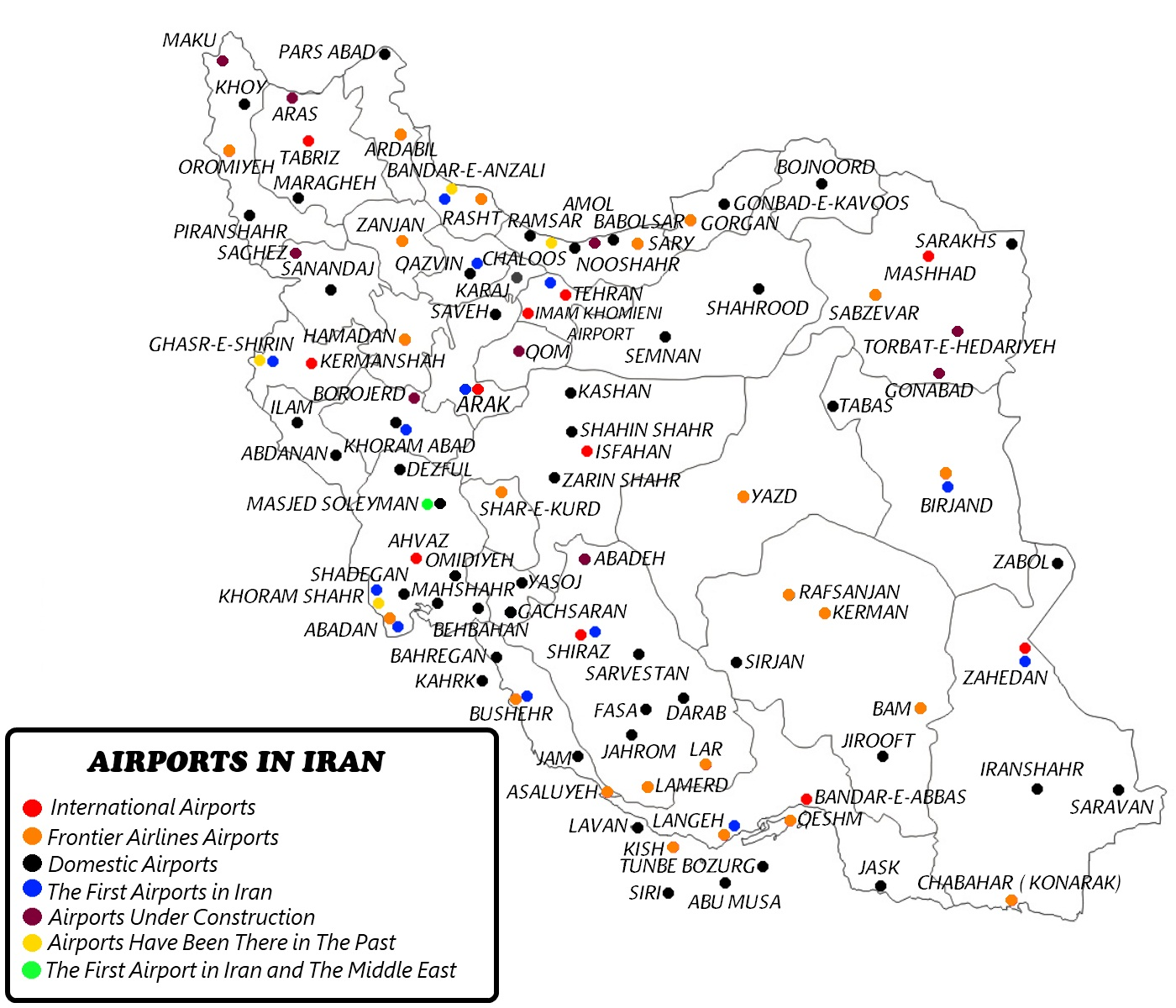
Airports in Iran

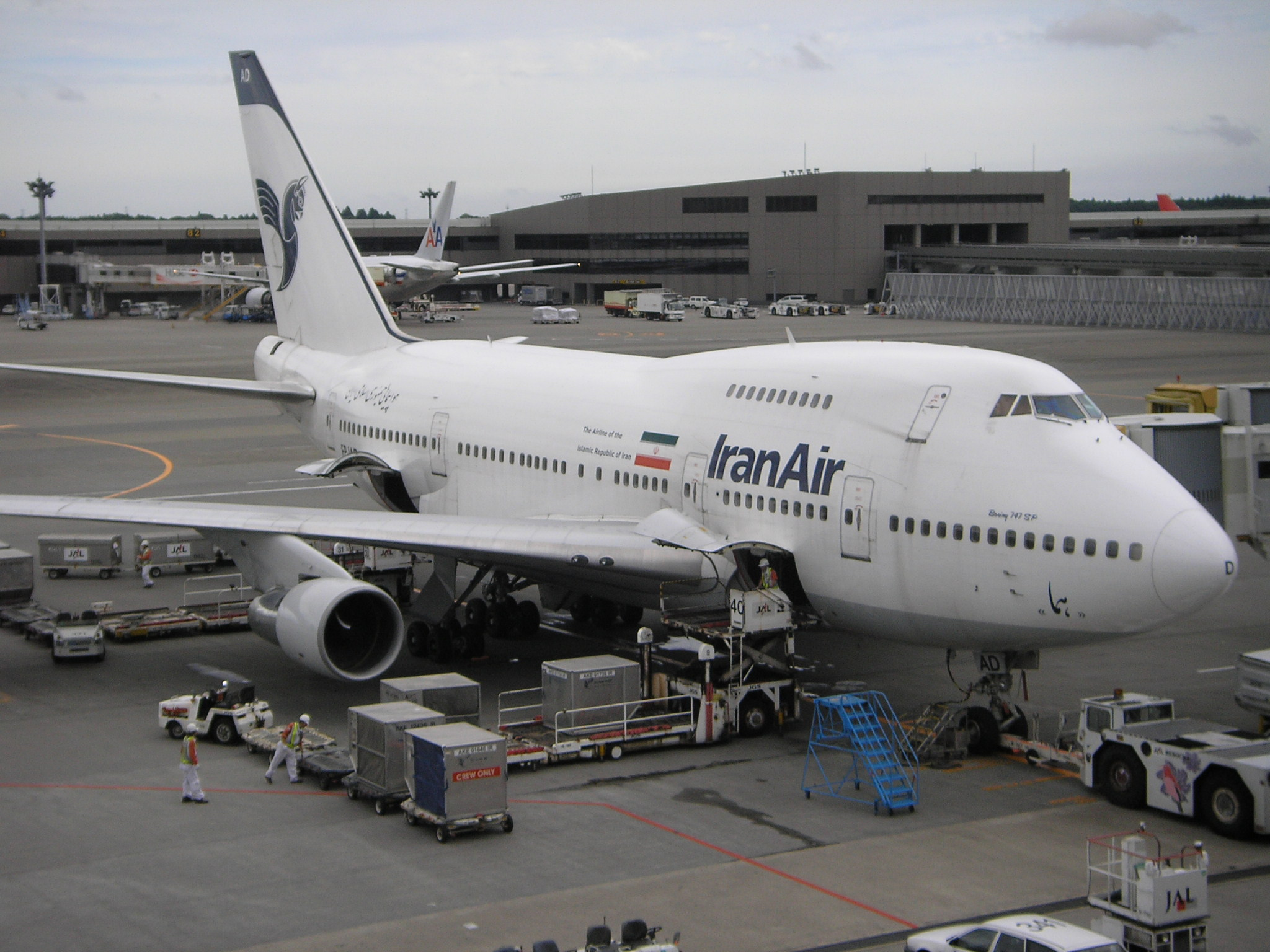
Iran Air Boeing 747SP at Narita International Airport

Iran handles about 50 million passengers annually (2016). Iran's airports are improving their international connections, and Arak Airport in Markazi province has recently begun to operate international flights, making a total of five such airports in the country, in addition to ten local airports. In May 2007 international flights into the capital, Tehran, were moved to the Imam Khomeini International Airport (IKIA), just outside the city because of capacity constraints at the existing central Mehrabad Airport.

- Airports: 319 (2013)
- There are 54 "major" airports in Iran (2008): 8 international, 21 air border, and 25 domestic.
- Number of flights from airports nationwide reached 31,088 in a month (October 20 – November 20, 2008): 10,510 domestic, 4,229 international and 15,404 transit.
- Airport capacity for departures and arrivals: 73 million persons (2011)
- Number of passengers departing and arriving at airports: 40.1 million persons (2011)
- Share of non-public sector in domestic flights: 60% (2011)
- Share of non-public sector in international flights: 58.7% (2011)

National airline:

- Iran Air handles 6 million passengers annually (2016)

=== Airports – with paved runways ===
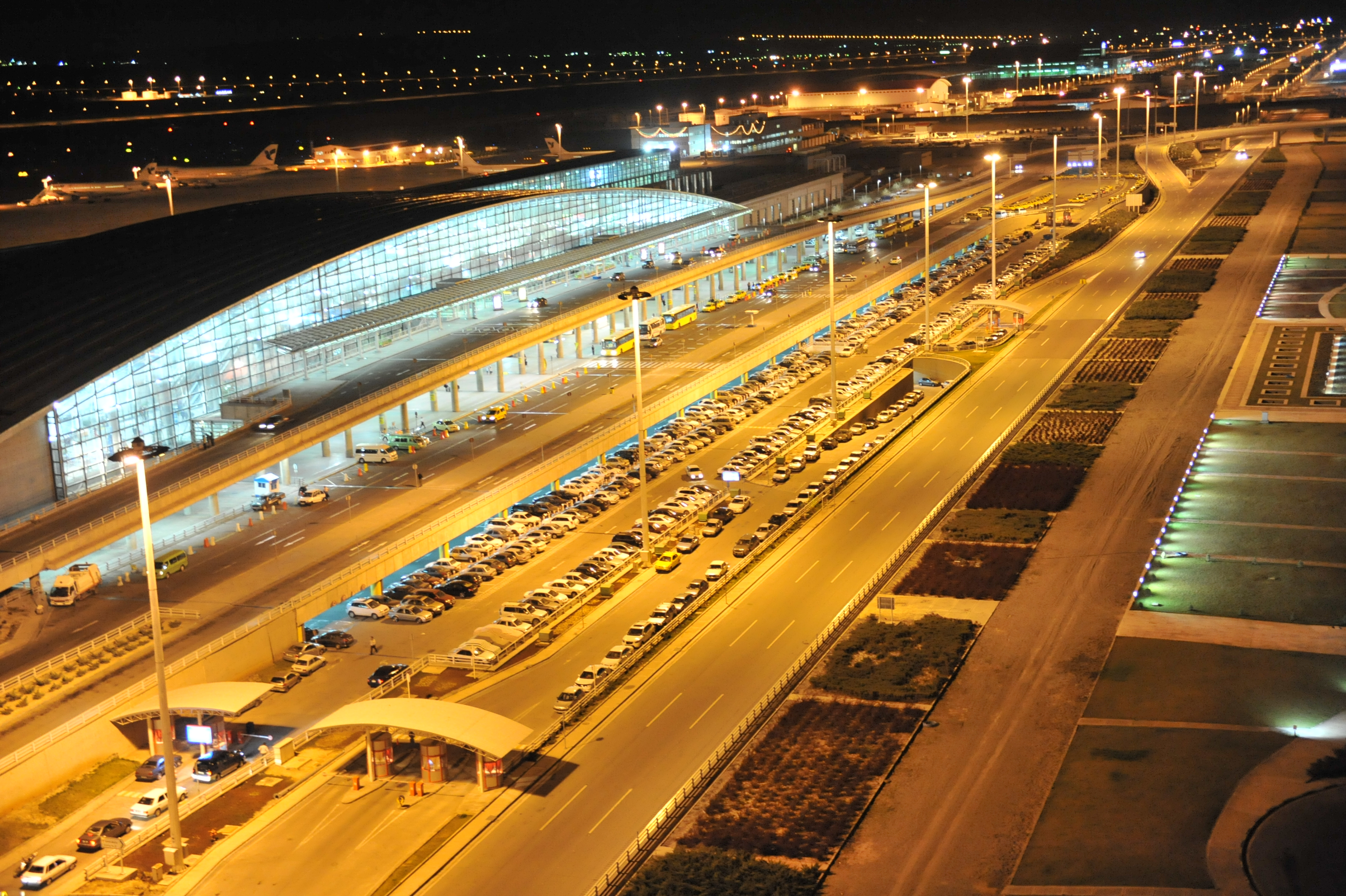
Imam Khomeini International Airport

Total: 140 (2013)

over 3,047 m: 42

2,438 to 3,047 m: 29

1,524 to 2,437 m: 26

914 to 1,523 m: 36

under 914 m: 7 (2013)

=== Airports – with unpaved runways ===
Total: 179 (2013)

over 3,047 m: 1

1,524 to 2,437 m: 2

914 to 1,523 m: 135

under 914 m: 32 (2013)

=== Heliports ===
Total: 26 (2013)

== Transit statistics ==
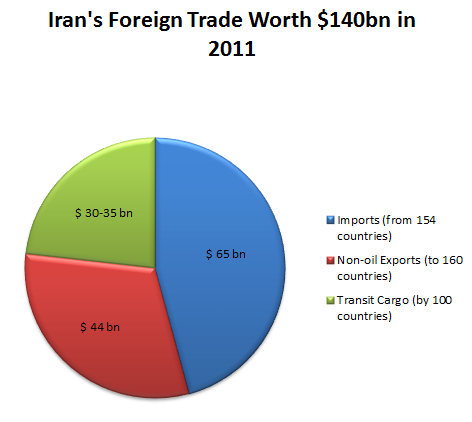
Iran's non-oil international trade (2011)

=== People ===
- In 2011, some 27 million travelers and businessmen passed custom departments.
- Over five million passengers have been transported via border points mainly Mehran and Bazargan.
- In 2002, about 70% of visitors arrived by land, about 29% by air and less than 1% by sea

=== Commodities ===
- In 2011, cargoss and commodities from 100 countries have been transported across Iran. Over 10.5 million tons of oil products and non-oil commodities were transited via land (91% via road and 9% via railroad) and marine borders.
- In 2010, 10 million tons of commodities from 110 countries, worth $31.5 billion, transited through Iran for 82 destinations.
- In 2009, the value of goods transited was about $25 billion. This figure constitutes 7% of the GDP.
- From March 22, 2009 until September 22, 2009 over 3 million tons of goods worth some $11.3 billion were transited through Iran. Regarding the countries of origin, China was first in terms of volume, Turkmenistan ranked second, Uzbekistan came third, Turkey fourth, and the United Arab Emirates fifth. Among the destinations, Afghanistan was first, Iraq second, Azerbaijan third, the UAE fourth, and Turkmenistan ranked fifth.
- Some 33 million tons of goods and 29 million passengers are transported annually by the rail transportation network, accounting for 9% and 11% of the whole transportations in the country (2011).
- Per capita parcel post for each Iranian stands at 15 per annum (2008).
- One million tons of commodities, fuel and barter have been transited abroad per month (2008).
  - Fuel is transported in Iran by road tankers, tank wagons, tanker ships as well as through pipelines. Nearly 10,000 tankers from 400 private sector companies transport fuel by road. In 2013, nearly 87 billion liters of fuel were transported by Iranian tankers. Iran's tank wagons and ships transported 3 billion liters and 8 billion liters of fuel, respectively.
  - 3.498 million tons of non-oil commodities were transited abroad via Iran during March 20-November 20, 2008 (79% of the commodities were transited by road).

==== Mode of transport ====
- More than 90% of the country's imports and exports, particularly in the fisheries and oil sectors, are undertaken through the sea (2009).
- In 2008, 84% of the transited goods through Iran were transported through roads while the rest was transported via railroad.

==== Port of entry ====
- In 2011, Bandar Abbas was the country's most active border in terms of transit (37%), followed by Parvizkhan (17%), Bazargan (9%) and Bashmaq (7%).
- In 2008, some 24 border crossings except Kileh in Sardasht (West Azarbaijan) and Yazdan in Southern Khorasan were active nationwide. Bandar Abbas, contributing 40.8% of transit operations, was considered the most dynamic in terms of transiting cargo. It was followed by Bazargan (16.6%), Sarakhs (14.1%), Bandar Anzali (9.2%) and Pileh-Savar (3.9%).

==== Economics ====
- Every ton of transit cargo earns $150 for the country and creates 40 jobs. Iran will earn a revenue of US$12 billion when the volume of goods transported through the country reaches 40 million tons annually.

=== TRACECA ===
In September 2009, Iran formally joined the Transport Corridor Europe – Caucasus – Asia (TRACECA) programme, also known as the "new Silk Road." TRACECA was founded in 1998 with the aim of promoting economic relations, trade and transport communications between Europe, the Caucasus and Asia. This programme consists of the EU and 14 member states (including Iran) from Eastern Europe and the Caucasus. Iran's strategic location means that it is a key transport corridor between Europe and Central Asia.

In August 2010, Iran declared that it "did not sign on to TRACECA project" and said it has been fostering improved transport links through a series of bilateral agreements with neighboring states instead. According to Iran's first Vice-President Mohammad-Reza Rahimi "If all the potential of the country's transit sector is tapped, it can bring in as much revenues as [the] oil [industry]". He also announced that Iran will join China and Europe by rail in the near future.

== See also ==
- Ministry of Roads and Transportation
- International Rankings of Iran in Transport
- Snapp – Iran's "Uber"
- Tehran Metro
- List of airlines of Iran
- 2007 Gasoline Rationing Plan in Iran
- Iranian Economic Reform Plan
- Privatization in Iran
- Environmental issues in Iran
- Economy of Iran
- List of Major Iranian Companies
- Communications in Iran
- Energy in Iran
- North-South Transport Corridor
- Iran travel guide from Wikivoyage – Transport in Iran
