= Subsidies in Iran =

Government finance to reduce prices in Iran

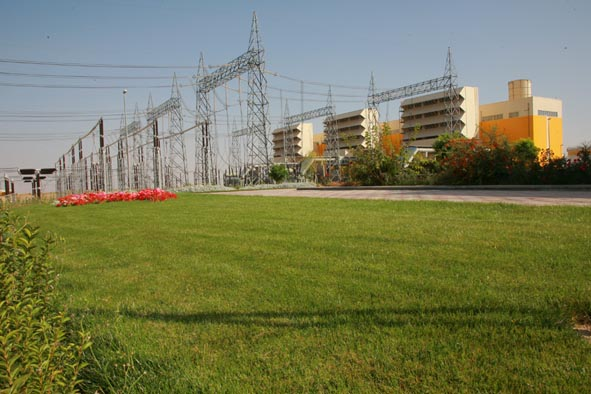
From one of the lowest energy intensity users in the world in 1980, Iran has become one of the major consumers of energy with very high energy intensity.

The economy of Iran includes a lot of subsidies. Food items, such as flour and cooking oil, are subsidized, along with fuels such as gasoline. However cutting subsidies can cause civil unrest.

The Iranian targeted subsidy plan (Persian: طرح هدفمندسازی یارانه‌ها), also known as the subsidy reform plan, was passed by the Iranian Parliament in 2010. The government described the subsidy plan as the "biggest surgery" to the nation's economy in half a century and "one of the most important undertakings in Iran's recent economic history". The goal of the subsidy reform plan is to replace subsidies on food and energy (80% of total) with targeted social assistance, in accordance with a Five Year Economic Development Plan and a move towards free market prices in a 5-year period. The subsidy reform plan is the most important part of a broader Iranian economic reform plan.

According to the government, approximately $100 billion per year is spent on subsidizing energy prices ($45 billion for the prices of fuel alone) and many consumable goods including bread, sugar, rice, cooking oil and medicine. However, some experts believe direct subsidies are valued at about $30 billion, depending on oil prices.

The subsidy system has been inherited from the Iran–Iraq War era but was never abolished. Iran is one of the largest gasoline consumers in the world, ranking second behind the United States in consumption per car. The government subsidy reform has been years in the making, for reasons which are unclear. Iran's Supreme Leader has backed the government’s subsidy reform plan.

== Objectives ==
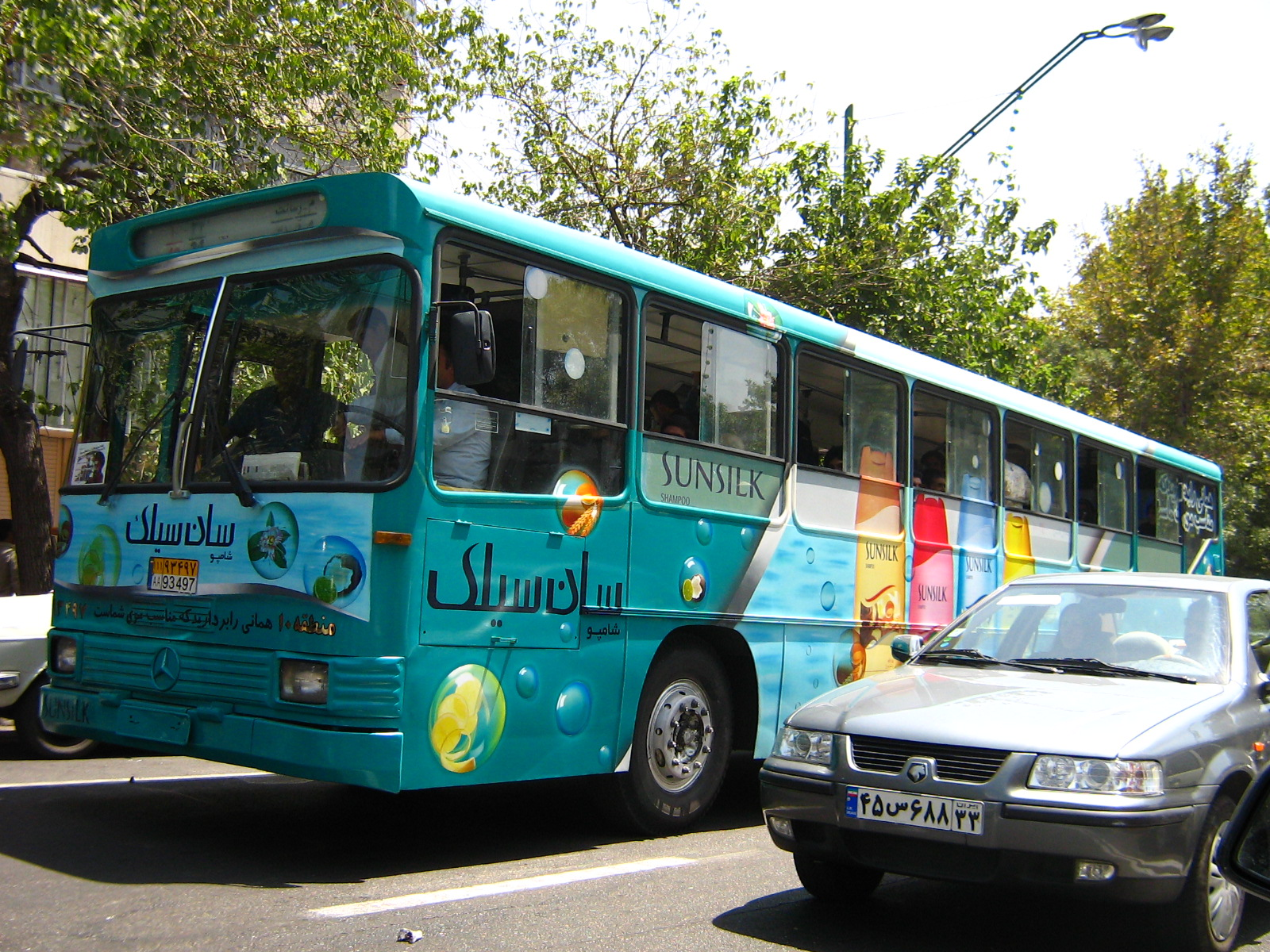
According to the Iranian government, $100 billion is spent on subsidies each year. The reform plan aims to encourage public transport by decreasing fuel subsidies.

Iran spends the largest share of GDP on fossil fuel subsidies in the world. Many Iranian experts agree that these unsustainable subsidies encourage waste among goods, including in the production sector, ranging from gasoline to bread that must be stopped and the only way to do that is to redirect subsidies.

The stated goal of the subsidy reform is "to rejuvenate Iran's economy, increase productivity, give it a new footing and bring it out of the slump it has been in for so long". Concretely, the government plans to replace the subsidies with targeted social assistance. Consequences of the economic reform plan are that Iran will be less vulnerable to US sanctions because it will reduce fuel imports. The reform plan will also save money for the Iranian people because it will end a multibillion-dollar-a-year contraband (17% percent of fuel production in Iran is smuggled abroad daily). Due to subsidies, Iran had long had one of the cheapest gas prices in the world, 10 cents per liter or 40 cents per gallon.

Implementation of the plan will reduce waste and consumerism. In fact, according to official data, the higher income strata of the population has enjoyed the same subsidies as the poor until now. Subsidies reduction will also reduce air pollution by reducing car traffic in Tehran. Finally, the subsidy plan will increase social justice through targeted social assistance. According to official data, the richest tenth of households benefits 12 times more from gasoline subsidies than the poorest tenth. Overall, implementation of the plan will increase productivity, efficiency, competitiveness of Iran's economy, economic growth, oil exports and per capita income (all other things being equal).

== Implementation ==
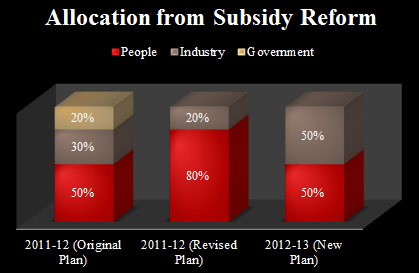
Iran wants to save up to $100 billion on subsidies within three to four years.

For implementation of the bill, an entity has been established as a duly authorized governmental company under the name "Targeting Subsidies Organization".

The amount saved by the government, will be distributed as follows: 50% towards the poorest strata of Iranian society; 20% at the government's disposal (to compensate for increased costs or as safety net); and the remaining 30% will be directed towards improving the efficiency of the utility, fuel and energy production infrastructure, public transportation development, industry and farming.

The plan will commence with energy, fuel and utilities in the first year and consumable goods will start in the second year. The start of the cuts will coincide with the beginning of the second half of the Iranian year on Sept. 23, 2010. At that time, the 2007 Gas rationing plan will come to an end.

=== Budgeting ===
In March 2010, the Iranian Parliament approved a $347 billion budget, in which the allocation from subsidies and the oil price were set at $20 billion and $65 per barrel, respectively. According to the Vice President for Parliamentary Affairs, Iran's subsidy reforms would save 20 percent of the country's budget. Iran wants to save up to $100 billion on subsidies within three to four years. In 2011, the Iranian parliament approved a $508 billion budget based on $80/barrel oil price. This bill also factors in $54 billion from price hikes and subsidy cuts.

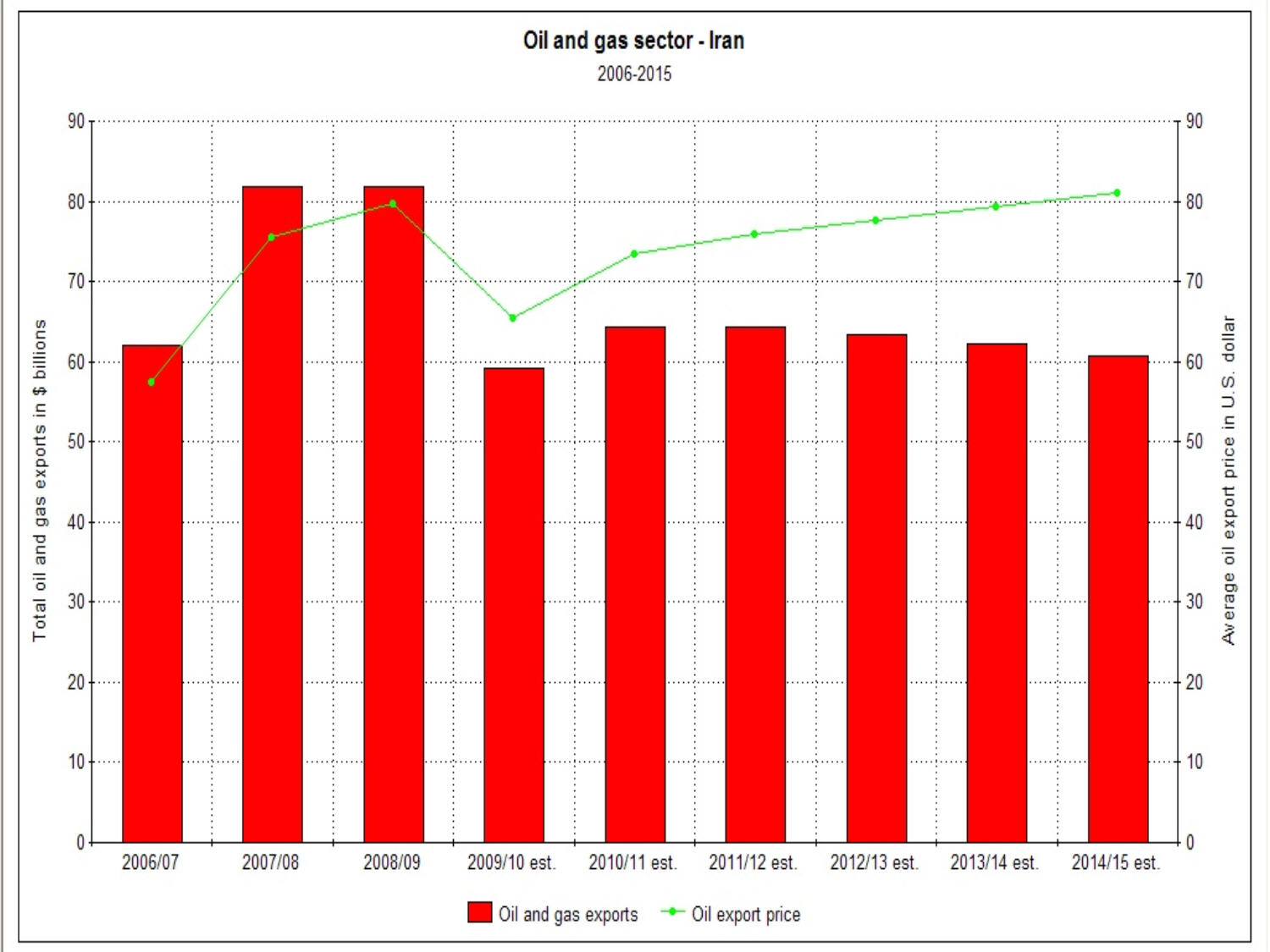
Iran's oil and gas projected revenues by the International Monetary Fund. Iranian officials estimate that Iran's annual oil and gas revenues could reach as much as $250 billion by 2015.

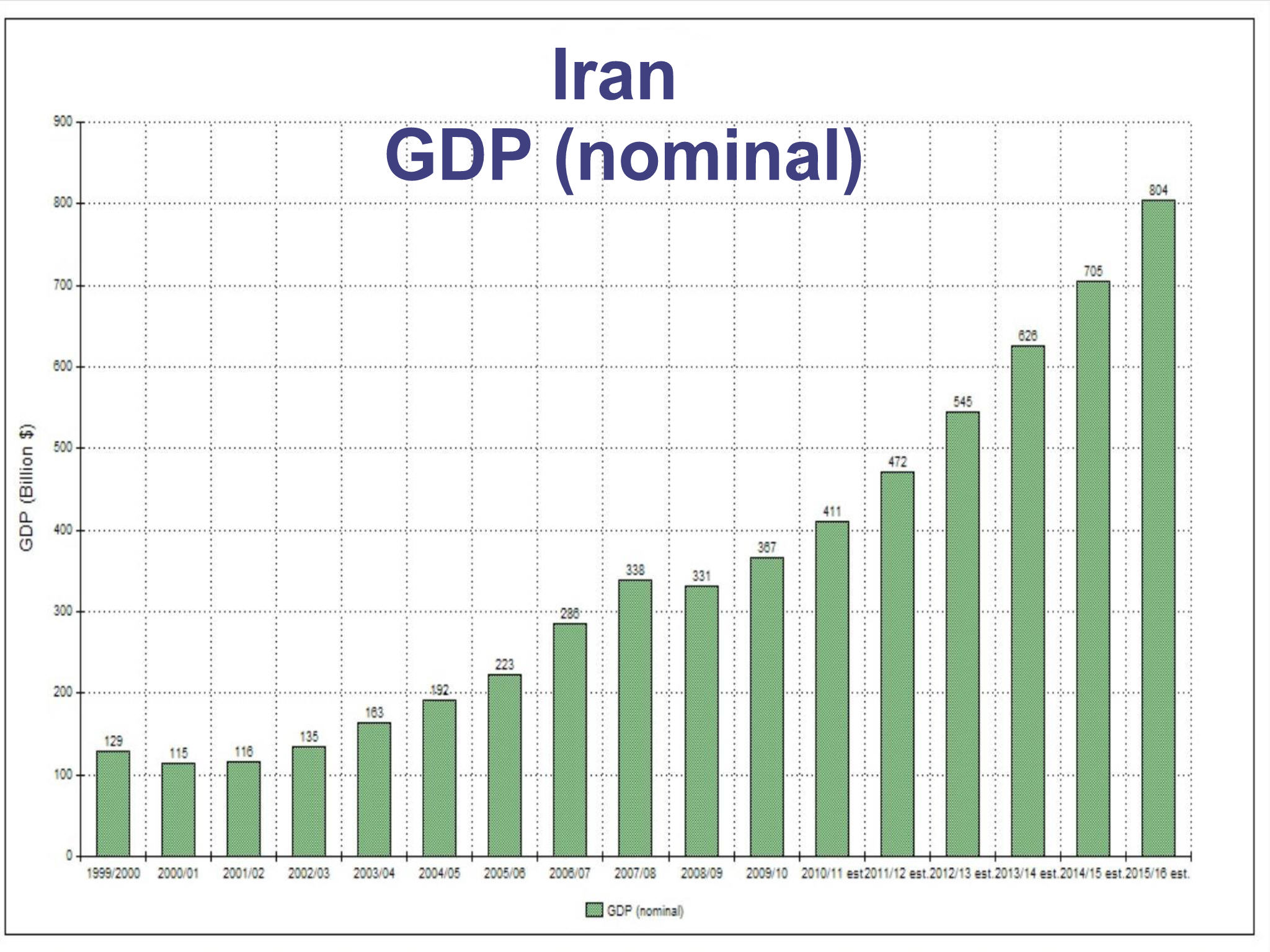
Iran's GDP projections, 1999-2015 est.

IMF Projections/Scenarios
	as at 2008/09	2014/15 Baseline	2014/15 Energy price reform
Real GDP growth	−3.7%	3.5%	~8% (1/3 from productivity improvement)
Real GDP growth (non-oil)	2.9%	3.8%	~8%
Crude oil exports	2.4 Mb/d	1.8 Mb/d	~2.5 Mb/d
Current account	7.2%	0.2%	~2.5%
CPI inflation	25.4%	10%	~7% (peaking above 30% in 2011)
Gross official reserves	$80 billion	$98 billion	~$170 billion

Overview of 2011–12 budget and comparison with 2010–2011 budget.
Item	2011–12	2010–11	% Change
General Budget, of which	170	129	31.8%
Development Expenditure	35	31.7	10.4%
General Expenditures & Other Items	135	97.3	38.7%
Budget for State-Owned Banks and Enterprises	355	252.5	40.6%
Total*	508	368.4	37.9%
Resources from Subsidies Phase Out	54	20	171.7%

* Totals may not add up due to rounding and deduction of double-counted items Note: all numbers are in billion dollars.

=== Income data ===
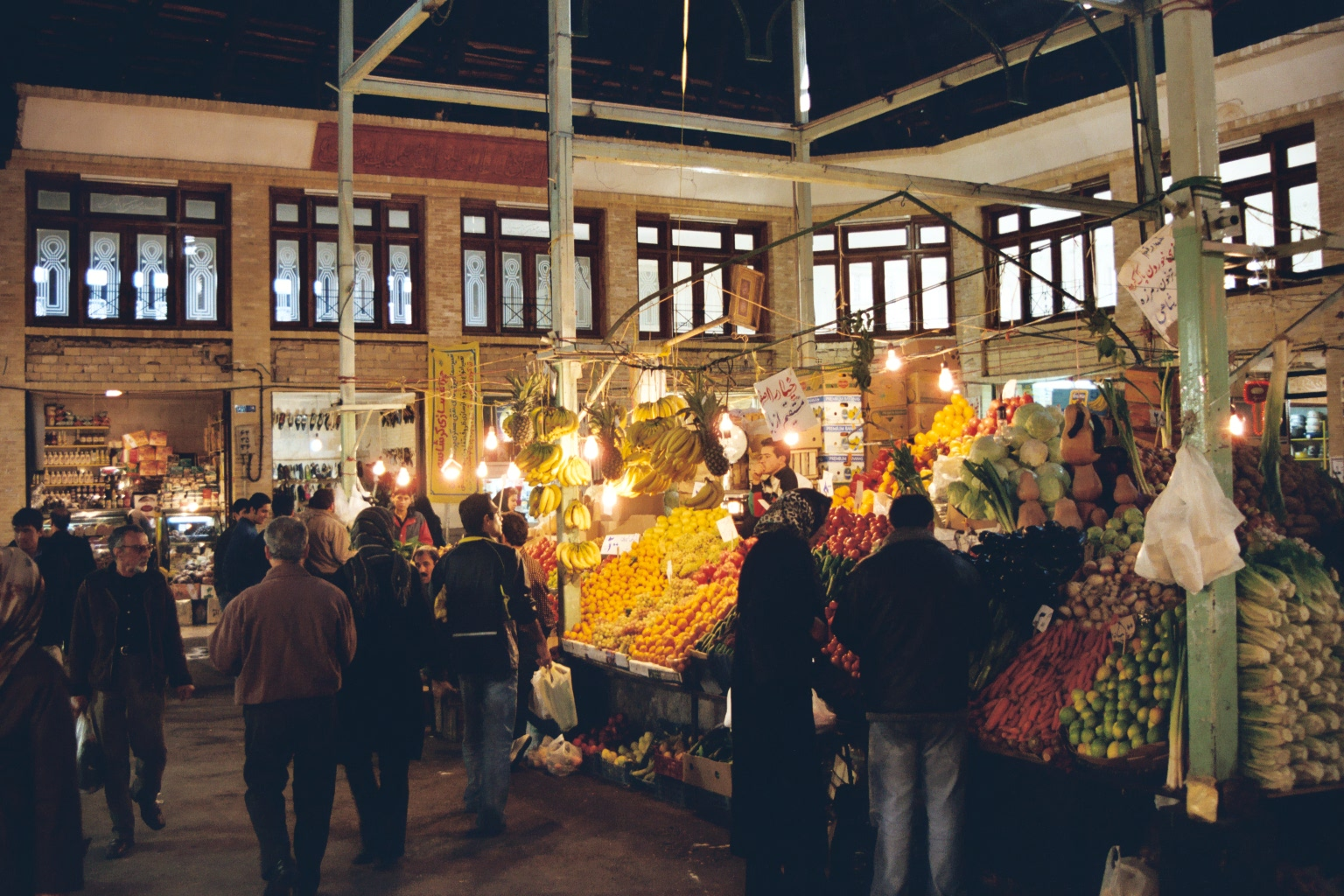
According to the IMF, until recently a four-member Iranian household received an average of $4,000 a year in subsidies for oil and natural gas, compared with a typical annual income of about $3,600 a year.

According to the IMF, until recently a four-member Iranian household received an average of $4,000 a year in subsidies for oil and natural gas, compared with a typical annual income of about $3,600 a year.

In 2010, Iran's Department of Statistics announced that 10 million Iranians live under the absolute poverty line and 30 million live under the relative poverty line. President Mahmoud Ahmadinejad says implementation of the targeted subsidy system will eradicate unemployment and poverty in Iran within three years.

==== Data collection ====
The administration has said earlier that it will be able to allocate different payment amounts to different people. To that end, in 2009, forms were distributed asking Iranians to report income, assets and property but the question remains on how the government will verify this information gathered by self-reporting. Many people have chosen not to report or withhold information. The administration has categorized the people into three income brackets; namely lower, middle, and higher for the implementation of the subsidy reform plan. On the other side, it was not clear in what form the compensation would be distributed, direct cash or goods. Another concern is the accuracy of government information on family incomes.

In September 2010, Iran's Statistics Bureau announced that implementation was delayed by one month because they were still collecting information regarding the financial situation of households and opening bank accounts for them.

=== Plan revision ===
Later in 2010, the government announced that it had revised its plan because of lack of reliable data on personal incomes. To ease the economic loss from lost subsidies, the government indicated it would distribute $40 per person/month (i.e. 455,000 rials/month) to 90% of the general population, starting on December 18, 2010.

Original vs. Revised plan
Item	Original/Budgeted plan (2010)	Revised plan (2011)
% population receiving cash handouts	50%	>90%
Amount re-directed from subsidies	$20 billion/year	<$54 billion/year
Cash handout per capita/month	$25	$40
Cost in 2011 budget for this handout	$10 billion	>$30–35 billion (>$2.5 billion/month)
Amount allocated for production & government from subsidies re-direct	$10 billion ($6 billion for production and $4 billion for government to cover increased costs)	>$10 billion for production

=== Price adjustments ===
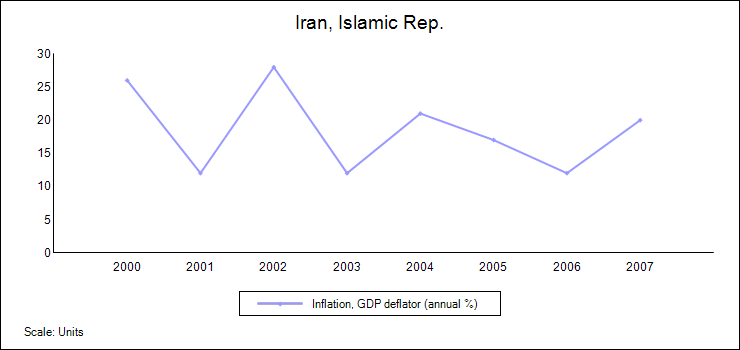
Between 2002 and 2006, the rate of inflation in Iran has been fluctuating between 12 and 16%.

The government took control of deciding how much the prices should rise in a year, as long as the subsidy cuts on gasoline and other refined products, natural gas, electricity, water, food (sugar, rice, cooking oil and bread), health and education are between $10 and 20 billion dollars annually. Estimates indicate that the government has to increase existing prices by an average of 2.5 times to achieve the lower target and by 4 times for the maximum target. According to the IMF, Iranians can expect the first price hike to lift energy product prices between four and 20 times previous levels, with prices surging even higher eventually.

==== Other determinants ====
According to the plan, the type of consumption (i.e. whether agricultural, industrial and civil) will also be considered when setting energy prices. The subsidy plan will be implemented in proportion with geographical regions because warm regions consume more electricity during summer while cold regions consume more gas during winter. Finally, the time of consumption (i.e. during peak and off-peak hours) and the consumption demand (i.e. whether it is low or high) will be taken into consideration.

Commodity (or service)	Old Price (as of 12/17/2010)	New Price/Increase (as of 12/18/2010)	Initial decrease in consumption (as of 01/01/2011)	Target price (by 2015)
Gasoline	10 cents/liter; 40 cents/liter (beyond 60 liters/month)	40 cents/liter; 70 cents/liter (beyond the quota, except for public service cars which receive a higher quota)	5–20% (from 64 million to 53 million liters/day)	Prices for oil derivatives not less than 90% of the prices in the Persian Gulf market (f.o.b) ($0.88-0.91 per liter as of 2014)
Diesel	$0.06/gallon	$0.6/gallon ($1.4/gallon on the open market)	20% (from 54 to 41 million liters/day)	—N/a
Natural gas	1-1.3 cents/m^{3} for households and 0.5 cents/m^{3} for power plants	>500% price increase; on average 7 cents/m^{3} for households and industry and 8 cents/m^{3} for power plants	6% (for cooking gas)	75% of the average export price for the general population; 65% of the average export price for petrochemical companies for 10 years.
CNG	4 cents/m^{3}	30 cents/m^{3}	—N/a	—N/a
Electricity	1.6 cents/KWh	<300%	11%	at production cost (8 cents/KWh as of 2010; 10 cents in 2015)
Water	9 cents/m^{3}	25–37 cents/m^{3}; 300-400% increase (2,500 rials/m^{3} for household usage; 4,128 rials/m^{3} for industrial usage)	5%	at production cost (~10,000 rials/m^{3} for household usage)
Bread (loaf of brick oven bread)	5–20 cents; Wheat: 1 cent/kg	200% (40 cents); Wheat: 28–30 cents/kg. Price of bread increased again to 45 cents in April 2011.	—N/a	—N/a
Taxi & inter-city buses	—N/a	10–18% (city buses, domestic flights and the metro, are not allowed to raise prices at all)	—N/a	—N/a
Air+rail transport	—N/a	>30% (not yet implemented)	—N/a	—N/a

Starting in April 2012, Iran's consumers have been hit with a wave of rising prices that has now touched laundry detergent and food items such as cooking oil, rice, eggs and dairy products. Since April 2012, the price of food and other consumer products have risen between 10 and 20% in some cases.

The latest official data comparing prices of foodstuffs in the second week of April 2012 to the corresponding period in 2011 showed dairy products rose about 42 per cent, red meat 47.5 per cent, rice about 29 per cent, beans 45.7 per cent, vegetables 92 per cent, sugar 33 per cent and vegetable oil 30 per cent. The price of chicken nearly tripled since 2011.

=== Consumption patterns ===
As of October 2011, consumption of liquefied petroleum gas, gasoline, kerosene, and diesel has cut between 4 and 19%, despite the fact that more than 1 million cars have been added to Iran's fleet. Increased use of compressed natural gas (CNG) to fuel cars has also reportedly played a role in this. According to the government, if oil products consumption had not been managed, consumption of gasoline would have increased to 120 million liters per day, while by reforming consumption pattern the figure has fallen to 60 million liters per day. In November 2011, the Government reported that the subsidy reform plan has saved Iran $6 billion.

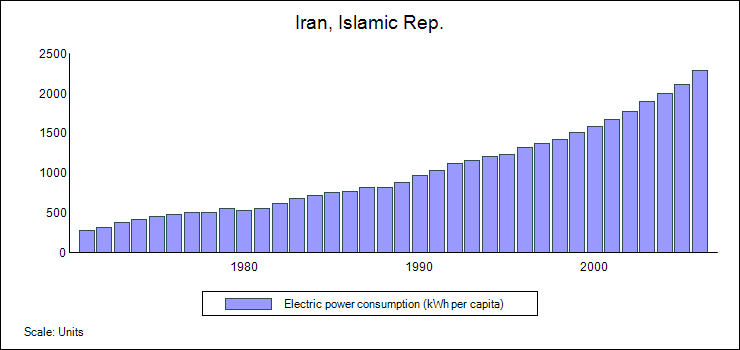
Subsidizing fuel prices has been the primary factor accounting for a 500 percent rise in Iran's domestic energy consumption over the past three decades, while the size of the population has doubled over the same period.

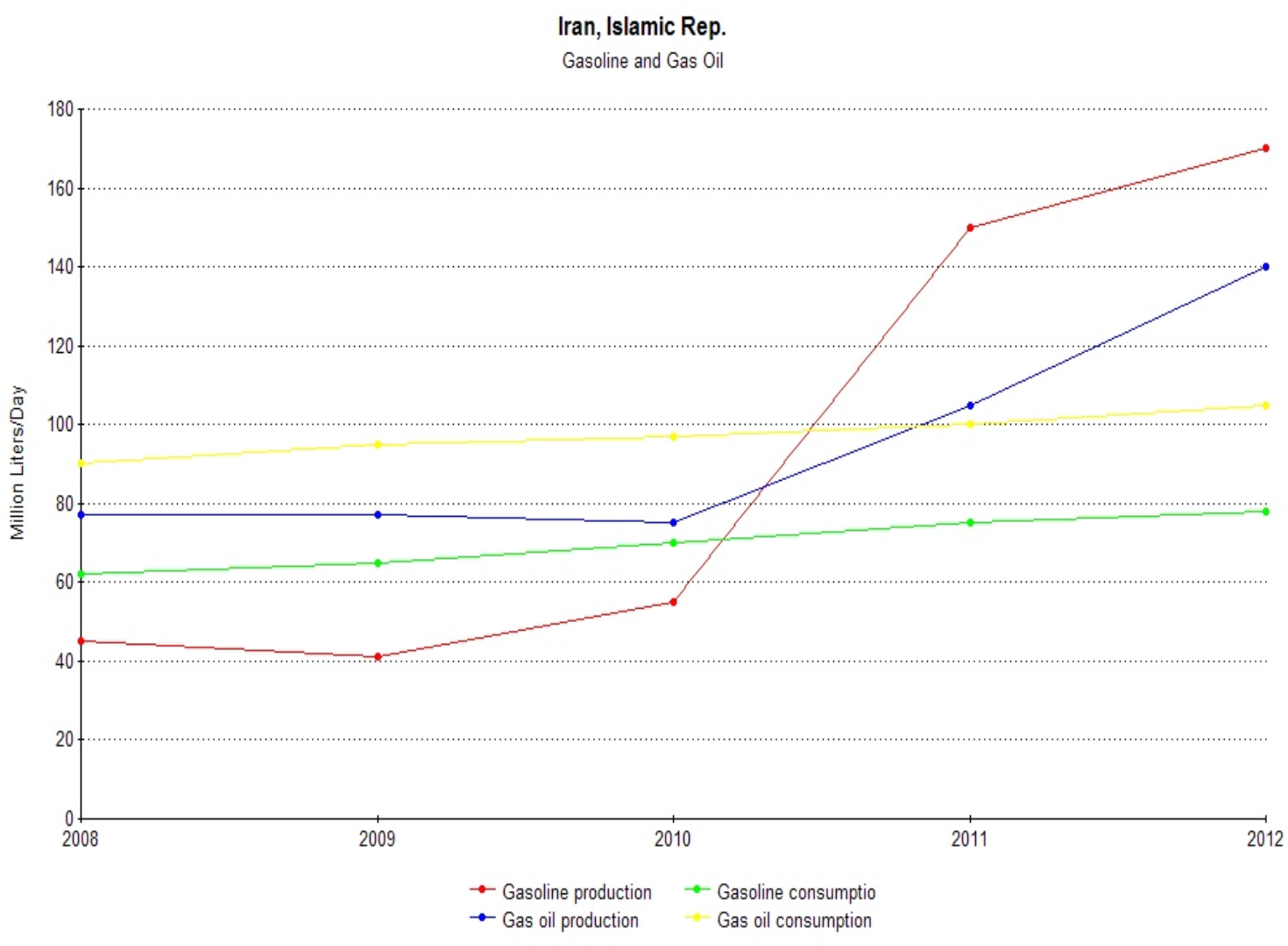
Iran's gasoline and gas-oil production and consumption projection (2008–2012)

Savings
Item	2010	2011	Reduction in consumption (2010–11)	Savings (as of January 2012)
Petrol	62.8mn liters/day	59.3mn liters/day	3.5mn liters/day	$2.1 billion (for gas oil)
Liquid gas (CNG)	12.3mn liters/day	11mn liters/day	1.3mn liters/day	$200 million
Gasoline	81mn liters/day	73mn liters/day	8mn liters/day	$880 million, despite the fact that 4000 new cars are registered each day and continued fuel smuggling with neighboring states.
Kerosene	—N/a	—N/a	2.9mn liters/day	$770 million
Furnace oil	18.1mn liters/day	11.5mn liters/day	6.4mn liters/day	$1.350 billion
Electricity	—N/a	—N/a	—N/a	~$400 million ($10 billion when including capital investment and fuel for power plants)
Water	—N/a	—N/a	—N/a	$8.1 billion
Wheat/flour	—N/a	—N/a	-22.4%	—N/a
Total:	—N/a	—N/a	—N/a	$15 billion

=== Economic and structural adjustments ===
The reforms target one of the major sources of inefficiency and price distortions in the Iranian economy, and will likely lead to major restructuring in almost all economic sectors. The banking sector in Iran is viewed as a potential hedge against the removal of subsidies, as the plan is not expected to have any direct impact on banks. Experts believe that following the launch of the subsidies reform plan, the electricity industry will undergo significant changes and will become more appealing to private investors.

On the other side, the cement industry in Iran is one of the economic sectors that will be hit the hardest in Iran following of the subsidy reform plan, because many Iranian cement factories are energy inefficient (Notwithstanding possible Ministry of Commerce adjustment and/or liberalization of commodities prices by the government during implementation). Taxi, delivery and truck drivers have also been adversely affected by the recent gas price increase. Experts believe that the removal of subsidies is likely to have an adverse impact on the profitability of the automotive sector for at least the next 2–3 years. One major element of pressure on producers is the unchanged exchange regime of the Central Bank of Iran, which puts imported products at an advantage by failing to compensate for the relative increase in production costs of domestic producers.

=== Second phase ===
During the second phase, starting in June 2012, half of the funds from energy and food subsidies will be re-allocated to the people and the remaining 50% will go to the industrial sector. If approved by the Parliament, the government will pay an extra cash handout of 280,000 rials/month to 80% of the general population (i.e. people earning less than $2000/month, which is a comfortable income level in Iran). In July 2012, it was announced that implementation of the second phase was suspended awaiting further adjustments by the government and because of raising inflation (around 22% as of April 2012). Finally, in fall 2013, the parliament approved a plan to drop 22 million Iranians—the top 30 percent of earners—from the subsidy system instead. Yet, it was reported in 2014 that out of Iran's population of 77 million, 73.6 million registered to receive the cash hand-outs.

== Effects and criticism ==
=== 2010 ===
According to earlier critics, even if half of $20 billion is passed as part of the compensation to the poorer 50% of the Iranian society, it will amount to $25 per eligible person per month; "no way near enough to make up for such inflation rates".

Critics say that if the government goes for the top of this range inflation could rise up to 40% through the economy. The International Monetary Fund, however, has predicted a more moderate rise in inflation of just 32 percent. As of January 2010, the official inflation rate stands at 15 percent. The cost of living in Iran, according to the Majlis Research Center, could rise by up to 60 percent. Ahmadinejad's administration contends that the negative side effects will be transient and that the projections are based on out-of-date models.

=== 2011 ===
According to some western reports, cash payments have been denied to some opponents of the regime during the distribution phase.

Ahmad Tavakkoli, a parliamentarian, accused the government of “violating the law” and “mis-implementing” the plan because it earned 290,000bn rials ($23.6bn) from the cut in subsidies in the first 14 months of its implementation but paid people $36.7bn of compensation in return (he says).

It has also been reported that while the subsidy reform plan needs further adaptation and fine-tuning, citizens must separate the questions of public policy from the issues of government legitimacy. The IMF has hailed Iran's economic reform and asked Iran's expertise to be transferred to other countries. The Economist Intelligence Unit has also praised Iran's subsidies reform plan for its positive effect on the economy in 2011.

=== 2012 ===
In 2012, Iran's head of the Expediency Council, Ayatollah Hashemi Rafsanjani, criticized the government for failing to reinvest the money it saved by restructuring government subsidies. To compensate, the government says it has allowed producers to adjust their prices more liberally and it has given free loans and energy subsidies in some cases. In recent years, income inequality in Iran has declined by different measures, which may be an effect of the subsidy reforms. For example, the income Gini coefficient fell from 0.4023 in 2005 to 0.3813 in 2010. Between February 2011 and February 2012, the government earned 510 trillion rials (some $41.6 billion) by implementing the Subsidy Reform Plan.

According to the World Bank:

A revision to the system of subsidies and cash transfers to better balance reimbursements and fiscal accounts has been looked upon favorably by outside analysts. Iran has made important efforts to reform its income support system away from subsidies and toward better targeted social safety nets, and this has brought down the pace of prices.

In October 2012, 179 of 240 members of parliament voted in favor of pausing the subsidy reform, because of high inflation (exacerbated by the sanctions against Iran). Consequently, the growth in consumption of subsidized products rebounded in 2012.

=== 2014 ===
In 2014, Iran started the second phase of its targeted subsidy plan under President Hassan Rohani. Petrol prices were raised by 75% from 4,000 to 7,000 rials ($0.16 to $0.28) per litre, which is far from the target price of approx. $0.90 per litre. As a consequence, fuel smuggling and gasoline imports increased again.

=== 2015 ===
Iran's government reported that the second phase of the subsidy reform plan will continue as originally planned.

=== 2016 ===
According to the sixth five-year development plan (2016-2021), the subsidy reform plan is to be extended until 2021, even though this delay in the implementation runs contrary to the Parliament's ratification of the law on subsidies reform.

In 2016, the Iranian Parliament approved subsidy cuts to 24 million Iranians. Under the changes, the government must end monthly cash payments of around $12 a person for many government employees with income above $900 per month and citizens who already receive social welfare. Nevertheless, the government is said to be reluctant to comply because this would be "unfair" despite the risk of running large budget deficits.

More recently the government has announced that it will scrap the subsidy reform plan because of "inflationary pressures" and replace it with a new plan named "energy management". The new plan aims to set new higher fuel prices (as in the original plan - consequently economize on energy consumption and increase production efficiency).

Even though cash subsidies were intended for 10% of the general population originally, they were given to 90% of the population, mostly because of lack of political will and lack of accurate data on people's income. Those cash handouts "discouraged people to work in rural areas" the government has also argued, although this claim is not supported by an Economic Research Forum study that found no evidence of labor supply reductions, but did find increases in hours worked among service sector workers, possibly due to business expansions made possible by the increased cash.

=== 2019 ===
Contrary to the subsidy reform plan's objectives, and because of the abandoning of this reform plan by the Rouhani government, the volume of Iranian subsidies given to its citizens on fossil fuel increased 42.2% year-on-year, and equals 15.3% of Iran's GDP and 16% of total global energy subsidies.

In 2018, with $69 billion of subsidies allocated for various types of energy consumption including oil ($26.6 billion), natural gas ($16.6 billion), and electricity ($26 billion), Iran holds the first place among the world's top countries in terms of the amount of subsidies allocated to energy consumption, thus furthering fuel smuggling with neighboring countries, waste, over-consumption, and air pollution.

=== 2021 ===
About nine million liters of petroleum products was smuggled out of the country every day by "mafia". In order to improve the economy, economists have suggested that it is best for the new Iranian government to return to the full and immediate implementation of the subsidy reform plan, which was left unfinished by the previous government.

== See also ==
- Subsidies in Iran
- Subsidies in India
- Economy of Iran
- Economic history of Iran
- Social Security Organization (Iran)
- Transition economy
- International rankings of Iran
- Iran and WTO
- Tehran Stock Exchange
- Reform and opening up
