= Iran and Libya Sanctions Act =

1996 act of the United States Congress

Iran and Libya Sanctions Act of 1996
- Long title: An Act to impose sanctions on persons making certain investments directly and significantly contributing to the enhancement of the ability of Iran or Libya to develop its petroleum resources, and on persons exporting certain items that enhance Libya's weapons or aviation capabilities or enhance Libya's ability to develop its petroleum resources, and for other purposes.
- Acronyms (colloquial): ILSA, IOSA
- Nicknames: Iran Oil Sanctions Act of 1996
- Enacted by: the 104th United States Congress
- Effective: August 5, 1996

Citations
- Public law: 104-172
- Statutes at Large: 110 Stat. 1541

Codification
- Titles amended: 50 U.S.C.: War and National Defense
- U.S.C. sections amended: 50 U.S.C. ch. 35 § 1701 et seq.

Legislative history
- Introduced in the House as H.R. 3107 by Benjamin Gilman (R–NY) on March 19, 1996; Committee consideration by House International Relations, House Banking and Financial Services, House Ways and Means, House Government Reform and Oversight; Passed the House on June 19, 1996 (415–0, Roll call vote 250, via Clerk.House.gov); Passed the Senate on July 16, 1996 (passed unanimous consent) with amendment; House agreed to Senate amendment on July 23, 1996 (agreed without objection); Signed into law by President Bill Clinton on August 5, 1996

The Iran and Libya Sanctions Act of 1996 (ILSA) was a 1996 act of the United States Congress that imposed economic sanctions on firms doing business with Iran and Libya. On September 20, 2004, the President signed an executive order to terminate the national emergency with respect to Libya and to end IEEPA-based economic sanctions on Libya. On September 30, 2006, the Act was renamed the Iran Sanctions Act (ISA). The Act was originally limited to five years, and has been extended several times. On September 18, 2026, the ISA was extended to 2031.

The Act empowers the President to waive sanctions on a case-by-case basis, which is subject to renewal every six months. As of March 2008, ISA sanctions had not been enforced against any non-US company. Despite the restrictions on American investment in Iran, FIPPA provisions apply to all foreign investors, and many Iranian expatriates based in the US continue to make substantial investments in Iran.

== Background ==
In 1995, in response to the Iranian nuclear program and Iranian support for Hezbollah, Hamas, and Palestine Islamic Jihad, that are considered terrorist organizations by the US, President Bill Clinton had issued several executive orders with respect to Iran, including Executive Order 12957 of March 15, 1995, banning U.S. investment in Iran's energy sector, and Executive Order 12959 of May 6, 1995, which banned U.S. trade with and investment in Iran.

== Provisions ==
The Act targets both U.S. and non-U.S. business making certain investments in Iran. Under ISA, unless exempted by the president, all foreign companies that provide investments over $20 million for the development of petroleum resources in Iran will be imposed two out of seven possible sanctions, by the U.S.:

- denial of Export-Import Bank of the United States assistance
- denial of export licenses for exports to the violating company
- prohibition on loans or credits from U.S. financial institutions of over $10 million in any 12-month period
- prohibition on designation as a primary dealer for U.S. government debt instruments
- prohibition on serving as an agent of the United States or as a repository for U.S. government funds
- denial of U.S. government procurement opportunities (consistent with World Trade Organization obligations), and
- a ban on all or some imports of the violating company.

== Renewal and expiration ==
ILSA included a five-year sunset clause and was to expire on August 5, 2001. In the debate in the U.S. Congress on whether ILSA should expire, some legislators argued sanctions hindered bilateral relations, and others argued they would be seen as a concession on an effective program. ILSA was renewed by the Congress and signed by President George W. Bush. ILSA was renewed for another five years, until August 2006.

In 2005, the Iran Freedom Support bill was introduced in both houses to extend the provisions of ILSA indefinitely and to impose a time limit for the administration to determine whether an investment violates ILSA. The House of Representatives legislation, H.R. 282 was introduced on January 6, 2005, was reported by committee on March 15, 2006, and passed the House on April 26, 2006, by a vote of 397–21, with 14 not voting. The companion Senate legislation, S. 333 was introduced on February 9, 2005, was referred to the Foreign Relations Committee. The bill was not reported by the committee and died.

On July 25, 2006, bill H.R. 5877, to extend ILSA until September 29, 2006, was introduced in the House, and passed the next day by voice vote. It was passed by the Senate by unanimous consent on July 31, and was signed into law by President George W. Bush on August 4, 2006.

On September 30, 2006, ILSA was renamed the Iran Sanctions Act (ISA), as it no longer applied to Libya, and extended until December 31, 2011. The Iran Freedom and Support Act passed on the same day on September 30, 2006. The Comprehensive Iran Sanctions, Accountability, and Divestment Act of 2010 amended the Iran Sanctions Act to expand the president's ability to punish companies aiding Iran's petroleum sector.

On December 1, 2016, ISA was extended for a further ten years.

On September 18, 2026, the ISA was extended for another five years, to 2031.

== See also ==
- United States sanctions against Iran
- Sanctions against Iran
- Blocking statute
