= Qiran =

Qiran may refer to:

- Iranian qiran, a currency of Iran between 1825 and 1932
- Qiran, Saudi Arabia, a village in Al Madinah Province
