= Iranian energy crisis =

Despite being a country with huge oil and gas reserves Iran suffers from a severe energy crisis. The Iranian energy crisis is a multifaceted problem that has been exacerbated by a combination of factors, including poor governance, international sanctions, and the dominance of industries under the Islamic Revolutionary Guard Corps (IRGC). As of November 2024 Iran faces its most severe energy crisis in decades, with frequent power outages and disruptions to natural gas supplies. The country's energy infrastructure is outdated and in disrepair, with many refineries and power plants operating below capacity. Iran's energy supply is unreliable, with frequent blackouts and shortages affecting daily life, industries, and essential services. The IRGC's control over key industries, including power generation and distribution, has hindered efficient management and strategic planning. The government's prioritization of political interests over efficient management and infrastructural development has exacerbated the crisis. A notable example is the extensive usage that the IRGC makes of electricity to mine cryptocurrency which "leaves Iran in the dark.

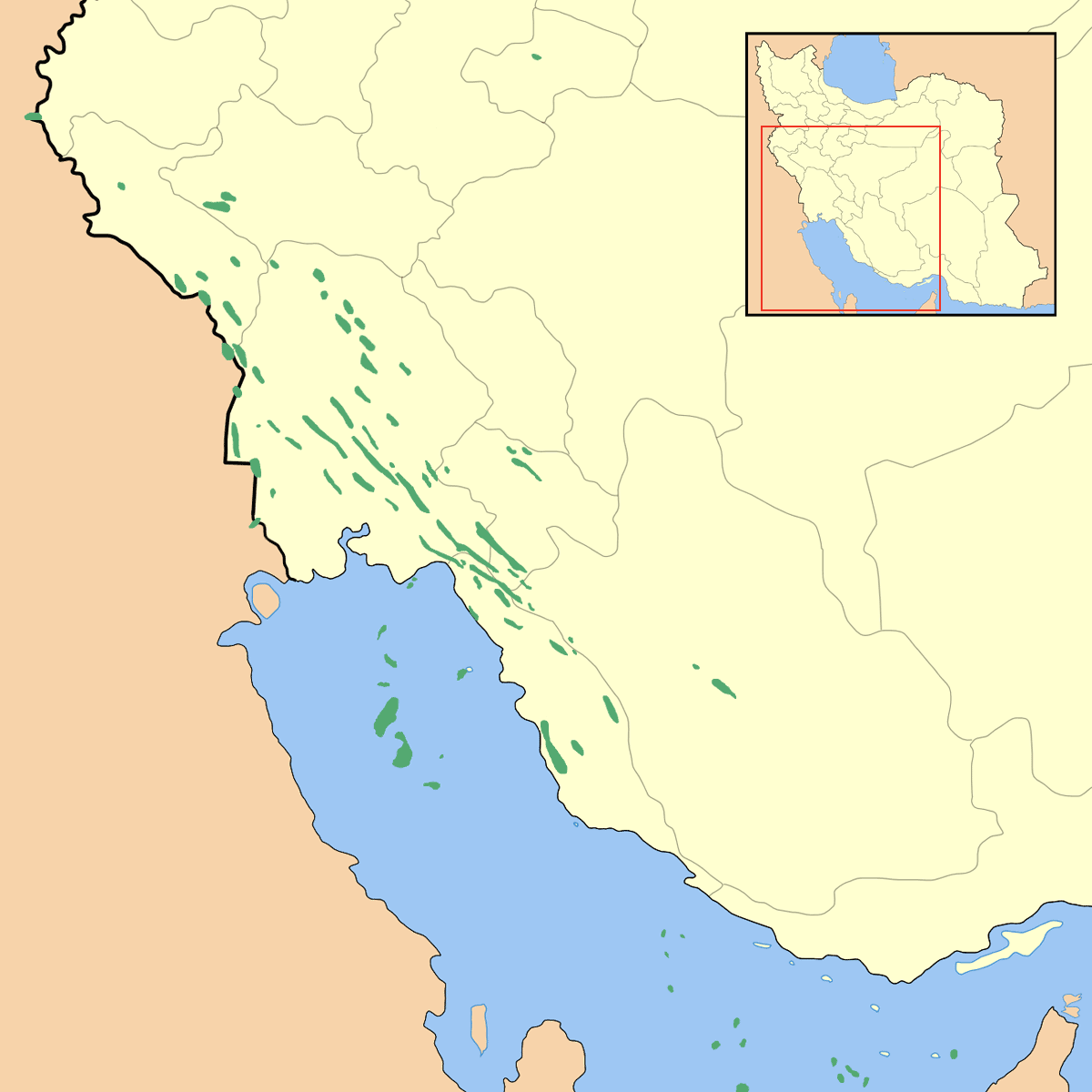
A map of Iranian oilfields

Despite ongoing power shortages, Iran continues to export electricity, with a surge of nearly 92% in the first four months of 2023 compared to the same period in 2022.

The crisis has put stop to 50% of industry.

In January and February 2025 constant global shutdowns were conducted with the schools as well as Iranian industries.

Since February 2025, Iran has been suffering from daily blackouts, each lasting for 3-4 hours.

The energy shortage does not equally affect all segments of the population. For example, in Tehran, northern neighbourhoods have been experiencing only 1% of outages while poorer southern districts endured 32%.

The dual crises conditions have led to dire food shortages and 2025 Iranian protests and mass transportations sector labor strikes.

In December 2025 Iran introduced imported water from northern neighboring countries and Afghanistan. It also established Strategic Energy Management Agency Organization. Ayatollah Ali Khamenei ordered people reducing consumption of food, bread, water, energy and fuel.

== 2026 Iran war ==
In May 2026 Iranian regime reported that they will introduce rolling blackouts. Blackouts were rolled out in July as well with threat advisory.

== 2025 Post-war ==
By November 80% of wetlands were reported to have dried up. Masoud Pezeshkian urged Iranian capital relocation. The government signed a plan with Russia to build 4 nuclear power plants for deal worth $25 billion. As of November 2025 Tehran faced water shortage. In his speech Khamenei said people must go to God for rain. The government raised gas prices to 5000. Government also constantly shutdown schools, banks and public offices nationally due to air pollution from mazut.

== Power shortages ==
In the winter of 2024 Iran experienced its most severe energy crisis in decades, with frequent power outages and disruptions to natural gas supplies. The authorities announced widespread closures of schools, universities, and government offices, and shopping centers in the capital Tehran and 17 Iranian provinces to save energy. Numerous highways and streets experienced blackouts, including a 24-hour power outage on the critical Haraz road, which connects Tehran to northern cities. Many schools switched to remote learning, while others remain closed across several provinces. In the summer of 2024, Iran's electricity shortage was estimated at around 14,000 megawatts, equivalent to twice the total electricity production of Azerbaijan. Previous estimates by the Ministry of Energy and the Majlis Research Center indicated that Iran needed to add 5,000 megawatts (7%) to its electricity production annually to avoid shortages. However, official statistics show that this target was not met in recent years. In total, the energy imbalance in 2024 was about 300 million cubic meters a day.

Iran's energy supply is unreliable, with frequent blackouts and shortages affecting daily life, industries, and essential services.

== Energy imbalance ==
Iran has faced a decade-long imbalance in its energy market. Electricity consumption has been increasing by 4% year since 2010, reaching 292 TWh (Terawatt hours) in 2022. The residential sector represents 33% of electricity consumption, followed by industry (33%) and services (18%) sectors. The remainder (16%) is consumed in the oil and gas industries.

Per capita energy consumption stands at 3.2 TOE (Tons of Oil Equivalent - this measure represents the quantity of energy contained in a ton of crude oil). The per capita consumption of energy in Iran is similar to the Middle East or the EU averages.

Since 2016, natural gas has accounted for about 70% of total energy consumption, with its share steadily increasing by 10 percentage points since 2010. In contrast, the share of oil in total consumption has decreased by nearly 10 percentage points, reaching 30% in 2022. Primary electricity, mainly from hydro sources, represents a marginal share of 1%.

Each year, Iran supplies 70 bcm of gas to power plants, nearly 1.5 times Turkey's total gas consumption. In summer 2024, Iran experienced a 14,000-megawatt electricity shortage. Despite a nominal capacity of over 92 GW, many of Iran’s power plants are outdated, with significant portions of steam and gas plants exceeding 30 years in age. The reason for the underinvestment is the economic sanctions on Iran and government restrictions. The Ministry of Energy, the sole buyer of electricity, has limited private sector incentives by preventing the formation of energy market, thus creating a growing government debt to private plant owners has further hindered investment. By early 2024, the government’s debt to private power plant owners had surpassed $2 billion. Iran’s financial strain is worsened by $30 billion in electricity subsidies and $52 billion for petroleum products in 2023 which causes an increase in the consumption. Moreover, 13% of electricity is lost in the outdated transmission and distribution network, costing the country $4-5 billion annually.

This results in frequent power outages during peak summer and a daily gas deficit of 250 million cubic meters in winter, costing industries at least $8 billion annually.

== Gas imbalance ==
Iran is the world's fourth-largest gas consumer, consuming more gas than 30 European countries combined. The country produces around 260 billion cubic meters (bcm) of natural gas annually, with 18 bcm allocated for export and the rest consumed domestically. Iran's gas demand has grown significantly, from 153 bcm in 2013 to 245 bcm in 2023, driven primarily by the residential sector, vehicles, and power plants.

Iran's gas infrastructure is inefficient, with significant losses due to flaring, leaks, and low productivity. The country flares 18 bcm of gas annually due to inadequate collection equipment, and 7 bcm is lost in the transmission and distribution network each year. Furthermore, Iran's thermal power plants operate at just 33% efficiency, and 13% of electricity is lost during transmission.

Economic sanctions over the past two decades have hindered foreign investment in Iran’s energy sector, limiting the development of gas production capacity and power plants. Despite having substantial gas reserves in joint fields, many remain undeveloped due to lack of investment. The stalled development of the South Pars gas field has worsened the imbalance, and Iran's oil minister warned in 2022 that without $240 billion in investment, Iran could become a net energy importer.

While neighboring countries like Turkey diversify their energy mix by balancing coal, natural gas, oil, and renewables, Iran remains heavily reliant on natural gas.

== Cryptocurrency mining ==
The cryptocurrency market in Iran is flourishing. Bitcoin mining is highly energy-intensive, requiring substantial electrical resources. Iran's power grid is both fragile and costly to maintain, with frequent outages and a loss of about 13% of electricity during transmission. Iran's pursuit of expanding cryptocurrency mining farms, particularly for Bitcoin, which began to bypass the imposed international sanction has diverted significant amounts of electricity (approximately 600 megawatts) away from the public grid.

== Corruption and mismanagement ==
Iran, heavily reliant on petroleum revenues, has some of the largest reserves of oil and natural gas in the world, but it struggles with energy shortages due to poor planning, outdated infrastructure, and the impact of international sanctions. Despite these challenges, Iran's government has failed to modernize its electricity sector, leading to frequent power outages and energy crises throughout the year. One of the main issues exacerbating Iran’s energy shortages is the rampant smuggling of fuel. The government claims to have increased fuel exports. Iran’s subsidized fuel, which is much cheaper than in neighboring countries, makes it highly attractive to smugglers. As a result, large quantities of gasoline and diesel are illicitly exported, leaving the domestic market with insufficient supplies. Lawmaker Malek Shariati revealed that around 1.5 billion liters of liquid fuel are smuggled from power plants each year, with smuggling activities often involving forged documents and low fines that make such crimes profitable.

The privatization of key power plants in recent years has also contributed to the deterioration of Iran’s energy sector. Faced with budget constraints, the government transferred many power plants to private, often politically connected, investors. However, these new owners have failed to invest in necessary upgrades or maintenance, allowing the plants to fall into disrepair. For example, power plants such as the Abadan and Zagros plants were handed over to powerful organizations like Setad and the Foundation of Martyrs and Veterans Affairs at highly discounted prices, enriching regime insiders while doing little to address the country’s energy needs.

A further complication arises from a controversial new privatization plan in the latest budget, which allows military and state-connected entities, such as the General Staff of the Armed Forces, to sell oil and retain the profits. This practice, used in the past for illicit oil exports during sanctions, has raised alarms about ongoing corruption within Iran. A notable case of such corruption occurred in 2013 when businessman Babak Zanjani was arrested for embezzling $2.7 billion through illegal oil sales.

== 2024–2025 crisis ==
=== Winter 2024-2025: Energy shortage ===
In November 2024, after demand for electricity during the summer caused frequent blackouts, a severe gas shortage caused the government to prepare to impose more blackouts on the population during the winter. By December 2024, Iranian government offices were operating only partially or were closed entirely, schools and colleges transitioned to online learning only, power to shopping malls and highways were was cut off and due to reduced power supply industry almost halted. The result of the power shortage was shutdowns in 23 Iranian provinces.

In mid-December 2024, Iran faced a severe energy crisis as a cold snap led to natural gas shortages and nationwide electricity blackouts. The government ordered the shutdown of schools, offices, banks, and businesses across major provinces (including Tehran) to conserve energy amid subzero temperatures. Energy Minister Abbas Aliabadi reported that 13 power plants had gone offline due to a lack of fuel, warning that the electricity supply would remain constrained until more gas or diesel could be delivered. Unannounced power outages hit millions of homes for hours at a time, and even industrial sectors faced massive power cuts. In some cases, authorities imposed rolling blackouts rather than burning additional low-quality fuel oil (mazut), which would worsen pollution. Despite these efforts, air quality deteriorated sharply in cities like Tehran and Arak, as many plants resorted to burning mazut. A local lawmaker in Arak angrily described the renewed mazut burning as “an order to kill people” due to its lethal pollution. President Masoud Pezeshkian issued a public apology for the fuel shortages and appealed to citizens to help by lowering their thermostats by 2 °C to reduce gas consumption. Officials noted that a 3–4 °C drop in temperature could raise nationwide gas use by about 25 million cubic meters per day.

The crisis persisted into January 2025. On 10 January, authorities again ordered schools and government offices closed in roughly one-third of the country’s provinces as several power plants remained shut for lack of fuel. Despite Iran’s enormous oil and gas reserves, sanctions and underinvestment have left its refineries and power stations unable to meet peak winter demand. The government cited the need to manage electricity consumption during a deep freeze, as temperatures in northern Iran fell to –20 °C. Iran’s energy shortages were also exacerbated by alleged sabotage: Reports claimed that a February 2024 attack on a major gas pipeline (attributed to Israel) forced Iran to draw heavily on emergency gas reserves, leaving supplies dangerously depleted ahead of winter. By late January, intermittent blackouts and gas cuts were still commonplace, though officials briefly paused some blackouts during the ten-day anniversary of the 1979 Revolution to avoid public anger.

=== Escalation: February 2025 ===
A new cold wave in early February 2025 triggered further energy shortfalls. The government preemptively closed offices and switched schools to online learning on multiple days to “preserve energy stability” amid the frigid weather. Widespread blackouts resumed once the Revolution anniversary events concluded, sparking frustration as many suspected the outages had been deliberately timed around political dates. On 24–25 February, Iran announced full or partial shutdowns in at least 25–27 provinces (out of 31) due to acute shortages of both electricity and natural gas. Even Tehran was effectively shut for consecutive days, with government services, banks, and schools closed as heating gas pressure fell and power plants lacked fuel. IRGC-affiliated Tasnim News Agency noted that by early January, at least 80 of the country’s 600 power stations had halted operations due to fuel scarcity, cutting national generation capacity by about 8,000 MW (14%) (irannewsupdate.com). To keep lights on, many power plants burned diesel fuel instead of gas, adding to urban smog and prompting health warnings. In the capital and other cities, streetlights and highway lights were turned off at night to conserve power, plunging areas into darkness. The repeated closures of workplaces and schools further disrupted daily life. By late February, public institutions had been closed for roughly 11-12 days within a single month, a situation one Iranian newspaper described as unparalleled. According to Tasnim, each day of nationwide school closure costs the economy an estimated 10,000 billion rials and severely sets back students’ learning. The head of Iran’s Statistics Center acknowledged inflation was running above 30% in early 2025, and the energy crisis compounded the broader economic malaise.

=== After February 2025 ===
From February 2025 onward, over 70% of provinces reported recurring outages, ranging from unannounced blackouts to structured electricity rationing in major cities. On 5 May 2025, authorities in Tehran officially implemented a rolling blackout schedule for residential districts in response to rising demand and generation deficits

The industrial sector has been one of the hardest hit by post-February blackouts. In Fars Province, repeated electricity and gas interruptions have forced many workshops to shut down or cut shifts, raising concerns about unemployment. The Aria Steel Factory in Ardestan, for instance, reduced operations to just 20% of capacity, laying off at least 40 workers due to energy constraints. Nationwide, manufacturers reported operating at only 50% of normal capacity, with total losses across industrial sectors estimated at up to US$20 billion. The steel and cement industries were especially affected due to their reliance on continuous energy supplies.

President Pezeshkian and other officials began to speak openly of the government’s embarrassment. In a late February speech, Pezeshkian admitted “we let the people down” with the winter blackouts and gas cuts, saying his administration was “ashamed” that it had to ration power for both households and industry. He called the winter’s outcome “unacceptable” and vowed to “strive to move out of this situation next year” . Critics, including some in Iran’s parliament, charged that the rolling shutdowns were merely “covering up the problem” instead of addressing root causes. On social media, many Iranians described the widespread energy closures and factory stoppages as signs of “bankruptcy” or “collapse” of governance. Notably, U.S. President Donald Trump even reposted news about Iran’s power shortages with the comment, “This is how regimes fall”.

In August 2025 Iran has announced sweeping closures across multiple provinces including the capital due to soaring temperatures amid severe electricity and water shortages.

== Gasoline crisis ==
As of August 2026, Iran suffers from gasoline crisis, which is felt even in the oil rich southern cities of Iran. To tackle the crisis Iran cut the subsidized gasoline quota from 70 liters to 50 liters and weighs gasoline rationing. On July 25, government spokesperson Fatemeh Mohajerani said changes to fuel prices or rationing are unavoidable. Esmael Saghab Esfahani the Iranian vice president and the head of the Energy Optimization Organization in Iran said gasoline consumption had reached 135 million liters a day, while the refineries produce 112 million. The gap is covered by imports and strategic reserves. The gasoline shortage is said to cripple the banking sector and accelerating inflation and financial fragility. Reports suggest that the regime is trapped between enforcing unbearable economic pressure on an already impoverished population and the danger of sparking another nationwide uprising.

The eurasia review reported on August 19, 2026 that the Iranian government is weighing three options to tackle the crisis: shutting stations after quotas, dual pricing, or individual rationing. They also report that the government refuses to implement simplest solution, cutting fuel to the IRGC, Basij and other security forces. Consequently, the government is trapped between economic collapse and political explosion. The refusal to solve the crisis already results in gas stations shutdowns in some parts of Tehran as they ran out of gasoline.

According to Iranian officials, part of the shortage is caused by smuggling. According the officials around 20 million liters of fuel are smuggled out of the country every day, costing Iran between $4 billion and $5.2 billion a year.

Iran declared that starting from September 8th 2026, gasoline prices will double.

== See also ==
- 2025–2026 Iran internal crisis
- 2025–2026 Iranian protests
