= Crypto Rial =

Iranian cryptocurrency

The Crypto Rial (In Persian language: رمز ریال), also called National Crypto Rial, National Crypto Currency, or National Digital Currency is a type of cryptocurrency announced by officials of the Central Bank of the Islamic Republic of Iran, which is based on the Iranian rial. It was unveiled in 2022 and intended to replace banknotes.

== History ==
In early autumn 2021, Iranian officials proposed launching a national crypto currency based on the rial. The governor of the Central Bank announced that the national crypto currency is an important item on the agenda, with infrastructure and regulations developed, and will be launched experimentally soon.

In recent years, attention of investors and the public has turned to cryptocurrencies as a way to preserve value and invest.

== Structure ==
Upon issuing the Crypto Rial, individuals exchange their rial banknotes with the central bank for crypto rial. This crypto rial is not intended for investment but merely a replacement for physical banknotes.

The central bank's goal in designing the Crypto Rial is to convert cash into a programmable and smart entity.

The Deputy of Technology at the Central Bank explains that the Crypto Rial is stored inside mobile devices, with the bank acting as an intermediary for transferring funds. The main objective is to remove physical cash from people's pockets and transfer it into a digital system.

One important feature of the Crypto Rial compared to banknotes is its high security level. Unlike common cryptocurrencies such as Bitcoin, the design of the Crypto Rial allows precise tracking of funds. Even in cases of theft or hacking of mobile phones, tracking is possible.

The Central Bank launched the Crypto Rial officially in 2022.

== Criticism ==
The crypto rial already exists in Iranian bank cards.

Its traceability challenges key features of global cryptocurrencies and is seen as a downside compared to cryptocurrencies like Bitcoin, undermining the original concept.

== See also ==
- Cryptocurrencies in Iran
- Central Bank Digital Currency
- Bitcoin
- Bitcoin Cash
- Cryptocurrency
- Electronic money
