= Security Printing and Minting Organization =

Iranian mint, subsidiary of the Central Bank of Iran

- Formerly: Royal Persian Mint
- Company type: State-owned enterprise
- Industry: Minting; Security printing
- Predecessor: 24 provincial mints
- Founded: June 14, 1877; 149 years ago
- Founder: Mohammad-Hasan Aminolzarb
- Headquarters: 191, Pasdaran Ave., Tehran
- Area served: Iran
- Key people: Amir Shokri (Director)
- Products: Bahar Azadi Coin; Commemorative coins; Rial circulation coins, banknotes and cash cheques
- Production output: 800 million banknotes (2015–16)
- Parent: Central Bank of Iran (Since September 23, 1962; 63 years ago); Ministry of Finance (1877–1962)
- Website: spmo.ir

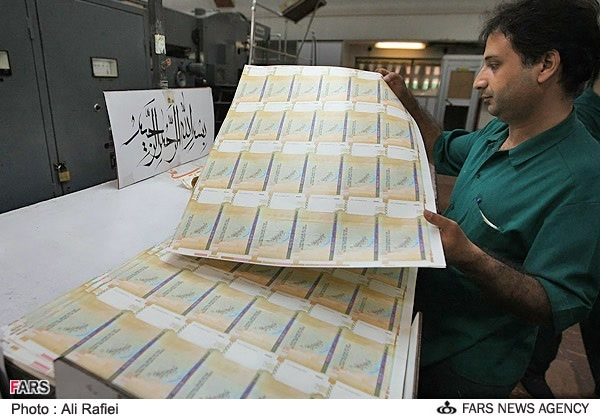
Iran's state banknote printing facility photographed by Fars News Agency

Security Printing and Minting Organization (SPMO; Persian: سازمان تولید اسکناس و مسکوک, romanized: sāzmān-e towlid-e eskenās va maskuk, lit. 'Bills and Coins Production Organization') is a subsidiary of the Central Bank of Iran responsible for design, production and elimination of banknotes and coinage in Iran under the exclusive authority.

== History ==
Founded in 1877 as the sole national mint zarab-khane (zarrabḵana) of Iran, it replaced multiple provincial mints. It was constructed at the place of a former cotton factory in northern Tehran, and used French machinery while the original building was built by the Belgians. Senior Münze Österreich official, Franz Pechan von Prägenberg, contributed to technically operate the mint. In 1931, Germans provided the mint with new machinery.

Iranian banknotes were not printed by the organization until 1982; instead they were outsourced abroad to Bradbury Wilkinson and Company, Waterlow and Sons, American Bank Notes Co and De La Rue. Koenig & Bauer reportedly refused to provide the organization with equipment in 2012.
