= Aghazadeh Mansion =

Qajar-era house in Iran

- خانه آقازاده
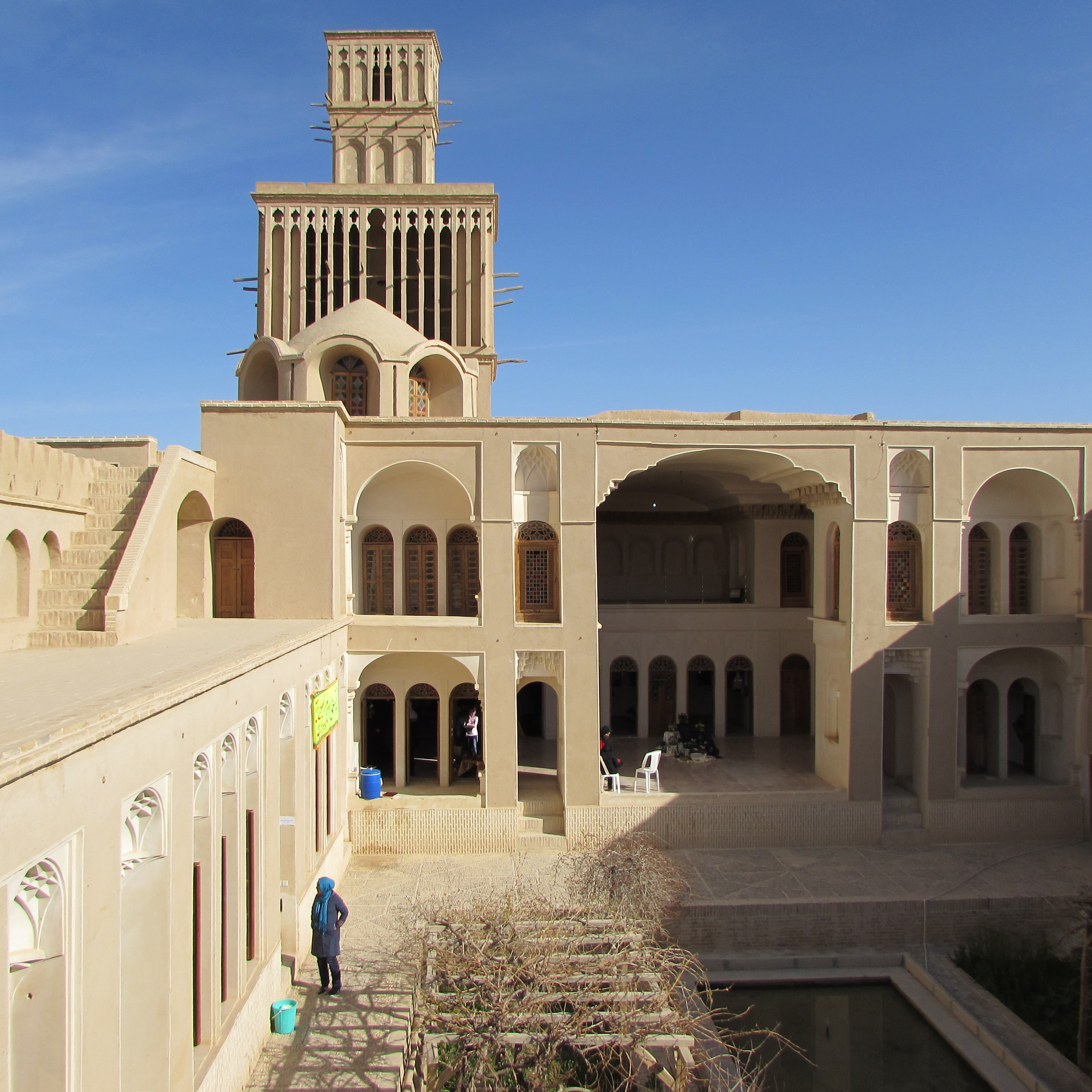
- Aghazadeh Mansion
- Interactive map of the Aghazadeh Mansion area

General information
- Status: Completed
- Type: Mansion
- Architectural style: Qajar
- Location: Bahonar Street, Abarkooh, Yazd Province, Iran
- Coordinates: 31°7′34″N 53°17′19″E
- Client: Seyed Hasan Abarquei

Technical details
- Material: Adobe; bricks; clay; stone
- Floor count: Two
- Floor area: 851 m^{2} (9,160 sq ft)

Iran National Heritage List
- Official name: Aghazadeh Mansion
- Type: Built
- Designated: 12 February 1997
- Reference no.: 1838
- Conservation organization: Cultural Heritage, Handicrafts and Tourism Organization of Iran

The Aghazadeh Mansion (Persian: خانه آقازاده (ابرکوه)) is a mansion with a windcatcher (badgir), located in Abarkooh, in the province of Yazd, Iran.

The mansion was built during the Qajar era, and added to the Iran National Heritage List on 12 February 1997, administered by the Cultural Heritage, Handicrafts and Tourism Organization of Iran. Since 2015, the façade of the mansion was portrayed on the 20,000 rial bill.

== Architecture ==
The mansion was designed in the Qajar style, with a cross-shaped southern room that faces a central courtyard with a large stone pond located in the middle of the courtyard. The pergola of the mansion was decorated by muqarnas and decorated with beautiful stuccos. The mansion contains a rare type of dome, called Kolah Farangi, that complements the aesthetics of the home and its badgir. It also serves as an inlet for natural light to come into the home and make it look brighter. Its open arcades feature wooden stained glass windows that can be opened or closed.

The mansion's windcatcher is regarded as one of the finest in the world. The main windcatcher is 18 metres (59 ft) high and covers an area of 18 square metres (190 sq ft). There are 19 air-adjusting vents in the windcatcher, which are internally connected to a second windcatcher. This windcatcher can do the air-adjustment even if there is no wind blowing. Unlike most windcatchers, this one is a two-storey structure. The mansion has three different sections, enabling residents to live in different parts of the house based on the weather conditions in various seasons.

== Gallery ==
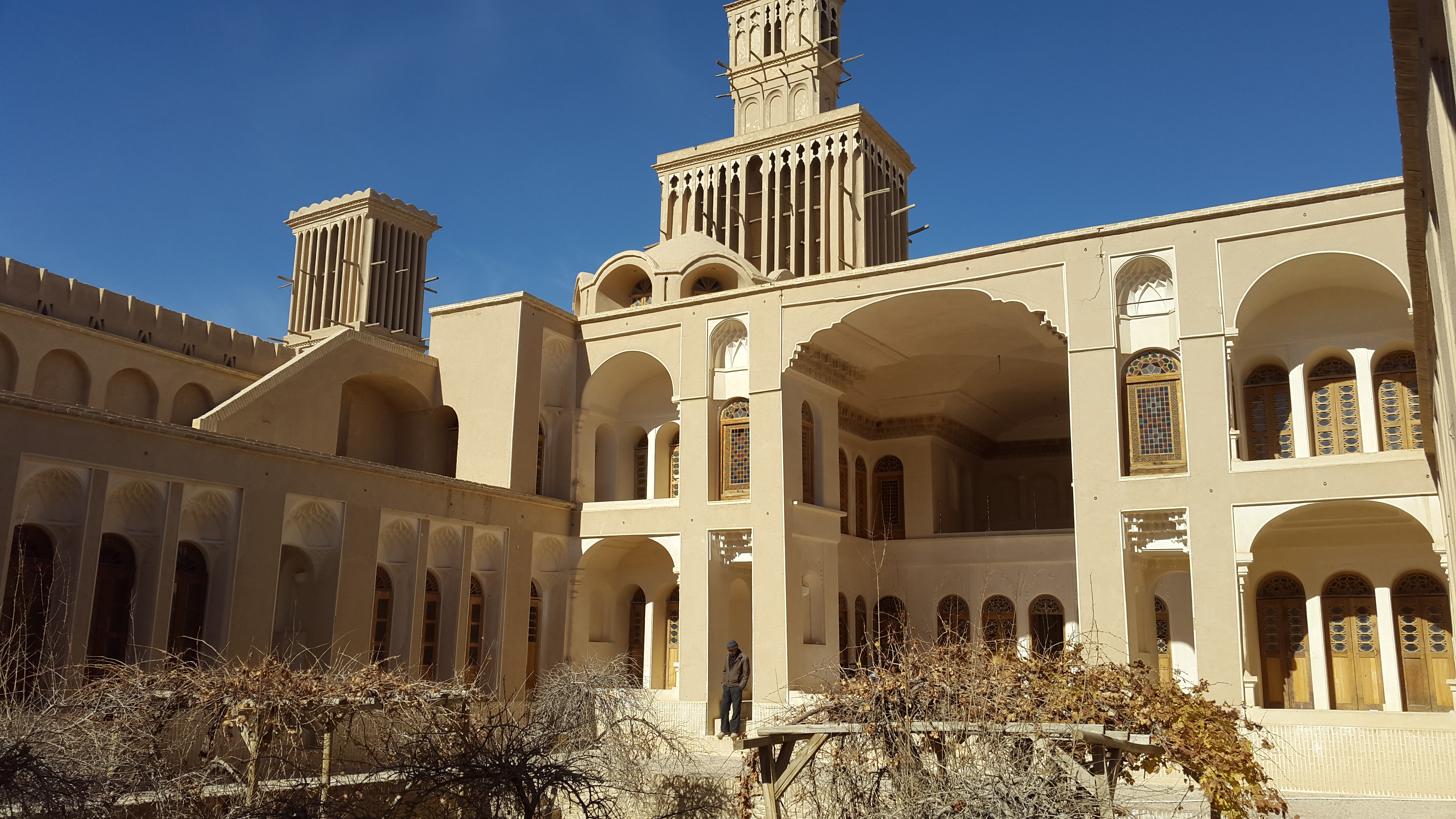
Exterior, both windcatchers and the main foyer

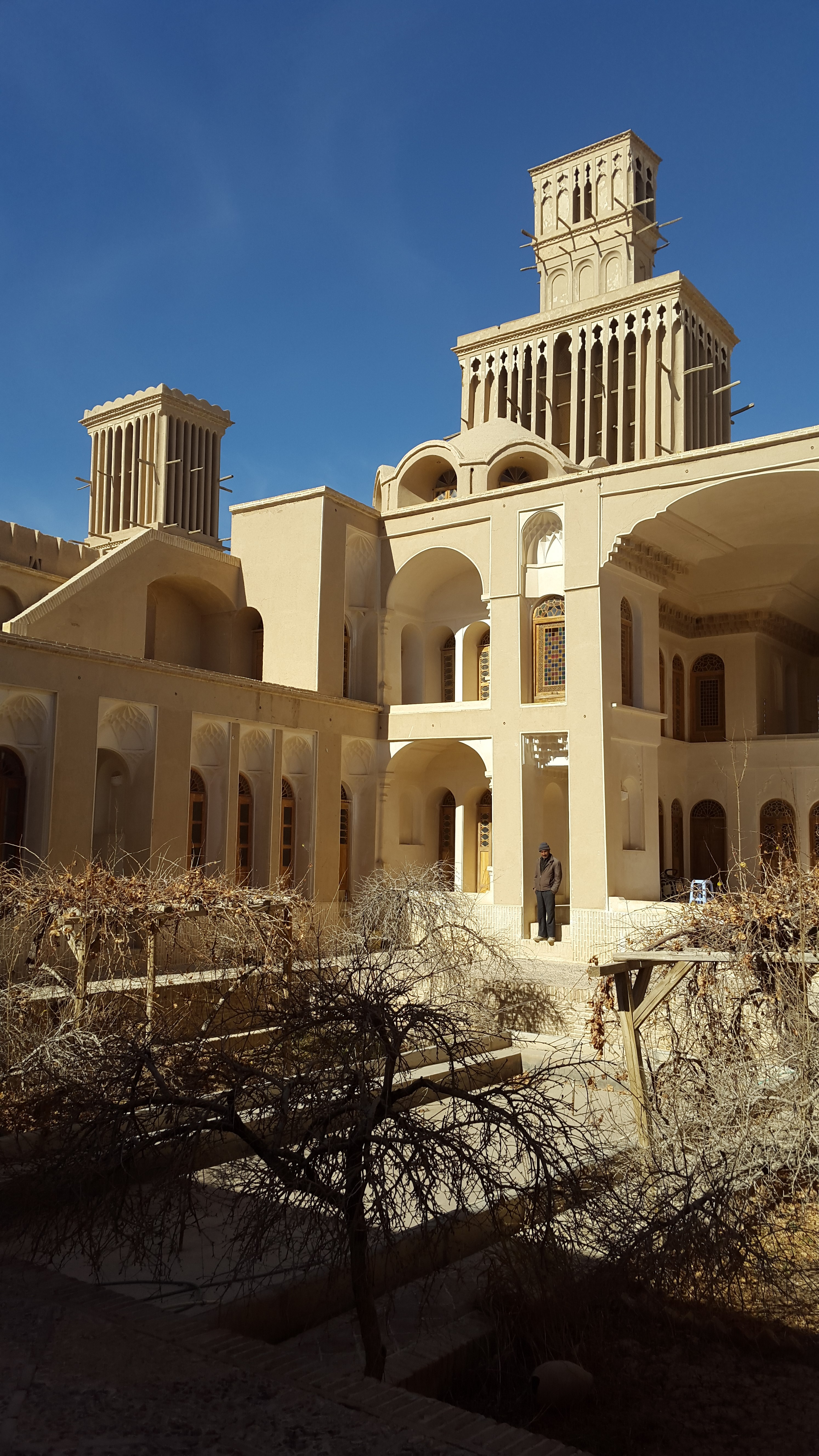
The windcatchers

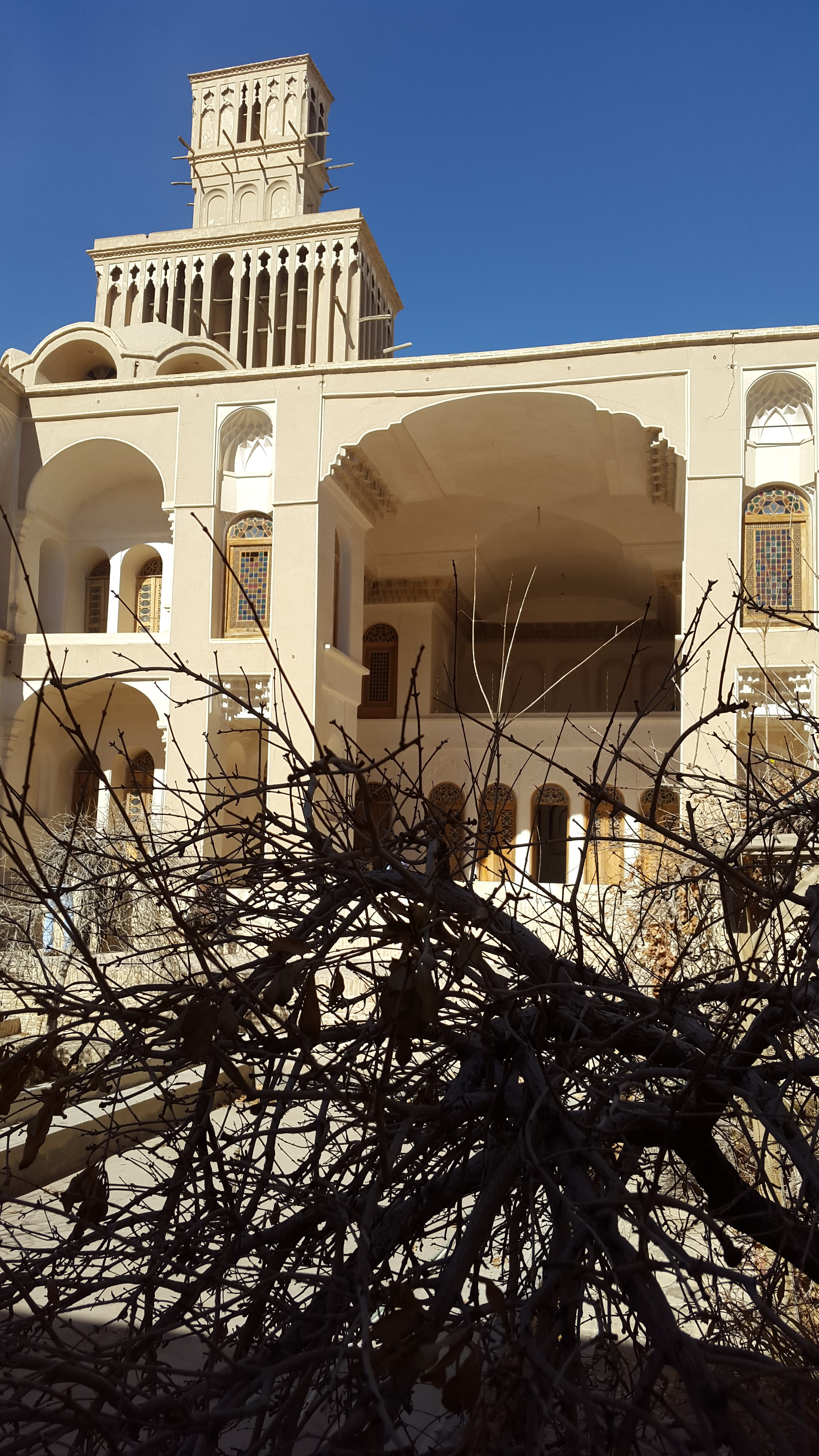
The main windcatchers and foyer

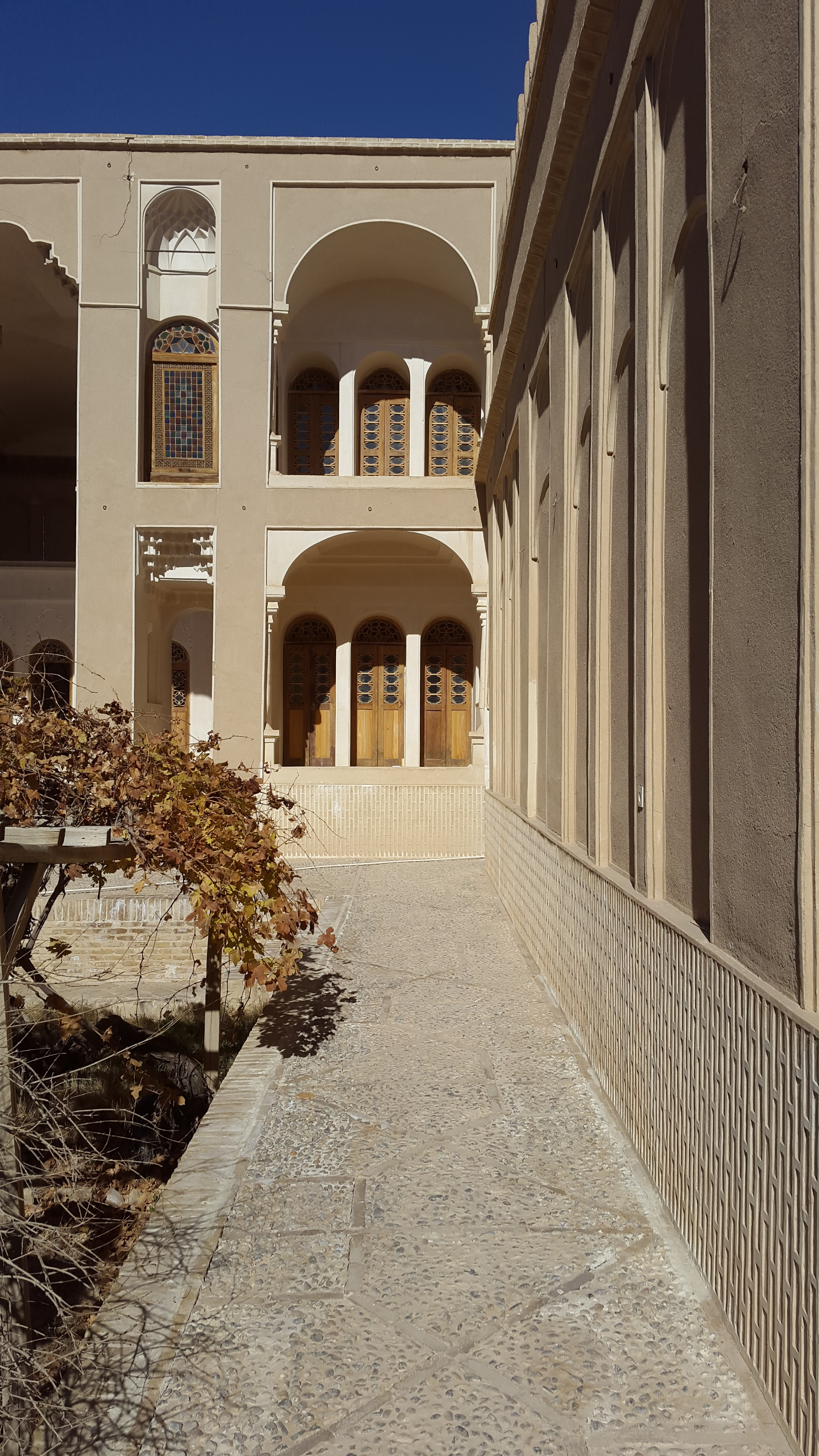
Balconies

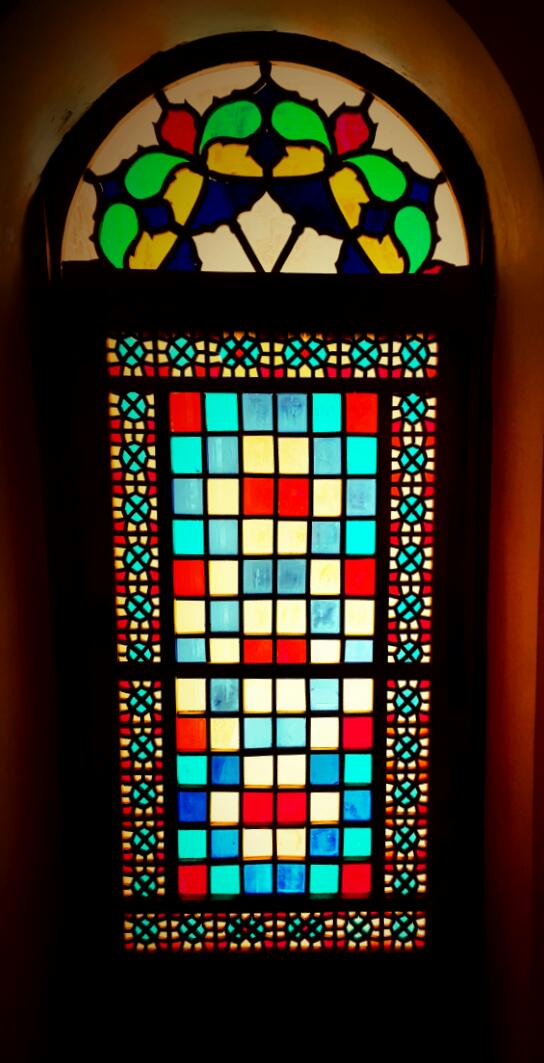
Stained glass window

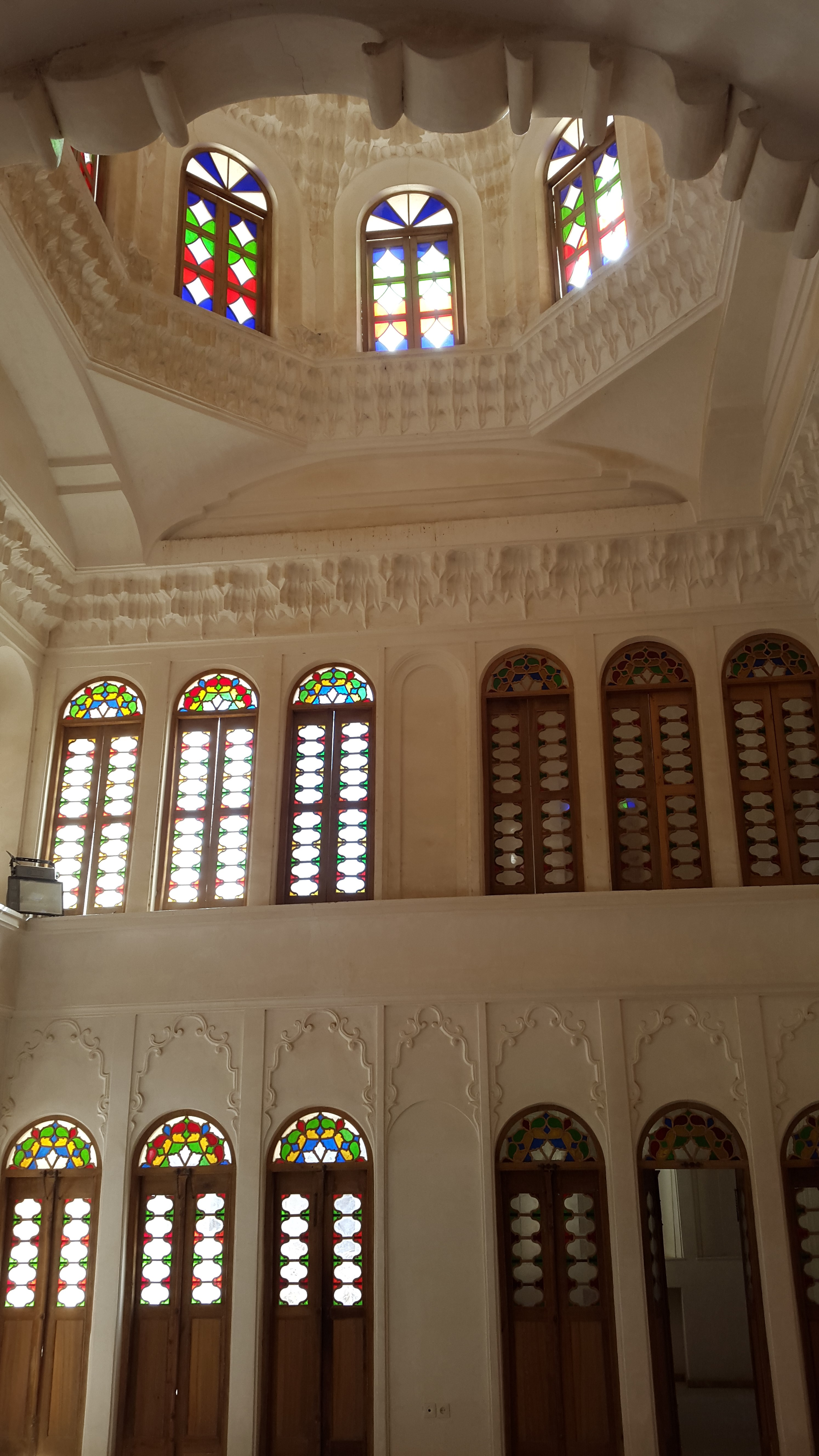
Interior of the main chamber

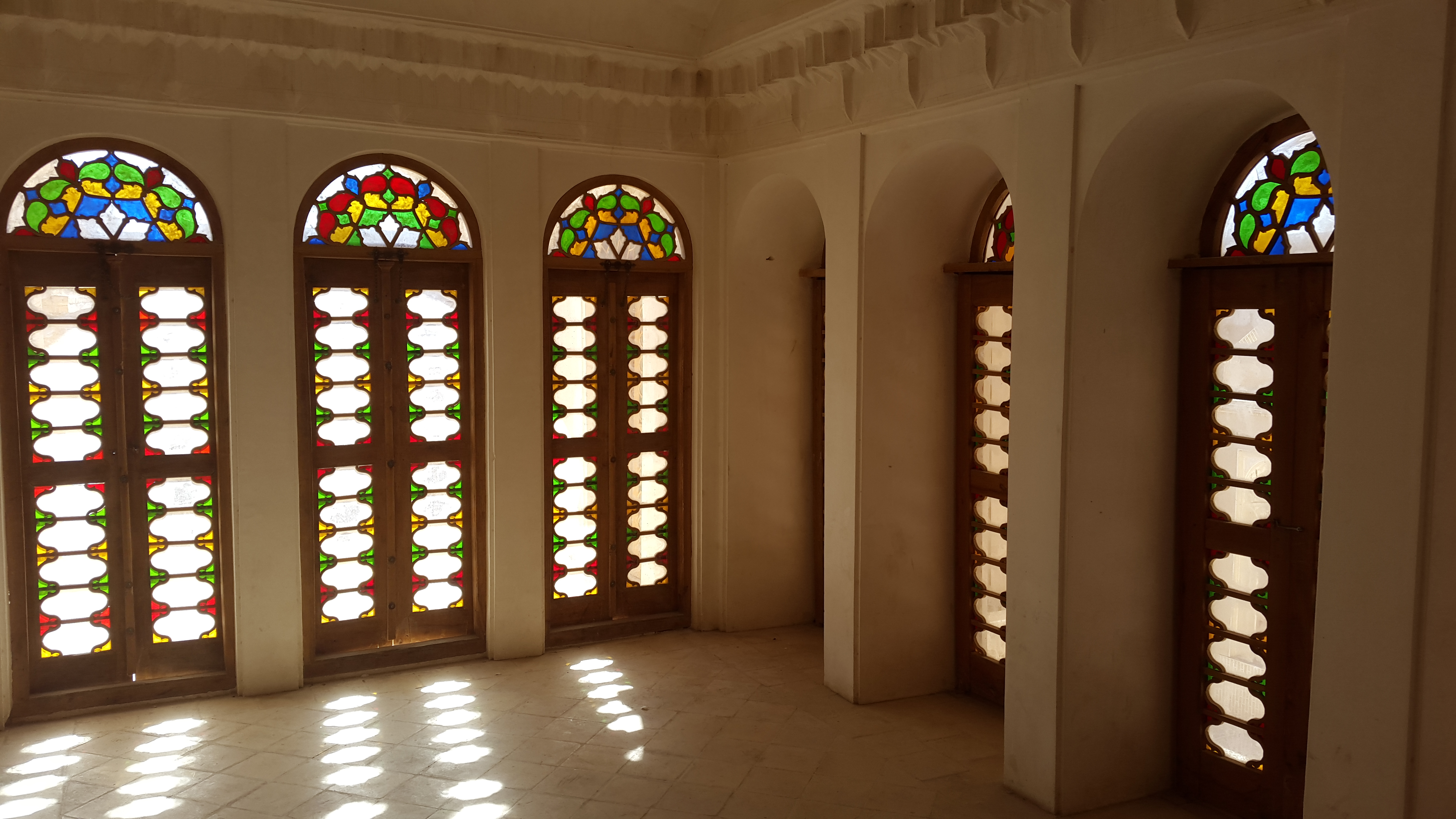
Interior of the main second-floor chamber

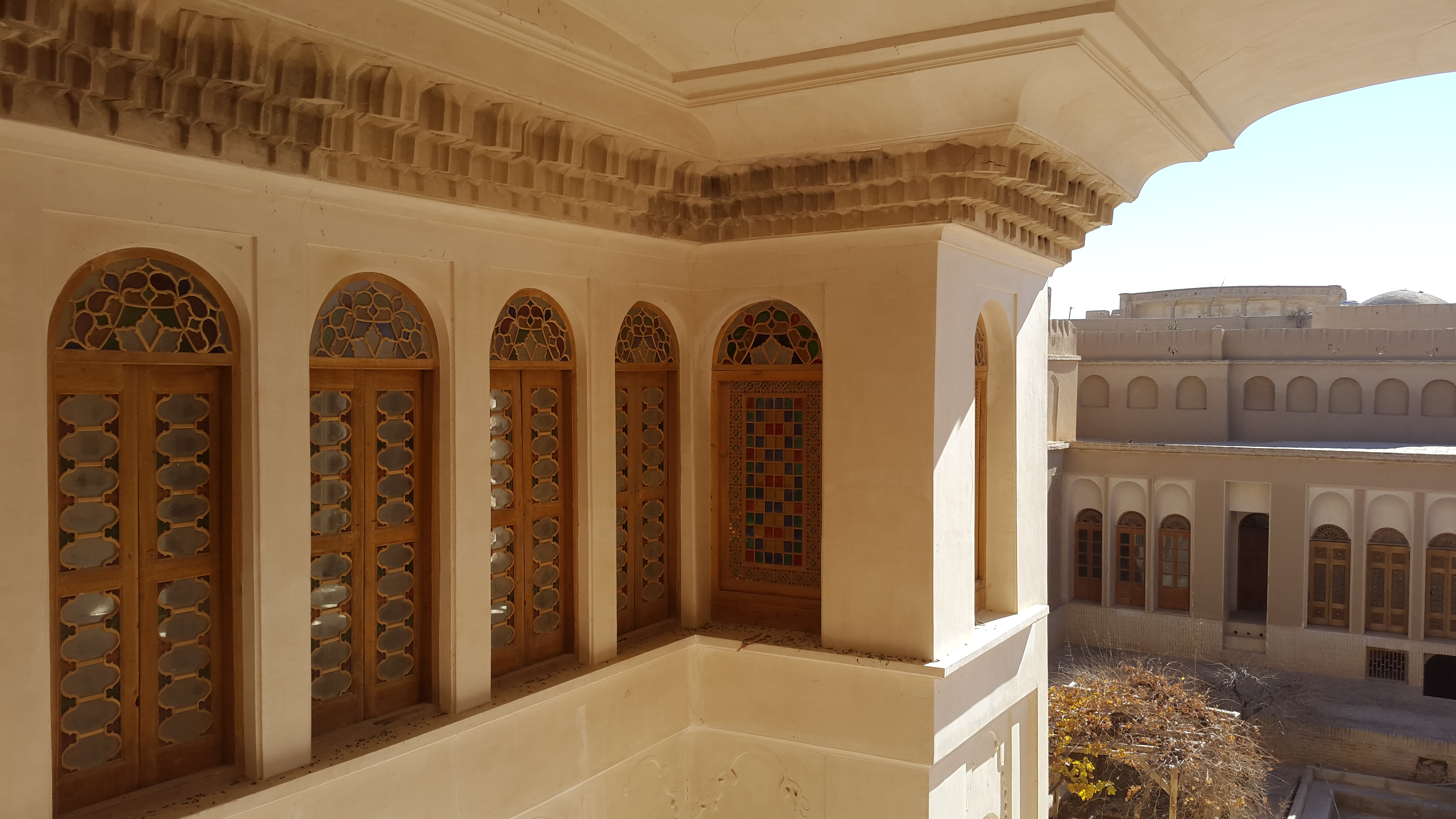
Exterior of the second-floor chambers

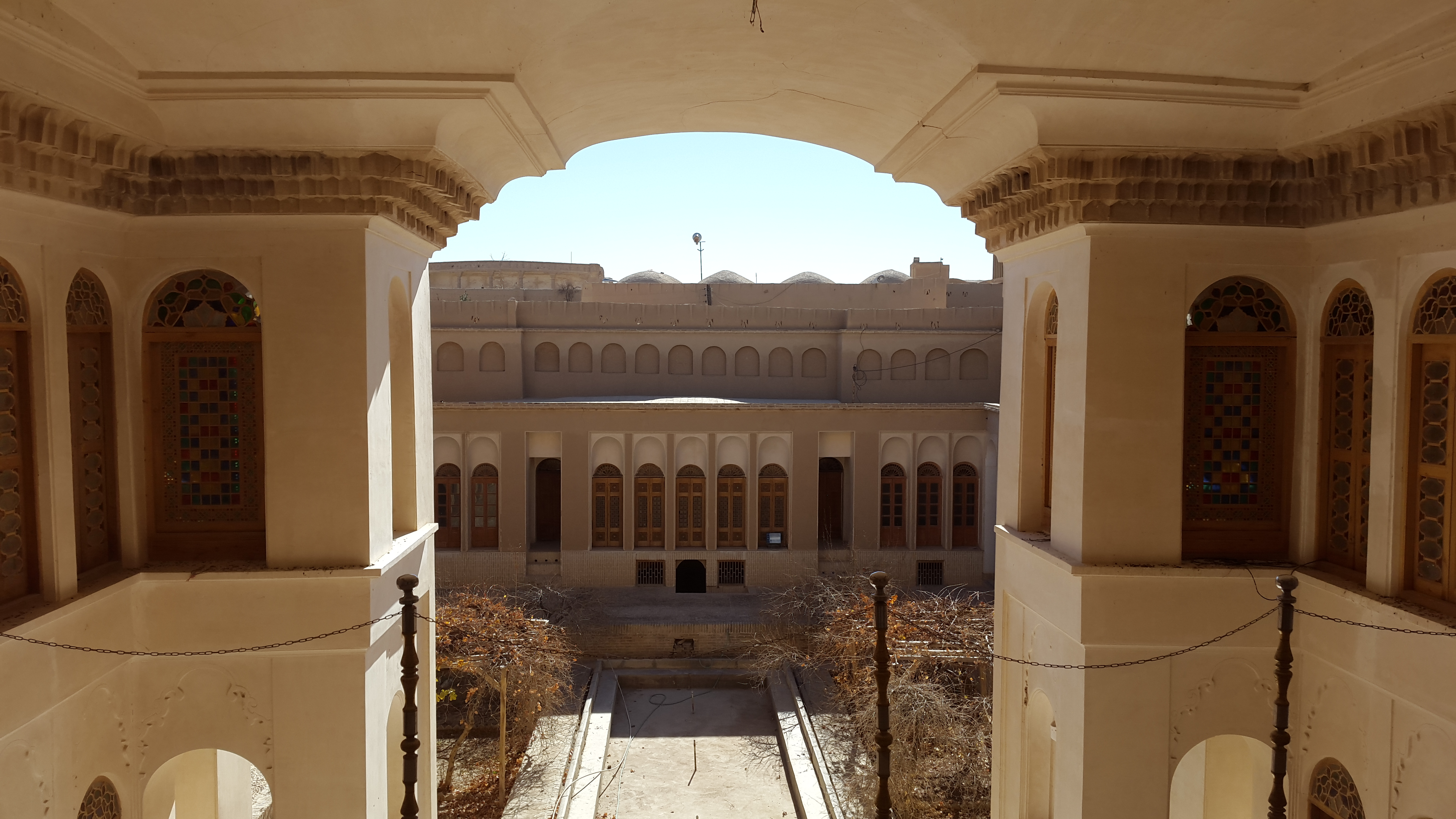
Courtyard view

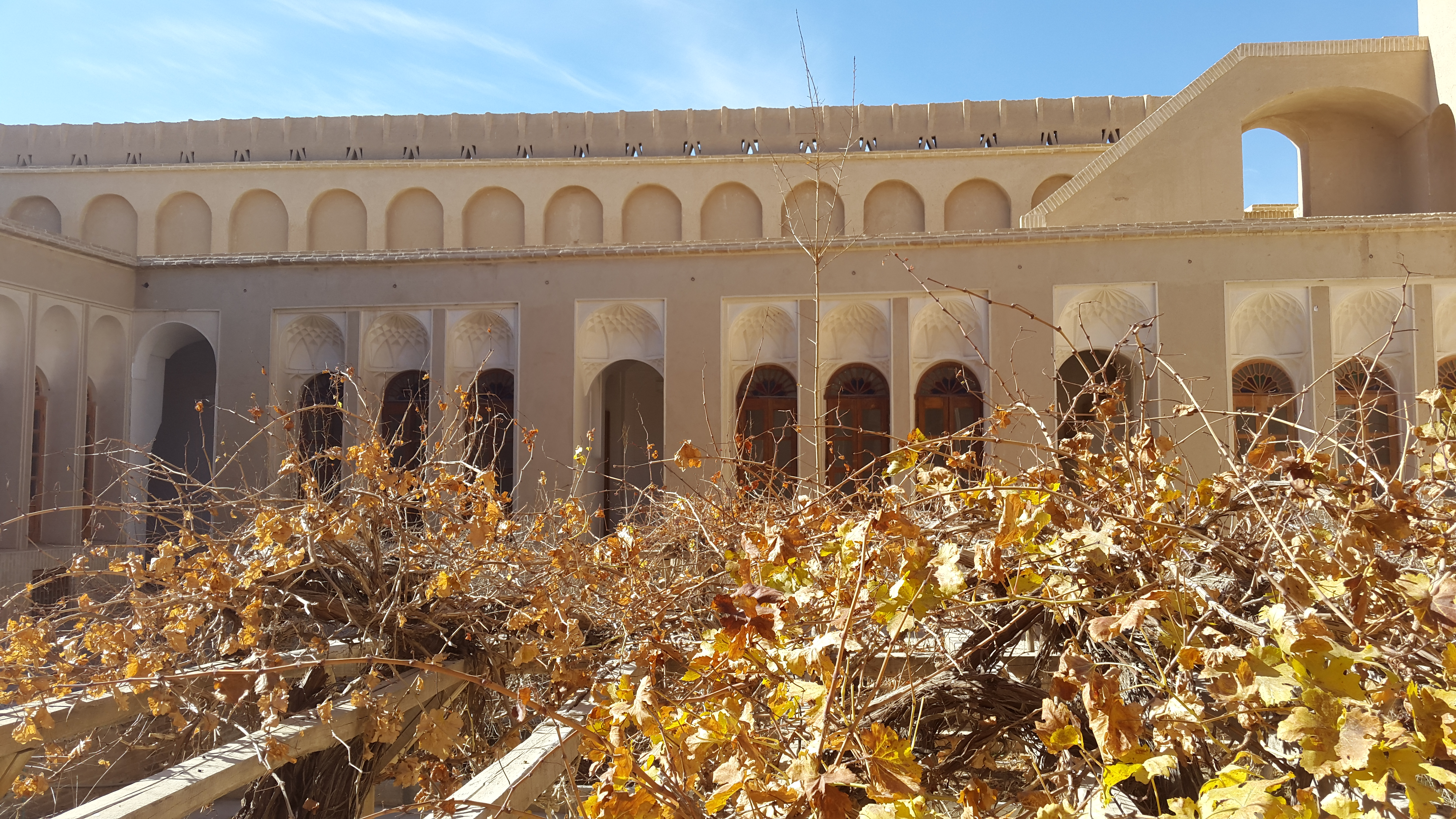
Exterior of the secondary side-rooms

== See also ==
- List of houses in Iran
- Architecture of Iran
