= Iranian toman =

Superunit of Iranian currency

تومان (Persian)
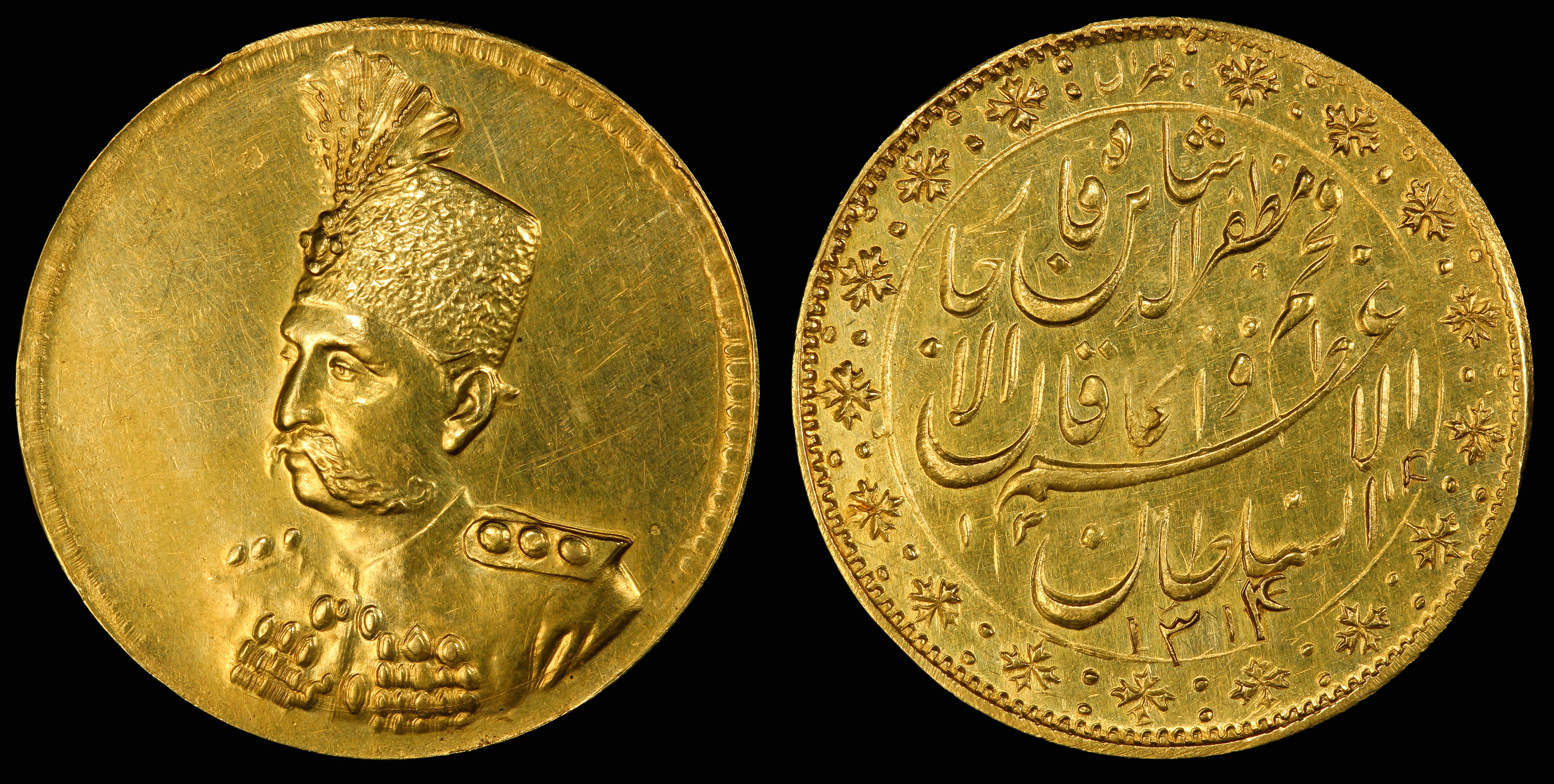
- 10-toman gold coin, AH 1314 (c. 1896), depicting Mozaffar ad-Din, shah of the Qajar dynasty

ISO 4217

Units of account
- Symbol: ₮
- Subunit
- 1/10,000: Dinar (former)
- 1/10: Rial (old, unofficial toman)
- 1/10,000: Rial (new, official toman)

Denominations
- Banknotes: ₮1, ₮2, ₮5, ₮10, ₮50, ₮100, ₮200, ₮500, ₮1000
- Coins: 50, 100, 250, 500, 1000, 2000, 5000 rials

Demographics
- User(s): Iran

Issuance
- Central bank: Iran
- This infobox shows the latest status before this currency was rendered obsolete.

The Iranian toman (Persian: تومان, romanized: tūmân, pronounced [tuː.mɒːn]; sign: ₮; abbreviated IRT) is a superunit of the official currency of Iran, the rial. One toman is equivalent to 10 (old), or 10,000 (new, official) rials. The name toman comes from Turco-Mongolian tümen "unit of ten thousand", (Note: According to Ki-Moon Lee, a professor of linguistics at the Seoul National University, the word "tumen" found in Altaic languages (a proposed language family, now widely seen as discredited) is "certainly a borrowing from Tocharian".) see the unit called tumen.

Originally, the toman consisted of 10,000 dinars. Between 1798 and 1825, the toman was also subdivided into eight rials, each of 1,250 dinars. In 1825, the qiran was introduced, worth 1,000 dinars or one-tenth of a toman. In 1932, the rial replaced the qiran at par, with one toman being equal to 10 rial. Colloquially, the toman is more used than the rial.

== Coins ==
Iranian gold coins were denominated in toman, with copper and silver coins denominated in dinar, rial or qiran. During the period of hammered coinage, gold toman coins were struck in denominations of 1/4, 1/2, 1, 2 and 10 toman, and later 1/5, 3 and 6 toman. With the introduction of milled coinage in 1878, denominations included 1/5, 1/2, 1, 2, 5, 10, and 25 toman. The last gold toman were issued in 1965, well after the toman had ceased to be an official Iranian currency.

== Banknotes ==
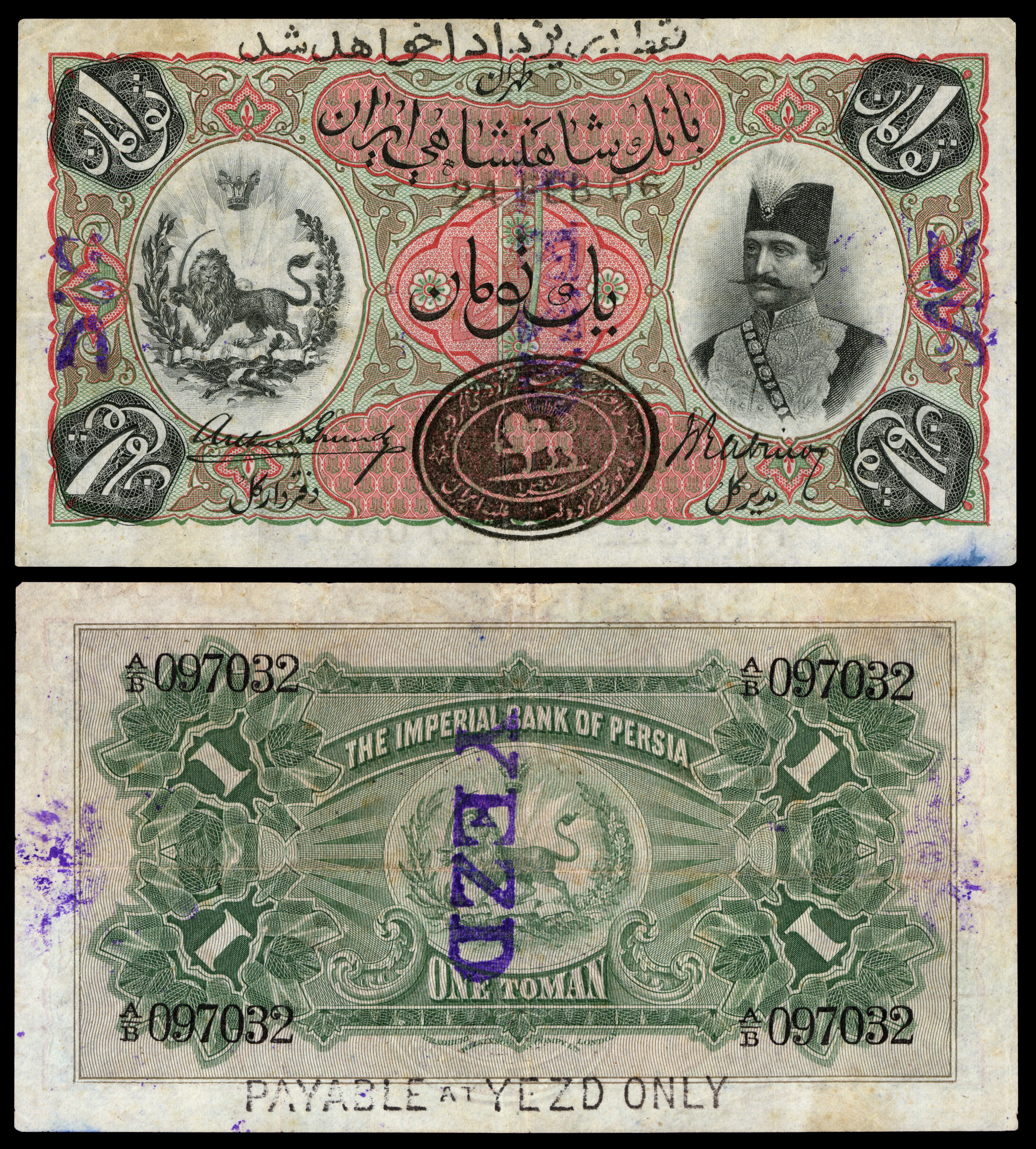
Imperial Bank of Persia, One Toman (1906), depicting Naser al-Din Shah Qajar

In 1890, the Imperial Bank of Persia introduced notes in denominations of 1, 2, 3, 5, 10, 20, 25, 50, 100, 500 and 1000 toman. These notes were issued until 1923. In 1924, a second series was introduced, consisting of 1, 2, 5, 10, 20, 50 and 100 toman notes which were issued until the rial was introduced in 1932. The higher-denomination notes were subject to frequent counterfeiting. Currently, since the value of the toman has fallen so much the standard banknotes are 1,000; 2,000; 5,000; 10,000; 50,000; and 100,000 Rial notes.

=== German-issued World War I occupation notes ===
Five marks (12 qiran 10 shahi)	10 marks (25 qiran)

During World War I, a group of German and Turkish soldiers occupied a small portion of Iran until 1918. They circulated five different denominations of German Imperial Treasury notes (printed around 1905) with a red overprint in Persian that were used locally at the rate of 4 marks to 1 toman. In addition to the 12 qiran 10 shahi (5 mark) and 25 qiran (10 mark) notes pictured, the rest of the issue included: 5 tomans (on a 20 mark-note), 25 tomans (on a 100 mark-note), and 250 tomans (on a 1,000 mark-note). Wilhelm Wassmuss appears to be given credit for the occupation and issue of currency.

== Status ==
In July 2019, the Iranian government approved a bill to change the national currency from the rial to the toman, with one toman equalling Rls 10,000, a process that would reportedly cost $160 million. This proposal was approved by the Iranian parliament in May 2020. The changeover was to be phased in over a period of up to two years.

On 5 October 2025, the Islamic Consultative Assembly voted in favor of a plan to redenominate Iran's currency. The new rial was made equal to 10,000 of the current rials and divided into 100 qirans. Both currencies would circulate in parallel for three years after the introduction of the redenominated currency.

== Sources ==
- Cuhaj, George S., ed. (2009a). Standard Catalog of World Gold Coins 1601–Present (6th ed.). Krause. ISBN 978-1-4402-0424-1.
- Cuhaj, George S., ed. (2009b). Standard Catalog of World Paper Money Specialized Issues (11 ed.). Krause. ISBN 978-1-4402-0450-0.
- Cuhaj, George S., ed. (2010). Standard Catalog of World Paper Money General Issues (1368–1960) (13 ed.). Krause. ISBN 978-1-4402-1293-2. Archived from the original on 2017-04-26.
