= Virtual currency law in Iran =

Iranian cryptocurrency regulation

In 2018, Iran recognized cryptocurrency mining as a legal industry in order to monitor and regulate the mining farms that were already operating. In December 2025 Iranian regime globally banned any and all transaction and transfer of cryptocurrency and along with that of in gold. In July 2018, President Hassan Rouhani's administration declared its intention of launching a national cryptocurrency, a news agency affiliated with the Central Bank of Iran outlined multiple features of the national cryptocurrency, stating that it would be backed by the Iran's national currency, the rial. The cryptocurrency could allow Iranians to make international transactions amidst trade embargo. As of December 2020 Iranians traded between $16 and $20 million in 12 different cryptocurrencies each day. Iran's mining amount of bitcoin is close to $1 billion a year.

On December 27th 2024 Iranian regime's Central Bank's new program effectively blocked all Iranian cryptocurrency to rial and vice versa payments through internet websites in Iran. In January 2025 the central bank began unblocking cryptomoney to fiat traders exchanges with their own government API for full access to user data.

In February 2025 Iranian regime started global ban on any and all crypto currency advertising in real life or online.

== Rial Currency ==
Rial Currency will be the digital currency of the Central Bank of Iran, which is considered as electronic cash and will be the electronic version of common banknotes in Iran. Its value is also attached to the existing traditional paper rial. According to the emphasis of the Central Bank of Iran, Rial Currency, unlike cryptocurrencies such as Bitcoin, cannot be mined and its supply will be regulated by this bank."arzdigital news". 20 August 2022.

== Sanctions ==
The Reuters news agency published a report that the leading crypto exchange Binance had processed $7.8 billion worth of transactions from Iranian firms since 2018 despite US financial sanctions. In this report, the relationship between Binance and Nobitex is discussed. Nobitex has responded to the Reuters claim that the exchange was used to skirt sanctions against Iran in relationship with Binance.

== See also ==
- Digital currency
- Cryptocurrency in Iran
