= Iranian rial =

Currency of Iran

ریال ایران (Persian)

ISO 4217
- Code: IRR (numeric: 364)
- Subunit: 0.01

Units of account
- Symbol: ﷼ (not in common use) in Persian; Rl/Rls or IR in Latin
- Superunit
- 8 (former) 10 (old, unofficial Rial) 10000 (new, official Rial): toman تومان plural تَوامين (tavāmīn) or تومانات (tūmānāt)
- Subunit
- 1/100: dinar (obsolete)

Denominations
- Banknotes
- Freq. used: Rls 10,000, Rls 20,000, Rls 50,000, Rls 100,000, Rls 500,000, Rls 1,000,000, Rls 2,000,000, Rls 5,000,000, Rls 10,000,000
- Coins
- Freq. used: Rls 5,000, Rls 1,000, Rls 2,000

Demographics
- Official user(s): Iran
- Unofficial users: Afghanistan; Saudi Arabia (Hajj only); Iraq

Issuance
- Central bank: CBI (Since 1960); BMI (1932–1960)
- Printer: SPMO (Since 1982); De La Rue (former); American Banknote Corporation (former)
- Mint: SPMO

Valuation
- Inflation: 87.9% (July 2026)
- Value: As of 29 September 2026: Official rate: US$1 = Rls 1,736,609; Free market: US$1 = Rls 2,685,000

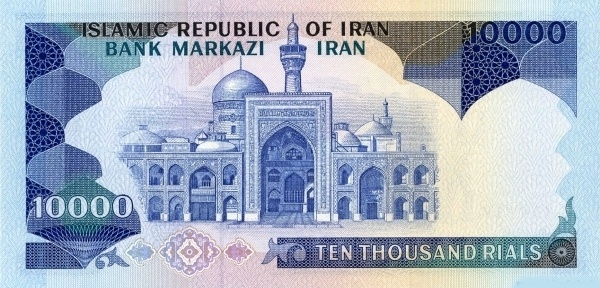

The rial (Persian: ریال ایران, romanised: Riāl-e Irān; symbol: ﷼; abbreviation: Rl (singular) and Rls (plural) or IR in Latin; ISO code: IRR) is the official currency of Iran. It is subdivided into 100 dinars, but due to the rial's low purchasing power, the dinar is not practically used. The Iranian toman is the primary colloquial denomination of the Iranian rial.

== Currency symbol ==
Although there is no official symbol for the currency, the Iranian standard ISIRI 820 defined a symbol for use on typewriters (mentioning that it is an invention of the standards committee itself), and the two Iranian standards ISIRI 2900 and ISIRI 3342 define a character code to be used for it. The Unicode Standard also has a compatibility character defined U+FDFC ﷼ RIAL SIGN.

== History ==
The rial was first introduced in 1798 as a coin worth 1,250 dinars or one-eighth of a toman. In 1825, the rial ceased to be issued, with the qiran subdivided into 20 shahi or 1,000 dinars and was worth one-tenth of a toman, being issued as part of a decimal system. The rial replaced the qiran at par in 1932, subdivided into 100 new dinars.

Prior to decimalisation in 1932, these coins and currencies were used, and some of these terms still have wide usage in Iranian languages and proverbs:

Old currency	Value	First Issue
Dinar	-	Umayyad Caliphate
Shahi	10 Dinars	Iranian Intermezzo
Abbasi	100 Dinars	Safavid Iran
Naderi	1,000 Dinars	Afsharid Iran
Rial	10,000 Dinars	Zand Iran
Qiran	100,000 Dinars	Early Qajar Iran
Toman	1,000,000 Dinars	Late Qajar Iran

== Exchange rate ==
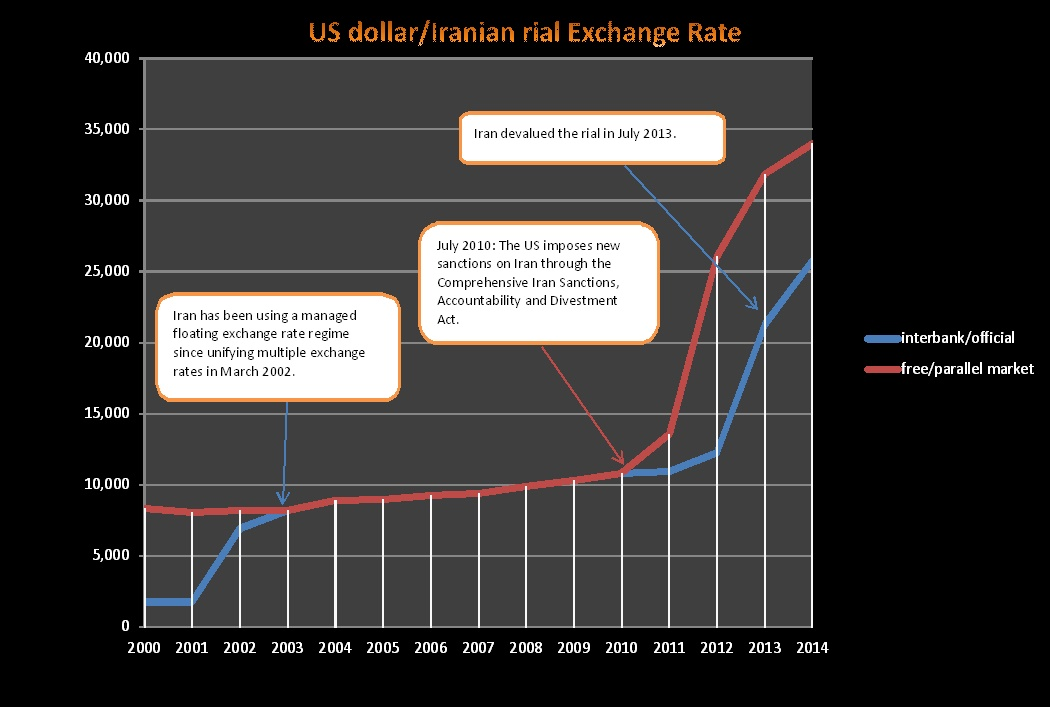
The Iranian rial remained relatively stable against the U.S. dollar until late 2011 when it lost two-thirds of its value within two years.

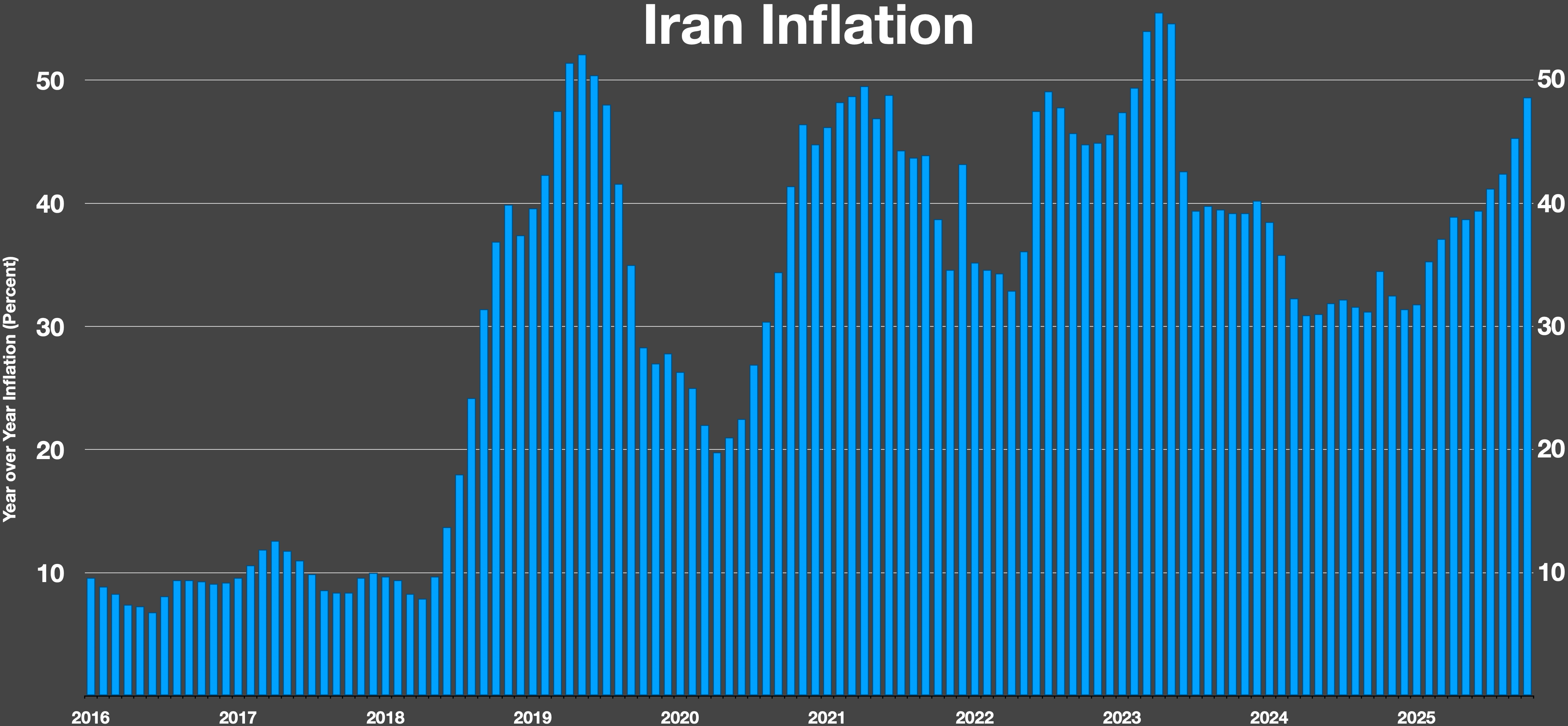
Between 2020 and 2025, the rate of inflation has been fluctuating around 49%.

In 1932, the rial was pegged to sterling at a rate of £1 = Rls 59.75. The exchange rate was £1 = Rls 80.25 in 1936, £1 = Rls 64.350 in 1939, £1 = Rls 68.8 in 1940, £1 = Rls 141 in 1941 and £1 = Rls 129 in 1942. In 1945, the rial was pegged to the U.S. dollar at US$1 = Rls 32.25. The rate was US$1 = Rls 75.75 in 1957. Iran did not follow the dollar's currency devaluation in 1973, leading to a new peg of US$1 = Rls 68.725. The dollar peg was dropped in 1975.

In 1979, 70 Rls equalled one U.S. dollar. The value of the rial declined precipitously after the Islamic Revolution because of capital flight from the country. A study estimated that the capital flight from Iran shortly before and after the revolution in the range of $30 to $40 billion. Whereas on March 15, 1978, Rls 71.46 equalled $1, in July 1999, $1 equalled Rls 9,430.

Injecting sudden foreign exchange revenues in the economic system forms the phenomenon of "Dutch disease" in a country. There are two main consequences for a country with Dutch disease: loss of price competitiveness in its production goods, and hence the exports of those goods; and an increase in imports. Both cases were clearly visible in Iran.

Although described as an (interbank) "market rate", the value of the Iranian rial is tightly controlled by the central bank. The state ownership of oil export earnings and its large reserves, supervision of letters of credit, together with current — and capital outflow account — outflows allows management of demand. The central bank has allowed the rial to weaken in nominal terms (4.6% on average in 2009) in order to support the competitiveness of non-oil exports.

There is an active black market in foreign exchange, but the development of the TSE rate and the ready availability of foreign exchange during 2000 narrowed the differential to as little as IR100 in mid-2000. However, the spread increased again in September 2010 because channels for transferring foreign currency to and from Iran being blocked because of international sanctions.

Monetary policy is facilitated by a network of 50 Iranian-run forex dealers in Iran, the rest of the Middle East and Europe. According to the Wall Street Journal and dealers, the Iranian government was selling US$250 million daily to keep the rial exchange rate against the US dollar between Rls 9,700 and Rls 9,900 in 2009.

The unofficial rial to US dollar rate underwent severe fluctuations in January 2012 (the rial losing 50% of its value in a few days, following new international sanctions against the CBI), eventually settling at Rls 17,000 at the end of the period. Besides all the bad effects on the economy in general, this had the effect of boosting the competitiveness of Iran's domestic industries abroad. Following President Mahmoud Ahmadinejad's decision to liberalise the mechanism by which bank interest rates are set (granting banks the authority to raise interest rates to 21%),

By June 2020, the Iranian rial had fallen nearly five-fold since the beginning of 2018, contributing to the record inflation. Reason cited by analysts is the fact that the government has been printing money in excess of the economic growth.

The rial's exchange rate dropped by 29% after the nationwide protests that began on September 16, 2022, following the death of Mahsa Amini, a 22 year old Kurdish-Iranian woman in police custody. Following the regional tension towards the end of 2024, the fall of Bashar al-Assad's regime in Syria, Donald Trump winning the US presidential election and ongoing economic factors brought the rial to its lowest value at the end of 2024, 820,500 to 1 US dollar.

The rial exchange rate started 2025 at 817,500 rials to the US dollar, and declined all year with annualised inflation rate never lower than 36.4%, rising to 42% late in the year. The exchange rate dropped all year, including following the government of Israel striking Iran and starting the Twelve-Day War in June. In December 2025, the rial dropped to a record low of 1.42 million rials to the US dollar, resulting in the resignation of the Governor of the Central Bank of Iran Mohammad Reza Farzin on December 29, 2025, who took office in December 2022 with the rial trading at 430,000 to the dollar. The collapse in the exchange rate was one of the causes of the 2025–2026 Iranian protests.

On August 23, 2026, the price of the U.S. dollar surpassed two million rials in the open market, and the rial fell further to 2.5 million rials per dollar on September 29, 2026.

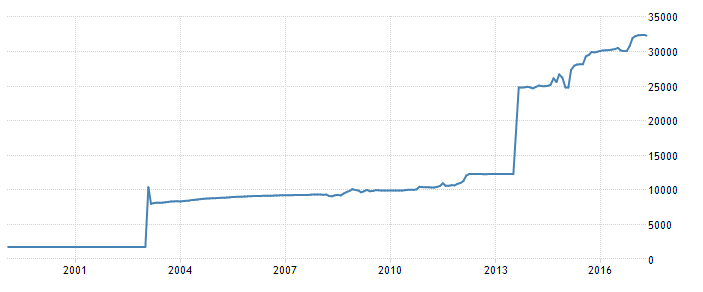
US dollar – Iranian rial official exchange rate graph (2000–2017)

Official vs. free exchange rates (rials per US dollar)
Year	Official rate	Transfer/business/trade/parallel/free rate
2003	8,193	8,193
2004	8,885	8,885
2005	8,964	8,964
2006	9,227	9,227
2007	9,408	9,408
2008	9,143	9,143
2009	9,900	9,900
2010	10,308	10,308
2011	10,800	13,568
2012	12,175.5	26,059
2013	18,517.2	31,839
2014	25,780.2	32,385
2017	33,127	59,500
2018	42,000	135,000
2019	42,000	129,500
2020	42,000	253,940
2021	42,000	273,080
2022	41,850	427,000
2024	767,550	767,550
2025	1.42 million	1,400,000
2026	2.21 million	2,662,000 Current

Pre-unification, rials per US dollar:

- Market: 8,200 (2002); 8,050 (2001); 8,350 (2000)
- Preferred: 6,906 (2002); 1,753 (2001); 1,764 (2000)

=== Current market exchange rates ===
Current IRR exchange rates
From Google Finance:	AUD CAD CHF CNY EUR GBP HKD JPY USD INR AED TRY
From Yahoo! Finance:	AUD CAD CHF CNY EUR GBP HKD JPY USD INR AED TRY
From XE.com:	AUD CAD CHF CNY EUR GBP HKD JPY USD INR AED TRY
From OANDA:	AUD CAD CHF CNY EUR GBP HKD JPY USD INR AED TRY

=== Exchange rate system ===
Until 2002, Iran's exchange rate system was based on a multi-layered system, where state and para-state enterprises benefited from the "preferred or official rate" (Rls 1,750 for US$1) while the private sector paid the "market rate" (Rls 8,000 for US$1), hence creating an unequal competition environment. The "official rate" applied to oil and gas export receipts, imports of essential goods and services, and repayment of external debt. The "export rate", fixed at Rls 3,000 per dollar since May 1995, applied to all other trade transactions, but mainly to capital goods imports of public enterprises.

In 1998, in order to ease pressure on exporters, the central bank introduced a currency certificate system allowing exporters to trade certificates for hard currency on the Tehran Stock Exchange, thus creating a floating value for the rial known as the "TSE rate" or "market rate". This method finally replaced the fixed "export rate" (Rls 3,000:US$1) in March 2000, and has since held steady at some Rls 8,500:US$1.

In March 2002, the multi-tiered system was replaced by a unified, market-driven exchange rate. In 2002 the "official rate" a/k/a "preferred rate" (Rls 1,752:US$1) was abolished, and the TSE rate became the basis for the new unified foreign-exchange regime.

==== Forex bourse ====
In a move interpreted as aiming at unifying currency exchange rates, on September 24, 2012, the government launched a foreign exchange centre, that would provide importers of some basic goods with foreign exchanges, at a rate about 2% cheaper than the open market rate on a given day. This project was cancelled following the strong depreciation of the rial between 2012 and 2013 but was put on the agenda again in 2015 for use in the reunification of forex rates (planned for 2017) and the introduction of currency derivatives. through the Iran Mercantile Exchange.

In addition to banks, exchange shops are also available for limited transactions. Exchange shops must operate under the licenses issued by Central Bank of Iran. Foreign currencies can be bought or sold at these exchange shops.

==== Exchange restriction ====
Exchange restriction arises from limitations on the transferability of rial profits from certain investments under the Foreign Investment Promotion and Protection Act and from limitations on other investment-related current international payments under this act.

==== Multiple currency practices ====
In 2010, the cases of multiple currency practices arose from the following:

1. Budget subsidies for foreign exchange purchases in connection with payments of certain letters of credit opened prior to March 21, 2002, under the previous multiple exchange rate system (see above);
2. Obligations of entities that had received allocations of foreign exchange at subsidised "allocated rates" under the previous multiple exchange rate system to surrender unused allocations to the Central Bank of Iran at the allocation rate.

Until 2012, the dollar had different exchange rates, depending on where you are buying your currency:

- Official exchange rate
- Free trade zone exchange rate
- Referential exchange rate
- Black market exchange rate

In 2012, Bank Markazi classified a long list of goods into categories with priorities 1 through 10, leaving it to the parallel market to take of all other needs. Priorities 1 and 2 are food and medicine, receiving foreign exchange at the official rate of Rls 12,260 per dollar, followed by other categories with lower priorities, which are mostly intermediate goods used in industrial production.

==== Redenomination ====
Because of the current low value of rial, and that people rarely use the term, redenomination or change of currency has been proposed a number of times since the late 1980s. The issue has re-emerged and been under discussion, as a result of issuance of larger banknotes in 2003. Opponents of redenomination are wary of more inflation resulting from psychological effects, and increase in velocity of money leading to more instabilities in the economy of Iran.

On April 12, 2007, the Economics Commission of the Parliament announced initiation of a statute in draft to change the currency, claiming redenominations had helped reduce inflation elsewhere, such as in Turkey. In 2008, an official at the Central Bank of Iran said the bank plans to slash four zeros off the rial and rename it the toman. The bank printed two new traveller's cheques, which function quite similar to a banknote, with values of Rls 500,000 and Rls 1,000,000. However, they have the figures "50" (should read 50 thousand toman) and "100" (should read 100 thousand toman) written on their top right hand corners, respectively, which is seen as the first step toward a new currency.

In 2010, President Mahmoud Ahmadinejad announced that Iran would remove three zeros (not the four that had been proposed) from its national currency as part of the economic reform plan.

In April 2011, it was reported that the Central Bank is working on a six-month redenomination project to cut four zeros from the national currency and replace old bank notes with new ones, similar to the revaluation of the Turkish lira in 2005.

A website to poll the public on the redenomination plan was launched on July 21, 2011; the public was allowed to vote on how many zeroes to cut and what the new currency's name should be. Preliminary results indicate that four zeroes would be cut (in line with the government's recommendation) and that the name will be changed to Parsi.

In 2016, the government announced its plan to end the official status of the rial, replacing it with the commonly used unit the toman (which represents 10 rials).

In July 2019, the Iranian government approved a bill to change the national currency from the rial to the toman with one toman equalling Rls 10,000, a process which will reportedly cost $160 million. This proposal was approved by the Iranian parliament in May 2020. The changeover is likely to be phased over a period of up to two years.

On October 5, 2025, the Islamic Consultative Assembly voted in favour of a plan to redenominate Iran's currency. The new rial was made equal to 10,000 of the current rials and divided into 100 qirans. Both currencies would circulate in parallel for three years after the introduction of the redenominated currency.

== Coins ==
=== Classical rial ===
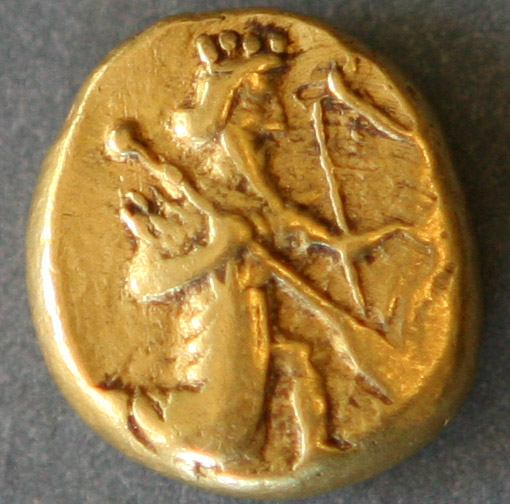
A golden daric coin minted during the time of the ancient Persian Empire

During the late 18th and early 19th century, silver coins were issued in denominations of 1/8, 1/4, 1/2 and 1 rial.

=== Modern rial ===
The first coins of the second rial currency, introduced in 1932, were in denominations of 1, 2, 5, 10 and 25 dinars, Rl 1/2, Rl 1, Rls 2 and Rls 5, with the Rls 1/2 to Rls 5 coins minted in silver. Gold coins denominated in pahlavi were also issued, initially valued at Rls 100. In 1944, the silver coinage was reduced in size, with the smallest silver coins being the Rls 1 pieces. Minting of all denominations below 25 dinars ended in this year. In 1945, silver Rls 10 coins were introduced. In 1953, silver coins ceased to be minted, with the smallest denomination now 50 dinars. Rls 20 coins were introduced in 1972.

After the Islamic Revolution, the coinage designs were changed to remove the Shah's effigy but the sizes and compositions were not immediately changed. 50 dinar coins were only minted in 1979 and Rls 50 coins were introduced in 1980. In 1992, a new coinage was introduced with smaller Rls 1, Rls 5, Rls 10 and Rls 50 coins and new Rls 100 pieces. Rls 250 coins were introduced the following year. In 2004, the sizes of the Rls 50, Rls 100 and Rls 250 coins were reduced and Rls 500 coins were introduced. New, smaller types of Rls 250 and Rls 500 were introduced in 2009, along with the new denomination of Rls 1,000. Rls 2,000 and Rls 5,000 rial coins in 2010.

=== Digital Rial ===
Digital Rial, also called Crypto Rial or Iran's National Currency, is a type of currency according to a 2021 announcement of the Central Bank of the Islamic Republic of Iran. Its release is based on the Modern Rial.

==== Current series ====
Iranian rial coins currently in circulation
Image		Value	Technical parameters				Description			Date of
Obverse	Reverse	Value	Diameter	Thickness	Mass	Composition	Edge	Obverse	Reverse	first minting
		Rls 50	20.2 mm	1.33 mm	3.5 g	copper nickel aluminium	Reeded	Value, motif, year of minting, "Islamic Republic of Iran"	Fatima Masumeh Shrine	2004
		Rls 100	22.95 mm	1.36 mm	4.6 g	copper nickel aluminium	Reeded	Value, motif, year of minting, "Islamic Republic of Iran"	Imam Reza Shrine	2004
		Rls 250	18.8 mm	1.56 mm	2.8 g	copper nickel aluminium	Reeded	Value, motif, year of minting, "Islamic Republic of Iran"	Feyziyeh School	2009
		Rls 500	20.8 mm	1.66 mm	3.9 g	copper nickel aluminium	Reeded	Value, motif, year of minting, "Islamic Republic of Iran"	Saadi's Mausoleum in Shiraz	2009
		Rls 1,000	23.7 mm	1.9 mm	5.8 g	copper nickel aluminium	Reeded	Value, motif, year of minting, "Islamic Republic of Iran"	Khaju Bridge	2009
		Rls 2,000	26.3 mm	1.76 mm	6.8 g	copper nickel zinc	Reeded	Value, motif, year of minting, "Islamic Republic of Iran"	Shrine of Imam Reza	2010
		Rls 5,000	29.3 mm	2 mm	10.1 g	copper nickel zinc	Reeded	Value, motif, year of minting, "Islamic Republic of Iran"	Text, Fiftieth Anniversary of Foundation of the Central Bank of the Islamic Republic of Iran	2010
These images are to scale at 2.5 pixels per millimetre. For table standards, see the coin specification table.

== Banknotes ==
In 1932, notes were issued by the "Bank Melli Iran" in denominations of Rls 5, Rls 10, Rls 20, Rls 50, Rls 100 and Rls 500. Rls 1,000 notes were introduced in 1935, followed by Rls 200 notes in 1951 and Rls 5,000 and Rls 10,000 in 1952. Rls 5 notes were last issued in the 1940s, with Rls 10 notes disappearing in the 1960s. In 1961, the Central Bank of Iran took over the issuance of paper money.

Defaced banknote

In 1979, after the Islamic revolution, Iranian banknotes featuring the Shah were defaced with stamps to hide his face. The first regular issues of the Islamic Republic were in denominations of Rls 100, Rls 200, Rls 500, Rls 1,000, Rls 5,000 and Rls 10,000. Rls 2,000 notes were introduced in 1986.

They are issued by the Central Bank of Iran, each bearing the signature of the President of the Iranian Central Bank. The Rls 100, Rls 200 and Rls 500 banknotes are becoming increasingly uncommon; shopkeepers habitually give out small packages of gum in lieu of the last Rls 500 of change. For day-to-day purposes, people carry wads of Rls 100,000 notes.

=== Qajar Series (1850–1925) ===
Current series
Image		Value	Dimensions (millimetres)	Main color	Description	
Obverse	Reverse	Value	Dimensions (millimetres)	Main color	Obverse	Reverse
		1 toman	130 × 67	Silver	Naser al-Din Shah Qajar	Value, "Imperial State of Iran"
		5 tomans	136 × 69	Tan	Naser al-Din Shah Qajar	Value, "Imperial State of Iran"
		50 tomans	142 × 71	Gray	Naser al-Din Shah Qajar	Value, Lion and Sun

=== Reza Shah Series (1925–1941) ===
Current series
Image		Value	Dimensions (millimetres)	Main color	Description	
Obverse	Reverse	Value	Dimensions (millimetres)	Main color	Obverse	Reverse
		Rls 5	130 × 67	Green	Reza Shah Pahlavi	Value, Lion and Sun with crown
		Rls 10	136 × 69	Brown	Reza Shah Pahlavi	Value, Lion and Sun with crown
		Rls 20	142 × 71	Purple	Reza Shah Pahlavi	Value, Lion and Sun with crown
		Rls 500	142 × 71	Navy	Reza Shah Pahlavi	Tomb of Cyrus
		Rls 1,000	148 × 73	Silver	Reza Shah Pahlavi	Mount Damavand

=== Mohammad Reza Shah Series (1942–1978) ===
Current series
Image		Value	Dimensions (millimetres)	Main color	Description	
Obverse	Reverse	Value	Dimensions (millimetres)	Main color	Obverse	Reverse
		Rls 10	130 × 67	Silver	Mohammad Reza Shah Pahlavi	Imperial seal of Darius the Great
		Rls 10	130 × 67	Silver	Mohammad Reza Shah Pahlavi	Avicenna Mausoleum
		Rls 10	130 × 67	Silver	Mohammad Reza Shah Pahlavi	Amir Kabir Dam
		Rls 20	130 × 67	Orange	Mohammad Reza Shah Pahlavi	Amir Kabir Dam
		Rls 50	130 × 67	Green	Mohammad Reza Shah Pahlavi	Mohammad Reza Shah Pahlavi in a public meeting
		Rls 50	130 × 67	Green	Mohammad Reza Shah Pahlavi	Pasargadae
		Rls 100	136 × 69	Purple	Mohammad Reza Shah Pahlavi	Social services
		Rls 100	136 × 69	Purple	Mohammad Reza Shah Pahlavi	Marble Palace
		Rls 100	136 × 69	Purple	Reza Shah Pahlavi and Mohammad Reza Shah Pahlavi	50th Anniversary of the establishment of the Pahlavi dynasty
		Rls 200	136 × 69	Blue-green	Mohammad Reza Shah Pahlavi	Shahyad Tower
		Rls 500	142 × 71	Silver-yellow	Mohammad Reza Shah Pahlavi	Marlik Cup
		Rls 1,000	148 × 73	Brown	Mohammad Reza Shah Pahlavi	Tomb of Hafez
		Rls 5,000	154 × 75	Blue	Mohammad Reza Shah Pahlavi	Golestan Palace
		Rls 10,000	160 × 77	Green	Mohammad Reza Shah Pahlavi	Baharestan Palace

=== Imam Reza Shrine Series (1980–1982) ===
Current series
Image		Value	Dimensions (millimetres)	Main color	Description	
Obverse	Reverse	Value	Dimensions (millimetres)	Main color	Obverse	Reverse
		Rls 100	142×71	Purple	Imam Reza shrine	Chaharbagh School
		Rls 200	148×73	Blue-green	Imam Reza shrine	Avicenna Mausoleum
		Rls 500	154×75	Brown	Imam Reza shrine	Winged horse
		Rls 1,000	160×77	Pink	Imam Reza shrine	Tomb of Hafez
		Rls 5,000	166×79	Purple	Imam Reza shrine	Tehran's Oil refinery
		Rls 10,000	172×81	Green	Imam Reza shrine	Baharestan Palace

=== Revolution Series (1981–2005) ===
Current series
Image		Value	Dimensions (millimetres)	Main color	Description	
Obverse	Reverse	Value	Dimensions (millimetres)	Main color	Obverse	Reverse
		Rls 100	130×67	Purple	Hassan Modarres	Old building of Islamic Consultative Assembly
		Rls 200	136×69	Grey	Jame Mosque of Yazd	Agricultural Workers
		Rls 500	142×71	Gray-green	Friday prayers	University of Tehran main entrance
		Rls 1,000	148×73	Brown	Feyziyeh School	Dome of the Rock
		Rls 2,000	151×74	Purple	Liberation of Khorramshahr	Kaaba
		Rls 5,000	154×75	Red	Revolutionaries	Fatima Masumeh Shrine
		Rls 10,000	160×77	Blue	Revolutionaries	Imam Reza shrine

=== Ruhollah Khomeini Series (1992–2019) ===
Current series
Image		Value	Dimensions (millimetres)	Main color	Description	
Obverse	Reverse	Value	Dimensions (millimetres)	Main color	Obverse	Reverse
		Rls 1,000	148 × 73	Brown	Ruhollah Khomeini	Dome of the Rock
		Rls 2,000	151 × 74	Onion-skin purple	Ruhollah Khomeini	Kaaba
		Rls 5,000	154 × 75	Brown-olive	Ruhollah Khomeini	Flowers and birds
		Rls 5,000	154 × 75	Brown-olive	Ruhollah Khomeini	Omid satellite, Safir 2 rocket, globe with the marked territory of Iran
		Rls 5,000	154 × 75	Brown-olive	Ruhollah Khomeini	Pottery from Zabol (Eastern Iran)
		Rls 10,000	160 × 77	Green	Ruhollah Khomeini	Mount Damavand
		Rls 20,000	163 × 78	Blue	Ruhollah Khomeini	Naqsh-e Jahan Square
		Rls 20,000	163 × 78	Blue	Ruhollah Khomeini	Jami Al-Aqsa
		Rls 20,000	163 × 78	Blue	Ruhollah Khomeini	Aghazadeh Mansion
		Rls 50,000	166 × 79	Ochre	Ruhollah Khomeini	Map of Iran with atom symbol, quote in Persian from the prophet Mohammed ("If the science exists in this constellation, men from Persia will reach it"), and "Persian Gulf" in English
		Rls 50,000	166 × 79	Ochre	Ruhollah Khomeini	University of Tehran main entrance
		Rls 100,000	166 × 79	Light olive greenish	Ruhollah Khomeini	Saadi's Mausoleum in Shiraz

=== Intergenerational series (2019–2023) ===
In preparation for an upcoming redenomination whereby Rls 10,000 will become one toman, notes of this series display the numerical value in tomans as well as rials (the latter with the trailing four zeros de-emphasised). Due to a shortage of paper currency, higher denominations have been issued as cheques rather than legal tender banknotes.

Image		Value	Dimensions (millimetres)	Main color	Description		
Obverse	Reverse	Value	Dimensions (millimetres)	Main color	Obverse	Reverse	Year
		Rls 10,000 (1 toman)	156 × 71	Grey	Ruhollah Khomeini	Avicenna Mausoleum in Hamadan	2021
		Rls 20,000 (2 tomans)	156 × 71	Blue	Ruhollah Khomeini	Maqbaratoshoara in Tabriz	2021
		Rls 50,000 (5 tomans)	156 × 71	Purple	Ruhollah Khomeini	Tomb of Hafez in Shiraz	2021
		Rls 100,000 (10 tomans)	156 × 71	Green	Ruhollah Khomeini	Tomb of Saadi in Shiraz	2020

=== Issuance of larger notes ===
Printing banknotes larger than Rls 10,000 was first proposed in 1989, and in 1992 the central bank asked for government permission to print Rls 20,000, Rls 50,000 and Rls 100,000 notes. This was not realised at that time, due to fears of inflation and counterfeiting. The Rls 10,000 note remained the highest valued banknote for more than 50 years until 2005, when a Rls 20,000 banknote was introduced and subsequently a Rls 50,000 banknote was introduced with the subject being the Iranian nuclear energy programme. The note was issued March 12. The note features a quote by the prophet Mohammed, translated as: "Even if knowledge is at the Pleiades, the people from the land of Persia would attain it". Banknotes currently in circulation are Rls 100, Rls 200, Rls 500, Rls 1,000, Rls 2,000, Rls 5,000, Rls 10,000, Rls 20,000, Rls 50,000 and Rls 100,000. After the death of Ruhollah Khomeini, his portrait was used on the obverse of Rls 1,000 banknotes and greater.

=== Cash cheques ===
Currently the highest valued legal tender banknote issued by the central bank is Rls 100,000 (about US$0.074 on January 2, 2026). However Iran Cheques circulate freely and are treated as cash.

The central bank used to allow major state banks to print their own banknotes known as "cash cheques". They were a form of bearer teller's-cheque with fixed amounts, printed in the form of official banknotes. Once they were acquired from banks, they could function like cash for a year. Two forms of these banknotes were available. One known as "Iran cheque" could be cashed in any financial institution, while the other could be cashed at the issuing bank. They were printed in denominations of Rls 200,000, Rls 500,000, Rls 1,000,000, Rls 2,000,000, and Rls 5,000,000.

In 2008, CBI revoked this privilege from banks, and currently issues its own Iran Cheques in denominations of Rls 500,000, Rls 1,000,000, Rls 2,000,000, Rls 5,000,000, and Rls 10,000,000.

Iran Cheque
Image		Value	Dimensions (millimetres)	Main color	Description		Year
Obverse	Reverse	Value	Dimensions (millimetres)	Main color	Obverse	Reverse	Year
		Rls 500,000	160 × 75	Purple	Imam Reza Shrine in Mashhad	Persian Calligraphy	2008–2014
		Rls 500,000	142 × 71	Indigo	Imam Reza Shrine in Mashhad	Tomb of Hafez	2014–2015
		Rls 500,000	156 × 71	Red	Imam Reza Shrine in Mashhad	Mount Damavand in Mazandaran	2018–2022
		Rls 1,000,000	160 × 75	Brown	Tachara in Persepolis	Persian calligraphy with floral and geometric patterns.	2008
		Rls 1,000,000	160 × 75	Blue	Tachara in Persepolis	Persian calligraphy with floral and geometric patterns.	2010
		Rls 1,000,000	156 × 71	Blue	Tachara in Persepolis	South Pars Gas-Condensate field in Persian Gulf	2020–2022
		Rls 1,000,000	156 × 71	Blue	Shrine of Fatima Masumeh in Qom	South Pars Gas-Condensate field in Persian Gulf	2022–2023
		Rls 2,000,000	160 × 75	Teal	Karun-3 Dam	Persian calligraphy with floral and geometric patterns.	2008
		Rls 2,000,000	156 × 71	Teal	Naqsh-e Jahan Square, Isfahan	Men playing chogan	2025
		Rls 5,000,000	156 × 71	Yellow	Agha Bozorg Mosque, Kashan	Tomb of Ferdowsi, Tus	2025
		Rls 10,000,000	156 × 71	Fuchsia	Jameh Mosque, Yazd	Arg-e Bam Fortress, Bam	2026

== Printing ==
Security Paper Mill (called TAKAB) is a paper mill and a subsidiary of the Central Bank of Iran responsible for production of security papers, including those of the Iranian rial banknotes located in the city of Amol.

== See also ==
- Economy of Iran
- Electronic currency in Iran
- International rankings of Iran in economy
- Iranian Oil Bourse – Commodity exchange in Kish, Iran
- Iranian qiran – Currency of Iran between 1825 and 1932
- Iranian toman – Superunit of Iranian currency
- Omani rial – Currency of Oman
- Qatari riyal – Currency of Qatar
- Saudi riyal – Currency of Saudi Arabia
- Shetab Banking System – Iranian banking clearance system
- Yemeni rial – Currency of Yemen

Iranian rial
Preceded by: Iranian qiran Reason: removed from Iranian currency by National Bank; Ratio: at par	Currency of Iran; 1932 – TBD	Succeeded by: New Iranian rial Reason: financial reform Ratio: 10,000 current rials = 1 new rial
