= Iranian qiran =

Currency of Iran between 1825 and 1932

قِران (Persian)

ISO 4217

Units of account
- Superunit
- 100/1: Iranian Rial

Demographics
- Date of introduction: 22 November 2025
- User(s): Iran

Issuance
- Central bank: Iran

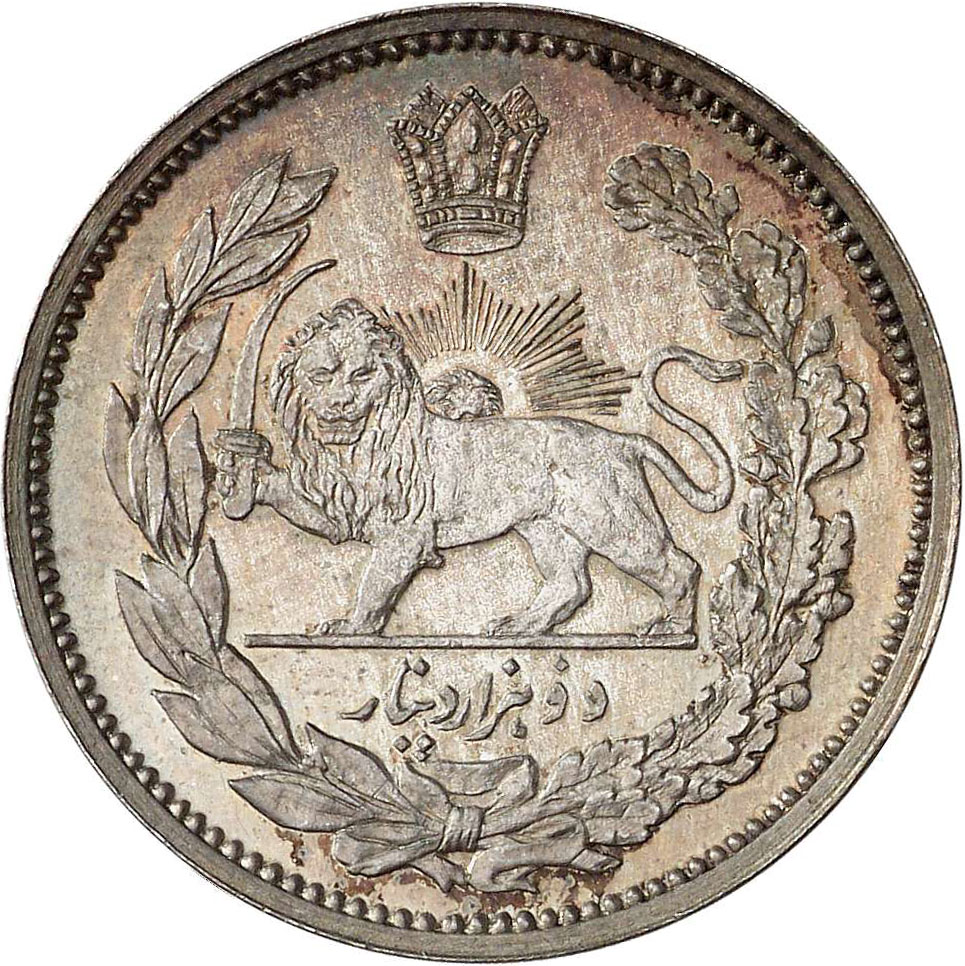
A 2000 Dinar/2 Qiran coin of Mohammad Ali Shah Qajar era

The qiran (Persian: قران; also Romanized kran) was a currency of Iran between 1825 and 1932. It was subdivided into 20 shahi or 1000 dinar and was worth one tenth of a toman. The rial replaced the qiran at par in 1932, although it was divided into one hundred (new) dinars. Despite the qiran no longer being an official denomination, the term still enjoys wide usage among Iranians.

== Value ==
From 1874 to 1895, the value of the qiran depreciated by half relative to sterling, from 1 qiran equal to 9.6d. (25 qirans for £1 stg) to 4.8d. (50 qirans for £1 stg), which then kept that value for the next few years.

In 1930, it was pegged to sterling at 59.75 qirans = £1 stg, although a regulated parallel market existed where the price of sterling was much higher than the aforementioned legal rate.

== Coins ==
Until 1876, silver coins were minted in denominations of 1/8, 1/4, 1/2 and 1 qiran. A milled coinage was introduced in 1876, with denominations of 12, 25, 50, 100 and 200 dinar, 1/4, 1/2, 1, 2 and 5 qiran. Gold coins and banknotes were denominated in toman.

Iranian qiran
Preceded by: Iranian toman Reason: removed from Iranian currency by The King; Ratio: 10 qiran = 1 toman	Currency of Iran; 1825 – 1932	Succeeded by: Iranian Rial; Reason: modern economy Ratio: at par
