= Cryptocurrency in Iran =

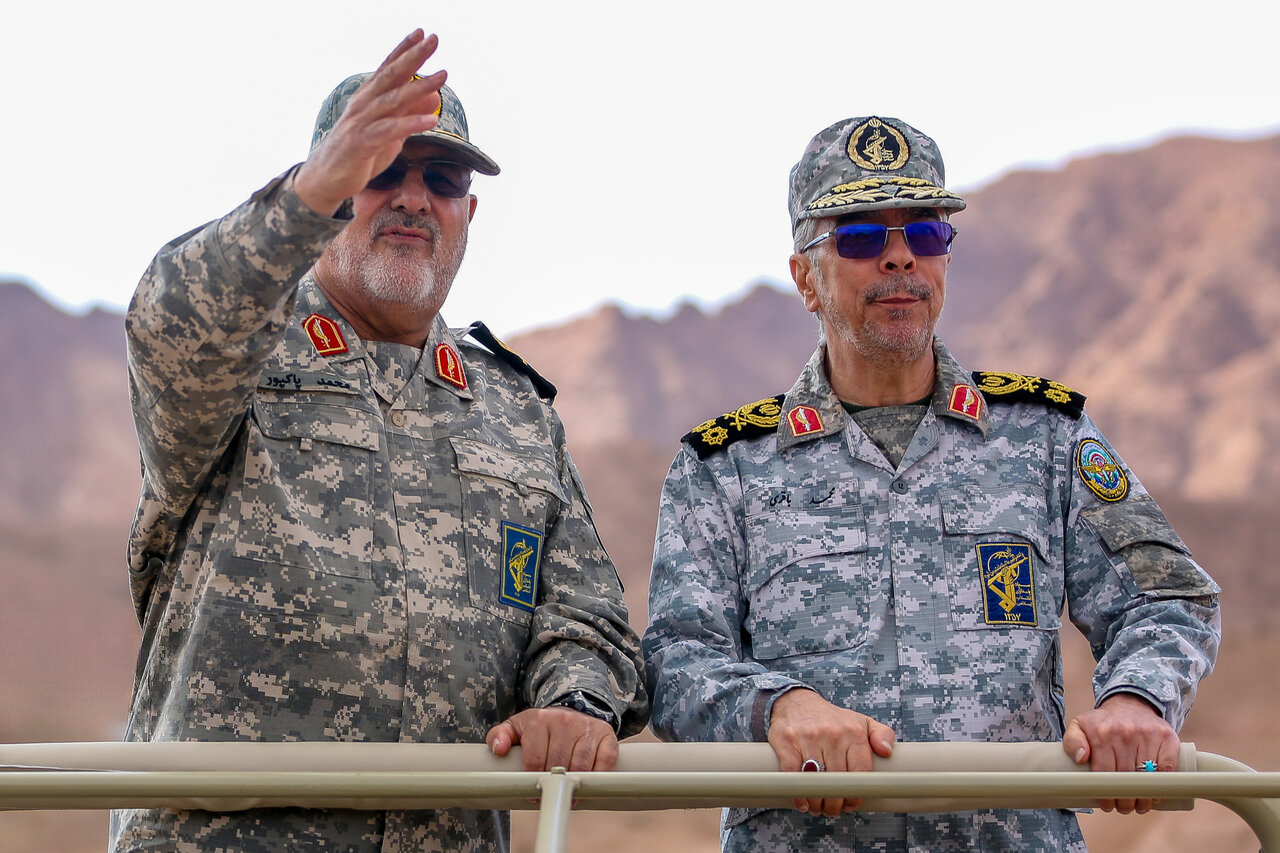
Islamic Revolutionary Guard Corps commanders in Kerman

Cryptocurrency in Iran has emerged as a pivotal response to economic pressures and global isolation. In 2026, Iran had a total US$7.8 billion cryptocurrency market, and a number of exchanges such as Nobitex. Iran's interest in cryptocurrencies began in 2017 when international sanctions obstructed Iran's access to the global financial markets. In 2019, the government legalized cryptocurrency mining under specific conditions. The country's cryptocurrency market has since faced challenges like high energy costs and the Islamic Revolutionary Guard Corps using cryptocurrency in illicit activities.

== Historical context ==
=== Market development ===
Iran's interest in cryptocurrencies has grown since 2017 when international sanctions severely obstructed Iran's access to the international financial system. This resulted in a growing reliance on Bitcoin and other digital currencies as alternative methods to bypass the sanctions. With inflation rates soaring, in subsequent years, many Iranians have turned to cryptocurrencies as a means of preserving wealth. Alongside more traditional assets such as gold and foreign currencies, Bitcoin and other digital currencies have gained popularity among citizens looking to protect their savings from the devaluation of the Iranian Rial.

=== Mining legalization and limitations ===
In April 2018, the Central Bank of the Islamic Republic of Iran issued a statement banning the country's banks and financial institutions from dealing with cryptocurrencies, citing money laundering and terrorism financing risks.

In 2018, Iran recognized cryptocurrency mining as a legal industry in order to monitor and regulate the mining farms that were already operating.

In 2019, the government legalized cryptocurrency mining under specific conditions. This decision was partly influenced by Iran's huge energy resources, which made mining lucrative despite the fact that digital currencies mining is energy-intensive. However, Iran's power grid is both fragile and costly to maintain, with frequent outages and a loss of about 13% of electricity during transmission. Licensed miners must pay premium rates for electricity, pushing many to abandon legal operations for underground, unlicensed mining. As a result, Iran's share in global Bitcoin mining decreased from 4.5% in 2021 to around 3.1% in 2024.

=== Central Bank of Iran's blockchain projects ===
In recent years, the Central Bank of Iran has shown a growing interest in blockchain technology. Notably, the development of the Borna blockchain platform was launched in conjunction with Areatak, an Iranian blockchain solutions provider, to create a digital framework for Iran's banking and financial sectors. This project, along with the Kuknos Network, reflects the government's efforts to capitalize on blockchain technologies while maintaining strict control over digital assets.

=== The IRGC in Iran's cryptocurrency market ===
International sanctions have significantly limited Iran's access to global financial markets, pushing state-linked entities such as the IRGC to find alternative channels for transactions. Cryptocurrencies, particularly Bitcoin, have provided the IRGC with an effective way to bypass traditional banking restrictions and move money across borders.

The decentralized nature of cryptocurrencies makes them difficult to trace, allowing the IRGC and affiliated groups to use them for sanction evasion and illicit activities. In 2022, the U.S. Treasury's Office of Foreign Assets Control (OFAC) sanctioned Amir Hossein Nikaeen Ravari and Ahmad Khatibi Aghada, both Iranians linked to the IRGC, for allegedly funneling funds into Iran through local cryptocurrency exchanges.

In 2025, wallets associated with the Guards were funded with over $3 billion in cryptocurrencies, representing over half of Iran's cryptocurrency flows. In early 2026, the Financial Times reported that Iran accepted cryptocurrency in sales of weapons systems. The Revolutionary Guards and Iranian central bank, according to France24 in March 2026, preferred stablecoins, while bitcoin was popular with Iranian civilians.

=== 2024-2025: Regulation changes ===
On December 27th 2024 Iranian regime's Central Bank's new program effectively blocked all Iranian cryptocurrency to rial and vice versa payments through internet websites in Iran. In January 2025 the central bank began unblocking cryptomoney to fiat traders exchanges with their own government API for full access to user data. In December 2025, the Iranian regime globally banned any and all transaction and transfer of cryptocurrency and along with gold.

=== 2025-2026: Nobitex hack and use during air strikes ===
On June 18, 2025, it was reported that a group called Gonjeshke Darande (also called "Predatory Sparrow") stole $90 million in digital assets from the Iranian Nobitex cryptocurrency exchange. Gonjeshke Darande, which may have links to Israel, appears to have been motivated by Israeli missile attacks on Iran several days prior. The funds were in effect "burned" by being transferred to addresses which the hackers did not have cryptographic keys.

On March 4, 2026, the analytics firms Chainalysis and Elliptic reported that there had been sharp outflow increases from Iranian crypto exchanges after US and Israeli air strikes. Around $10 million left Iranian platforms between February 28 and March 2, and by March 5, two-thirds of those funds were transferred to foreign exchanges. The reports described the amounts as "paltry" relative to the country's total $7.8 billion cryptocurrency market.

== Regulations ==
=== Mining regulations ===
Iran legalized cryptocurrency mining in 2019, recognizing the potential for revenue generation amidst economic sanctions. However, the legalization came with heavy regulations, including requiring miners to sell their digital assets directly to the Central Bank of Iran (CBI). Licensed miners are also subjected to high energy tariffs, which have made mining financially unsustainable for many. This has led a significant portion of Iran's mining activities to go underground.

=== Exchanges and transactional controls ===
Iranian cryptocurrency exchanges such as Nobitex have been increasingly popular among citizens. However, these exchanges operate under stringent regulations. The Central Bank prohibits the use of foreign-mined cryptocurrencies for domestic transactions, reinforcing government control over the digital currency market. Despite these measures, many Iranians utilize virtual private networks (VPNs) to access foreign exchanges, circumventing local restrictions and avoiding scrutiny.

== See also ==
- Economy of Iran
- Electronic currency in Iran
- International sanctions against Iran
- Virtual currency law in Iran
