= Billion cubic metres of natural gas =

Measure of natural gas

Billion cubic metres of natural gas (non SI abbreviation: bcm) is a measure of natural gas production and trade. Some definitions cite volume, others energy content.

Dependant of implied standards, this measure may represent different value of energy content. According to the standard defined by the International Energy Agency, it corresponds in average to 38.2 petajoules (1.06×10^{10} kWh) of energy in the case of Russian natural gas and 41.4 petajoules (1.15×10^{10} kWh) of energy in the case of Qatar's natural gas.

== Volume based definitions ==
According to the standard defined by the International Energy Agency, the gas physical volume is used, which is measured at the temperature of 15 °C (59 °F) at atmospheric pressure. According to the Russian standard, the gas volume is measured at 20 °C (68 °F). That means that 1 billion cubic metres of natural gas by the International Energy Agency standard is equivalent to 1.017 billion cubic metres of natural gas by the Russian standard.

== Energy based definitions ==
Some other organizations use energy equivalent-based standards. BP uses a standard which is equivalent to 36 petajoules (1.0×10^{10} kWh) per billion cubic metres. Cedigaz uses a standard which is equivalent to 40 petajoules (1.1×10^{10} kWh) per billion cubic metres.
