= 49th G7 summit =

2023 international leader meeting in Japan

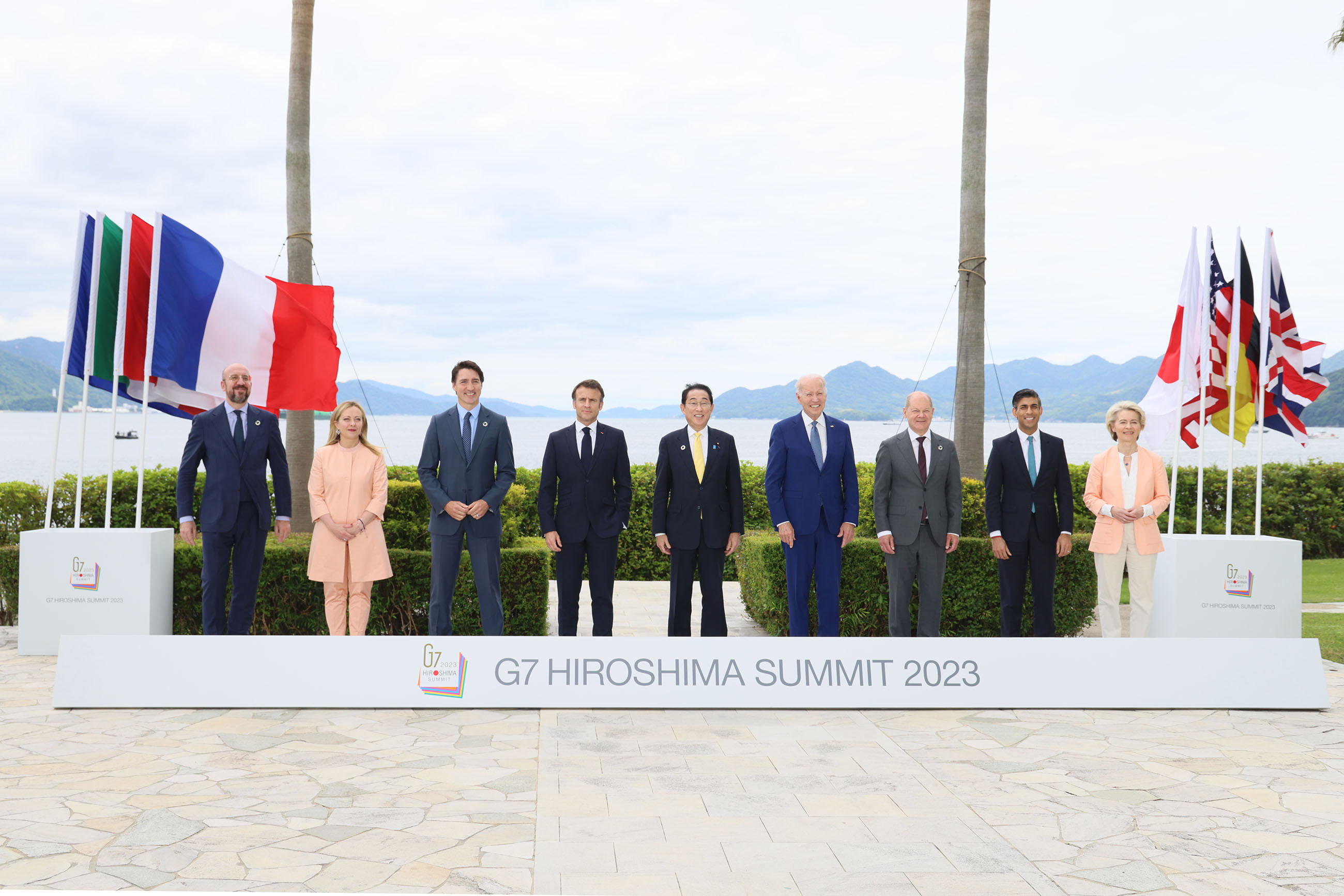
- Host country: Japan
- Date: 19–21 May 2023
- Cities: Hiroshima
- Venues: Grand Prince Hotel Hiroshima
- Participants: Canada; France; Germany; Italy; Japan; United Kingdom; United States; European Union; Invited countries: Australia; Brazil; Comoros; Cook Islands; India; Indonesia; South Korea; Vietnam; Guest: Ukraine
- Follows: 48th G7 summit
- Precedes: 50th G7 summit
- Website: www.g7hiroshima.go.jp/en/

The 49th G7 summit was held from 19 to 21 May 2023 in the city of Hiroshima in Hiroshima Prefecture.

Leaders of G7 countries joined in Hiroshima to discuss a number of challenges to peace and prosperity facing the global order while consulting with invited guests. The issues discussed included the Russian invasion of Ukraine and effects on the international order, climate change, the COVID-19 pandemic, and other geopolitical crises. To resolve these issues, the G7 pledged to uphold the free and open international order based on "the rule of law", and strengthened the G7's outreach to emerging and developing countries.

The long invitees list reflects attempts to influence the "Global South", a term used for developing countries in Asia, Africa and Latin America, all of which have complex political and economic ties to both Russia and China.

Many geopolitical commentators remarked that Ukrainian President Volodymyr Zelenskyy received much attention and dominated the summit, and that the Hiroshima summit achieved many objectives.

The leaders' communiqué featured commitments and statements on a range of topics including climate, health, food security, and technology. However, the Russian invasion of Ukraine, nuclear nonproliferation, and economic security were the most prominent. Other five standalone statements were issued.

In not one but two statements, the G7 made clear to China their stance on divisive geopolitical hot spots such as the Indo-Pacific and Taiwan, but the most important part of their message centered on what they called "economic coercion".

== Leaders at the summit ==
=== Background ===
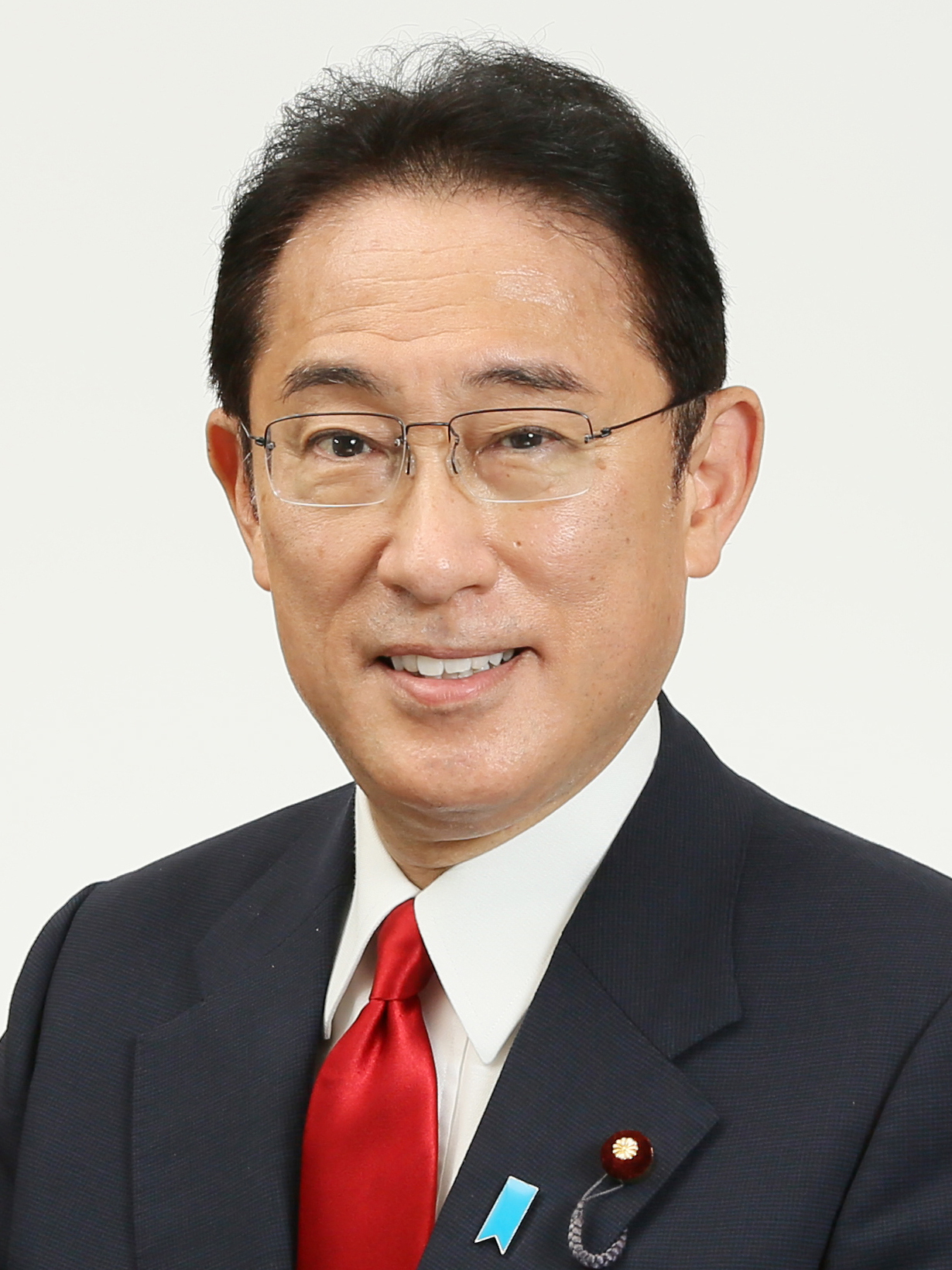
Fumio Kishida chaired the 49th G7 summit.

All G7 member states participated, including the representatives of the European Union. International organizations, such as the United Nations (UN) and World Trade Organization (WTO) were also in attendance.

Following Russia's invasion of Ukraine in February 2022, G7 member states heavily sanctioned Russia, which was a member until 2014, with some arming the Ukrainian military with weapons. Ukrainian President Volodymyr Zelenskyy was invited to a virtual summit meeting of G7 leaders, which was held on 24 February 2023, the first anniversary of the Russian invasion of Ukraine.

Japan held the presidency of the G7 for 2023, and in an attempt to reach to the "Global South" of nations, Japanese Prime Minister Fumio Kishida invited the leaders of Australia, Brazil, Comoros, Cook Islands, India, Indonesia, South Korea, and Vietnam. All nations accepted the invitations, with India hosting the 2023 G20 New Delhi summit.

The 2023 summit was the first summit for British Prime Minister Rishi Sunak and Italian Prime Minister Giorgia Meloni.

=== Participants and representatives ===
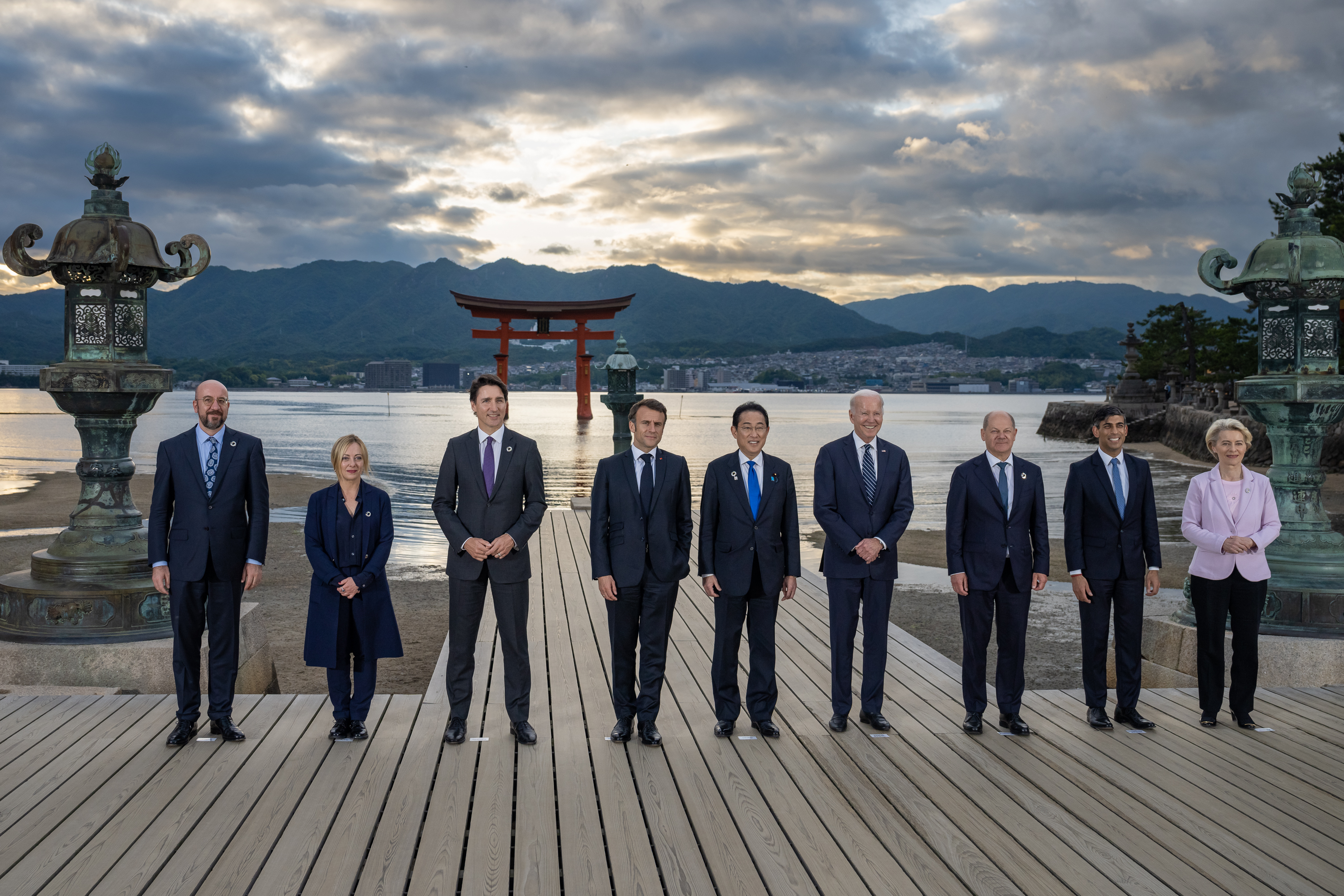
G7 leaders at the summit

Promotional video.

Core G7 Members The host state and leader are shown in bold text.
Member		Represented by	Title
(Canada)	Canada	Justin Trudeau	Prime Minister
(France)	France	Emmanuel Macron	President
(Germany)	Germany	Olaf Scholz	Chancellor
(Italy)	Italy	Giorgia Meloni (Gianluigi Benedetti)	Prime Minister (Ambassador of Italy to Japan)
(Japan)	**Japan (Host)**	**Fumio Kishida**	**Prime Minister**
(United Kingdom)	United Kingdom	Rishi Sunak	Prime Minister
(United States)	United States	Joe Biden	President
(European Union)	European Union	Ursula von der Leyen	Commission President
(European Union)	European Union	Charles Michel	Council President
**Invitees**
Countries		Represented by	Title
(Australia)	Australia	Anthony Albanese	Prime Minister
(Brazil)	Brazil	Luiz Inácio Lula da Silva	President
(Comoros)	Comoros	Azali Assoumani	President
(Cook Islands)	Cook Islands	Mark Brown	Prime Minister
(India)	India	Narendra Modi	Prime Minister
(Indonesia)	Indonesia	Joko Widodo	President
(South Korea)	South Korea	Yoon Suk Yeol	President
(Vietnam)	Vietnam	Phạm Minh Chính	Prime Minister
International organizations		Represented by	Title
	International Energy Agency	Fatih Birol	Executive Director
(International Monetary Fund)	International Monetary Fund	Kristalina Georgieva	managing director
	OECD	Mathias Cormann	Secretary-General
(United Nations)	United Nations	António Guterres	Secretary-General
	World Bank	David Malpass	President
(World Health Organization)	World Health Organization	Tedros Adhanom Ghebreyesus (virtually present)	Director-General
(World Trade Organization)	World Trade Organization	Ngozi Okonjo-Iweala	Director-General
**Guest**
Country		Represented by	Title
(Ukraine)	Ukraine	Volodymyr Zelenskyy	President

== Gallery of participating leaders ==
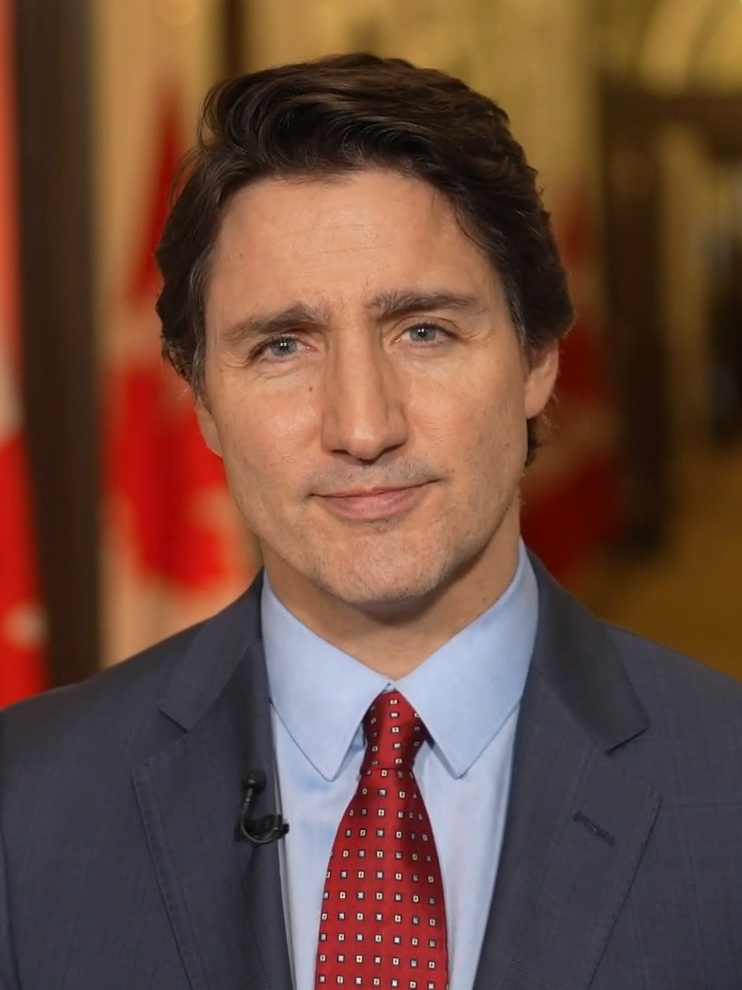
Canada
Justin Trudeau,
Prime Minister

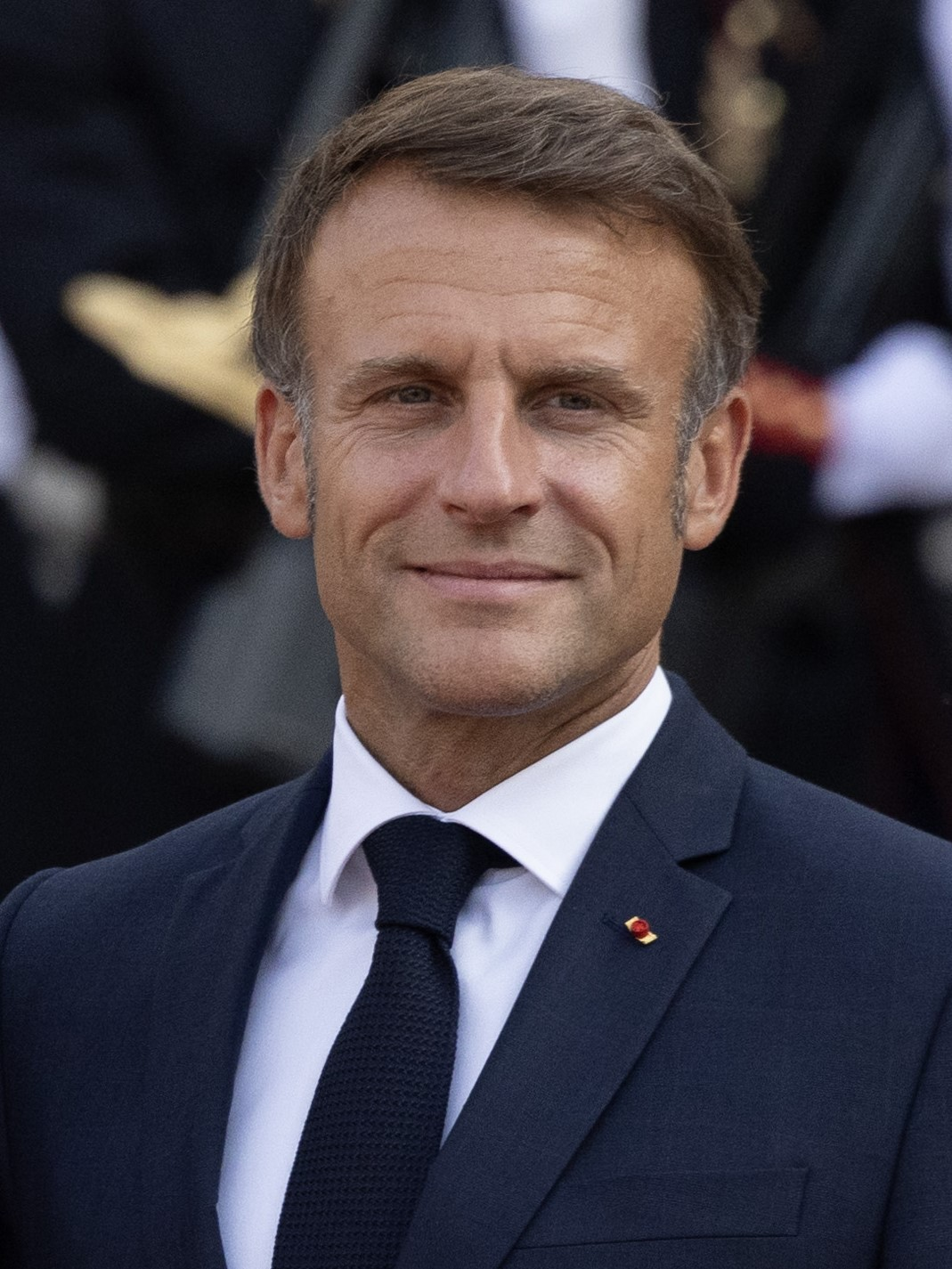
France
Emmanuel Macron,
President

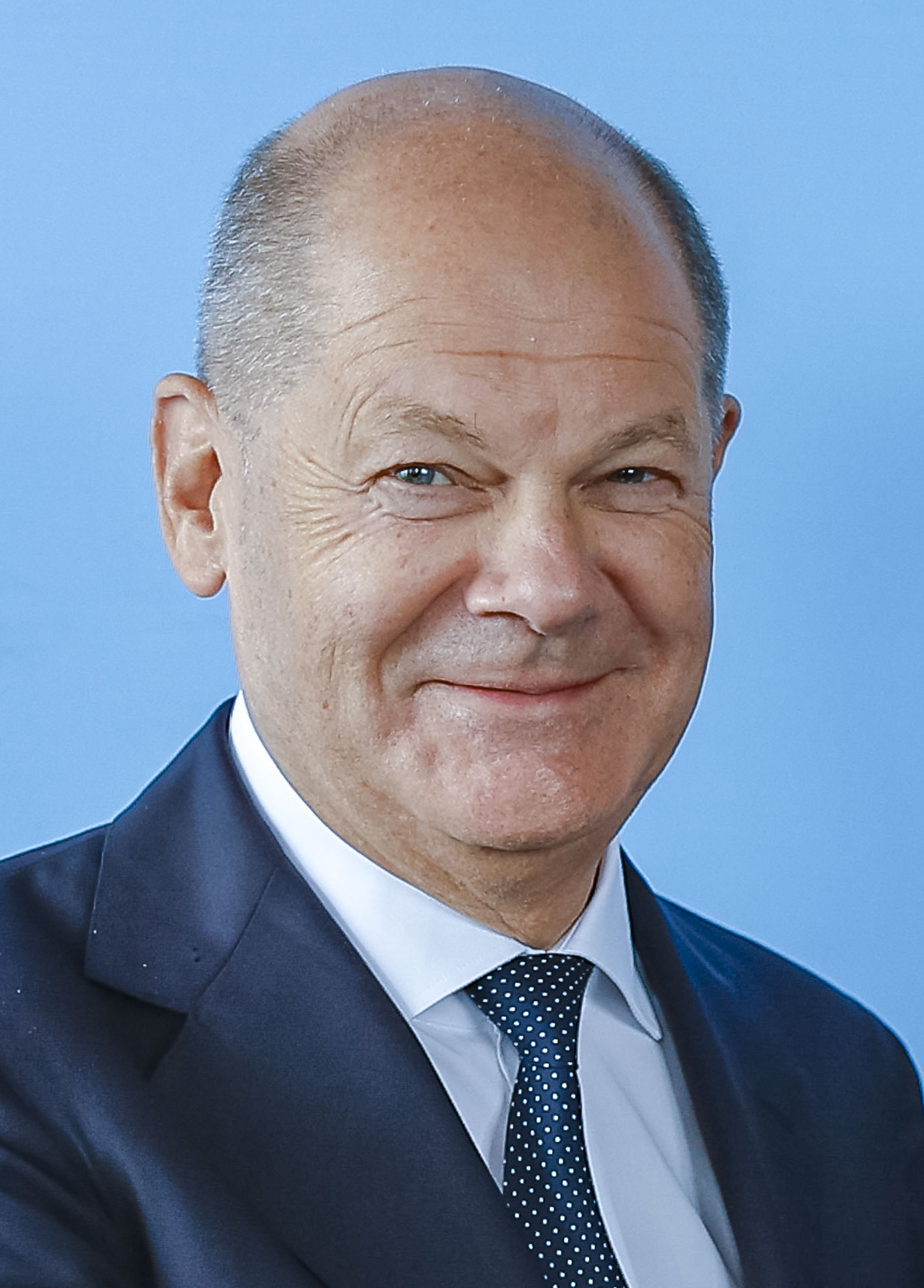
Germany
Olaf Scholz,
Chancellor

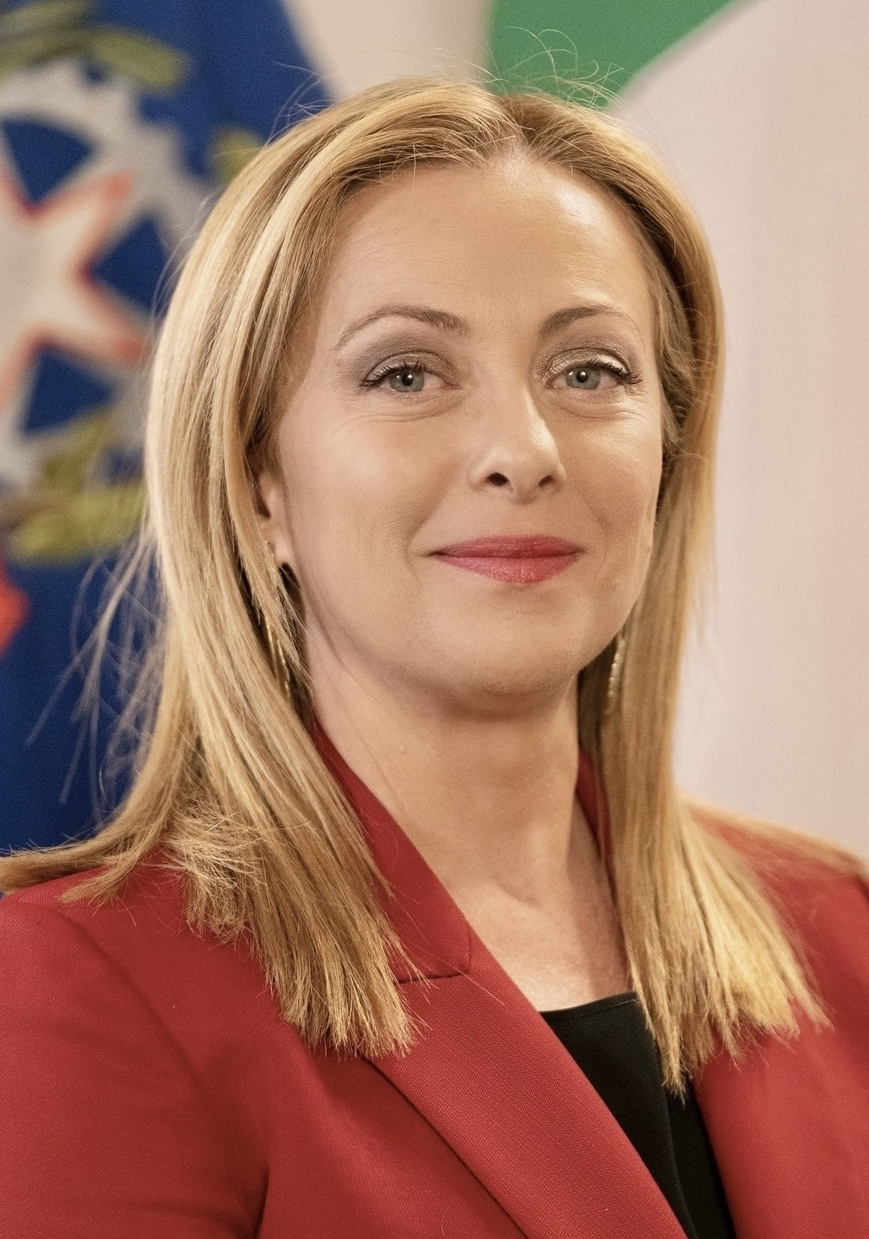
Italy
Giorgia Meloni,
Prime Minister

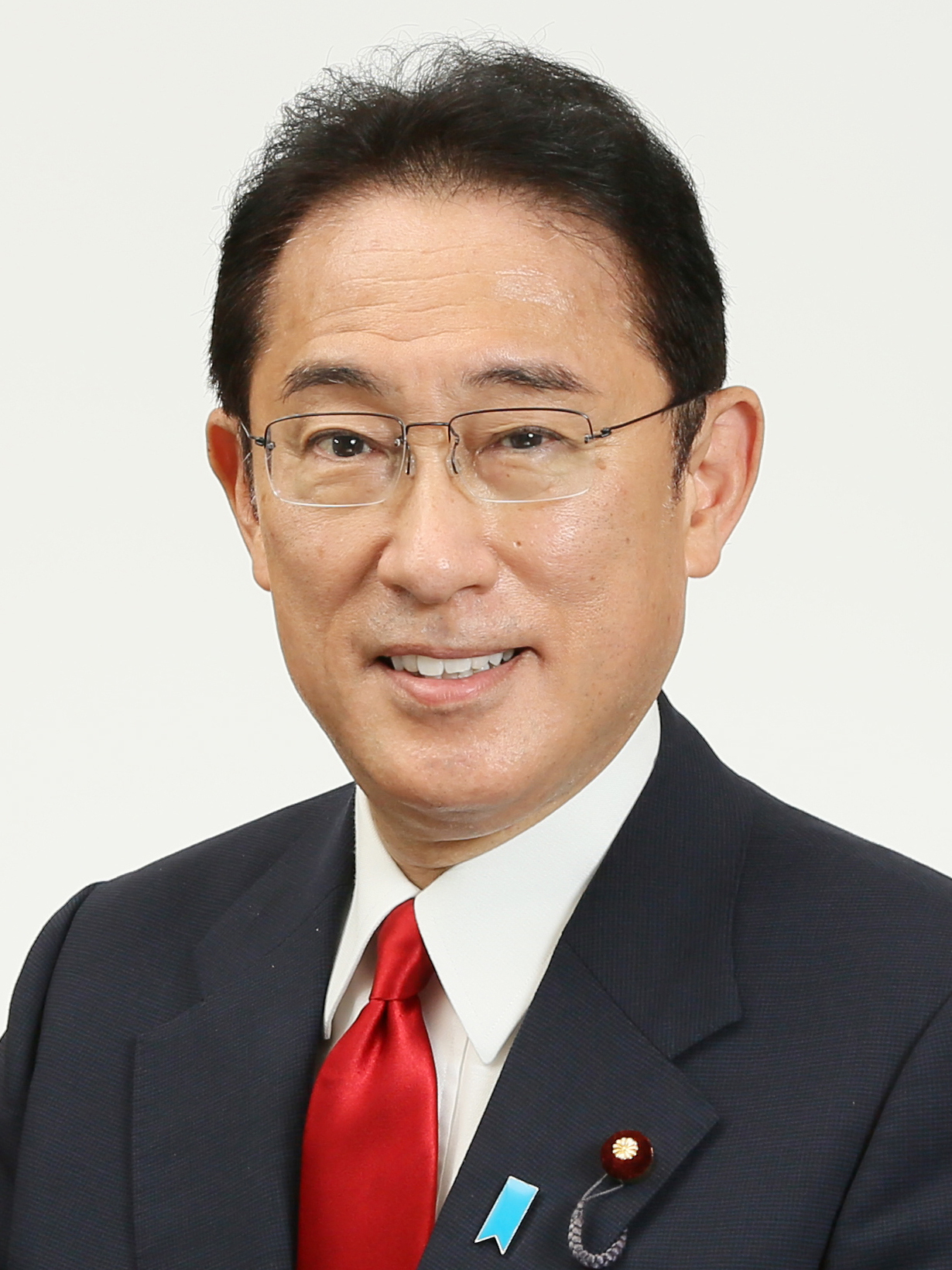
Japan
Fumio Kishida,
Prime Minister (Host)

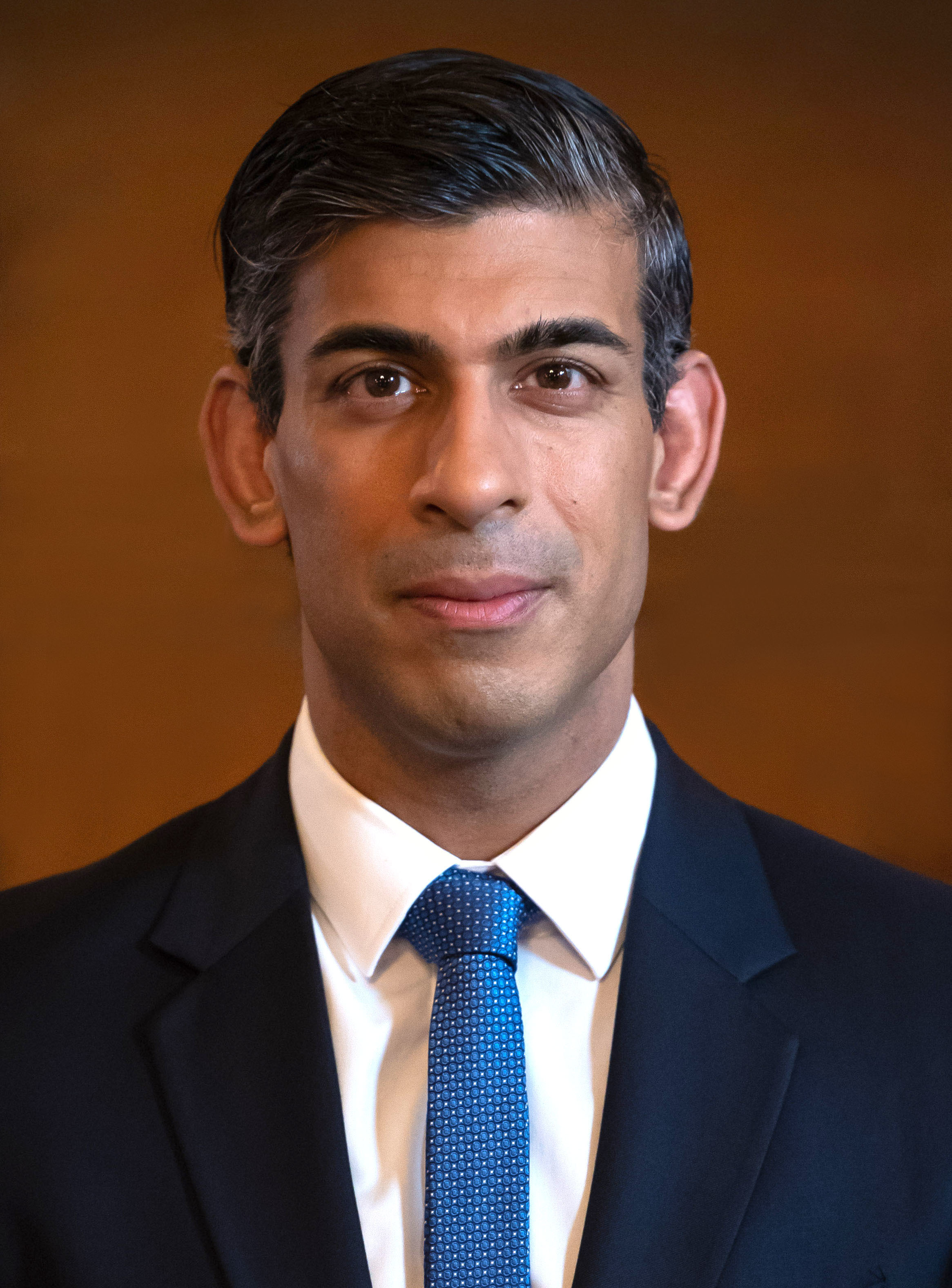
United Kingdom
Rishi Sunak,
Prime Minister

United States
Joe Biden,
President
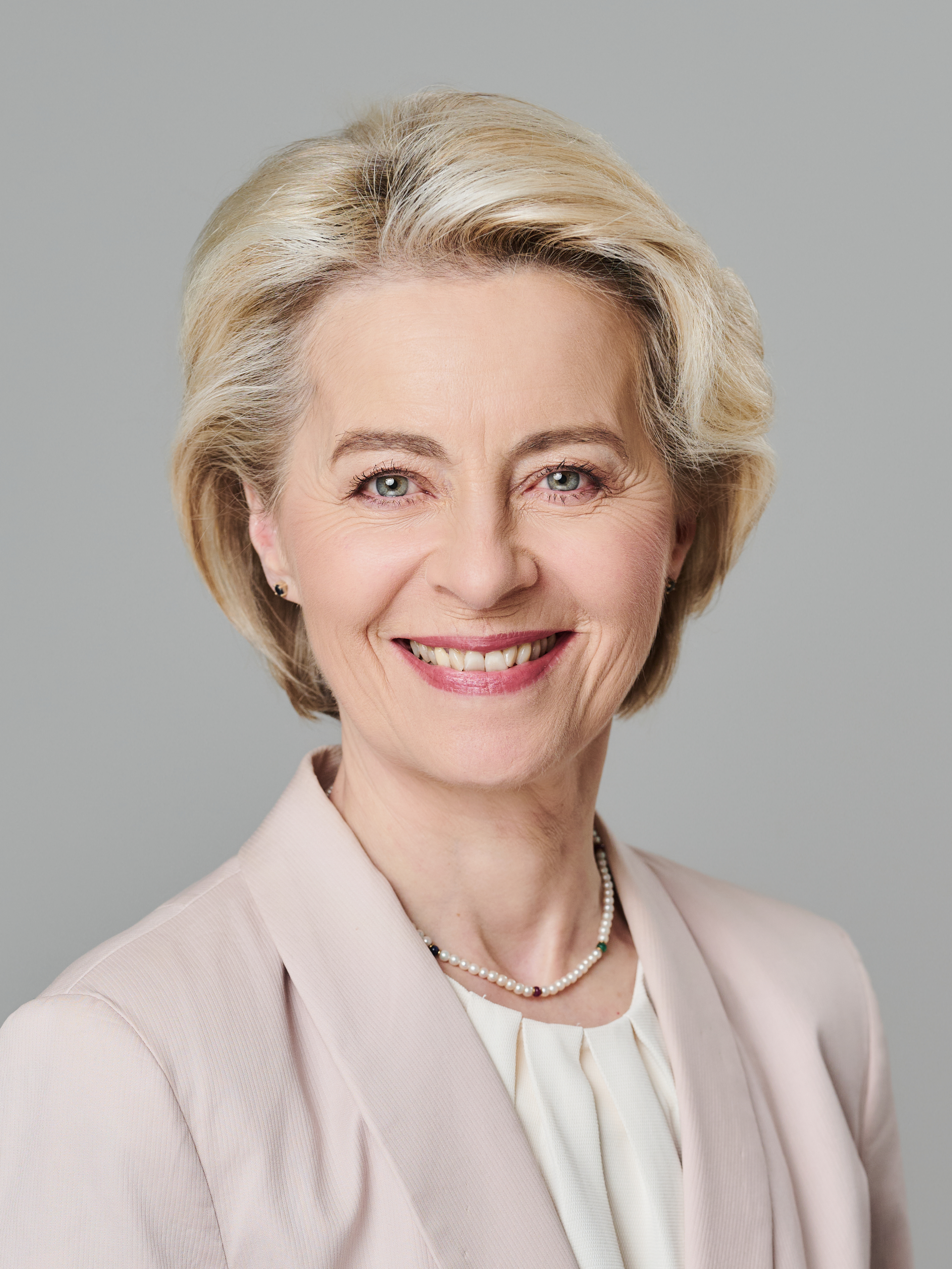
European Union
Ursula von der Leyen,
President of the European Commission

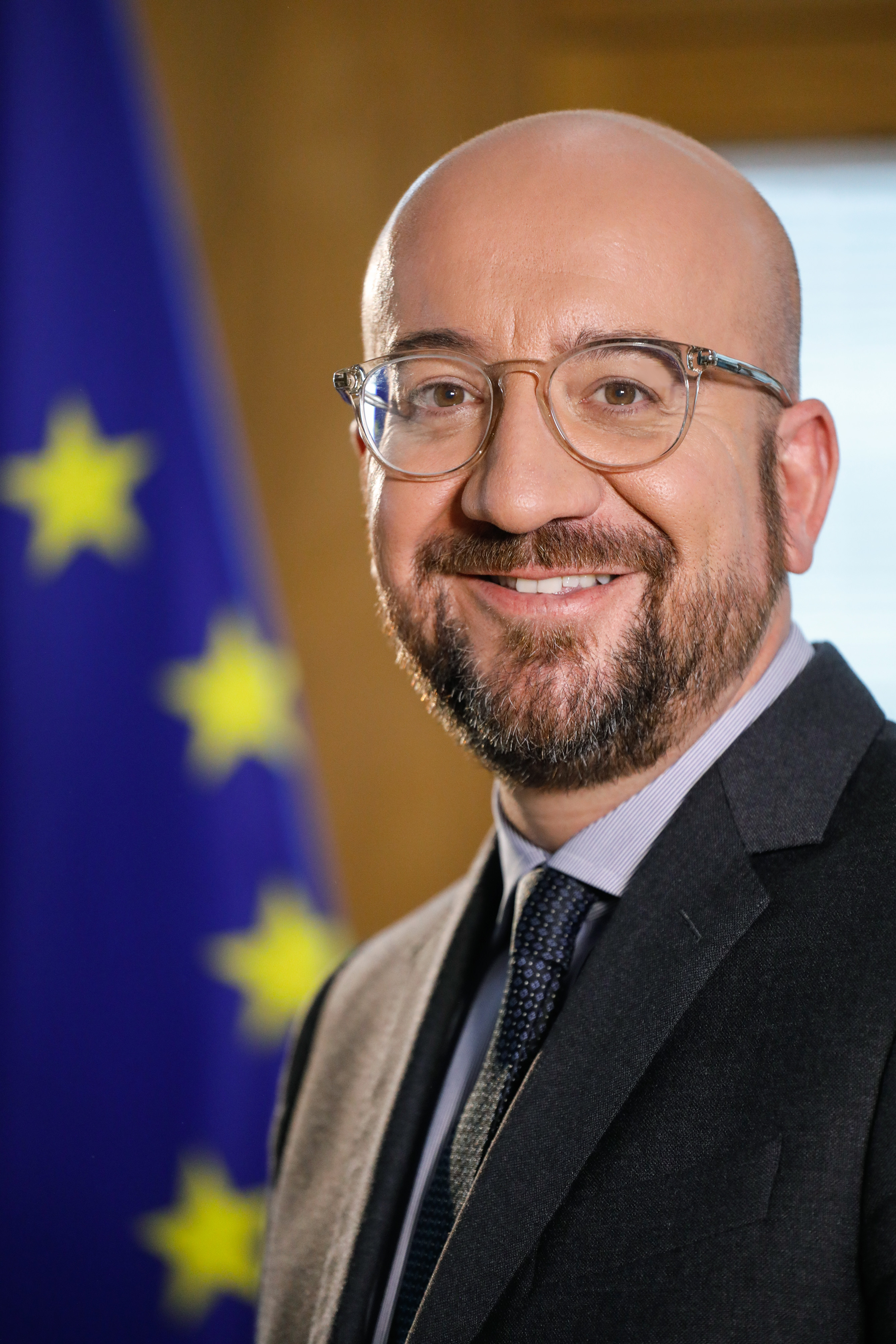
European Union
Charles Michel,
President of the European Council

== Invited leaders ==
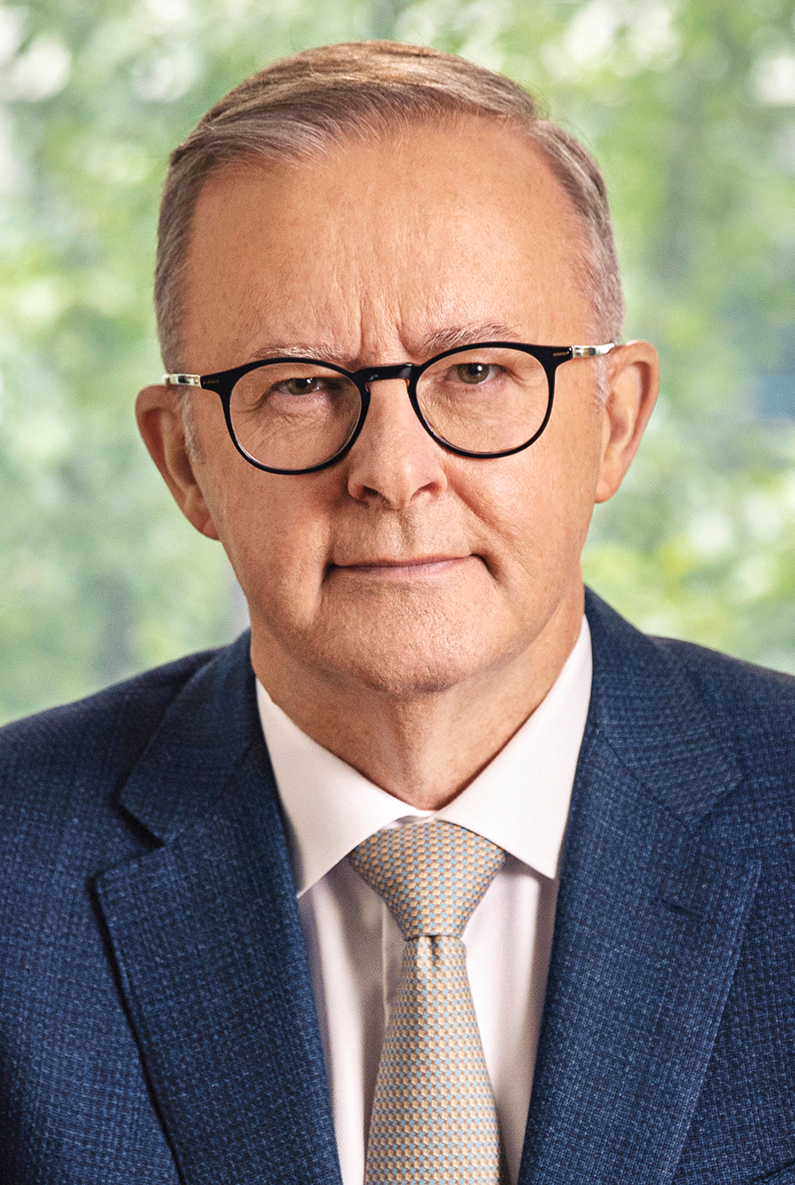
Australia
Anthony Albanese, Prime Minister
The host of 2023 Quadrilateral Security Dialogue (Quad)

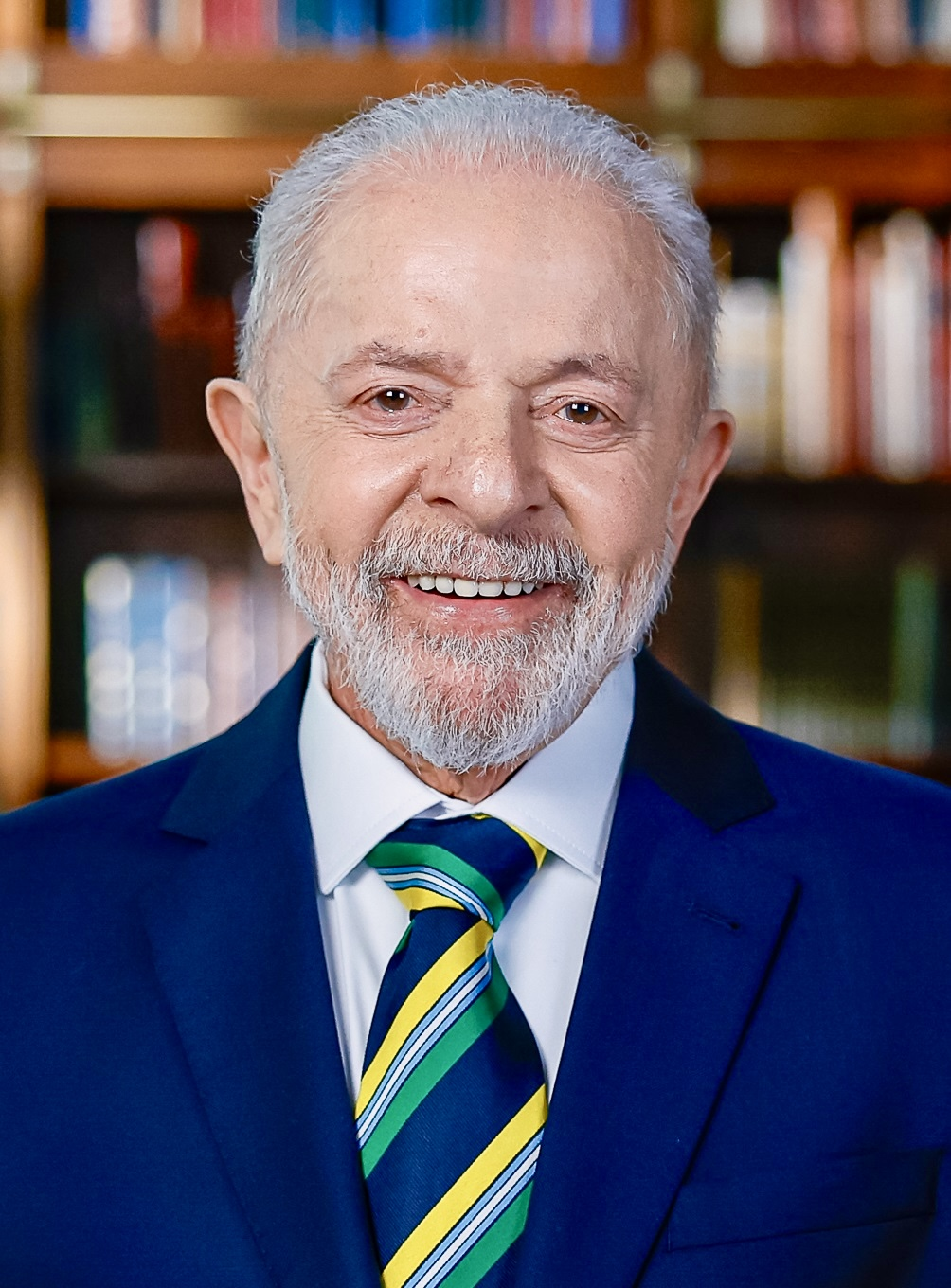
Brazil
Luiz Inácio Lula da Silva, President
2023 Chairperson of the Amazon Cooperation Treaty Organization (ACTO)

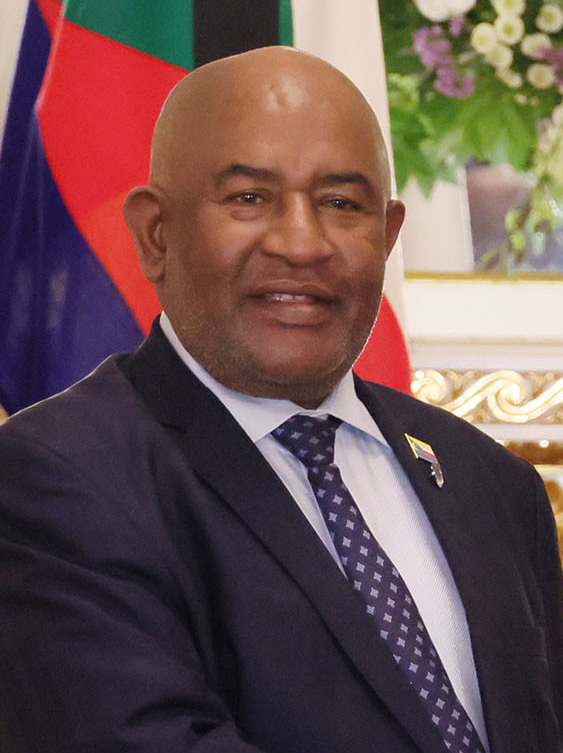
Comoros
Azali Assoumani, President
2023 Chairperson of the African Union

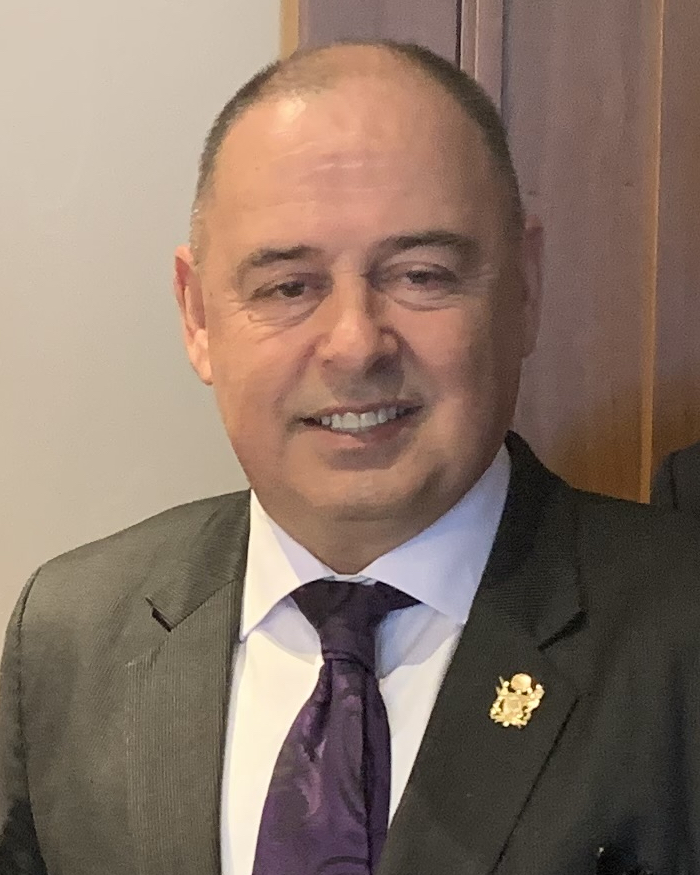
Cook Islands
Mark Brown, Prime Minister
2023 Chairperson of the Pacific Islands Forum

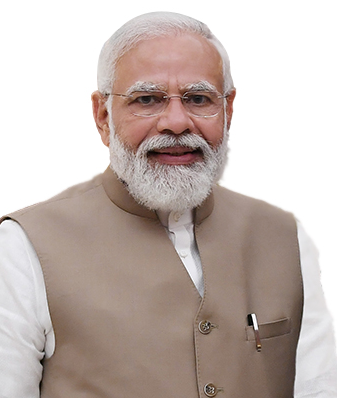
India
Narendra Modi, Prime Minister
The host of 2023 G20 New Delhi summit

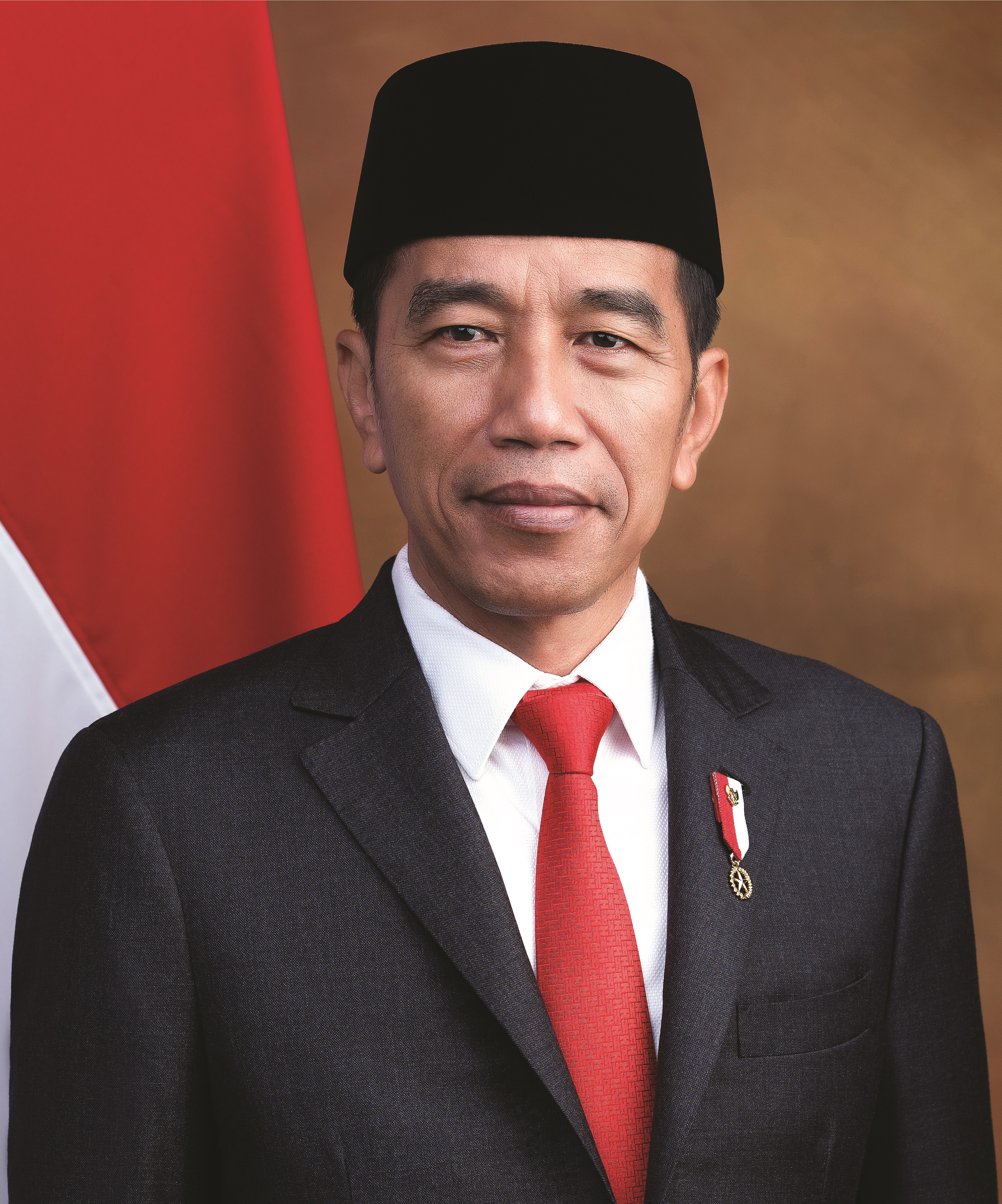
Indonesia
Joko Widodo, President
2023 Chairperson of ASEAN

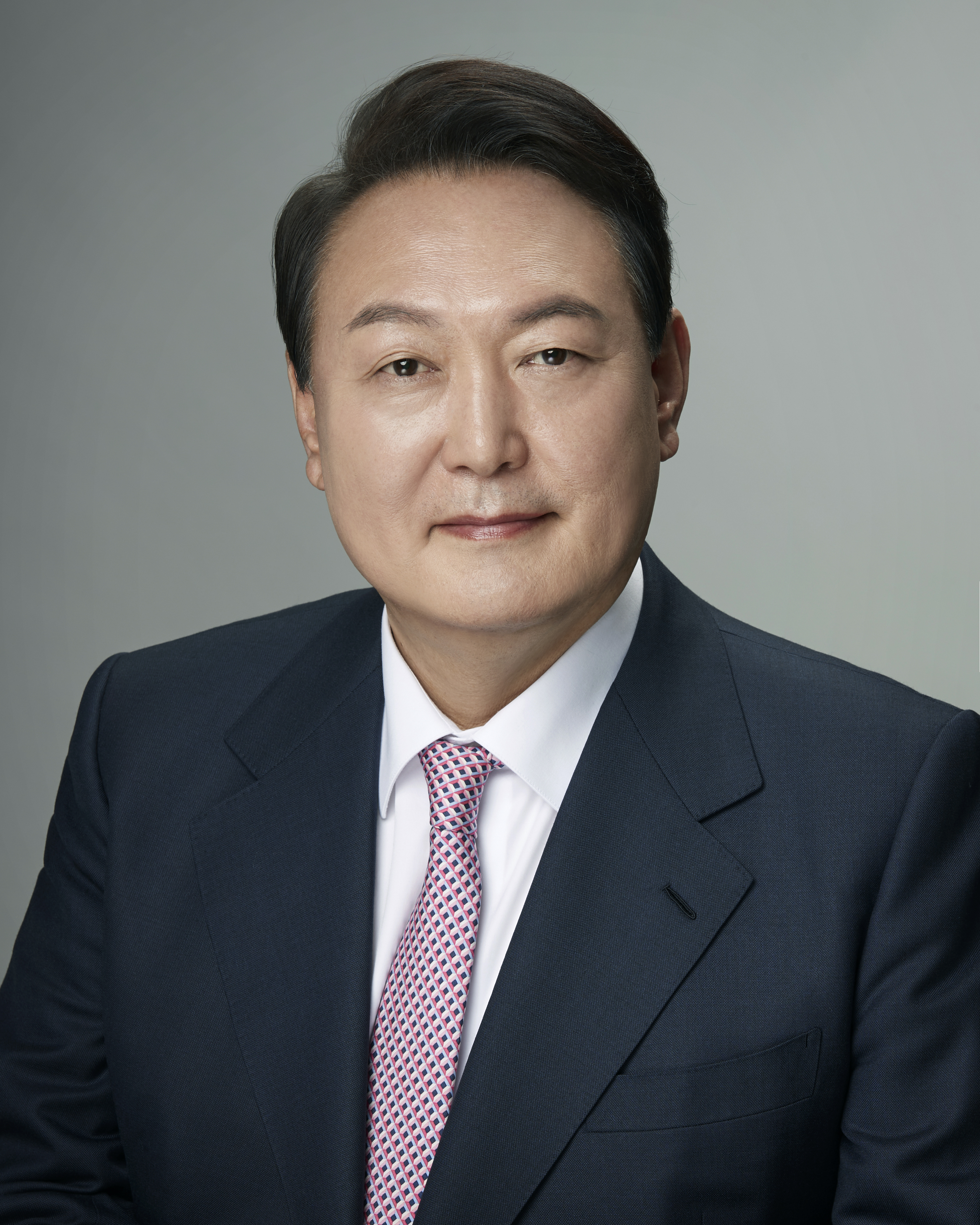
South Korea
Yoon Suk-yeol, President

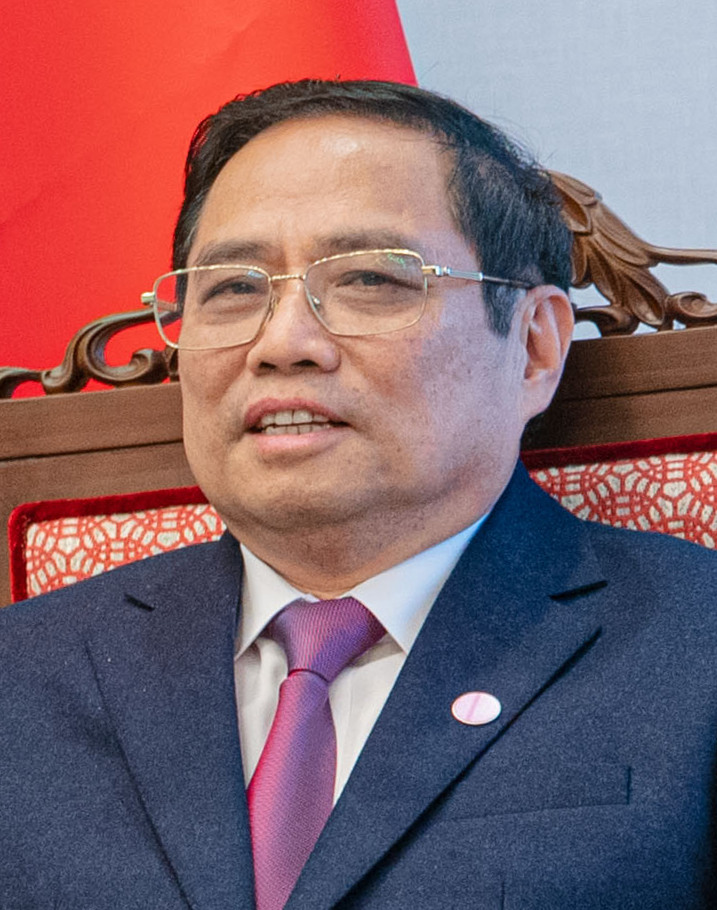
Vietnam
Phạm Minh Chính, Prime Minister

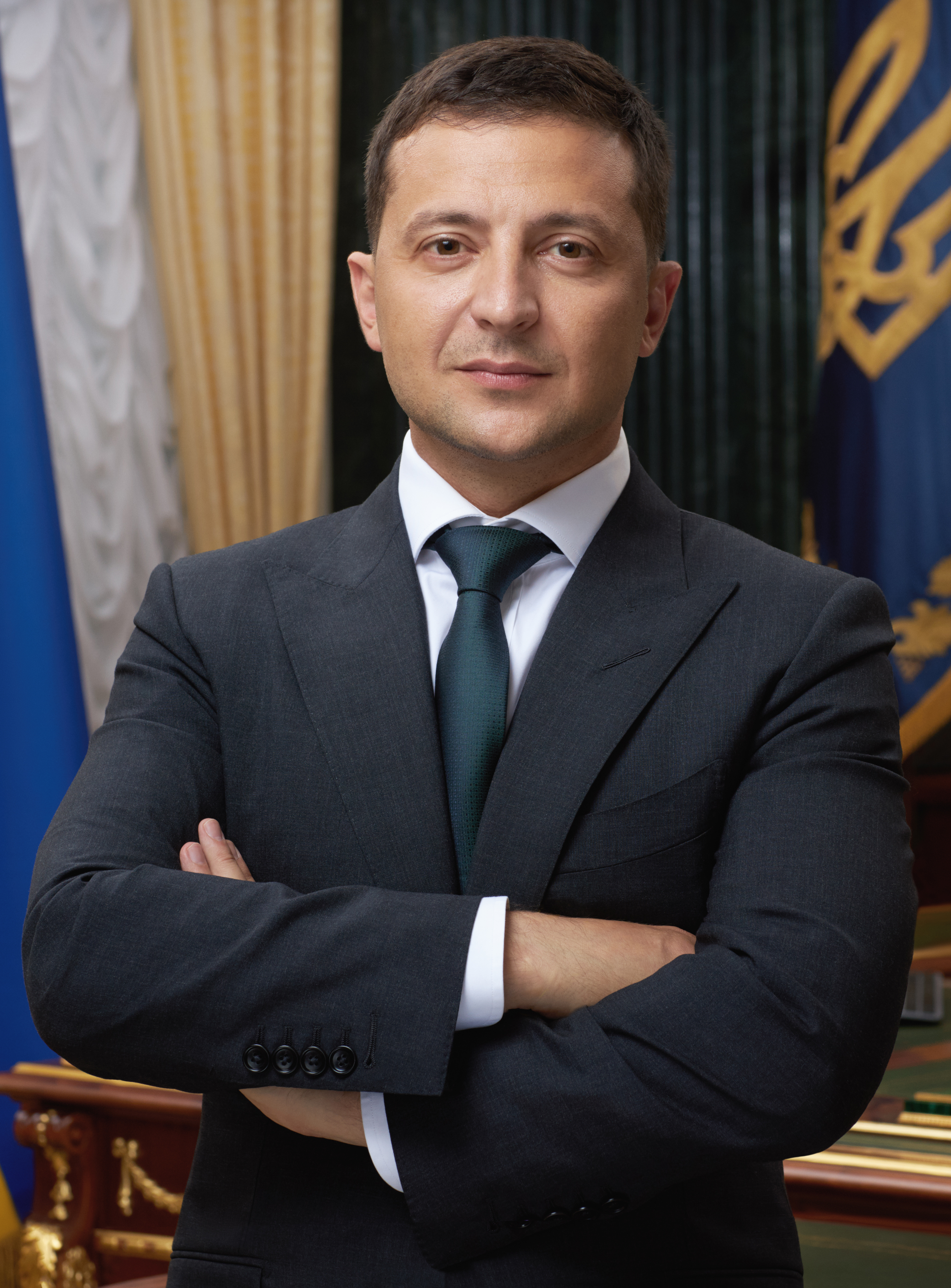
"Guest"
Ukraine
Volodymyr Zelenskyy, President

== Schedule and agenda ==
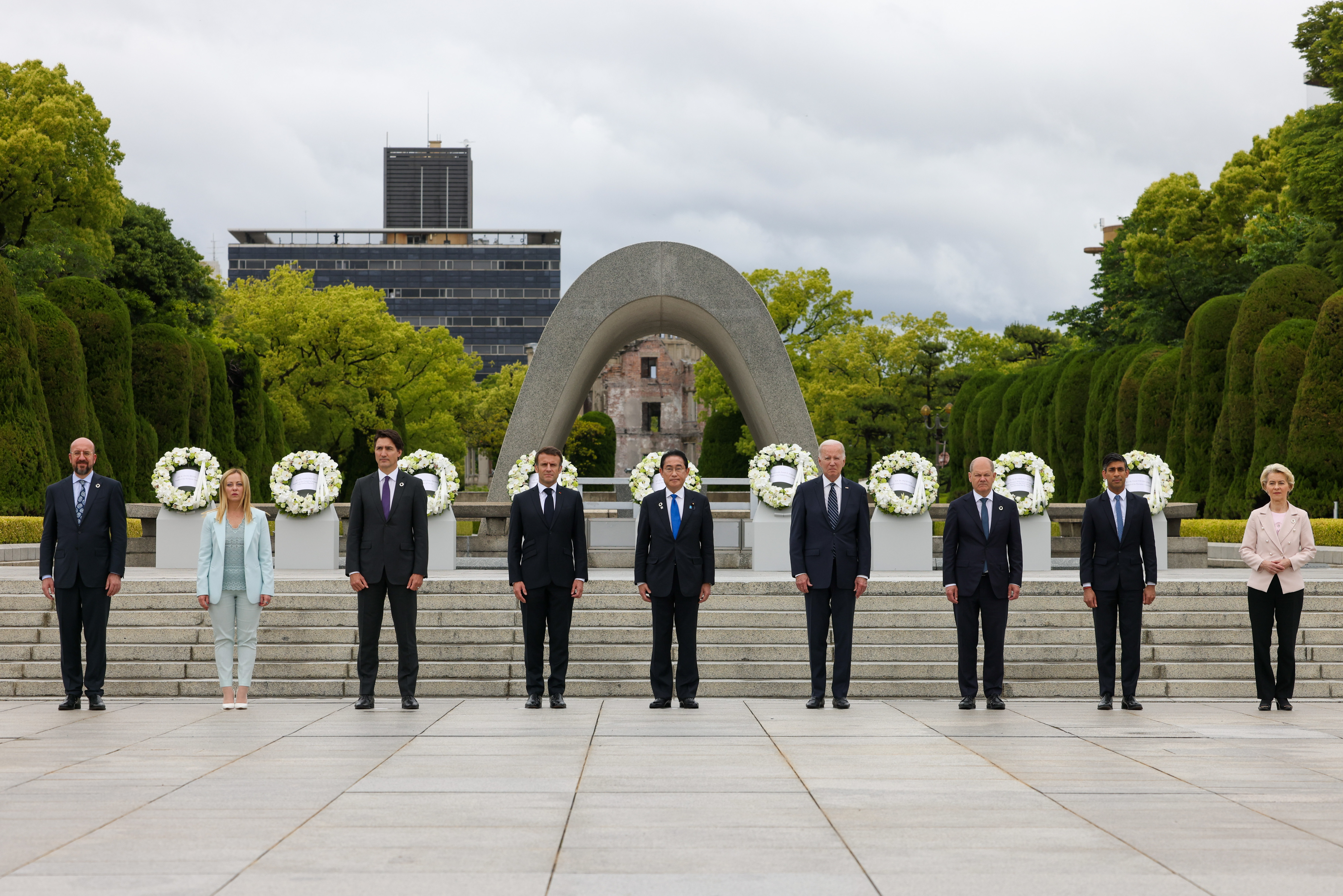
Leaders at the Hiroshima Peace Memorial, 19 May 2023.

=== 19 May 2023 ===
- Visit to Hiroshima Peace Memorial Park
  Japanese Prime Minister Kishida welcomed G7 leaders at Hiroshima Peace Memorial Park, and kicked off the three-day summit. The leaders observed "Memorial Museum for Soldiers, Detainees in Siberia, and Postwar Repatriates", and attended two ceremonies, Wreath-Laying Ceremony at the Cenotaph for the Atomic Bomb Victims and Tree-Planting Ceremony.
- Session 1 (working lunch): Toward an International Community Characterized by Cooperation, not Division and Confrontation / Global Economy
1. The G7 leaders agreed on the importance of setting two pillars, "upholding the free and open international order based on the rule of law" and strengthening outreach with international partners beyond the G7.
2. Regarding global economy: The G7 leaders concurred on the importance of close coordination among the G7 as well as the cooperation with international partners towards transition to clean energy economy, reduction of dependency on specific countries, and the making of reliable supply chains.
3. Regarding digital: The leaders will have ministers in charge discuss generative AI as "Hiroshima AI process", and have them report the results before the end of this year. It is reported that G7 leaders called for the formulation of "guardrails" around the development of artificial intelligence. And Japan asked for the G7's cooperation toward the early establishment of an international framework based on an agreement at the ministerial level to materialize Data Free Flow with Trust (DFFT).
4. Regarding trade: The G7 leaders concurred on the necessity to work toward maintaining and strengthening the free and fair trade system, including WTO reform.
- Session 2: Ukraine
  "G7 Leaders' Statement on Ukraine" which includes export control issues was issued.
- Move to Itsukushima and visit to Itsukushima Shrine
- Session 3 (working dinner): Foreign and Security Policy
1. The chair Kishida stated that it is essential to show the G7's strong will "to uphold the free and open international order based on the rule of law".
2. The G7 leaders reaffirmed that the G7 will continue to closely work together in responding to issues related to China as well as North Korea.
3. Regarding nuclear disarmament and non-proliferation: The G7's commitment to a "world without nuclear weapons" was reaffirmed, and "G7 Leaders' Hiroshima Vision on Nuclear Disarmament" was issued.

=== 20 May 2023 ===
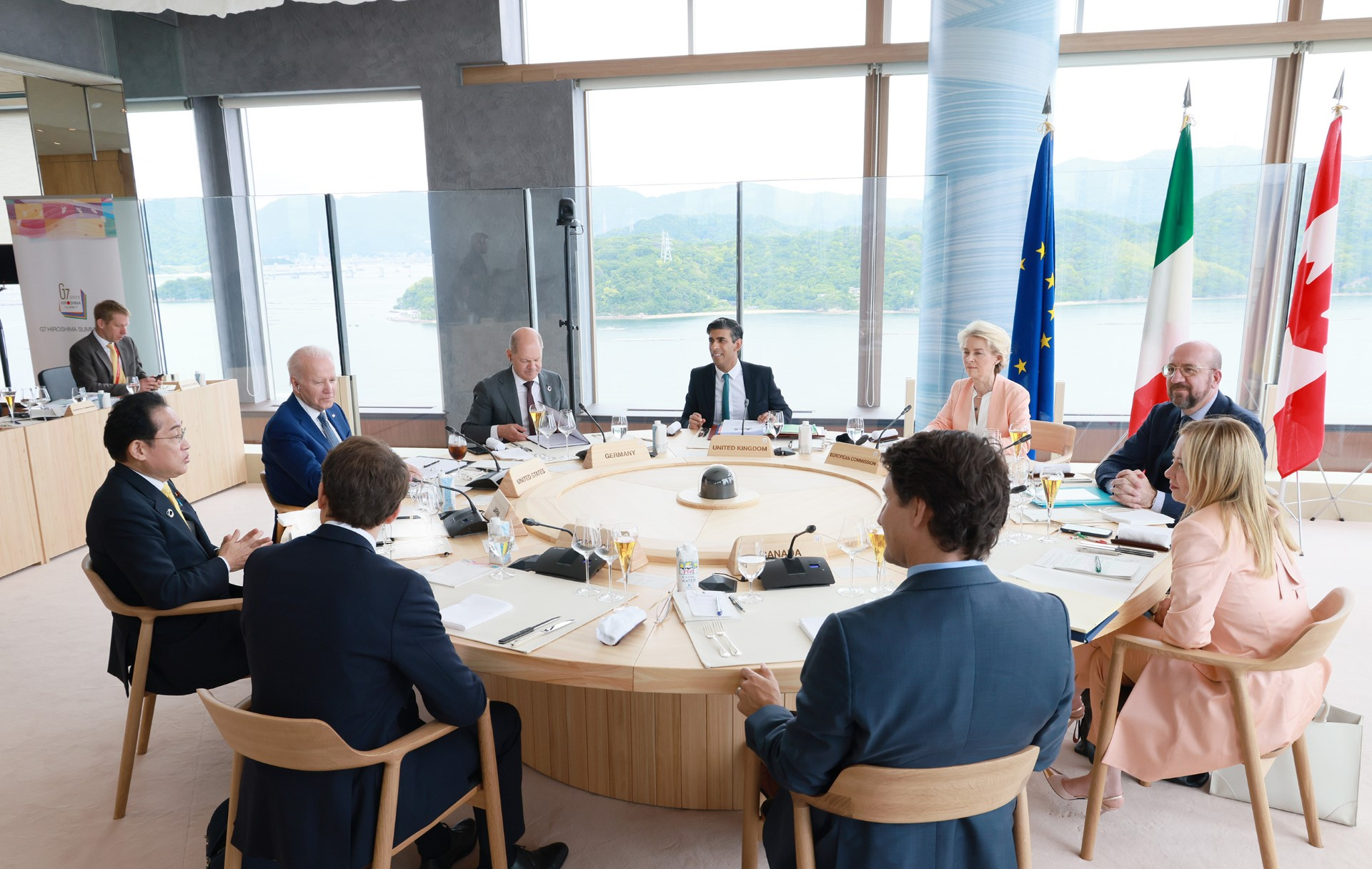
- Working session on 20 May 2023.
  Session 4: Strengthening engagement with partners
1. The chair Kishida discussed the importance of strengthening engagement with emerging and developing countries, including the global south, and to take an approach to respond carefully to various needs that those countries face.
2. Kishida stated his hope to support G20 on international issues such as food, development and health, and to connect the outcome of the G7 to the cooperation with the G20.
3. The G7 leaders agreed on the following items:
  1. Share the importance of the principles of the Charter of the United Nations and "the rule of law" that the international society should stand by with international partners
  2. Respond carefully to various needs of emerging and developing countries regarding challenges such as poverty, energy trandition and finance, by such means as establishment of value chains that enable developing countries to carry out processing locally, support through Partnership for Global Infrastructure and Investment (PGII), efforts to fill the development finance gap
  3. Support India on chairing 2023 G20 New Delhi summit
- Session 5 (working lunch): Economic resilience and economic security
1. Economic security was discussed for the first time as the agenda.
2. The G7 leaders affirmed that the G7 will be united in responding to the following issues:
  1. Enhancing resilience of supply chain and critical infrastructure
  2. Strengthening our response to non-market policy and practice and economic coercion
  3. Appropriately managing critical and emerging technologies
3. The G7 Leaders also discussed on the opportunities and challenges that AI brings.
4. Based on the discussion, "G7 Leaders' Statement on Economic Resilience and Economic Security" was issued.
5. Based on the discussion, "Clean Energy Economic Action Plan" was also issued.
- Meet and join with the outreach countries and international organizations
- Session 6: Working Together to Address Multiple Crises
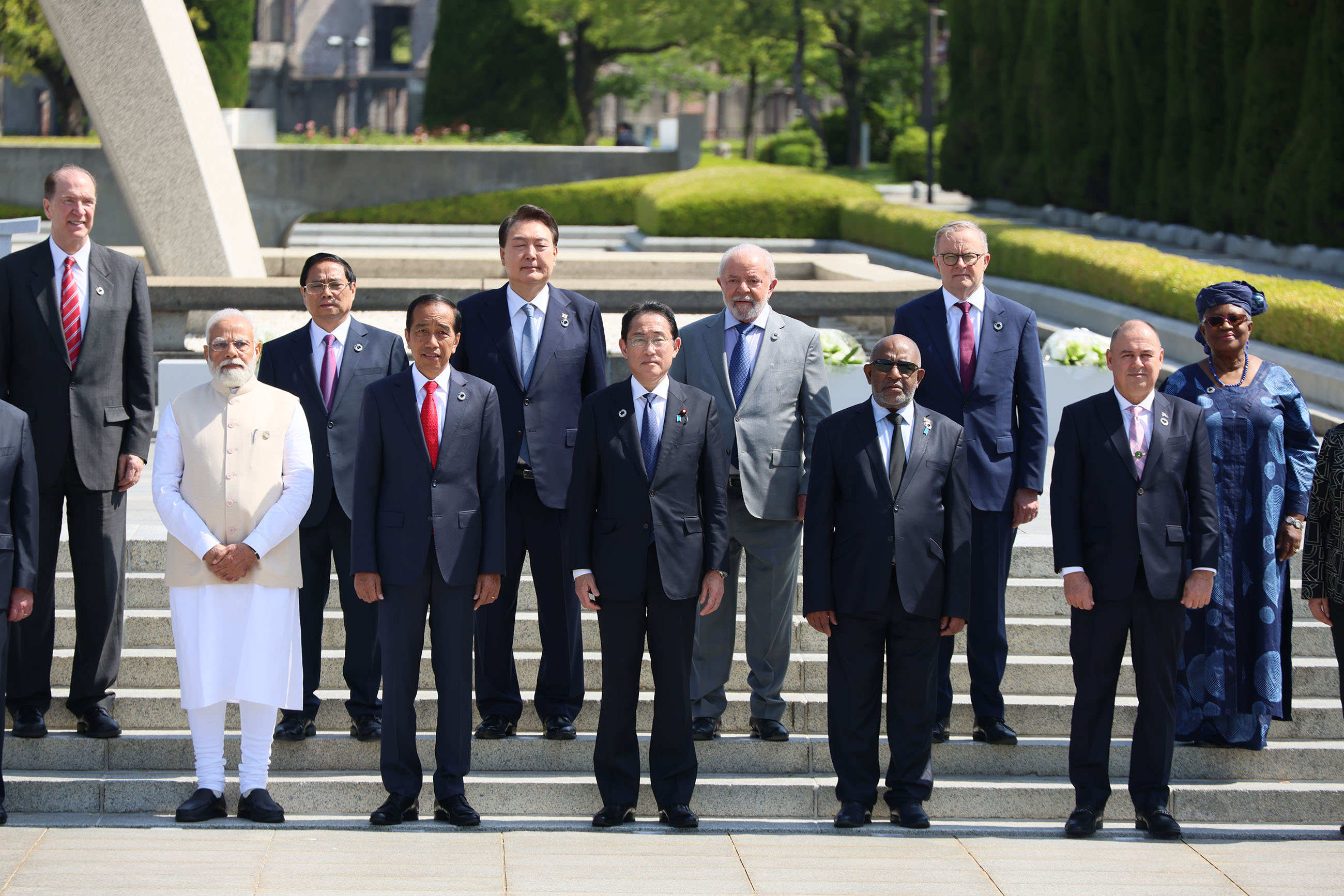
  Japanese Prime Minister Kishida with the leaders of outreach nations.

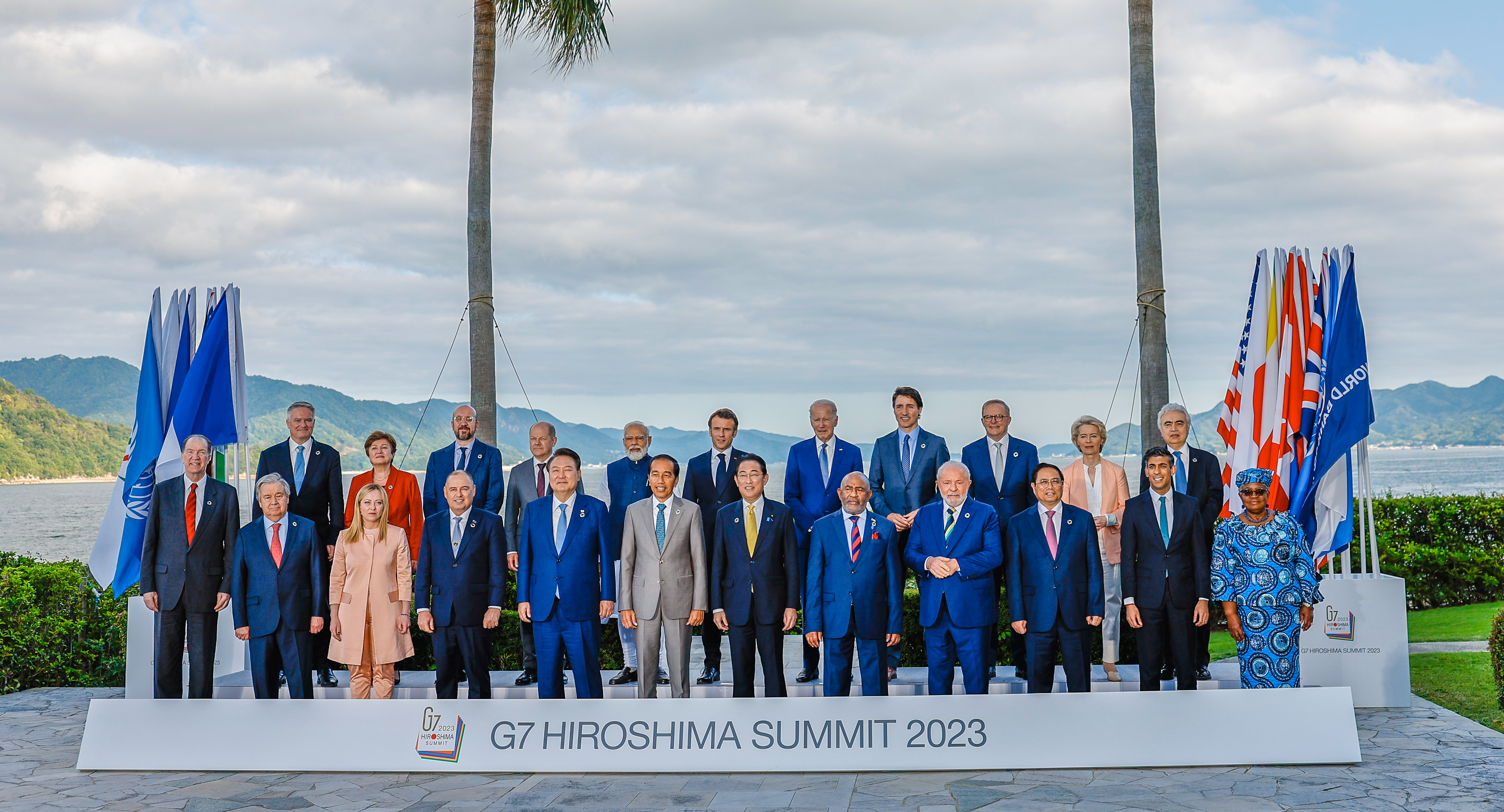
G7 leaders with the leaders of invited countries.

1. The chair Kishida touched upon the importance of coordinated response to multiple crises that the world is facing.
2. Regarding development:
  The participants reaffirmed that they will advance their efforts toward the achievement of the SDGs, and expressed their expectations for promoting concrete investment under the "Partnership for Global Infrastructure and Investment (PGII)" and various reforms including the reform of Multilateral Development Banks (MDBs). They concurred on the importance of transparent and fair development finance and the necessity of accelerating the response to debt issues.
3. Regarding food:
  The participants shared the view that it is of urgent importance to respond to immediate food crisis and establish resilient food security, and concurred on issuing the "Hiroshima Action Statement for Resilient Global Food Security".
4. Regarding health:
  The chair Kishida touched upon the importance of leader-level governance and international norm setting for structuring and strengthening the Global Health Architecture (GHA) as well as a perspective of "soft governance" as gentle coordination among existing organizations, among others. He also explained about the launch of the MCM Delivery Partnership for equitable access (MCDP) based on the principles set out in the "G7 Hiroshima Vision for Equitable Access to Medical Countermeasures", and called on the participants to cooperate with the partnership. They confirmed that they will continue to advance the efforts toward the goals including the achievement of the Universal Health Coverage.
5. Regarding gender:
  Kishida emphasized the importance of substantively coordinating several efforts, and the participating countries and organizations gave their accent to the idea.
6. Additions:
  The participants confirmed that they will tackle the challenges related to trade including the WTO reform.
- Side event: Partnership for Global Infrastructure and Investment (PGII)
  Three documents including "Factsheet on the G7 Partnership for Global Infrastructure and Investment" were issued.
- Issuance of "G7 Hiroshima Leaders' Communiqué"
  The Leaders' communiqué pointing to specific international law was issued one day earlier than customary practice.
- Session 7: Common Endeavor for a Resilient and Sustainable Planet
1. The chair Kishida touched upon the importance of discussing the global issues of climate change, energy and environment in an integrated manner.
2. Regarding climate change and energy:
  1. The participants confirmed that it is necessary to holistically tackle the challenges such as climate change, biodiversity, pollution and others.
  2. The participants confirmed that it is also necessary to work together as the response to "climate crisis" is an urgent task for all over the world.
  3. The participants shared the importance of pursuing the common goal of net zero in various pathways that maximally introduce using renewable energy and energy-saving technologies in accordance with each country's situation in order not to hinder economic growth, with the understanding of energy security, climate crisis and geopolitical risks in an integrated manner.
  4. The participants shared the necessity of enhancing supply chain resilience of clean energy devices and critical minerals vital for clean energy transition.
  5. The participants concurred that the assistance that leaves no countries or people vulnerable to climate change by mobilizing climate finance.
3. Regarding environment:
  The participants reaffirmed that they will strengthen cooperation for advancing concrete efforts on addressing plastic pollution, protecting biodiversity, protecting forests, and addressing marine pollution.
4. Conclusion:
  Based on these shared understandings, Kishida stated that he would like to implement today's discussion to further actions on various occasions such as COP 28.
- Social Dinner

=== 21 May 2023 ===
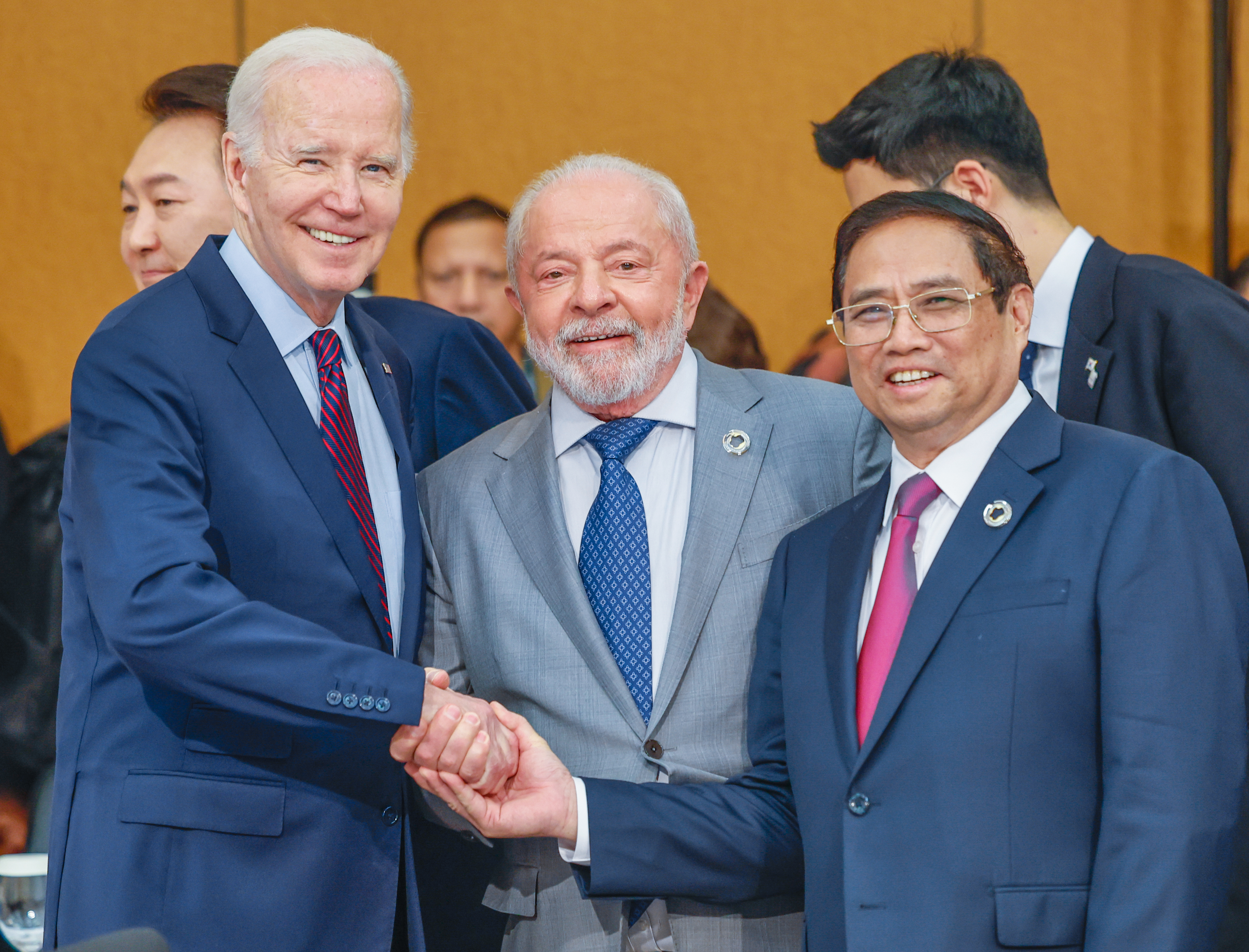
US President Joe Biden, Brazilian President Luiz Inácio Lula da Silva and Vietnamese Prime Minister Phạm Minh Chính

- Touring to Hiroshima Peace Memorial Park with the outreach countries and international organizations

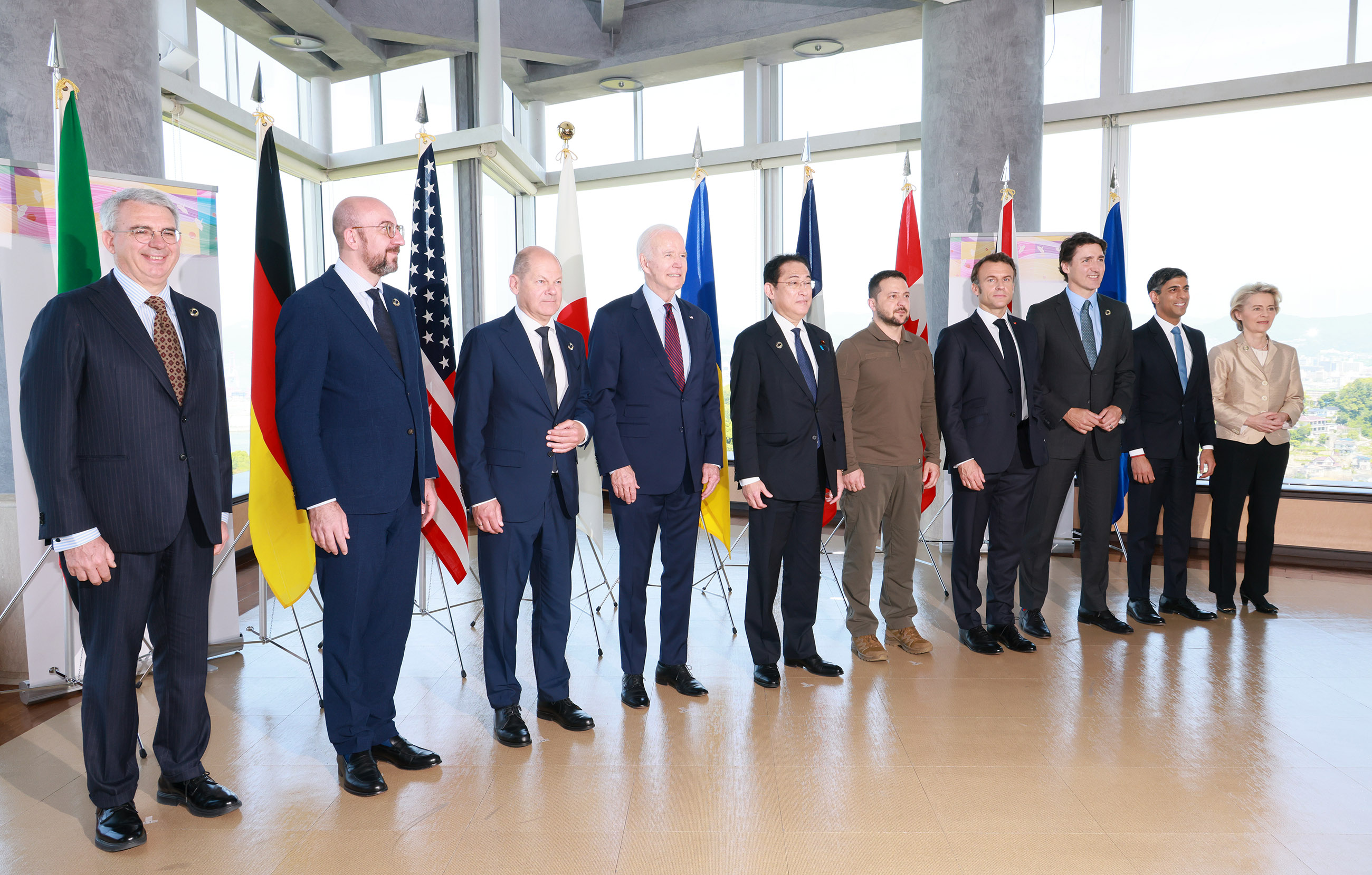
Session 8: Ukraine (part 2, G7 members plus Ukraine)

- Session 8: Ukraine (part 2, G7 members plus Ukraine)
  The G7 leaders reaffirmed their determination to restore peace in Ukraine and uphold the free and open international order based on "the rule of law".
- Session 9: Toward a Peaceful, Stable and Prosperous World (with all the outreach countries and organizations)
1. The chair Kishida emphasized that any unilateral attempt to change the status quo by force is unacceptable anywhere in the world and strongly appealed the necessity to end Russia's aggression against Ukraine as soon as possible and uphold the free and open international order based on "the rule of law".
2. Regarding the situation in Ukraine:
  The participants expressed grave concern on human suffering and negative impact on the global economy, including energy and food insecurity.
3. The participants shared the recognition of four important points:
  1. All countries should adhere to the principles of the UN Charter, including respect for sovereignty and territorial integrity.
  2. Confrontation should be resolved through dialogue, and support a just and durable peace that is based on respect for international law and the principles of the UN Charter.
  3. Any unilateral attempt to change the status quo by force is unacceptable.
  4. Strive to uphold the free and open international order based on "the rule of law".
    (Some leaders also pointed out the need for realistic effort towards a "world without nuclear weapons" as well as the need to reform the UN including its Security Council)
4. The participants reaffirmed to continue dialogue and address the challenges to peace and stability.
- Session 10: Closing
- Chairman's press conference
- Visiting to Hiroshima Peace Memorial Park with Ukraine's President

== Events leading to the summit ==
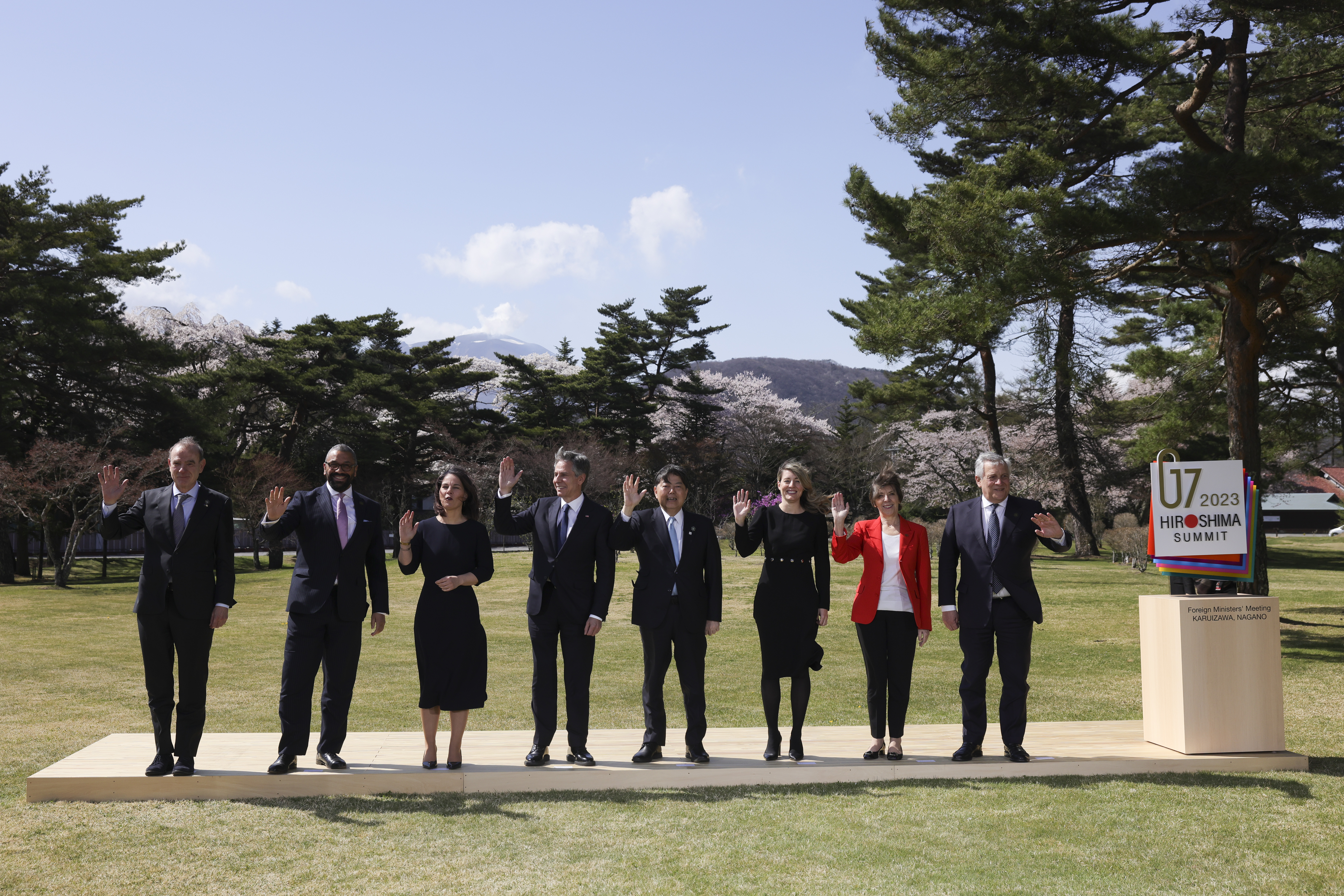
Foreign ministers of G7 member states, 17 April 2023.

On 18 February 2023, the first of a series of G7 Foreign Ministers' Meeting was held in Germany with the participation of the Foreign Minister of Ukraine expected.

On 24 February 2023, one year since the Russian invasion of Ukraine began, the G7 Leaders' Video Conference was held. After the opening remarks by Prime Minister Kishida as the Chair and a statement by Volodymyr Zelenskyy, President of Ukraine, the G7 Leaders had a discussion. The G7 Leaders' Statement was released after the meeting.

On 19 March 2023, the G7 Foreign Ministers condemned in the strongest terms North Korea's launch of yet another Intercontinental Ballistic Missile (ICBM) on 16th, which undermines regional and international peace and security.

On 4 April 2023, a G7 Trade Ministers' Meeting via video conference was held to discuss on maintaining and strengthening the free and fair trade system as well as enhancing economic security, and a G7 Trade Ministers' Statement was issued on the day.

On 12 April 2023, the G7 Finance Ministers and Central Bank Governors met in Washington D.C., and issued a statement pledging financial system stability and supply chain diversity.

From 15 to 16 April 2023, the G7 Ministers' Meeting on Climate, Energy and Environment was held in Sapporo, and issued a communiqué with annex documents.

From 16 to 18 April 2023, the second G7 Foreign Ministers' Meeting was held at Karuizawa-machi in Nagano Prefecture. The G7's top diplomats discussed to project a unified message on concerns about China after controversial remarks by French President Emmanuel Macron. Following the meeting, their statement in the communiqué again condemns, in the strongest possible terms, the Russian invasion of Ukraine. The foreign ministers also reiterated the importance of a Free and Open Indo-Pacific and condemned North Korean ballistic missile launches. During this period South Africa was notified that the African Union chair (the Comoros) would instead be invited attend the summit in its place; causing speculation that South Africa was being excluded for its non-critical diplomatic position towards Russia in the conflict.

From 22 to 23 April 2023, the G7 Agriculture Ministers' meeting was held in the city of Miyazaki in Miyazaki Prefecture. After the meeting, a joint communiqué was issued, and condemned Russia for its war against Ukraine causing impact to the global food security, while also agreeing to help Kyiv revive its agriculture industry by sharing knowledge on demining farmland and rebuilding infrastructure. During the same period from 22 to 23 April 2023, the G7 Labour and Employment Ministers' Meeting was held at Kurashiki in Okayama Prefecture, and issued a statement underlining the need to actively promote the reskilling of workers.

From 29 to 30 April 2023, the G7 Digital Ministers' meeting was held in Takasaki in Gunma Prefecture. The G7 ministers adopted an action plan to ensure the proper use of artificial intelligence. Also, they discussed cross-border transfers of data and agreed to create a framework to support the concept of "Data Free Flow with Trust (DFFT)". The institutional framework has been called for by multistakeholders with the launched of a paper at the DX Summit- an official multistakeholders summit of the Digital Ministers' meeting.

From 11 to 13 May 2023, the G7 Finance Ministers and Central Bank Governors' meeting was held in the city of Niigata in Niigata Prefecture. The G7 finance chiefs released a joint communique to put more aid on the table for Ukraine, set up a new supply chain initiative, and vowed to fill regulatory gaps in the banking sector in a show of unity on global geo-economic issues.

From 12 to 14 May 2023, the G7 Science and Technology Ministers' meeting was held in Sendai in Miyagi Prefecture, and approved a joint statement. It said the countries will promote "open science," in which researchers around the world share each country's research data and academic papers. However, the statement expressed concern that some actors may attempt to unfairly exploit or distort the open research environment and misappropriate research results for military purposes.

From 13 to 14 May 2023, the G7 Health Ministers' meeting was held in the city of Nagasaki in Nagasaki Prefecture. The G7 health ministers issued a joint statement which calls for fair and swift distribution of medical supplies in the event of a future pandemic, as many developing countries had difficulty getting access to COVID-19 vaccines. It also stresses the importance of sustainable fund procurement to strengthen responses to infectious diseases, and calls on all nations to enhance their financial and political support for a pandemic fund established at the World Bank last year.

From 12 to 15 May 2023, the G7 Education Ministers' meeting was held in two cities on the Sea of Japan coast, the first half in the city of Toyama in Toyama Prefecture and the latter half in Kanazawa in Ishikawa Prefecture, and issued a joint statement. The statement says the ministers support the universal value of education as the foundation of freedom and peace. The ministers will promote education merging the use of real and digital elements and create an environment in which information and communications technology, or ICT, can be used more effectively.

== After the summit ==
From 16 to 18 June 2023, the G7 Transport Ministers' Meeting was held in Shima in Mie Prefecture, and "G7 Transport Ministerial Declaration" was issued. The declaration is pledging to make a coordinated effort in promoting the use of sustainable aviation fuel (SAF) which is made from plants and waste oil. Ukraine's Deputy Prime Minister Oleksandr Kubrakov took part in the meeting, and the G7 countries reaffirmed their intent to support the restoration of Ukraine's transport infrastructure and promote the development of alternative logistics routes for the export of Ukrainian products.

On 21 June 2023, the G7 foreign ministers' meeting was held at London to follow the latest information on China and discuss their response.

From 24 to 25 June 2023, the G7 Ministerial Meeting on Gender Equality and Women's Empowerment was held in Nikkō in Tochigi Prefecture, and a joint statement was issued. The statement underlines the need for a comprehensive approach to close the long-standing gender pay gap, which it calls "a composite product" of structural factors.

From 7 to 9 July 2023, the G7 urban development ministers' meeting was held at Takamatsu in Kagawa Prefecture, and a joint statement was issued.

On 12 July 2023 on the sidelines of NATO summit in Vilnius, leaders of the G7 presented a plan to organize bilateral long-term security commitments to help Ukraine fend off Russia's aggression and issued the joint declaration of support for Ukraine. By 17 August, the declaration was joined by Belgium, Bulgaria, Czechia, Denmark, Estonia, Finland, Greece, Iceland, Ireland, Latvia, Lithuania, the Netherlands, Norway, Portugal, Romania, Spain, and Sweden as signatories, according to Ukrinform. Albania joined the declaration on 21 September.

On 16 July, Japan arranged to hold a meeting of the G7 financial leaders on the sidelines of the broader G20 meeting in Gandhinagar, India.

== See also ==
- 2023 G20 New Delhi summit
- 2023 United Nations Climate Change Conference (COP28)
- International law – in the Leaders' Communiqué
  - Permanent Court of Arbitration (1899)
  - Charter of the United Nations (1945)
  - Vienna Convention on Consular Relations (1967)
  - Treaty on the Non-Proliferation of Nuclear Weapons (NPT, 1968)
  - Biological Weapons Convention (BWC, 1972)
  - United Nations Convention on the Law of the Sea (UNCLOS, 1982)
  - Sino-British Joint Declaration (1984)
  - Convention on Biological Diversity (CBD, 1992–93)
  - Chemical Weapons Convention (CWC, 1992)
  - Budapest Convention on Cybercrime (2001)
  - United Nations Convention Against Corruption (UNCAC, 2003)
  - Agreement on Port State Measures (PSMA, 2009)
  - Paris Agreement (2015)
- Partnership for Global Infrastructure and Investment (PGII)
- Quadrilateral Security Dialogue (Quad) – the annual summit meeting was rescheduled on 20 May 2023 at Hiroshima
- World Heritage Sites in Hiroshima Prefecture
  - Hiroshima Peace Memorial
  - Itsukushima Shrine
