= Illegal, unreported and unregulated fishing in the Persian Gulf =

Persian Gulf IUU Fishing
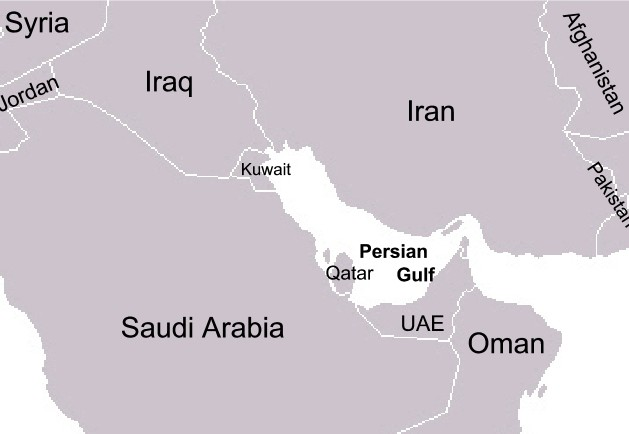
- Region affected by IUU fishing
- Location: Middle East, Western Asia
- Type: Semi-enclosed sea
- Basin countries: Iran, Iraq, Kuwait, Saudi Arabia, Bahrain, Qatar, United Arab Emirates, Oman

Illegal, unreported and unregulated fishing in the Persian Gulf includes activities that break national fishing laws, go unreported, or happen in areas without proper oversight. It poses a serious threat to marine ecosystems, local economies, and regional food security. Countries bordering the Persian Gulf, including Iran and Kuwait, have reported challenges in monitoring and controlling IUU fishing activities, both by local artisanal fleets and foreign industrial vessels.

The Persian Gulf is a shallow, semi-enclosed sea with diverse marine life. It has been heavily fished, and many of its species are now under pressure from overuse. Fish stocks in the region are declining due to both legal overfishing and illegal practices. Studies in Iran's Hormozgan province and in Kuwaiti waters have documented declining fish stocks and shrimp populations linked to IUU practices.

Efforts to address IUU fishing in the region include domestic regulations, international agreements such as the FAO Port State Measures Agreement (PSMA), and proposed improvements to regional cooperation. Oman was the first Arab state to ratify the PSMA in 2013. However, enforcement and data collection remain uneven across the region.

== Scope and nature of IUU fishing in the Persian Gulf ==
IUU fishing in the Persian Gulf includes a wide range of unauthorized practices by both domestic and foreign vessels. It involves artisanal fishers operating without licenses, illegal trawling during closed seasons, unreported catches, and activities by foreign fleets in national waters without authorization.

In the Hormozgan province, studies have estimated that unlicensed fishing vessels target shrimp and finfish species during closed seasons, using gear that results in high levels of by-catch and ecological damage. A 2015 observer-based study in the province estimated that illegal shrimp fishing alone may yield between 461 and 523 metric tons annually and is valued at over US$2.6 million. The same study recorded over 40 by-catch species which indicates substantial ecological impact.

In Kuwait, IUU fishing is primarily associated with unauthorized trawling and foreign fishers operating under forged or expired permits. The problem is particularly severe in the shrimp sector, with reported links to immigration violations and enforcement gaps. Studies have also found evidence of regulatory capture and political resistance to stricter oversight.

Across the region, data collection and monitoring systems are weak, with under-reporting of catch figures being a common issue. This has led to significant discrepancies between reported and actual fishery outputs, complicating efforts to manage stocks sustainably. The semi-enclosed nature of the Persian Gulf and the overlapping claims to maritime zones also contribute to enforcement difficulties.

== Causes and contributing factors ==
Multiple factors contribute to the persistence of IUU fishing in the Persian Gulf. Research based on interviews with fishers and fisheries officials identified five key categories influencing illegal fishing: economic hardship, limited personal alternatives, cultural norms, management deficiencies, and the physical features of the fishing areas.

=== Economic pressures ===
Many small-scale fishers operate without licenses due to financial necessity. Many fishers keep working during closed seasons or without licenses because of rising living costs and unstable income. For some, fishing is the only option when other jobs aren't available. For example, some interviewees described fishing as their only viable income source, citing the inability to afford school supplies for their children or relying on fishing during periods when smuggling was not an option.

=== Limited livelihood alternatives ===
A lack of formal education and vocational training limits fishers' ability to shift to other employment sectors. Several fishers reported being illiterate or lacking confidence in their ability to work outside the fisheries sector. Many had no experience beyond fishing, which they had taken up from an early age, often as part of family tradition.

=== Cultural and social sorms ===
Fishing is often seen not only as a profession but as a way of life. Some fishers described the sea as "freehold", defining it as a communal space where fishing is a traditional right, not something that can be governed by external rules. This cultural framing can reduce the perceived legitimacy of formal regulations and encourage informal, non-compliant practices, especially when enforcement is seen as inconsistent or unfair.

=== Management and policy gaps ===
Fisheries enforcement in the region faces several limitations that include insufficient patrol coverage, bureaucratic delays in issuing licenses, and reluctance among administrators to fully enforce rules due to potential political or social backlash. Regulations often focus on industrial fleets, while oversight of artisanal and small-scale fishers remains weak. Officials noted that existing laws sometimes lack provisions for monitoring traditional fishing methods or enforcing seasonal closures effectively.

=== Geographic and infrastructure constraints ===
Fishing grounds in Hormozgan are often close to shore, making them accessible to small boats and harder to monitor effectively. The lack of alternative economic infrastructure in many coastal communities, such as tourism, services, or manufacturing, means fishing remains the primary occupation. This dependence on marine resources reinforces the cycle of illegal and unregulated fishing activity.

== Impacts ==
=== Marine ecosystems and stock health ===
IUU fishing harms marine life by removing breeding fish and disrupting natural food chains. In the Hormozgan province, unlicensed trawlers frequently operate during seasonal closures and in restricted zones, resulting in the depletion of commercially valuable species such as shrimp and demersal fish. The high incidence of by-catch—documented in studies to include over 40 species per haul—indicates further stress on non-target marine life and habitats.

=== Fisheries data reliability and management ===
Because many illegal catches go unreported, it's difficult to get accurate data about fish stocks. This hinders efforts to assess stock status and set appropriate harvest limits. Without reliable catch statistics, management agencies are unable to make informed policy decisions. This increases the risk of stock collapse or resource misallocation.

=== Institutional legitimacy and rule compliance ===
When fishing rules are widely ignored, it becomes harder for governments to enforce any regulations at all. In both Iran and Kuwait, enforcement is often described as inconsistent or uneven, with unclear jurisdictional mandates and limited coordination across agencies. These governance gaps not only encourage rule-breaking but also hold up efforts to build coordinated regional responses. The absence of harmonized monitoring systems and shared enforcement protocols limits the ability of Gulf states to collectively address cross-border IUU fishing threats, especially in areas with overlapping maritime claims.

== Responses and policy measures ==
=== Iran ===
Iran has introduced various national regulations to reduce IUU fishing, particularly in its southern coastal provinces. The 1995 Law of Protection and Exploitation of Iranian Fisheries Resources forms the legal backbone of fisheries governance and has been supplemented by gear restrictions, seasonal bans, and area closures aimed at protecting overexploited species such as shrimp. The Iran Fisheries Organization (IFO) estimates that more than 3,000 small unlicensed boats operate in Hormozgan waters alone, despite these restrictions. Co-management initiatives involving local communities and regional authorities have also been trialed in select areas, although their long-term effectiveness remains under review.

=== Kuwait ===
Kuwait has attempted to regulate IUU fishing through the activities of the Fishery Protection Authority (FPA), supported by patrols and ticketing operations. Between 2001 and 2017, the FPA issued nearly 10,000 citations related to illegal fishing, although the number of patrols was limited and weather-dependent. There have been recurring proposals to install Automatic Identification Systems (AIS) and other satellite-based tracking technologies on vessels, but these remain largely unimplemented. Researchers and policy experts have also suggested vessel moratoriums and expanded use of logbooks to improve traceability of catch data. Poor coordination between agencies like immigration, coast guard, and environmental offices has made it harder to enforce fishing rules. Allegations of political interference, patronage-based licensing, and inconsistent judicial action against violators have also been raised in fieldwork interviews with Kuwaiti fishers and regulators.

=== Regional and international cooperation ===
At the regional level, the Gulf states are part of the Regional Commission for Fisheries (RECOFI), established by the FAO. However, enforcement remains primarily national in scope, and RECOFI has not developed strong collective surveillance or data-sharing mechanisms. Oman was the first Arab Gulf state to ratify the Port State Measures Agreement (PSMA) in 2013, marking a step toward improved port controls on foreign IUU vessels. Despite formal participation in international frameworks, implementation varies among states. Regional cooperation is limited by political tensions, differing enforcement capacities, and fragmented legal regimes. As a result, coordinated action against IUU fishing remains weak.

== See also ==
- Exclusive economic zone
