= Agreement on Port State Measures to Prevent, Deter and Eliminate Illegal, Unreported and Unregulated Fishing =

2009 international treaty

The Agreement on Port State Measures to Prevent, Deter and Eliminate Illegal, Unreported and Unregulated Fishing (referred to in short as the Port State Measures Agreement (PSMA)) is a 2009 international treaty of the Food and Agriculture Organization (FAO) designed to prevent and eliminate illegal, unreported and unregulated fishing.

== Content ==
The treaty requires that fishing vessels request permission to dock at a port and inform the port of the details of its fishing operations. Permission to dock can be denied if unregulated fishing occurred. The measure is intended to block illegally caught fish from entering the marketplace. Other measures in the treaty include inspections of equipment, paperwork, catches, and ship's records. Though the treaty does not compel countries to apply these measures to ships under their own flags, they may choose to do so under the agreement.

== Creation and entry into force ==
The treaty was concluded on 22 November 2009 at the 36th Session of the FAO Conference held in Rome. Ninety-one states negotiated and agreed to the treaty text. Twenty-three states signed the treaty while it was open for signature in 2009 and 2010.

The treaty entered into force on 5 June 2016, which was 30 days after it was ratified by a 25th state. As of September 2018, the treaty has 55 parties, which includes 54 states plus the European Union:

- Albania
- Australia
- Bahamas
- Barbados
- Canada
- Cape Verde
- Chile
- Costa Rica
- Cuba
- Denmark
- Djibouti
- Dominica
- European Union
- France
- Gabon
- Gambia
- Ghana
- Grenada
- Guinea
- Guyana
- Iceland
- Indonesia
- Japan
- Kenya
- Madagascar
- Maldives
- Mauritania
- Mauritius
- Montenegro
- Mozambique
- Myanmar
- Namibia
- New Zealand
- Norway
- Oman
- Palau
- Panama
- Peru
- Philippines
- Saint Kitts and Nevis
- Saint Vincent and the Grenadines
- Sao Tome and Principe
- Senegal
- Seychelles
- Somalia
- South Africa
- South Korea
- Sri Lanka
- Sudan
- Thailand
- Togo
- Tonga
- Turkey
- United States
- Uruguay
- Vanuatu

Five signatory states have not ratified the treaty: Angola, Benin, Brazil, Samoa, and Sierra Leone.
