= Shetab Banking System =

Iranian banking clearance system

Shetab
- Operating area: Iran
- Members: 26 (Iranian Banks)
- ATMs: 57,000 (2019)
- Founded: 2002; 24 years ago
- Website: www.cbi.ir/page/15728.aspx

Shetab (Persian: شتاب, lit. 'Acceleration'), officially the Interbank Information Transfer Network (Persian: شبکه تبادل اطلاعات بین بانکی), is an electronic banking clearance and automated payments system used in Iran. The system was introduced in 2002 with the intention of creating a uniform backbone for the Iranian banking system to handle ATM, EFTPOS and other card-based transactions.

Prior to its introduction, some Iranian banks were issuing cards that only worked on the issuing banks ATMs and POS machines. Since the introduction of Shetab, all banks must adhere to its standards and be able to connect to it. Furthermore, all issued credit or debit cards must be Shetab capable. As of the end of 2017, the Shetab system had 54,300 ATMs connected to it.

== History ==
Shetab was introduced in 2002, and now all card issuing banks in Iran are required to connect to the system.

In 2005, the government obliged the Central Bank of Iran and the Iranian banks, mostly state owned, to set up all the necessary infrastructures (regulatory, hardware, software) for fully launching e-money in Iran by March 2005. While this plan has not yet fully materialised, local debit/credit cards are now commonplace and have removed the main obstacle to the growth of e-commerce (in the national scale) as well as the full roll out of e-government initiatives. By 2010 it is expected that 12 million cards would be issued, all of which work with the Shetab system.

The Agricultural Bank (Keshavarzi Bank) was the first Iranian bank to connect to the Shetab system.

In 2007, before the imposition of new sanctions against Iran, Tetra-Tech IT Company announced that using Visa and Mastercard is now possible for online sales and in Iranian e-card terminals at shopping malls, hotels, restaurants, and travel agencies for Iranians and foreign tourists. Iran's electronic commerce will reach 10,000 billion rials ($US1 billion) by March 2009.

== Connectivity ==
- In March 2005 agreements were reached between the Iranian Central Bank and Bahrain's ATM network Benefit as well as the United Arab Emirates's UAES to connect their systems to the Shetab network.
- In October 2005, Iran and China linked their banking systems.
- In July 2006 the Shetab system was linked with Qatar's ATM network (NAPS).
- In May 2008, the automated teller machine (ATM) network of Iran has been linked to those in Bahrain, Qatar and Kuwait, enabling customers to have direct access to their accounts from Iran and the Arab countries.
- In December 2016, plans are to link to Japan’s JCB and China’s UnionPay over the short term; and to Visa and Mastercard over the long term.
- In July 2024, the Shetab system was linked with Russia's Mir system.

== Members ==
As of 2025, all Iranian banks and some international banks in Qatar, Kuwait and Bahrain are members of the Shetab System, as follows:

- Bank Sepah
- Bank Melli Iran
- Bank Keshavarzi Iran
- Bank Maskan
- Bank Saderat Iran
- Refah Bank
- Tejarat Bank
- Bank Mellat
- Bank of Industry and Mine
- Export Development Bank of Iran
- Karafarin Bank
- EN Bank
- Parsian Bank
- Saman Bank
- Bank Pasargad
- Sarmayeh Bank
- Post Bank of Iran
- Sina Bank
- Qarz Al-Hasaneh Mehr Iran Bank
- Tose'e-Ta'avon Bank
- Bank Shahr
- Bank Day
- Tourism Bank
- Iran Zamin Bank
- Qarz Al-Hasaneh Resalat Bank
- Middle East Bank

== Impact ==
As of 2006, Iran was still very much a cash based society. It is expected that a unified clearance system, such as Shetab, will provide significantly greater efficiency, reduce crime, reduce money printing costs, and improve tax collection among other benefits. It is also expected to improve the quality of life of citizens whom, once the system is fully operational, would no longer be required to spend significant amounts of time organizing things in person and would consequently be able to conduct activities immediately over the phone or over the internet. The impact of the system is already being felt as corporations establish e-commerce, supply chains, online banking and retailing systems.

== See also ==
- Iranian rial
- Communications in Iran
- Economy of Iran
- ATM usage fees
- List of banks in Iran
- International rankings of Iran
