= Qarz Al-Hasaneh Mehr Iran Bank =

Bank based in Tehran, Iran

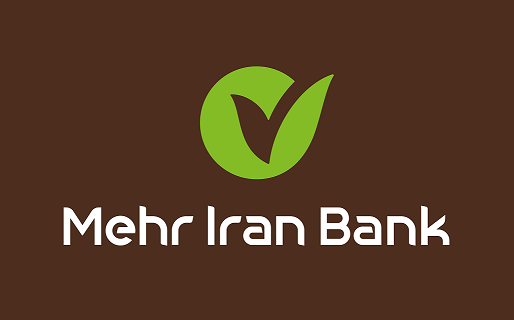

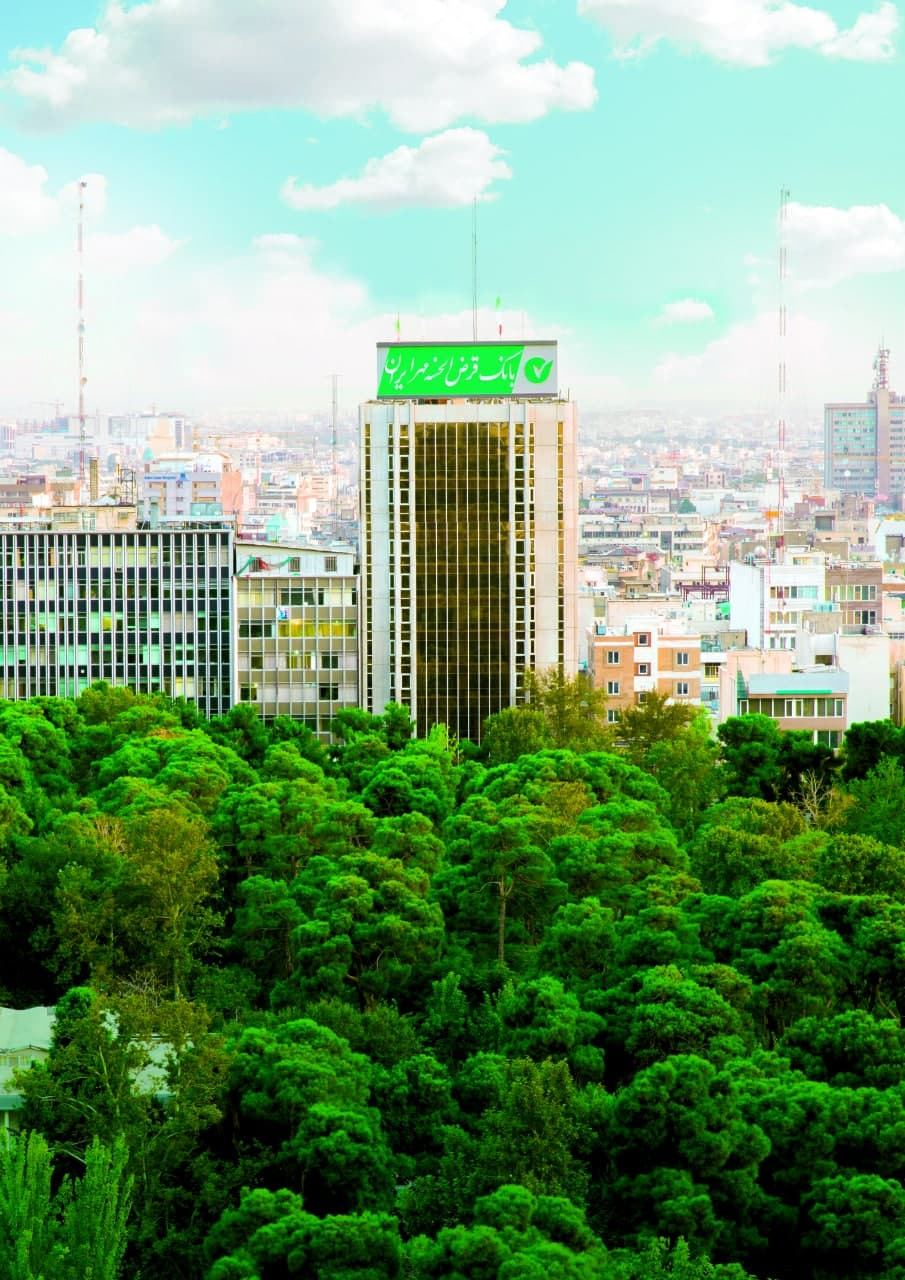
- Qarz Al-Hasaneh Mehr Iran Bank in Tehran
- Native name: بانک قرض‌الحسنه مهر ایران
- Company type: State-owned enterprise
- Industry: Banking, Financial services
- Founded: December 13, 2007; 18 years ago
- Founder: Mahmoud Ahmadinejad
- Headquarters: No. 204, Taleghani St., Tehran, Iran
- Number of locations: 568 branches across Iran
- Key people: Gholamreza Fathali (CEO)
- Services: Consumer banking
- Website: www.qmb.ir

Qarz Al-Hasaneh Mehr Iran Bank (Persian: بانک قرض‌الحسنه مهر ایران, Bank Qârzalhesinuh-e Miher-e Iran), also known as QMB, is an Iranian financial services and banking company that provides offering retail services, investment management and Gharz al-Hasna facilities. Gharz al-Hassaneh Mehr Bank of Iran, with an initial capital of 15,000 Milliard Rials and with the participation of Iranian government owned specialized banks, was inaugurated by then-President Mahmoud Ahmadinejad in 2007. The central branch of this bank is located in Tehran.

== History ==
QMB with an initial capital of 15,000 milliard Rials and the participation of 10 major banks in the country was inaugurated by the then President Mahmoud Ahmadinejad on 13 December 2007 and received an official license from the Central Bank of Iran on 8/27/2008. The initial capital of Bank Mehr Iran at the beginning of its activity was 15,000 billion Rials, until with the approval of the General Assembly in 1399, the capital of this bank increased to 25,000 billion Rials.

On 10 January 2019, the Central Bank of Iran issued an official license to the bank.

=== Sanctions ===
On 8 October 2020 the United States Department of the Treasury sanctioned 18 Iranian banks, including Mehr Iran Bank, which the department claims are "additional avenue that funds the Iranian government’s malign activities".

== Fund ==
The initial capital of Bank Mehr Iran at the beginning of its activity was 15,000 billion Rials, until with the approval of the General Assembly in 1399, the capital of this bank increased to 25,000 billion Rials.

== Bank shareholders ==
The shareholders of Bank Mehr Iran include Bank Melli Iran, Bank Mellat, Bank Saderat Iran, Bank Sepah, Tejarat Bank, Bank Maskan, Bank Keshavarzi Iran, Refah Bank, Bank of Industry and Mine and Export Development Bank of Iran.

- Bank Melli Iran 21.5%
- Bank Mellat 15.5%
- Bank Saderat Iran 14.3%
- Sepah Bank 11.3%
- Tejarat Bank 11.7%
- Bank Maskan 9.8%
- Bank Keshavarzi Iran 9.8%
- Refah Bank 3.5%
- Bank of Industry and Mine 2.04%
- Export Development Bank of Iran 0.96%

== International issues ==
Mehr Bank of Iran was opened as the first Qarz al-Hasna Bank in the country on 13 December 2007 and on 27 September 2008 it received the official license of the Central Bank.

- Selected as the third top bank in the Islamic world in 2018
- Awarding the Islamic World Economic Elite Award to Seyed Saeed Shamsinejad (CEO of Gharz al-Hasna Mehr Bank of Iran)

== See also ==
- Banking in Iran
- Mehr Housing Project
