= Banking and insurance in Iran =

Following the Iranian Revolution, Iran's banking system was transformed to be run on an Islamic interest-free basis. As of 2010 there were seven large government-run commercial banks. As of March 2014, Iran's banking assets made up over a third of the estimated total of Islamic banking assets globally. They totaled 17,344 trillion rials, or US$523 billion at the free market exchange rate, using central bank data, according to Reuters.

Since 2001, the Iranian Government has moved toward liberalising the banking sector, although progress has been slow. In 1994 Bank Markazi (the central bank) authorised the creation of private credit institutions, and in 1998 authorised foreign banks (many of whom had already established representative offices in Tehran) to offer full banking services in Iran's free-trade zones. The central bank sought to follow this with the recapitalisation and partial privatisation of the existing commercial banks, seeking to liberalise the sector and encourage the development of a more competitive and efficient industry. State-owned banks are considered by many to be poorly functioning as financial intermediaries. Extensive regulations are in place, including controls on rates of return and subsidized credit for specific regions. The banking sector in Iran is viewed as a potential hedge against the removal of subsidies, as the plan is not expected to have any direct impact on banks.

As of 2008, demand for investment banking services was limited. The economy remains dominated by the state; mergers and acquisitions are infrequent and tend to take place between state players, which do not require advice of an international standard. The capital markets are at an early stage of development. "Privatization" through the bourse has tended to involve the sale of state-owned enterprises to other state actors. There is also a lack of sizeable independent private companies that could benefit from using the bourse to raise capital. As of 2009, there was no sizeable corporate bond market. In 2024 the banking sector underwent a cyberattack, the "worst attack" in Iranian history by hackers, forcing the Iranian government to pay ransom to release the data of Iranian customers.

== History ==
In 1960 the Central Bank of Iran (CBI, also known as Bank Markazi) was established as a banker for the government, with responsibility for issuing currency. In 1972 legislation further defined the CBI's functions as a central bank responsible for national monetary policy. In the 1960s and 1970s, the expansion of economic activity fueled by oil revenues increased Iran's financial resources, and subsequently the demand for banking services increased exponentially. By 1977, some 36 banks (24 commercial and 12 specialized) with 8,275 branches were in operation. Their topline revenue has always been trade finance and letters of credit.

After the Revolution, the government nationalized domestic private banks and insurance companies. Bank law was changed under new interest-free Islamic banking regulations. The post-Revolution reduction in economic activity and financial resources required banks to consolidate. By 1982, this consolidation, in conformity with the Banking Nationalization Act, had reduced the number of banks to nine (six commercial and three specialized) and the number of branches to 6,581. Subsequently, the system expanded gradually.

The government began to privatize the banking sector in 2001 when licenses were issued to two new privately owned banks.

In 2014, Iranian authorities arrested 12 people for embezzlement of more than $4.5 billion (3.6 billion euros) from the Kerman branch of Tejarat Bank from 2009 until their arrest in 2013.

In 2024 the banking sector underwent the "worst attack" in Iranian history by hackers according to Politico, forcing the Iranian government to pay ransom to release the data of Iranian customers. The Iranian government hid the attack from citizens, fearing a bank run and the collapse of an unstable Iranian financial sector.

== Types of financial institutions ==
As of 2011, about 80% of the country's wealth was deposited with state banks and the remaining 20% with private banks. Iran's financial institutions are:

- Banks
- Finance & Credit Institutions
- "Gharzolhasaneh" Funds (Islamic non-profit granting funds -replicate many of the functions of smaller-scale credit providers)

== Islamic banking ==
In theory, Iranian banks use "provisional" interest-based transactions but retain the accounting standards of conventional banking. In 2009, Iranian banks accounted for about 40 percent of total assets of the world's top 100 Islamic banks. Three of the leading four Islamic banks are based there; Bank Melli Iran, with assets of $45.5 billion came first, followed by Saudi Arabia's Al-Rajhi Bank, Bank Mellat with $39.7 billion and Bank Saderat Iran with $39.3 billion. “Iranian banks are still the predominant Islamic banking players, holding seven out of the top 10 ranks and 12 of the 100,” the Asian Banker research group reported. According to CIMB Group Holdings, Islamic finance is the fastest-growing segment of the global financial system and sales of Islamic bonds were predicted to rise by 24 percent to $25 billion in 2010.

=== Commercial banks ===
Commercial banks are authorized to accept checking and savings deposits and term investment deposits, and they are allowed to use promotional methods to attract deposits. Term investment deposits may be used by banks in a variety of activities such as joint ventures, direct investments, and limited trade partnerships (except to underwrite imports). However, commercial banks are prohibited from investing in the production of luxury and nonessential consumer goods. Commercial banks also may engage in authorized banking operations with state-owned institutions, government-affiliated organizations, and public corporations. The funds received as commissions, fees, and returns constitute bank income and cannot be divided among depositors. According to the Central Bank of Iran, the financial sector has about $260 billion of liquidity, or 65% of the GDP of Iran's economy.

=== Derivatives market ===
As of 2009, the Iranian oil bourse was a spot market for petrochemical products mainly, with plans to introduce sharia-compliant futures contracts for crude oil and petrochemicals in the future. Trading takes place through licensed private brokers registered with the Securities and Exchange Organization of Iran. With help of Bahrain-based International Islamic Financial Market and New York-based International Swaps and Derivatives Association, global standards for Islamic derivatives were set in 2010. The “Hedging Master Agreement” provides a structure under which institutions can trade derivatives such as profit-rate and currency swaps. While the standards of the Bahrain-based Accounting and Auditing Organization for Islamic Financial Institutions (AAOIFI) are widely followed around the world, they are not enforced in Iran.

== Rates ==
As of 2010, the interest rate charged between banks (i.e. interbank rate) is set by the government of Iran (by the Iranian Banking Association Council). In practice, because the banking system of the Islamic Republic is run on an Islamic interest-free basis, there are no "interest rates", only "provisional profit" lending rates called Mobadala.

=== Official "provisional" lending rate (aka "Mobadala") ===
12.0% (2007), 11.5% (2008), 12.0% (2009). Free market rate is 24-25 percent (Aug 2009).

=== Deposit rates ===
As of 2010, private banks have acquired 11 percent of the whole money market in Iran.

The provisional profit rates for term investment deposits in private banks and non-bank credit institutions for the year 1387 (2008–2009) & 1390 (2011–2012)
Term of deposits	Five-year deposits	Four-year deposits	Three-year deposits	Two-year deposits	One-year deposits	Special short-term deposits	Short-term deposits
Provisional profit rate for 1390 (2011) * (percentage)	15	14.5	14	13	12.5	12.5	6-10
Provisional profit rate for 1387 (2008) * (percentage)	15-18.5	15-18.5	15-18	15-17.75	17-17.5	15-17.25	10-16.5

* The range given covers the different interest rates offered by different banks. In 2010, for the first time in annual policies, the interest payable on bank deposits is similar for both state-owned and privately owned banks. For example, overnight deposits’ interest has been reduced from 12.5% last year to 9% this year. Similarly, 5-year term deposits will now earn 17.5% (per annum) interest, as opposed to 19% the previous year.

As of April 2014, the maximum interest rate for deposits of 90 days or less is set at 10 percent, the maximum rate for deposits of more than 1 year is set at 22 percent, and for other maturities the cap is set at 14 to 18 percent.

In June 2016, bankers agreed to offer a maximum 15 percent interest on one-year deposits, down from the previous 18%. The rate for short-term deposits is set at 10 to 14 percent.

== Banking assets and liabilities ==
Bank Melli, Saderat and Sepah are Iran's three largest banks. The government plans to clear government arrears, recapitalize banks and strengthen supervisory powers (2016). IMF estimates public debt could be as high as 40% of GDP once government arrears to the private sector are recognized.

=== Debts to the Central Bank of Iran ===
Since 2002, the government has been barred from borrowing from the central bank directly (e.g. to finance budget deficits). Instead, it is allowed to borrow from the commercial banks who in turn, borrow from the central bank, and inflate their own balance sheets.

The total debt of 11 state-run banks to the Central Bank of Iran has exceeded $32 billion in 2009, showing a 10-fold increase over the past four years. Bank Melli Iran (aka National Bank of Iran), with nearly $9 billion, had the biggest debt followed by Bank Sepah, Iran's oldest, with about $4.8 billion. Bank Maskan, Bank Keshavarzi, Bank of Industry and Mines and the Export Development Bank of Iran were next with the respective debts of $4.7, $4.1, $3.5 and $1.1 billion. Private sector banks had much lower debts. Bank Parsian, the largest private-run bank, owed about $421 million to the Central Bank. In addition, the collective debt of state-sector companies to the Central Bank has reached $25 billion (2009).

Debts of banks to the central bank stood at 836.1 trillion rials ($27.3 billion at the official exchange rate) by the end of the fiscal year that ended in March 2016. Private banks debts amounted to $4.06 billion. Five specialized bank, all state-run, accounted for $18.7 billion (or 68.5 percent) of the banking sector debts to the central bank by March 2016.

=== Overdue loans ===
According to unofficial figures, overdue loans have reached IR175,000bn ($17.8bn, €13.6bn, £11bn), an increase of 75 per cent over three years (November 2008). Plan to inject about $13 billion to recapitalize the banking sector (2008). Ninety individuals have managed to secure collective facilities totaling $8 billion from Iranian banks, with previous $27 billion unpaid loans (2009).

In October 2009, Iran's General Inspection Office informed that Iranian banks have some US$38 billion of delinquent loans, while they are only capitalized at US$20 billion. Current average for late debts of Iran's state banks is over 15 percent while the global standard is 3 to 5 percent. Non-performing loans peaked at 17 percent of total loans in 2013, representing almost 10 percent of non-oil gross domestic product, according to the IMF.

Regarding corruption and cronyism in the banking sector, Tehran Prosecutor General Abbas Jafari Dowlatabadi said in 2016:

"Banking has been a safe haven in all such cases for corruption to incubate, with high-ranking management turning a blind eye on the corruption underway in inner organizational levels and or actively participating to gain their illicit interests [..] 11 banks had paid a sum of $2.5bn, with 1287 individuals filing for insolvency; the deadlock to be solved requires three fundamental approaches; the first remains with banks to adapt stricter roles and criteria for granting loans; the bank directors should be in the frontline of the fight for corruption; no run of-the-mill entrepreneur should receive inordinate amounts without putting in stake enough guarantees; cronyism should be abolished and unqualified evidence should not be lent credence as individual’s credentials as receiving loans."

=== Summary of the assets and liabilities of the banking system ===
In FY 2004 the balance sheet of the banking system showed that total assets and liabilities were US$165 billion, an increase of 226 percent since 1976. In that year, bank assets were divided as follows: private debt, 34 percent; government debt, 16 percent; and foreign assets (90 percent foreign exchange), 22 percent. Liquidity funds (money and quasi-money) accounted for more than 39 percent of total liabilities. The loan-to-deposit ratio was 100.8% in 2011. In 2014 non-performing loan ratio was reported to be around 18%. By 2017, the government is required to pay $12.5 billion to domestic banks to settle debts.

Assets/liabilities	2008/09 (billion rials)^{(1)}	2012/13 (billion rials)^{(1)}
Foreign assets	1,216,175.6	2,273,570.6
Claims on public sector	235,940.9	910,354.4
Claims on public sector - Government	206,925.9	698,989.7
Claims on public sector - Public corporations and agencies	84,613.5	211,364.7
Claims on non-public sector	1,866,550.9	4,138,974.7
Others	1,208,222.0	2,992,062.2
Sub-total	4,582,487.9	10,314,961.9
Below the line items	810,382.2	1,345,559.4
Total assets = total liabilities	5,392,870.1	11,660,521.3
Liquidity:	1,901,366.0	4,606,935.9
Liquidity - Money	1,901,366.0	1,136,717.7
Liquidity - Quasi money	525,482.5	3,470,218.2
Deposits and loans of public sector:	335,620.6	407,779.3
Deposits and loans of public sector - Government	319,542.4	389,635.8
Deposits and loans of public sector - Public corporations and agencies	16,078.2	18,143.5
Capital account	244,659.0	574,643.7
Foreign loans and credits and foreign exchange deposits	610,550.4	1,373,864.5
Import order registration deposits of non-public sector	2.0	2.0
Advance payments on letters of credit by public sector	662.7	1,501.6
Others	1,489,627.2	3,350,234.9
Sub–total	4,582,487.9	10,314,961.9
Below the line items	810,382.2	1,345,559.4

(1) Excludes commercial banks’ branches abroad. As of March 2010, Bank Saderat Iran, Bank Mellat, Tejarat Bank, and Refah Kargaran Bank have been classified as private banks.

As of September 2014,

Assets: The banks and financial institutions, total claims on the public sector (government and governmental institutions) amounted to 929 trillion IRR ($34.8 billion), and total claims on the non-public sector amounted to 5412 trillion IRR ($203 billion). The ratio of the claims on the public sector to the claims on the non-public sector was 17.2% in September 2014, 15.6% one year before, and 13.4% two years before. This trend suggests that the government is using more bank resources than it was previously, and that banks are getting more dependent on the government's solvency.

Liabilities: Deposits of the non-public sector amounted to 6245 trillion IRR ($234 billion) of which 78.4% is term deposits; this number was 74.5% one year before and 73% two years before. The trend is towards more term deposits and less sight deposits which could be a result of the higher cost of money, the downward trend in the inflation rate, and the stability in the economy. The breakdown of term deposits shows that 44 percent of term deposits are short-term and the rest are long-term. In line with these changes, taking a look at the yield curve for the last 5 years shows that the right side of the curve has moved upward significantly and the left side has become steeper, making long-term deposits more attractive.

=== Capital ratios ===
The average capital adequacy ratio of Iranian banks is 4%, whereas according to international financial soundness indicators, the standard of capital adequacy ratios in Basel II and Basel III are above 8% and 12%, respectively. According to the IMF in 2016:

"Where such tests identify shortfalls in capital or risk management practices, [Iranian] banks should be required to present and implement time-bound plans to remedy these shortfalls. Any bank that is not viable after such a process should be resolved."

In 2025, Iranian banks' average capital adequacy ratio (CAR) rose from 1.36 percent to about 5 percent.

== Digital Rial CBDCI ==
In 2026 CBI launched Iran wallet creating 90 million new deposits capped at 15 million toman max accessible via national ID number and blocked 200 million Iranian bank accounts.

== Money laundering ==
In November 2024, the Central Bank fired anti money laundering managers of three banks for undisclosed reasons and gave an ultimatum to 3 others banks to provide evidence, this caused a row with Ministry of Economy over executive authority.

== Banking reserves ==
The ratios of the banks' legal reserves in the Central Bank in 2009 were as follows:

- Current deposit: 20 percent
- Interest-free-loan deposit: 10 percent
- Short-term deposit: 17 percent
- One-year deposit: 17 percent
- Two- and Three-year deposit: 15 percent
- Four-year deposit: 13 percent
- Five-year deposit: 11 percent
- Other deposits: 20 percent

According to Article 14 of the Monetary and Banking Law of Iran, the CBI is authorized to determine reserve requirement ratio within 10 to 30 percent depending on banks’ liabilities’ composition and field of activity.

== Sectoral allocation of banking facilities ==
In 2008, Iranian banks extended 70 trillion rials ($7 billion) to quick-yield economic enterprises. According to Article 14 of the Monetary and Banking Law of Iran, the CBI can intervene in and supervise monetary and banking affairs through limiting banks, specifying the mechanisms for use of funds and determining the ceiling of loans and credits in each sector.

Sector	Share in total credits (%) - 2009	Share in total credits (%) - 2010
Agriculture, water, and processing industries	25	25
Manufacturing and mining	33	35
Construction and housing	20	20
Trade and services	15	20
Export	7	-

== Shetab Mir program ==
In November 2024 Bank Saderat, Tejarat, Melli, Sepah, Mellat, refah, tourism, Pasargad and Russian bank VTB were connected part of phase 1 of program making Russian and Iranian bank cards work on each other's POS devices.

== OTC market ==
Since 2009, Iran has been developing an over-the-counter (OTC) market for bonds and equities called Farabourse. Its shareholders include the Tehran Stock Exchange Corporation (20%), several banks, insurance companies and other financial institutions (60%), and private and institutional shareholders (20%). As of July 2011, Farabourse has a total market capitalisation of $20 billion and a monthly volume of $2 billion.

In 2010, 5.5% of the Mobile Telecommunication Company of Iran shares were offered on the Iranian Over-The-Counter (OTC) market, at a value of $396 million.< This was the largest IPO-to-date in the Iranian OTC equity market. In 2011, Pardis Petrochemical Co., the largest producer of urea and ammonia in the Middle East, Amir Kabir Petrochemical Co., Pasargad Bank, Yazd Alloy Steel Co. and Ravan Fanavar Co (a car auto part manufacturing company) went all public.

== Bond market ==
=== Participation papers ===
An important development for the Iranian capital markets was the opening of a fixed income market for the first time in 2009 with the issuance of term deposit certificates (traded OTC). The only type of tradable Islamic bond in Iran is the "Participation Paper". These are typically short term bonds (1–3 years) and have the same economic characteristics as fixed-rate conventional corporate bonds. For participation loans (known as Musharakat (in Persian) or Musharakah (in Arabic)) the interest rate charged by the banks is dependent on the profitability of the project for which financing is required (as in project finance). In April 2011, the government's plan was to limit the maximum rate at 20%.

Profit and awards accrued to participation papers are tax exempt. The Central Bank must obtain approval from the Majlis in order to issue participation papers. As at 2012, regulations for fixed income instruments oblige that a market maker always buys back the papers from the sellers in the secondary market at par value if there are no other buyers present.

- Bank Mellat's June 2010 offering of bonds worth 250 million euro overseas is considered the third stage of offering a total of one billion euro in bonds designed to help finance development of phases 15-18 of Iran's South Pars natural gas. The bond has a maturity of three years and an interest rate of eight percent.
- New issues in July 2010 included $300 million of papers by the Tehran Municipality and $100 million of participation papers by the Ministry of Energy. The vast majority of these participation papers pay coupon rates of 2-3% above bank rates.
- Also in July 2010, Iran & Shargh Leasing Co. (the first non-bank entity to list a fixed income product on the OTC market) listed $8 million worth of participation papers.
- In August 2010, Iran sold about $500 million worth of bonds for the first development phase of the gas deposit. The three-year bonds, yield 16 percent.
- In November 2010, Iran will sell rial bonds worth $2.3 billion to finance the second development phase of its South Pars gas field. The bonds will be sold through Bank Saderat Iran, Bank Melli Iran and Pars Oil and Gas Co. Previously, POGC had sold $1.5 billion worth of papers for the same purpose. These papers pay a coupon of 16% per annum and have a tenure of 4 years.
- In November 2010 Keshavarzi Bank listed $100 million of one-year tradable certificate of deposit (CD's) with an annual interest rate of 15%.
- Iran's national budget for 2012-13 has envisaged issuing €12.5 billion in bonds for financing domestic oil projects.

For up-to-date amounts and list of issuing agencies, see CBI's annual review(s) here.

Publicly purchased participation bonds by the Issuing Authority in 2010/2011
Issuer	Participation papers purchased (billion rials)	Percentage of the total
Municipalities	14,613	9
Government corporations	70,841	45
Maskan Bank	71,351	46
Total	156,805	--

=== Sukuk ===
Sukuk is an Islamic fixed income instrument, which is similar to an asset-backed debt instrument. As of July 2011 and for the first time since the law was passed three years ago, Iranian companies such as Mahan Airlines and Saman Bank have respectively issued $30 million and $100 million worth of this type of bonds. Iran will also issue $15 billion in sukuk (Islamic Sharia-based) bonds in 2012 to be invested in the domestic oil industry. Trading of Islamic bonds using the salam format, a deferred sale contract, was disallowed by AAOIFI in 2007. But in Iran's debt market, salam is a common form of sukuk. Mortgage Backed Security (MBS) is allowed in Iran's secondary market (e.g. Farabourse). According to AAOIF, main structures of sukuks are:

1. Sukuk Ijara (leasing): “The transfer of ownership for an agreed upon consideration”
2. Sukuk Musharaka (joint venture): “A form of partnership between the Islamic bank and its clients whereby each party contributes to the capital of the partnership in equal or varying degrees to establish a new project or share in an existing one, and whereby each of the parties becomes an owner of the capital on a permanent or declining basis and shall have his due share of profits” (see "Participation papers" section above.)
3. Sukuk Istisna’a (manufacturing finance): "A contract of sale of specified items to be manufactured or constructed, with an obligation on the part of the manufacturer or builder (contractor) to deliver them to the customer upon completion”
4. Sukuk Al-Murabaha (cost plus "profit"): “Sale of goods with an agreed upon profit mark up on the cost” (used as basis to justify credit card industry)

== List of Iranian banks ==
In 2010, The Banker listed 13 Iranian banks in the "top 1,000 banks in the world". In 2005 the Iranian banking system consisted of a central bank, 10 government-owned commercial and specialized banks, and four private commercial banks. In 2004 there were 13,952 commercial bank branches, 53 of which were foreign branches. Specialized banks had 2,663 branches. As of 2016, banking in Iran employs more than 200,000 staff in more than 23,000 branches of banks and credit institutions nationwide, of which 10,000 branches need to be shed according to bank experts.

Top 5 Iranian banks - 2012 ranking
Bank	Score (Iran)	Score (global)	Banking power/capital base ($ million)	Banking power/capital Base (% change)	Total assets ($ million)	Total assets (score)	Total assets (% change)	Credibility/capital to assets ratio (%)	Credibility/capital to assets ratio (score)	Performance/return on capital (%)	Performance/return on capital (score)	Return on assets (%)	Return on assets (score)
Bank Saderat Iran	1	259	3,109	4.46	54,877	3	14.22	5.66	7	25.63	8	1.45	7
Bank Pasargad	2	266	3,057	147.7	18,057	8	47.41	16.93	3	20.69	9	3.5	2
Bank of Industry and Mine	3	310	2,550	-2.16	9,432	10	12.1	27.04	2	3.2	13	0.87	10
Bank Mellat	4	320	2,402	NM	68,370	2	NM	3.51	12	32.59	15	1.14	9
Tejarat Bank	5	350	2,103	13.6	45,188	4	18.65	4.66	9	27.14	7	1.26	8

=== Commercial government-owned banks ===
No.	Bank name	Bank name (in Persian)	Year founded	No. branches (domestic)	No. branches (international)
1	Bank Melli Iran	بانک ملی ایران	1927	3,300	
2	Bank Sepah	بانک سپه	1925	2000	
3	Post Bank of Iran	پست بانک ایران	2006	400	

=== Specialized government-owned banks ===
No.	Bank name	Bank name (in Persian)	Year founded	No. branches (domestic)	No. branches (international)
1	Bank Keshavarzi Iran (agriculture)	بانک کشاورزی	1933	1,900.	
2	Bank Maskan (housing)	بانک مسکن	1938		
3	Bank of Industry and Mine	بانک صنعت و معدن	1983	65	
4	Export Development Bank of Iran	بانک توسعه صادرات ايران	1991	34	
5	Cooperative Development Bank/Tose'e Ta'avon Bank	بانک توسعه تعاون	2009		
6	Qarz Al-Hasaneh Mehr Iran Bank	بانک قرض الحسنه مهر ایران	2007		

=== Non-government-owned banks ===
No.	Bank name	Bank name (in Persian)	Year founded	No. branches (domestic)	No. branches (international)
1	EN Bank	بانک اقتصاد نوین	2001	680	21
2	Parsian Bank	بانک پارسیان	2002	160	
3	Karafarin Bank	بانک کار آفرین	2001	52	
4	Saman Bank	بانک سامان	2002	123	
5	Bank Pasargad	بانک پاسارگاد	2005	296	
6	Sarmayeh Bank	بانک سرمایه	2005		
7	Sina Bank	بانک سینا	2009	260	
8	Ayandeh Bank	بانک آینده	2012		
9	Bank Shahr	بانک شهر	2010	131	
10	Bank Day	بانک دی	2010		
11	Ansar Bank	بانک انصار	2010		
12	Tejarat Bank	بانک تجارت	1979	1887	
13	Refah Bank	بانک رفاه	1960	1128	
14	Bank Saderat Iran	بانک صادرات ايران	1952	3300	30
15	Bank Mellat	بانک ملت	1980	1820	4
16	Bank Hekmat Iranian	بانک حکمت ایرانیان	2011		
17	Tourism Bank	بانک گردشگری	2010		
18	Iran Zamin Bank	بانک ایران زمین	2011		
19	Middle East Bank	بانک خاورمیانه	2012		
20	Qarz Al-Hasaneh Resalat Bank	بانک قرض الحسنه رسالت	2012		
21	Ghavamin Bank	بانک قوامین	2012		

=== Investment institutions ===
No.	Institution name	Institution name (in Persian)	Year founded	No. branches (domestic)	No. branches (international)
1	Ghadir Investment Company	سرمایه‌گذاری غدیر	1991		
2	AminIB	تأمین سرمایه امین	2008		
3	EN Bank	شرکت سرمایه گذاری بانک اقنصاد نوین	1994		
4	Pasargad Bank	شرکت سرمایه گذاری بانک پاسارگاد	2008		
5	Mofid Securities Co.	شرکت کارگزاری مفید	1994		
6	MellatIB	تأمین سرمایه بانک ملت	2011		

=== Credit agency ===
Iranian consumers have little debt (2015).

Iran does not have any special credit rating institute for customer's credibility rating but all Iranian banks are obligated to send statistics of bounced check to the Central Bank of Iran. However following-up on all bounced checks is a "difficult task".

In 2010, Iran Credit Rating Consulting Company became Iran's first credit agency by decree of the CBI.

=== Presence abroad ===
A number of Iranian banks have established branches abroad, several of which have been subject to program of consolidation. Thus, in recent years, Bank Saderat has acquired the Iran Overseas Investment Bank (from Bank Mellat), and branches of Bank Melli and the Bank of Industry and Mines in London to form Saderat International. In addition, the London branches of Bank Tejarat and Bank Mellat merged to form Persia Bank. As of 2016, Bank Melli Iran branches in Hamburg and Paris, Bank Sepah Plc in London and Bank Sepah branches in Rome and Frankfurt are also among Iranian state-owned financial entities licensed to operate in Europe.

== Venture capital ==
Iran has shown an increasing interest in various entrepreneurship fields, in higher educational settings, policy making and business. Although primary and secondary school textbooks do not address entrepreneurship, several universities including Tehran University and Sharif University, offer courses on entrepreneurship to undergraduate and graduate students.

According to the 2012 Global Entrepreneurship Monitor report, the rate of entrepreneurship in Iran among men fluctuated between 14 and 20% while the same rate for women (between the ages of 18 and 64) fluctuated from 4 to 6% between 2008 and 2012 (& while their overall economic participation makes up only 13% of the entire economy). In 2012, Iran scored 67 among 177 countries according to the Global Entrepreneurship and Development Index. Some of this activity falls under the informal economy.

Iran's fifth economic plan (2010–15) has allotted $3 billion to the Initial Investment Technology Fund, which is designed to support new university graduates who want to develop their ideas and carry out innovative projects. The Innovation and Prosperity Fund was also established in March 2011 to support knowledge base companies & foreign direct investment in Iran. Avatech is one of Iran's well-known start-up incubator located at Tehran University. Sarava and Griffon Capital are Iran's first venture-capital and private equity funds respectively. As of 2014, Canton Hermidas Private Equity and Swicorp are the two foreign based private equity funds that have a focus on Iran. Foreign companies are beginning to explore ways to start technology companies in Iran or allow their services to become available in the country.

== Foreign banks ==
According to CBI, five offices of foreign banks (as of May 2012) operate in Tehran and Kish free trade zone.

Article 44 (fifth clause) of the Iranian Constitution Law had heretofore placed banking activities exclusively in the hands of government. In tandem with the Law on Usury Free Banking Operations, these two measures effectively blocked foreign banking operations from conducting business in mainland Iran. In 2009 the Constitution was to be amended to allow foreign banks to operate normally in mainland Iran.

As of 2015, there is no limitation for the activities of foreign banks in Iranian free economic zones. They may also open branches and representative offices in mainland or hold 40% shares of an independent unit.

=== Foreign branches ===
The minimum capitalization for establishing a foreign bank branch in Iran is euro 5m. A handful of foreign bank branches and representative offices extant in the country were allowed to undertake administrative and coordination activities but were not permitted to open customer accounts inside the territory of mainland Iran, receive deposits or extend normative facilities.

According to the new rules, only the Iranian government has the authority to form joint banks with foreign entities. Foreign entities can now hold over ten percent of the shares in joint banks with Iran but their shares cannot exceed more than 49 percent. Under the same provisions, foreign individuals and entities that have at least 51% Iranian ownership shall be considered Iranian companies.

=== Mainland activities ===
In 2008, Bank Markazi (the central bank) formally officiated over the opening of Iran's first foreign bank branch in the capital, Tehran. The Iran-Europe Commercial Bank, which is registered in Hamburg, Germany, but is majority owned by the Bank of Industry and Mines of Iran. The second foreign bank to be created in Iran was the joint Iranian-Venezuelan bank.

In 2009, four US banks, including Citibank and Goldman Sachs applied for opening a branch in Iran. The banks made a formal request to the Central Bank of Iran (CBI) to establish a branch. If the Majlis and CBI approve their request, these four banks will set up a temporary branch in an Iranian free trade zone. And if they can work according to the Iranian banking law (i.e. usury-free banking), they will also be allowed to open branches in Tehran and other cities.

In 2010, Tehran Times reported [instead?] that the banks filing the requests for working in Iran were from "states in the Persian Gulf and the Middle East regions as well as Asia".

=== Free trade zones ===
Minimum capitalization for a bank operating in Iran's FTZ is $100 million (2016). Foreign banks could operate in Iran's free trade zone areas for many years and there are three such banks on Iran's Kish Island in the Persian Gulf (2012). Iran's Majlis (parliament) has ratified the bill for the establishment of domestic-foreign joint banks and insurance companies in free trade zones.

=== Sanctions ===
The United States has attempted to isolate Iran from the international financial and commercial system in an effort to promote policy change in Iran regarding its nuclear program and financing of alleged terrorism.

In 2006, Swiss banks UBS and Credit Suisse as well as ABN AMRO and HSBC - decided to end their operations in Iran. UBS announced that it had stopped doing business with Iran because of the company's economic and risk analysis of the situation in the country. UBS stated that it will no longer deal with individuals, companies or state institutions such as the Central Bank of Iran.

Bank Melli, Saderat and Sepah are Iran's three largest banks. They have been hit with UN and US sanctions over alleged links with Iran's nuclear and missile programmes. Malaysia In 2010 the U.A.E co-operated with the United States in implementing international sanctions against Iran.

On 8 October 2020, the US imposed further sanctions on Iran's financial sector, targeting 18 Iranian banks. The banks targeted are Amin Investment Bank, Bank Keshavarzi Iran, Bank Maskan, Bank Refah Kargaran, Bank-e Shahr, Eghtesad Novin Bank, Gharzolhasaneh Resalat Bank, Hekmat Iranian Bank, Iran Zamin Bank, Karafarin Bank, Khavarmianeh Bank, Mehr Iran Credit Union Bank, Pasargad Bank, Saman Bank, Sarmayeh Bank, Tosee Taavon Bank, Tourism Bank and Islamic Regional Cooperation Bank.

== Insurance industry ==
The Central Insurance of Iran is in charge of regulating the insurance sector in Iran. 27 insurance firms dominate the sector, 26 of which are active in commercial insurance. The leading players are the Iran Insurance Company, the Asia Insurance Company, the Alborz Insurance Company and the Dana Insurance Company and more 22 private insurance companies that are offering service through agents and brokers. Export and investment insurance deals with foreign trade. Insurance companies Asia, Dana and Alborz will be listed on the stock exchange in 2009 after review and improvement in their financial accounts, internal regulations and organizational structure nationwide.

In 2006 the market share for private insurance companies stood at 54% and 46% for governmental insurance companies. At the end of 2008, there were 20 insurance firms active in the market, only 4 of which were state-owned (with a 75% market share). As of 2014, twenty-five insurance companies are active in Iran and all, except one, are privately owned. Parsian Insurance became the largest privately owned company to be listed on the Tehran Stock Exchange in 2010. Parisan is the third largest insurance provider in Iran.

In 2008, the total insurance premiums generated in Iran were $4.3 billion. This is less than 0.1% of the world's total, while Iran has approximately 1% of the world's population. The insurance penetration rate is approximately 1.4%, significantly below the global average of 7.5%. This underdevelopment is also evident in product diversity.

Approximately 60% of all insurance premiums are generated from car insurance. There are about 14 million vehicles in Iran and 90 percent of them are insured (2012). Of the 10 million motorcycles that operate on Iran's roads only 2 million are insured. Also, 95% of all premiums come from general insurance contracts and only 5% relate to life products (against the world average of 58% for life insurance in 2011). One of the defining characteristics of the economy is entrenched high inflation (and expectations) thanks to persistent monetisation of fiscal deficits. This produces an environment in which no prudent person would enter into a long-term savings contract. According to Business Monitor International, unless and until economic policies in Iran change radically, the reality of the insurance sector will fall a long way short of its potential.

Blood money was $67,500 in 2011, down from $90,000 a year before. Since 2012, Iran is insuring its own fleet of oil tankers because of international sanctions.

Payout ratios have shown consistent growth over the years. Last year, the industry average payout ratio was 86%. Iran has 2 re-insurers. Insurance premiums come to just below 1% of GDP. This is partly attributable to low average income per head. In 2001/02 third-party liability insurance accounted for 46% of premiums, followed by health insurance (13%), fire insurance (around 10%) and life insurance (9.9%).

The Central Insurance of Iran is currently in the process of implementing some deregulation within the industry and migrating from a tariff-based regulation regime to a prudential based one (such as the Solvency regime), which is in line with the internationally accepted standards.

Insurance industry's payout ratio stood at 63.8% during the fiscal year ended in March 2016. Insurers' generated premiums totaled $6.5 billion during the said period. Iran Insurance Company, the only state-owned firm, accounted for 39.47% of the premium. Asia Insurance and Alborz Insurance trail by a big margin behind IIC, holding 10.15% and 7.56% of the market's share, respectively.

Third-part auto liability accounted for 37.6% of insurance firms’ total generated premiums during the year ended in March 2016, with insurers selling about 19.18 million auto policies in the period. As of 2014 total (non-life) market premium was 1.27% of GDP with only $69 per capita spent on insurance.

As of 2016, Norway's Skuld (shipping), UK's Steamship Mutual and Standard Club (shipping), Protection and Indemnity (P&I) clubs (shipping), France's Coface (export guarantee agency), Italy's SACE (export credit agency), Germany's Hermes (export credit agency), Austria's OeKB (export credit agency) and Switzerland's SERV (export credit agency) are back doing business in Iran. Many large reinsurance companies are also considering returning to Iran (including Lloyd's, Allianz, Zurich Insurance, Hannover Re and RSA).

== Security Paper Mill ==
Security Paper Mill (TAKAB) is a paper mill and a subsidiary of the Central Bank of Iran responsible for production of security papers, including those of the Iranian rial banknotes.

== Iranian clergy protests against interest based banking ==
Almost all of the major Shia Marjas in Iran have asked the establishment to ban interest based banking.

=== Grand Ayatollah Javadi Amoli ===
In April 2018, Ayatollah Javadi Amoli said:

"The Qur'an calls Satan arrogant, but as far as I recall he has not been addressed as warrior against God in the Qur'an. Interest system of our banks is a war against Allah and His Messenger (PBUH). You may name a year as a year of production and prosperity (the Iranian leader named the previous year the Year of Resistant Economy: Production and Employment), as long as there is interest on loan in banking system, nothing will improve."

=== Grand Ayatollah Makarem Shirazi ===
In February 2019, Ayatollah Nasir Makarem Sherazi said:

"Banks have created conditions that have made people's lives miserable. Instead of charging people a fixed fine of 4% on loan, they add 4% more to the fine each year, to the point that, at the end of the fifth year of repayment, the fine reaches the peak of 20%. Usury is being done in the name of interest-free-loan."

=== Grand Ayatollah Noori Hamadani ===
In September 2018, Ayatollah Noori Hamdani said:

"It has been said many times that the money that our banks charge in the name of fines on the loans is interest and is impermissible. But the rulers either do not hear our voice, or they hear but do not bother to act."

=== Ayatollah Ja'far Subhani ===
In February 2019, Ayatollah Ja'far Subhani said:

"People take loans from banks and banks charge them interest. Along with this interest, banks also penalize people for delaying repayment. All religious scholars have declared it impermissible. Follow the rulings of the scholars."

=== Ayatollah Alavi Gorgani ===
In February 2019, Ayatollah Muhammad Alavi Gorgani said:

"Economic conditions are worse these days. In such circumstances, people are not able to even perform their religious duties. In this situation (banks) should not be in a rush to collect interest from them. We want banks in the Islamic system to be assistant, helpers and servers of the people. Please lower your interest rate a little to reduce the pressure on people. Or at least take interest according to the conditions, for example, when the economic conditions are better, there is no problem in collecting interest money, but when the wheel of the economy slows down, have mercy on the people and charge them less."

=== Ayatollah Husayn Mazaheri ===
In January 2019, Ayatollah Husayn Mazaheri said:

"Unfortunately, taking and giving interest has become a habit. Some people use such excuses under the pretext of Shari'ah. Its like bathing a rat with clean water and then declaring it halal (permissible to eat). Similarly, taking and giving bribes has become an intrinsic part of our system of governance. Usually nothing works out without a bribe. No knot can be untied without a bribe, no file moves without money."

== See also ==
- Central Bank of Iran (information on Islamic banking laws, payment system, foreign reserves, money supply and monetary policy)
- Islamic Economics Organization of Iran
- Iranian Rial – Currency of Iran
- Shetab Banking System – Iranian banking clearance system
- National Development Fund – Iran's sovereign wealth fund
- Communications in Iran
- Iranian Oil Bourse – Commodity exchange in Kish, Iran
- Economy of Iran
- Iranian Economic Reform Plan
- List of major economic laws in Iran
- Bank Shahr – Iranian banking and financial services corporation
- BRICS Pay – Distributed payment messaging mechanism system
