= Mofid Securities =

شرکت کارگزاری مفید Mofid Securities Sherkat-e Kargozari-ye Mofid
- Company type: Private
- Industry: Banking; Financial services
- Founded: 1994
- Headquarters: Tehran, Iran
- Area served: International
- Key people: Hamid Azarakhsh
- Products: Investment Management; Asset Management; Brokerage Services
- Number of employees: +950
- Website: www.emofid.com/en

Mofid Securities is a privately owned investment advisory and a full service brokerage firm in Iran that was established in 1994. Mofid was one of the top 4 performers among Tehran Stock Exchange firms between 2010 and 2013. Based on a report executed on 21 March 2015 more than 23% electronic deals were performed through Mofid Securities Co..

Mofid has divided its core business into companies since 2016. Mofid Entekhab is the asset management arm of the group managing $89 M in October 2017, Mofid Idea is the advisory arm providing M&A and advisory services to corporates and Pouya Finance is the data processing arm, providing easy access to market data and financial statements.

== History ==
Mofid Securities Company was established in 1994 by Hamid Azarakhsh.

== Logo ==
Mofid Securities logo was redesigned in 2015 by Design Vand studio, Iranian partner of Rob Janoff. The new logo is designed based on a pattern on an ancient Iranian pottery found in Tepe Hissar.

== Global investment advisory ==
In 2015, Mofid Securities and Sturgeon Capital, which is based in London and oversees $80 million in frontier and emerging markets, announced plans to invest in Iran's consumer-facing companies, including pharmaceuticals, banks and consumer discretionary. The fund is based in Bermuda and will be "sanctions compliant".

== Partnership with Azimut Holding ==
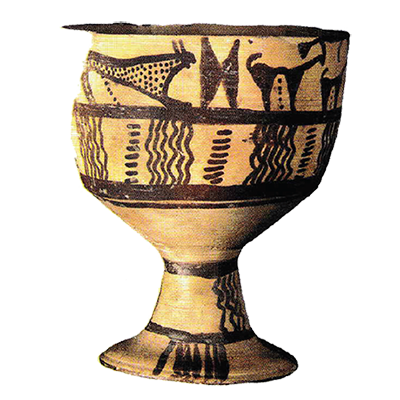
Mofid Securities new logo is designed based on a pattern on an ancient Iranian pottery found Tepe Hissar. it is estimated to be more than 6,000 years old.

On October 6, 2017, Azimut Holding, an Italian independent asset manager, and Mofid Securities engaged into a contract in which Mofid Securities sold a 20% stake in its asset management business, Mofid Entekhab, to Azimut Holding. This partnership is aiming to develop an onshore financial advisory platform and establish an offshore fund enabling foreign investors to access Iranian capital markets. The parties have ensured that the partnership will be compliant with economic sanctions requirements.

== See also ==
- Venture capital in Iran
- Iranian Rial
- Economy of Iran
- Iranian Oil Bourse
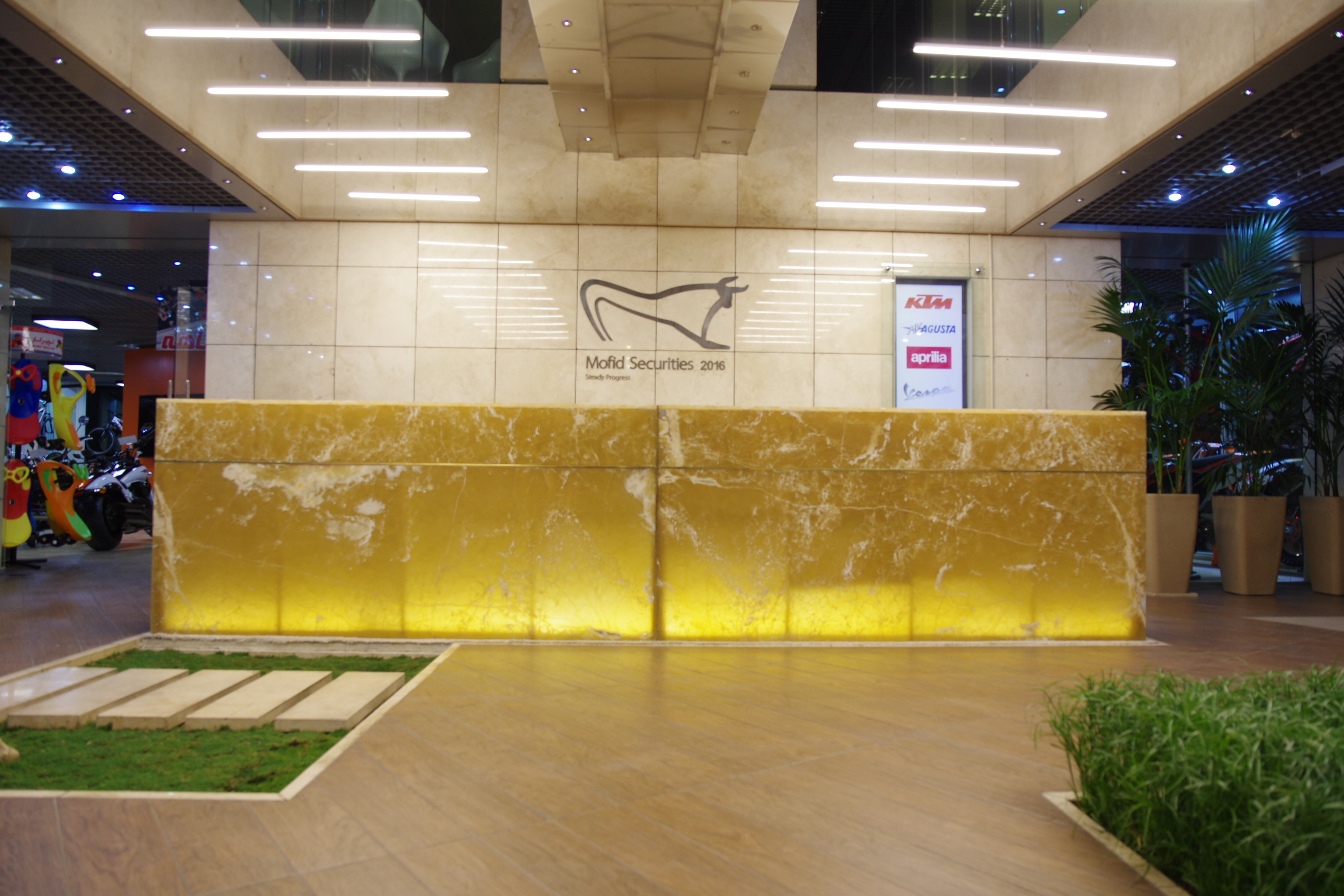
  Headquarters of Mofid Securities
- Central Bank of Iran
- National Development Fund
- Iranian Economic Reform Plan
- Banking and insurance in Iran
- List of major economic laws in Iran
