= Ghavamin Bank =

Iranian financial and credit institution

- Company type: Public
- Traded as: Farabourse: وقوام; ISIN: IRO7GHMP0001
- Industry: Financial services
- Founded: 2012
- Headquarters: Ghavamin Tower, Tehran, Iran
- Key people: Ali Abdali, CEO
- Products: Retail banking, insurance, loans
- Revenue: $1.6 billion (FY 2012)
- Number of employees: 4,300
- Website: www.ghbi.ir

Ghavamin Bank (Persian: بانک قوامین), Bank Qavâmin, was an Iranian financial and credit institution established in 2000. Ghavamin Bank is the first bank in the country with the aim of helping to enhance the living quality and financial support of working staff of Iran police forces.

It was dissolved after Iranian central bank merged 7 Iranian Armed Forces banks into Bank Sepah.

== History ==
Ghavanim started as a charity loan fund then in July 2000 was restructured as a financial institute and renamed the Ghavamin Saving and Charity Loan Institute. Its range of activities to the public was expanded to police personnel.

In 2004, following its successful and well managed risk to overtake the bankrupted Al-TAHA financial institute' debts and controlling the charity loan financial crisis in the Province of Isfahan, the Central Bank of Iran agreed to promote it to Bank in a restructure.

Finally, in June 2012 Ghavanim was licensed as public bank. In FY 2012-2013, Ghavamin Bank, with revenues of over 1.6 billion US$ dollars, ranks among the twenty-four companies and the seventh largest bank in Iran.

== Awards ==
In 2012, Ghavamin Bank has been awarded the EU banking management award.

In 2012, awarded ISO 10004.

== See also ==
- Banking in Iran
