= Sina Bank =

Iranian banking and financial services corporation

- Type: Public
- Traded as: TSE: VSIN1; ISIN: IRO1VSIN0008
- Industry: Financial services
- Founded: 1985 (as Bonyad Finance and Credit Company); 2009 (as Sina Bank)
- Headquarters: Tehran, Iran
- Key people: Gholamreza Fathali (Acting) (CEO)
- Products: Retail banking Transaction accounts Insurance stock brokerage Investment bank Asset-based lending Consumer finance Trade; International payments Foreign exchange
- Net income: ▲818 Million IRR (2009)
- Total assets: 24.143 Billion IRR (2009)
- Number of employees: 1998 (full-time)
- Website: https://www.sinabank.ir/en/

Sina Bank (Persian: بانک سینا, Bānk-e Sinā) is a private Iranian banking establishment offering retail, commercial and investment banking services. The company was established in 1985 as a part of the government's privatization of the banking system.

While established in Tehran, the bank operated throughout the nation with 1998 employees and 253 branches.

Sina Bank is listed under the Tehran Stock Exchange and is currently one of eight private banks in Iran. The bank is currently the 64th largest company in Iran. In 2007, Sina Bank had initial equity capital of 10 Billion IRR.

== History ==
In 1985, Mostazafan Foundation established Bonyad Financial and Credit Institution from its own assets. In 2007, the Foundation decided to establish a private bank for itself. To establish the bank, Mostazafan Foundation applied to the Central Bank of the Islamic Republic of Iran for permission to convert Bonyad Financial and Credit Institution into a bank. In 2008, the Central Bank of Iran agreed to convert Bonyad financial and credit institution into a bank. Since then, Bonyad Financial and Credit Institution started operating under the name Sina Bank. Mostazafan Foundation remains the largest shareholder of Sina Bank.

== Operations ==
The bank was established in 1985 as the Bonyad Finance and Credit Company. The company was the first credit establishment in the Iranian financial sector. In 2007, the company was privatized, and in 2009 was listed on the Tehran Stock Exchange.

The bank currently operates throughout the country, housing a total of 253 branches. In 2010, the bank came under European Union sanctions against Iranian banking institutions.

In addition to offering short and fixed deposit accounts for domestic and overseas clients, the bank provides letters of credit, treasury, currency exchange, corporate loans syndication, financial advisory and electronic banking services.

== Subsidiaries ==
Sina Bank has five subsidiaries in the fields of exchange, technology development, leasing and investment that operate under the Sina name.

== Public benefit activities ==
In addition to its financial and credit activities, Sina Bank also has public benefit activities such as helping earthquake victims and helping to buy medical equipment for underprivileged areas.

== See also ==
- Banking in Iran
