= Amin Investment Bank =

- Company type: Public
- Industry: Financial services
- Founded: Tehran, Iran, 2007
- Headquarters: Tehran, Iran
- Key people: Hossein Adeli (Chairman),
- Products: commercial banking, investment banking, loans, Mergers and acquisitions
- Net income: ▲680 Million IRR (2010)
- Total assets: ▲800 Billion IRR (2010)
- Website: www.aminib.com

AminIB, also known as Amin Investment Bank (Persian: شرکت تأمین سرمایه امین, Shirkat-e Tamin-e Sirmaih-e Amin), is a major Iranian banking establishment offering commercial and investment banking services. The company was established in 2007 as part of the government's economic reform of the banking system.

The bank specializes in services relating to Iran's petrochemical industry and mining sectors, representing the interests of the Abadan Refinery, and IMIDRO.

In 2007, the bank had an initial equity capital of $100 million.

In 2020, the Trump administration black-listed 18 Iranian banks, including Amin Bank.

== Operations ==
In addition to offering short and fixed deposit accounts for domestic and overseas clients, the bank also provides mergers and acquisitions services, risk management, financing and corporate loans.

== Corporate governance ==
- salman khandemalmele - CEO

Current members of the board of directors include: Mahmoud Bahmani, Masoud Gharaati, Reza Raei, Mehdi Ghadami, Ali Asgari, Saeed Khoda Moradi, Mohammad Reza Rostami.

== See also ==
- Banking in Iran
- Privatization in Iran
- Tehran Stock Exchange
