= Sarmayeh Bank =

Iranian banking company

- Type: Public
- Traded as: Farabourse: سمایه; ISIN: IRO3IBKZ0001
- Industry: Financial services
- Founded: 2005; 21 years ago
- Headquarters: Tehran, Iran
- Products: Retail banking Transaction accounts Insurance stock brokerage Investment bank Asset-based lending Consumer finance Trade; International payments Foreign exchange
- Net income: ▲468 Billion IRR (2008)
- Total assets: 12.04 Trillion IRR (2008)
- Website: sbank.ir

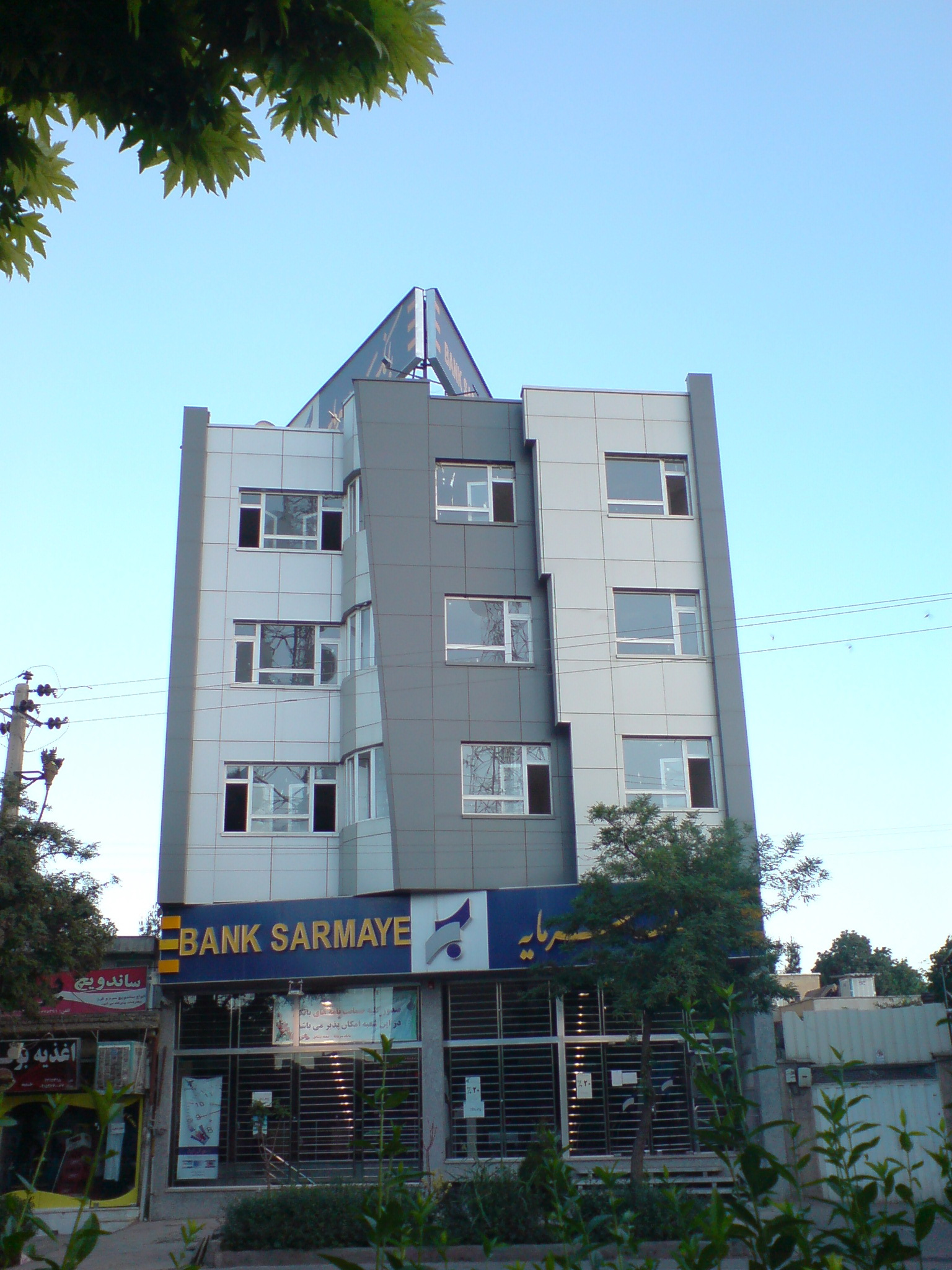
Bank Sarmayeh, branch of Nishapur

Sarmayeh Bank is an Iranian bank founded in 2005 as part of the government's privatization of the banking system.

Sarmayeh Bank is listed in Farabourse. In 2006, Sarmayeh Bank had an initial equity capital of $365.150 million. In 2024, the bank was targeted as part of a cyberattack by IRLeaks on the Iranian banking sector. The cyberattack was described as the "worst attack" in Iranian history by Politico.

== Operations ==
The bank operates a total of 153 branches. In 2008, the bank established several branches overseas in the Netherlands, United Arab Emirates and Tajikistan.

In 2024, the bank was targeted as part of a cyberattack by IRLeaks on the Iranian banking sector. The cyberattack targeted 20 out of 29 Iranian banks including the central bank of Iran. The attack was described as the "worst attack" in Iranian history by Politico.

== Shareholders ==
Sarmayeh Bank is currently the largest shareholder of the Bank. However, the bank currently has over 300,000 other shareholders.

== See also ==
- Banking in Iran
- Privatization in Iran
