= Middle East Bank =

Iranian Bank

Middle East bank
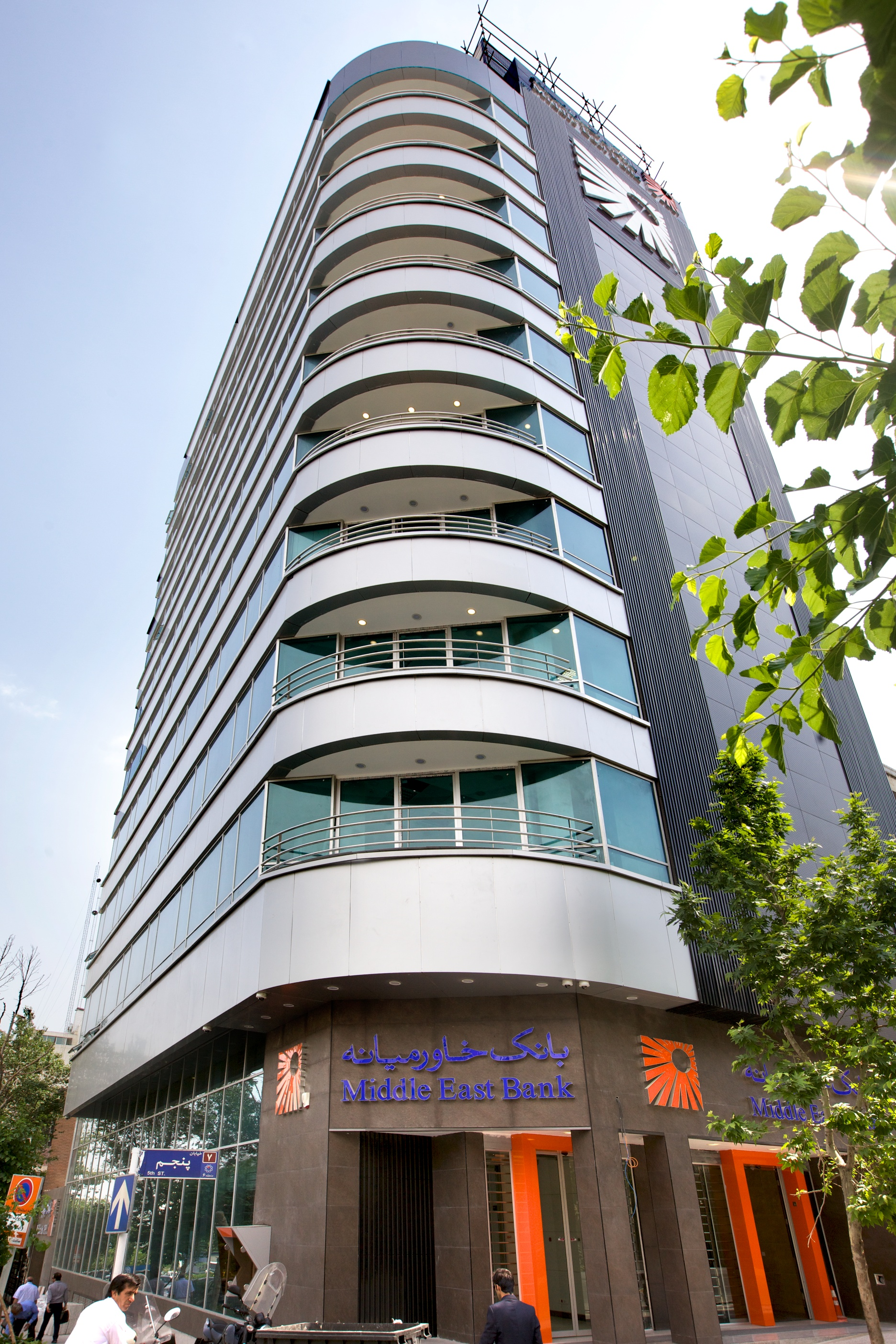
- Bank Headquarters
- Type: Private company
- Industry: Banking
- Founded: November 1, 2012
- Headquarters: Tehran, Iran
- Key people: Javad Javadi (CEO)
- Website: en.middleeastbank.ir

Middle East Bank (MEB; Persian: بانک خاورمیانه, lit. 'banke khavarmiyane') is an Iranian bank headquartered in Tehran. The bank was founded in 2012.

According to Iran Open Data, which lists bank branches in Iran for the year 1398 (2019), Middle East Bank is relatively rare, with only about 34 branches. MEB is owned by small private shareholders. They focus on the humanitarian trade with Iran.

On 8 October 2020 OFAC (U.S. Department of the Treasury) changed its sanctions listing. Middle East Bank is - along with all other Iranian banks - SDN-listed and “Subject to Secondary Sanctions”. It is however one of the few banks tagged "IRAN" (categorization as an Iranian financial institution) only and therefore maintained its SWIFT BIC. With the General License published on the same day Middle East Bank can fully maintain its support of the humanitarian business. The up-to-date sanctions status can be found at the following link.

== History ==
Founded on 1 November 2012, the bank began operations in January 2013 and by May, 3 branches had been established with Rls.1.4 trillion in deposits. In August 2014 they became subject to US sanctions as part of the wider sanctions against Iran.

In 2018 they opened their first branch in Germany.

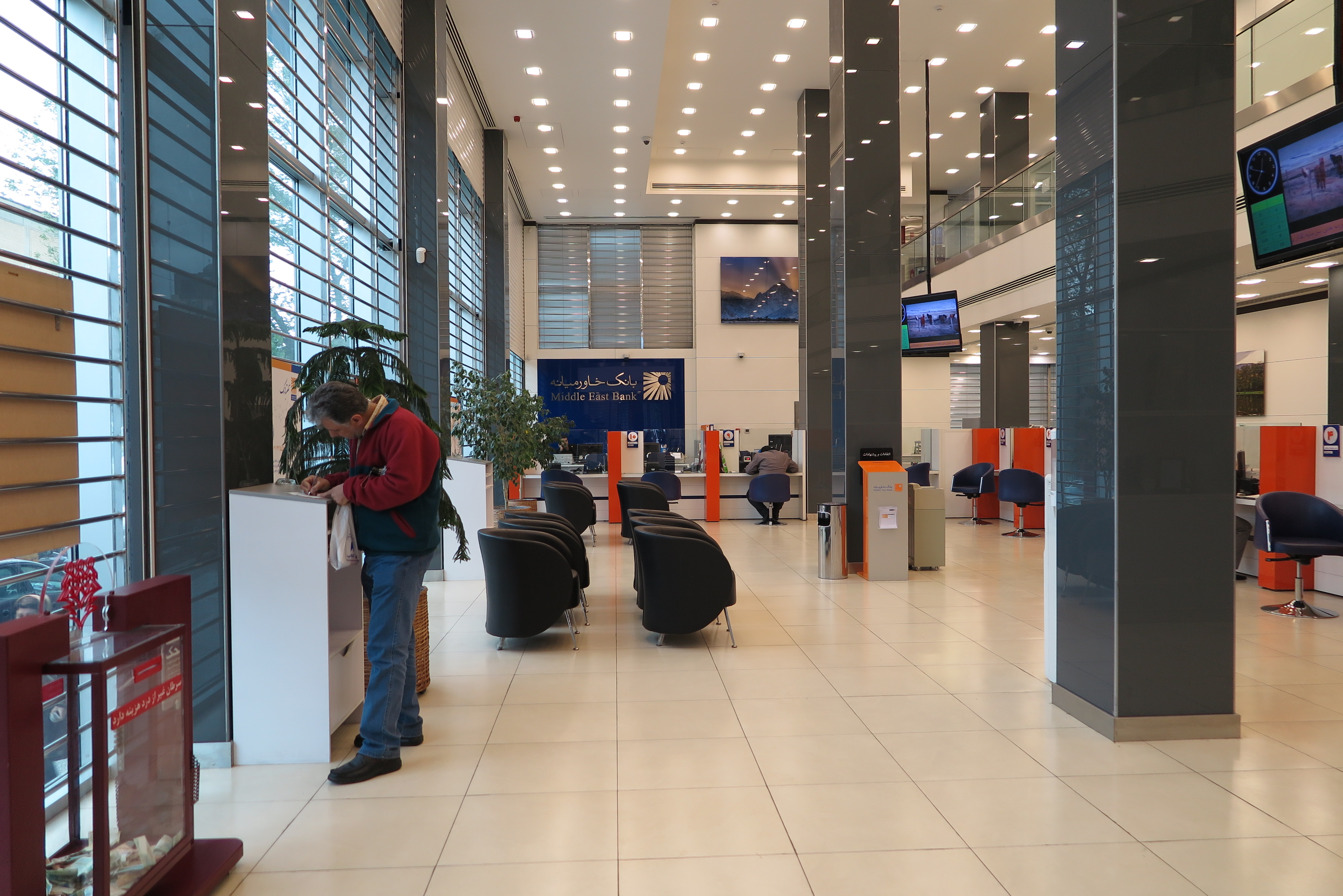
Middle East Bank banking hall

== See also ==
- Bank Markazi Iran
- Economy of Iran
- Islamic Banking
- Banking and Insurance in Iran
