= Bank Day =

Day Bank
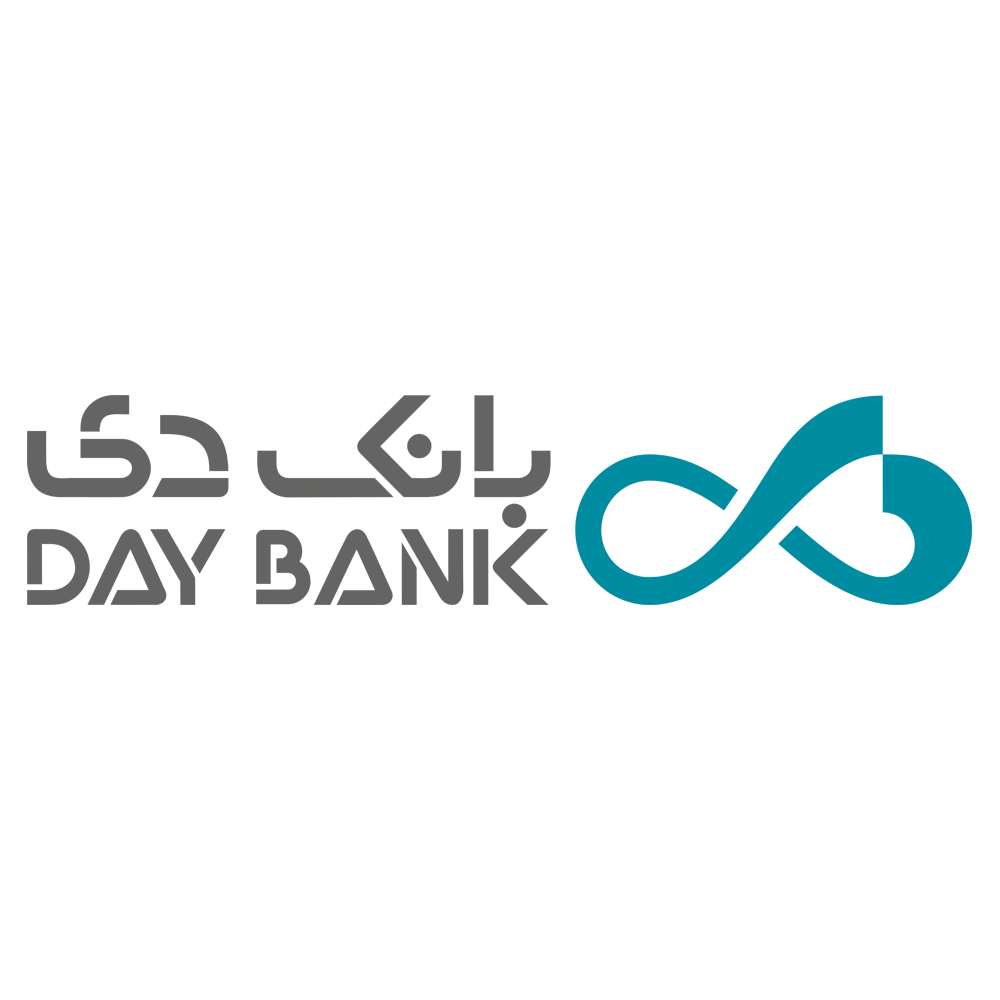
- Native name: بانک دی
- Type: Public
- Traded as: Farabourse: IFB - Day Bank; ISIN: IRO3BDYZ0001
- Industry: Banking, Financial services
- Founded: 2010
- Headquarters: Tehran, Iran
- Key people: Barat Karimi (CEO)
- Products: Consumer banking, corporate banking, finance and insurance, investment banking, mortgage loans, wealth management, credit cards,
- Website: bank-day.ir

Bank Day (Persian: بانک دی, Bānk-e Dey) is a non-state owned bank, established in 2010, which conducts its operations within the guidelines and instructions of the Central Bank of the Islamic Republic of Iran (CBI).

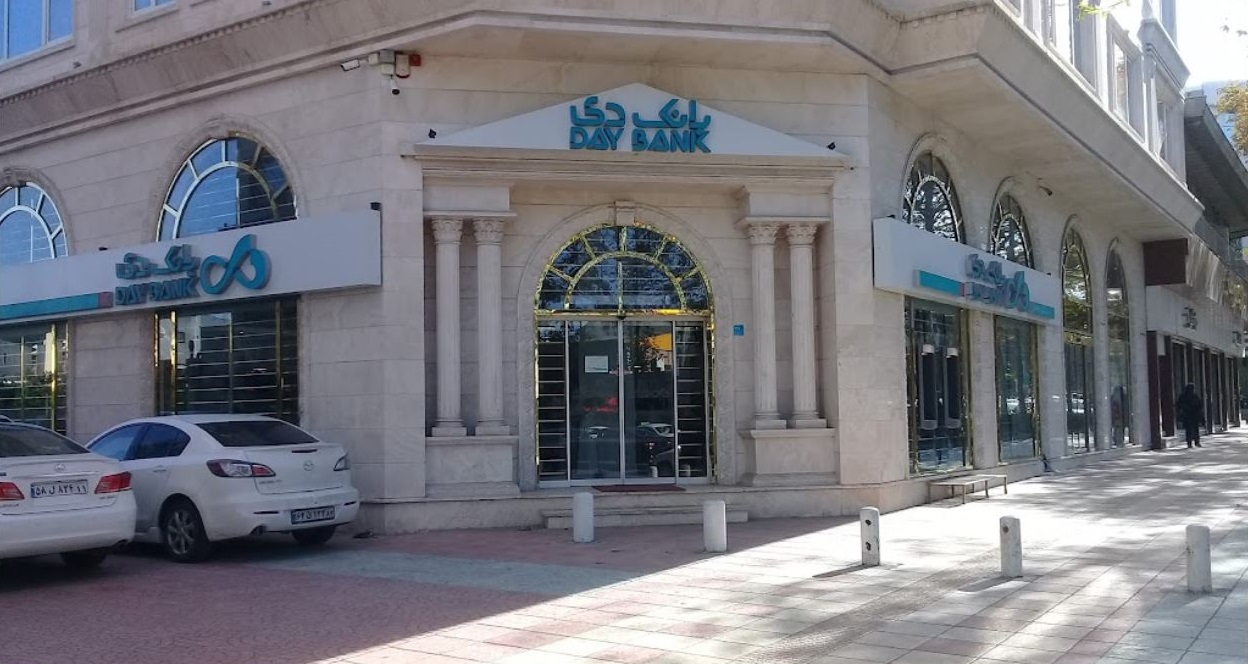
Day Bank of Amol

Bank Day shares have been floated on the Over-the-Counter market and measures are being taken in order to become listed in the Tehran Stock Exchange.

Despite its relatively short life, Bank Day is also successfully penetrating the increasingly competitive Iranian financial market. Market acquisition may be reflected in the increasing number of Day Bank’s branches, over the previous four years.

== International banking ==
Bank Day is a member of the SWIFT transaction system, which facilitates worldwide bank transfers.

== Sponsorship ==
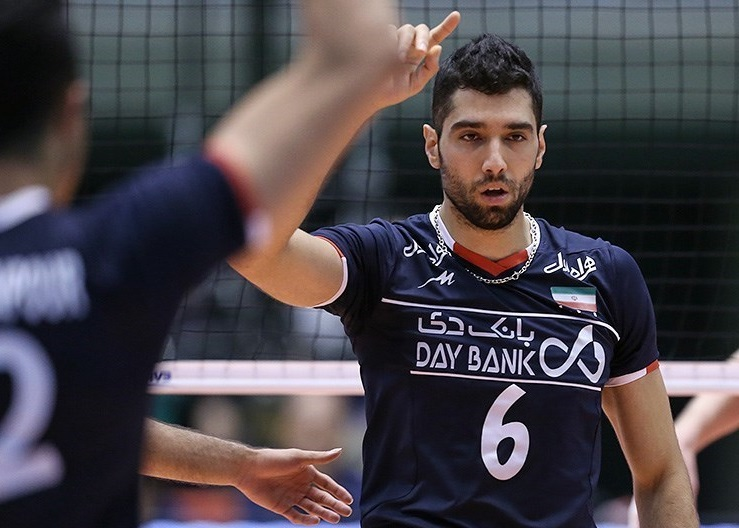
Iran national team played named shirt sponsor

Bank Day was a 2016 sponsor of Iran National Volleyball Teams & Federation.

== See also ==
- Banking in Iran
