= Parsian Bank =

Iranian banking and financial services corporation

Parsian Financial Group
- Type: Public company
- Traded as: TSE: BPAR1; ISIN: IRO1BPAR0009
- Industry: Financial services
- Founded: 2002
- Headquarters: Iran, Tehran
- Area served: Iran
- Key people: Yahya Froutan (CEO)
- Products: Credit cards, consumer banking, corporate banking, investment banking, asset management
- Website: https://en.parsian-bank.ir/

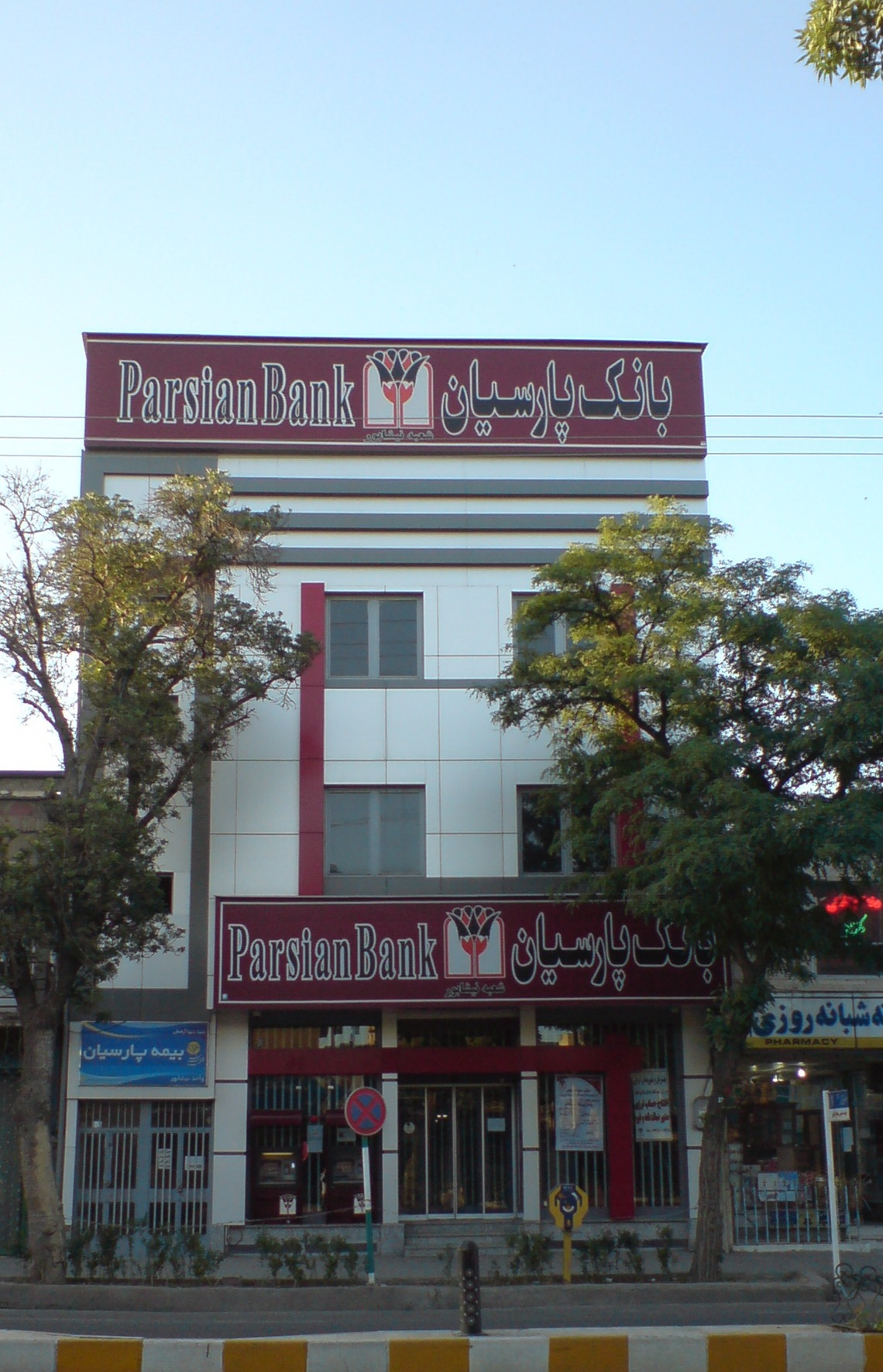
One of the Parsian bank branch in the Nishapur

Parsian Bank (Persian: بانک پارسیان, Bānk-e Pārsiān) is a major Iranian private bank, headquartered in Tehran, Iran. In addition to traditional banking services, Parsian also offers diversified services such as insurance and car rentals. According to investigation by Iran international, the bank controlled by Supreme Leader’s business empire.

== History ==
Parsian Bank was founded in July 2001, and opened for business in 2002. It entered the Tehran Stock Exchange in 2004. Reuters news agency describes the bank as "Iran's largest non-state bank" in 2006, known for offering slightly higher interest rates on accounts than state-run banks, financing of as much as 80% of a property's value, so that financing was a real option for many new homebuyers, and its liberal dress code. This started to change in 2005, when Parsian's managing director, Abdollah Talebi, refused to give Mohammad Shariatmadari (head of the powerful Setade Ejraiye Farmane Emam foundation at the time), an unsecured $44 million loan (Shariatmadari had offered no collateral for the loan).

In early 2006 the bank faced severe financial difficulties due to a forced interest rate change imposed upon the banking sector by the Iranian President, Mahmoud Ahmadinejad. Until then, the bank's strategy had required providing long term fixed high interest accounts, however when interest rates were slashed the income providing loans that Parsian was receiving ended up at a lower rate than the rates it was paying out in the long term savings accounts, thus creating a cashflow problem. The problems are still unresolved as of October 2006.

According to Saeed Laylaz, economic and political observer in Tehran,

"One reason for Ahmadinejad's antagonism to Parsian Bank was that he thought the bank was owned by the family of Ayatollah Hashemi Rafsanjani, his main rival in the presidential elections. After Ahmadinejad took office, Abdollah Talebi [Parsian CEO], an outspoken reformist, sent a list of the shareholders to the President to prove that was untrue. The bank is a symbol of bourgeoisie for Ahmadinejad".

Subsequently, according to Reuters, Tadbir Investment Co, (a subsidiary of Setad) acquired a small stake in Parsian and despite being a minority owner transformed the bank, bringing in new managers and among other things eliminating the lacks dress code.

On 19 September, 1.44 million shares of the bank traded on the Tehran Stock Exchange. The shares, worth a total of about $320 million, were bought by a single customer. The shares – which comprised about 29% of the Bank's total shares – belonged to Iran Khodro Industrial Group (A government company). The bank has still not publicly named the new owners of the stake.

In September 2010, a 10% stake in Parsian E-Commerce, the online banking subsidiary of Parsian Bank, was sold on the Iranian Over-The-Counter (OTC) market. The IPO was worth $116 million.

According to a 2026 investigation by Iran international, Persian Bank has been effectively controlled by Setad, a business conglomerate over seen by Iran's Supreme Leader. Through affiliated companies, Setad held more than 42% of the bank's shares by March 2026 and exercised influence over the appointment of its board members.

== Chairman and board of directors ==
Source:

== See also ==
- Banking and insurance in Iran
- Islamic Banking
