= Privatization in Iran =

According to the Fourth Five-Year Economic Development Plan (2005–2010), the Privatization Organization of Iran affiliated with the Ministry of Economic Affairs and Finance is in charge of setting prices and ceding shares to the general public and on the Tehran Stock Exchange. The privatization effort is primarily backed by reformist members of the Iranian government and society who hope that privatization can bring about economic and social change.

In 2007, Supreme Leader Ayatollah Khamenei requested that government officials speed up implementation of the policies outlined in the amendment of Article 44, and move towards economic privatization. Khamenei also suggested that ownership rights should be protected in courts set up by the Justice Ministry; the hope was that this new protection would give an additional measure of security and encourage private investment. Despite these statements, true official backing for privatization remains very slow due to political reasons.

Some 80 percent of the companies subject to Article 44 of the Constitution would be transferred to public ownership, 40 percent of which will be conducted through the "Justice Shares" Scheme and the rest through the Tehran Stock Exchange. The government will keep the title of the remaining 20 percent.

It is widely believed that if current governmental organizations are privatized they will need to become more efficient. At present many are not profitable due to large numbers of unnecessary employees hired by the government to reduce unemployment. Furthermore, many of these companies are subsidized by oil revenues. True privatization will inevitably lead to many unpopular job cuts and large scale lay offs.

The writer Kaveh Ehsani of an article on privatization in Iran says: "the absence of transparency and accountability, in all likelihood, “privatization” of public assets will replace state monopolies with equally unaccountable private monopolies and multi-national capital, without necessarily benefiting “the public” in a discernible way."

The current privatization effort calls for an initial public offering (IPO) of five percent of the firms being privatized. Once the five percent is public, it will establish a base market price for future offerings. According to a study conducted by the IMF in 18 countries, privatization adds 2 percent to the government's GDP per annum.

== The Iranian constitution ==
According to the Article 44 of the Iranian Constitution, the economy of Iran is to consist of three sectors: state, cooperative, and private; and is to be based on systematic and sound planning.

- The state sector is to include all large-scale industries, foreign trade, major minerals, banking, insurance, power generation, dams and large-scale irrigation networks, radio and television, post, telegraph and telephone services, aviation, shipping, roads, railroads and the like; all these will be publicly owned and administered by the State.
- The cooperative sector is to include cooperative companies (Bonyad) and enterprises concerned with production and distribution, in urban and rural areas, in accordance with Islamic criteria.
- The private sector consists of those activities concerned with construction, agriculture, animal husbandry, industry, trade, and services that supplement the economic activities of the state and cooperative sectors.

A strict interpretation of the above has never been enforced in the Islamic Republic and the private sector has been able to play a much larger role than is outlined in the Constitution. In recent years, the role of the private sector has been further on the increase. Furthermore, an amendment of the article in 2004 has allowed 80 percent of state assets to be privatized (ref: Note C, article 44 of Constitution).

== Background ==
Value of shares divested by IPO (2001–2015)
1. Tehran Stock Exchange (48.5%)
2. Tender (38.5%)
3. Iran Fara Bourse (12.8%)
4. Negotiation (0.20%)

=== Iranian Revolution and Iran–Iraq War (1979–88) ===
In July 1979, six months after the victory of the Revolution, 28 private banks that held 43.9 percent of the total assets of all the Iranian banks in their possession, were declared nationalized by the government. At the same time, all the car-making, copper, steel and aluminum industries, as well as the assets of 51 capitalists and major industrialists and their next of kin were declared nationalized by the government. In 1982, Mostazafen Foundation of Islamic Revolution alone came to possess 203 manufacturing and industrial factories, 472 big agricultural fields, 101 major construction firms, 238 trade and services companies and 2,786 big plots of real estates.

Immediately following the outbreak of the Iran–Iraq War over 80% of Iran's economy came under the control of the government. This created numerous problems for Iran as previously internationally competitive companies, such as Iran Air or Iran Khodro, degraded into basic domestic companies that could barely function without massive government subsidies – primarily derived from oil revenues.

=== Rafsanjani government (1989–97) ===
After the Iran–Iraq War in 1988, the Iranian government under Rafsanjani, declared its intention to privatize most state industries in an effort to stimulate the ailing economy. The sale of state-owned factories and companies proceeded slowly, however (mostly because of the opposition in Majlis), and most industries remained state-owned in the early 21st century (70% of the economy as of 2006). The majority of heavy industry—including steel, petrochemicals, copper, automobiles, and machine tools—was in the public sector, while most light industry was privately owned.

=== Khatami government (1997–2005) ===
In 2004, under the presidency of reformist Mohammad Khatami a number of efforts were made to eliminate the role of the government: The Tehran Stock Exchange was re-launched, which allowed a mechanism for trading shares of government companies. Elements of the constitution (article 44) that decreed that core-infrastructure should remain state run were eliminated, and private banks were launched.

Despite plans to sell billions worth of state assets to the private sector, uptake was very slow. A common criticism of the privatization effort by investors was the only local Iranian organizations that are capable of buying the large share blocks are themselves government owned. Also analysts have blamed international fears about the Iranian nuclear programme and an absence of transparency and information reporting for the lack of enthusiasm for state assets. In 2005, Iran tried to sell $2.5bn of government assets but only managed to offload less than 30 per cent. At present, at least 20 percent of the companies slated for selloff are officially loss-making. While the rest have earned an average profit of 5.5 percent in recent years, that figure does not take into account the extensive political and economic incentives and monopoly protections that they enjoy.

=== Ahmadinejad government (2005–2013) ===
In July 2006, Supreme Leader Ayatollah Khamenei decreed a renewed effort to privatize the economy and said in his order that “ceding 80 per cent of the shares of large companies will serve to bring about economic development, social justice and the elimination of poverty”. The decree is also an effort to revive Iran's stalled privatization programme and kick-start the country's many uncompetitive industries, which are heavily protected by subsidies.

In February 2008, Iran announced that 3 newly formed Investment Banks (AminIB, Novin and Pasargad Bank) will take share subscriptions and act as an intermediary between the Privatization Organization and the stock exchange, helping Iran divest state-owned enterprises.

Close to 370 trillion rials worth of shares of firms covered by Article 44 of the Constitution have been sold to the private sector from 2006 to 2009. The value of government assets are between 1,000 and 1,100 trillion rials ($110 billion), one third of which have been ceded to the private sector (December 2008).

In 2009 it was reported that 30 percent of the revenues obtained from ceding the ownership of state entities within the framework of Article 44 of the Constitution are allocated to the nationwide cooperatives.

As of 2009, Iran has privatized $63 billion worth of government equity in state-owned firms since 2005 (out of $120 billion). Subsequently, the disinvestment has brought the government's direct ownership in the GDP from 80% down to 40%. However, privatization through the Tehran Stock Exchange has tended to involve the sale of state-owned enterprises to other state actors such as pension funds.

The Iranian Government announced in 2010 that it aims to raise some $12.5 billion by privatizing more than 500 state-owned firms. The money raised through privatization of the firms will be spent on paying the state's debts.

The Iranian President Mahmoud Ahmadinejad is beside the privatizations that happened under his government an anti-capitalist.

=== Rouhani government (2013–2021) ===
Iran's government was due to privatize 27 huge companies, 76 large companies, 31 medium companies, and 31 companies of other sizes in 2014. Huge companies are those companies with the shares value of over 10 trillion rials (about $403 million) and large companies are those with the shares value of over one trillion rials (about $40 million). As of November 2014, the value of shares transferred over the mentioned 1.5 years (about $9.2 billion) is tantamount to the value of shares transferred since the establishment of the organization 12.5 years ago.

As of 2016, regarding privatizations conducted by the IPO, 25% of such entities were divested to the Civil Servants Pension Organization, 15% to the Farmers, Villagers and Nomads’ Social Insurance Fund and 25% to the Social Security Organization and only 5% to the "real private sector".

For years it has been the country's position to privatize 80% of all power plants. As of August 17, 2017 Energy Minister Hamid Chitchian has said that 55% of all power plants have completed privatization. The country aims to clinch international contracts in order to aid in attracting much needed investment.

== "Justice shares" plan ==
Privatization shares distribution
1. "Justice shares" (40.0%)
2. Tehran Stock Exchange/(IPO) (35.0%)
3. Workers (5.00%)
4. Government (20.0%)

The government has approved a plan to offer shares to low-income families, starting with the poorest. Under the “Justice Shares“ plan, millions of Iranian families will receive shares in state-owned firms, the value of which will be reimbursed in 20 years from the dividends generated by those shares. The project is in line with President Mahmoud Ahmadinejad's election promise to improve the condition of Iran's poor. Ahmadinejad in July 2005 promised to distribute shares to Iranian families, adding that these shares would be from state-run companies that must be privatized. Justice shares are valued at $36 billion as of 2014.

=== Implementation ===
The poorest strata of society shall receive justice shares at a 50 percent discount and will pay the said amount in 10-year instalments. Villagers and nomads shall have priority in this respect. The holding period for those shares is a minimum of 2 years [afterwards]. Those covered by charity services rendered by the Imam Khomeini Relief Committee and the State Welfare Organizations as well as the jobless war veterans are prioritised in the first phase of the justice shares initiative. In the second phase, rural population and tribesmen will receive the shares.

Directives on identifying those eligible to receive justice shares (in the second phase) have been issued and the shares will be distributed (among the rural residents and the tribesmen) after receiving their national code number. Up to 6.5 million rural residents who qualify for the shares have been identified and that 1.2 million more people are yet to complete their documents. The Government is promoting the shareholding culture in Iran. The total number of shareholders has reached 700,000 people and this figure is expected to reach 24-25 million. In December 2006, the Government informed that some 4.6 million low-income Iranians had received Justice shares worth $2.5 billion as part of the privatization scheme. Each person received around $550 in shares with a maximum of five payments for each family.

In February 2008 the Iranian Economic Ministry announced that some 15 million rural people out of 23 million are entitled to justice shares by the next Iranian year (to start March 20, 2008). In November 2008 Iran announced that some 22.5 million people have received justice shares. However, in 2009 labor leaders complained that workers had received hardly any. More than seven million people have been categorized in the lowest-income bracket. By mid-June 2009, it was reported that almost 40 million people had received justice shares. As of 2020, some 49 million Iranians have Justice Shares. Beneficiaries of justice shares could not trade the shares and received a small part of the dividends between 2018 ad 2020.

As of 2020, shareholders have the new option to either directly gain the ownership of their shares and sell it in the stock exchange, or let the investment companies manage their portfolio as in the past. The Justice Share portfolio includes 49 state-owned companies in the auto, metal, mining, and agriculture, petrochemical and banking sectors. Central Securities Depository of Iran as the sole entity is in charge of registry, depository and clearinghouse of Iran's capital market, so the responsibility for the implementation of this mega project was assigned to this company while the Supreme Council of the Stock Exchange was responsible for introducing the necessary regulations to facilitate the executive affairs.

== Criticism ==
Some observers have argued that this "privatization" is modeled on the voucher distribution programs of Russia and Czechoslovakia in the 1990s, which, at least in the case of Russia, led to the rise of the oligarchs. The Ministry of Economic Affairs and Finance (Iran) has announced that it was forming a special committee to facilitate the process of making Justice Shares tradable on the stock exchange.

== Shares for workers ==
As part of a policy of transferring shares of state firms to employees (5% of privatization proceeds), 20 million shares valued at 18.5 billion rials were transferred during September and October 2008, including to employees of Satkab, Iranian Mines and Mining Industries Development and Renovation Organization, and subsidiaries of the Industrial Development and Renovation Organization.

== Iranian expatriates' role ==
Privatization drive may gain further momentum if Iranian expatriates increase investment in their motherland. Iranian nationals residing abroad are holding significant assets. Many have invested their capital in other countries, following the 1979 Islamic Revolution and the 1980–1988 war. Statistics at hand suggest that close to $10 billion (of goods) were re-exported into Iran last year. Multinational companies, particularly Iranian firms mostly owned and controlled by Islamic Revolutionary Guard Corps, are involved in export of goods into the country from Dubai. There are differing estimates of the expatriates' total capital (1.3 trillion dollars), but what is clear is that it is so huge that it will be enough to buy shares of all state companies. In Dubai alone, Iranian expatriates are estimated to have invested up to $200 billion. If 10 percent of this capital arrives, things will change drastically in Iran.

=== Investments ===
In 2000, the Iran Press Service reported that Iranian expatriates had invested between $200 and $400 billion in the United States, Europe, and China, but almost nothing in Iran. The Iranian government's efforts to encourage foreign investment from Iranians in the United States were thwarted in 1997 when President Bill Clinton issued an executive order prohibiting investments in Iran (ILSA). Nevertheless, FIPPA provisions apply to all foreign investors, and many Iranian expatriates based in the US continue to make substantial investments in Iran.

=== Expatriate fund ===
The government has proposed setting up a joint investment fund with $5 billion in basic capital and an economic union to serve Iranians living abroad. The stated goal is to attract investment from Iranian expatriates and using their experience in stimulating foreign investments. Later, in 2010, it was announced that Iran will start the process by creating a national fund with a basic capital of eight million euros. This fund will later transform into a bank.

== Foreign investment ==
Foreign investors can bid in Iranian privatization tenders, but need permission from the Economy Ministry on a case-by-case basis. Iran has announced it will begin to allow foreign firms to purchase Iranian state-run companies, with the possibility of obtaining full ownership.

=== Offshore fund ===
A subsidiary of Iran's largest bank, Melli Investment Bank with branches in Dubai (UAE) and London, plans to launch a fund of up to $300 million to invest in the Tehran Stock Exchange, providing an alternative venue for foreigners to invest in the Iranian economy. The market, with a capitalisation of $37 billion, is trading at a fraction of the earnings multiples enjoyed by Iran's neighbours, while average earnings continue to grow at about 25 per cent a year. The fund will be composed of blue chip companies like Iran Khodro and will be based in the Cayman Island and managed from Iran.

== Top 100 Iranian companies ==
The ranking has been assessed by Iran Industrial Management Company for the past 10 years. Based on financial statements for March 2005–06, the '100 top Iranian corporations' were ranked and announced in a conference in early 2007. According to the economic expert in charge of the rankings, the main index considered was the sales of companies because "Sales figure indicates the growth of a corporation".

According to the same survey, while 67 percent of the firms have experienced a decline in profit margin, car manufacturers, cement factories, investment institutions and banks have had an increase in the same index. The Iranian year March 2005-06 was a good year for these industries.

Meanwhile, the Persian daily Ettelaat named the top five corporations as follows: Industrial Development and Renovation Organization (IDRO) ranking first with an asset of 112,658 billion rials followed by Iran Khodro Industrial Group with an asset of 65,971 billion rials, Mining Industries Development and Renovation Organization (IMIDRO) with 52,184 billion rials, SAIPA car factory with 40,528 billion rials and National Iranian Petrochemical Company with 32,024 billion rials. They were followed by SAPCO, Bank Melli Iran, Bank Saderat Iran, Mobarakeh Steel Co. and Bank Mellat taking the sixth to tenth positions.

Latest statistics show that the number of companies worth over one billion dollars on Tehran Stock Exchange (listed companies only) has reached 12. Among them are National Iranian Copper Industries Company (NICIC shares are worth $5.2 billion), Kharg Petrochemical Company, Ghadir petrochemical companies, Khuzestan Steel Company, Power Plant Projects Management Company (MAPNA), Retirement Investment Firm, Metal and Mine Investment Companies, Gol-Gohar Iron Ore Company ($2.1 billion), and Chadormalu Mining and Industrial Company.

=== Valuation ===
The assets of the top 100 Iranian publicly traded corporations — not including the National Iranian Oil Company and affiliated companies, various IDRO-affiliated companies, the Defense Industries Organization, Iran Air and the Iran Aviation Industries Organization — add up to $86 billion, which is less than that of a corporation such as Microsoft. But this does not account for goodwill that likely increases the real assets value of those same companies to more than one trillion US dollars.

== Major companies listed for privatization ==
Of 1,000 companies awaiting the cabinet's approval, 240 companies had the green light already to be privatized by March 2008. As of 2014, Iran had also 930 industrial parks and zones, of which 731 are ready to be ceded to the private sector.

=== Banking and insurance ===
Most smaller state banks will be open to flotation, but excluded key banks including the Central Bank of Iran, Bank Melli Iran, Sepah Bank of Iran, Bank of Industry and Mines, Bank of Agriculture, Housing Bank (Bank Maskan) and the Export Development Bank of Iran. The privatization-bound banks are Tejarat, Mellat, Refah, Saderat, and Post Bank (ceding 100 percent of stakes of all 5 banks).

Insurance companies Asia, Dana and Alborz will be listed on the stock exchange in 2009 after review and improvement in their financial accounts, internal regulations, organizational structure and dispersion nationwide. In 2008, the total insurance premiums generated in Iran were $4.3 billion. This is less than 0.1% of the world's total, while Iran has approximately 1% of the world's population. The insurance penetration rate is approximately 1.4%, significantly below the global average of 7.5%. This underdevelopment is also evident in product diversity. Approximately 60% of all insurance premiums are generated from car insurance. Also, 95% of all premiums come from general insurance contracts and only 5% relate to life products. Payout ratios have shown consistent growth over the years. Last year, the industry average payout ratio was 86%.

=== Industry ===
102 companies out of the total 130, affiliated with IDRO, were due to be privatized by March 2009 Leading automakers Iran Khodro and Saipa were also due to be privatized in March 2008. In July 2010, the government sold a further 18% stake in both Iran Khodro and Saipa for about $2 billion in total, bringing down its participation in both companies to about 20%. Shares of Iran Tractor Manufacturing Company have also been offered on the Tehran Stock Exchange as part of an IPO.

=== Utilities ===
Mapna Company. Sahand, Bistoun, Shazand (Arak), Shahid Montazeri, Tous, Shahid Rajaei and Neishabour power stations are among the profit-making plants, work on privatizing them will be finalized by late March 2007. Jahrom, Khalij-e Fars (Persian Gulf) and Sahand power plants will be ceded to the private sector in 2009. All domestic power plants will be privatized gradually, except those the government feels it should run to ensure security of the national electricity grid. Power plants of Damavand, Mashhad, Shirvan, Kerman, Khalij-e Fars, Abadan, Bisotoon, Sanandaj, Manjil and Binalood, which have been turned into public limited firms, are ready for privatization. As of 2010, 20 power plants were ready for privatization in Iran. Upon ceding the 20 power plants to IPO, some 40 percent of the capacity of power plants nationwide will be assigned to the private and cooperative sectors.

=== Mines & metals ===
National Iranian Copper Industries Co.(NICICO), Mobarakeh Steel Co., Khuzestan Steel Company, Isfahan Steel Mills, Iranian Aluminum Company (IRALCO), Ehdas Sanat Company (ESC) and Iran Alloy Stell Co. are all candidates for privatization. The Privatization Organization of Iran announced that Iranian Aluminum Co. and Bushehr Cement Co. would be privatized in June 2007. The steel, cement and iron ore prices are currently being liberalized in Iran.

=== Transport ===
As planned, all airline companies except for Civil Aviation Organization as well as Ports and Shipping Organization should be ceded to the people. This covers flag carrier Iran Air and its affiliate Iran Aseman Airlines. The fast-growing Islamic Republic of Iran Shipping Lines has also been lobbying for more independence. The government has agreed to offer the shares of Iran Post Company in the bourse (2008). The National Iranian Tanker Company's shares have been offered to the private sector in 2009. In 2009 Iran announced that Imam Khomeini port, its biggest port in the Persian Gulf, will be privatized. Bandar Abbas has also been listed for privatization.

=== Telecommunication ===
In 2006, the Ministry of Communications and Information Technology announced that it will float the shares of affiliated companies such as Mobile Telecommunications Company in the stock market.

Under the general policies of Article 44, telecom companies are categorised in four groups as follows:

- Group One: Among the 30 provincial telecom networks, the fixed telecom networks pertain to those of Tehran, Isfahan, Fars, Hamedan, Ahvaz, Khorasan Razavi, Khuzestan and East Azarbaijan. The first group concerns fixed line telecom networks, including those in the public sector with 30 subsidiary telecom networks in provinces. The non-governmental sector includes companies such as Iraphone, Novin, Zahi Kish, Kouh-e Nour, Montazeran Adlgostar and Pouya Ertebat with each having hundreds of thousands of subscribers.
- Group Two: The second group concerns mobile telephone networks. In the public sector, they include the Telecommunication Company of Iran (TCI) to be privatized by March 2008. In the non-governmental sector, they include telecommunications companies such as Omran Kish, Isfahan, Rafsanjan Complex and Irancell.
- Group Three: There is only one public network in the data network sector, namely Data and Telecommunications Company of Iran, which is considered a basic telecom network in terms of mobile networks and Shomal IT Company. In the non-governmental sector, there are over 100 companies with a shared data network.
- Group Four: The subsidiary telecom network named Subsidiary Telecommunications Company is another basic telecom network. They are completely owned by the state and not targeted for privatization.

In 2009, 51% of TCI was sold to Mobin Trust Consortium, a consortium belonging to the Iranian Revolutionary Guard Corps for the sum of $7.8 billion.

=== Oil, gas and petrochemicals ===
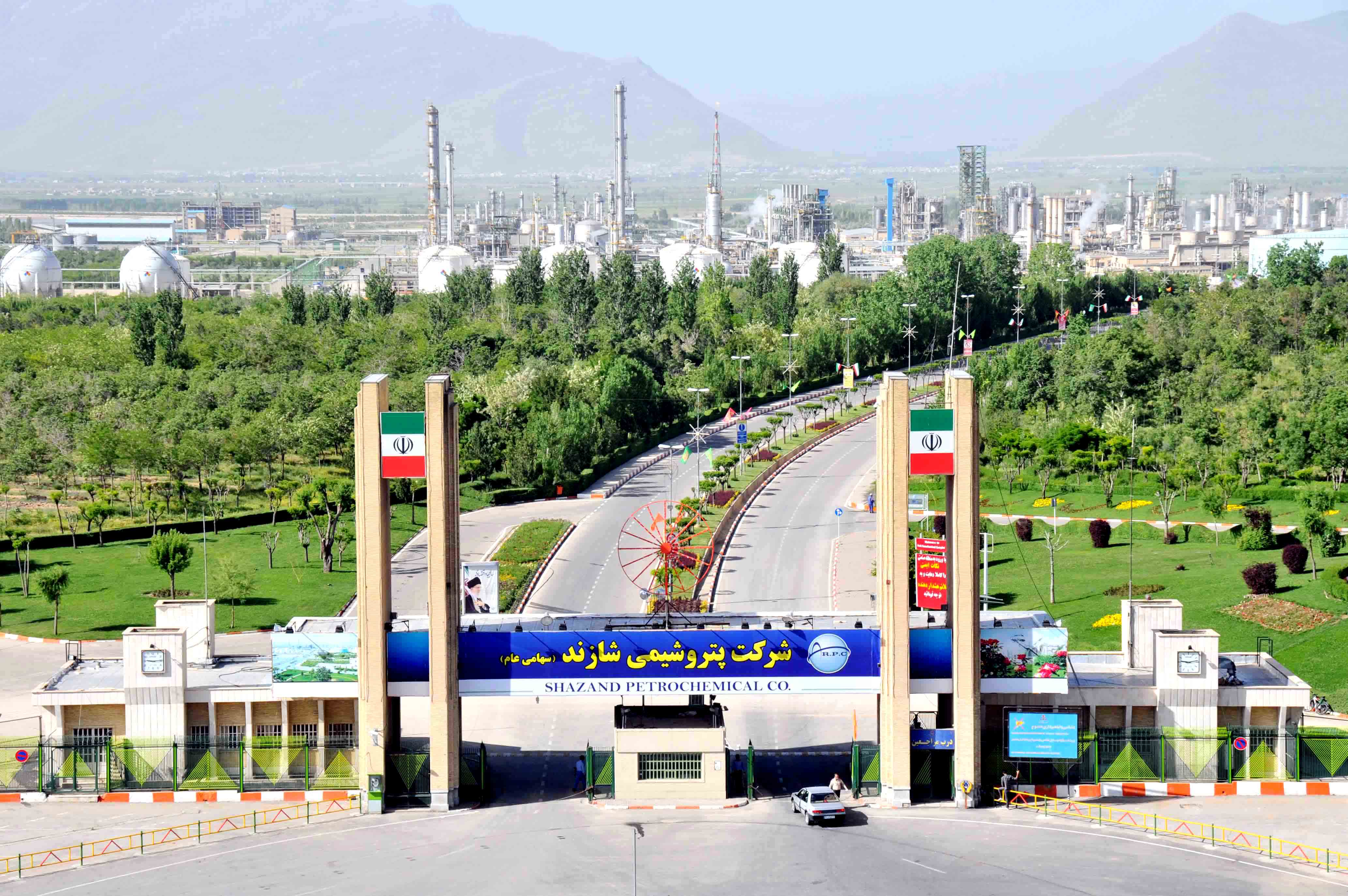
Arak Petrochemical company

- According to the Supreme Leader of Iran the downstream oil and gas sectors will be privatized, excluding the upstream oil and gas industry, the National Iranian Oil Company, the state companies involved in exploration and the production of crude oil and gas. Iran's Oil Ministry plans to cede shares of 95 percent of its affiliated companies to the private sector. Just 7 out of 142 subsidiaries of the Ministry of Petroleum have been excluded from the privatization process.
- Some shares will be dual-listed on regional foreign stock exchanges to attract expatriate investors. A list of 21 companies to be privatized will be released by mid-2007. Of these companies, five belong to National Iranian Oil Company (NIOC), nine to National Iranian Petrochemical Company (NPC), five are affiliates of National Iranian Gas Company (NIGC), and two of National Iranian Oil Refining and Distribution Company (NIORDC), including the Abadan Refinery. National Iranian Gas Company, the Iranian Oil Terminals Company and the National Iranian Oil Products Distribution Company are also on the list. Iranian Oil Terminals Co., a division of the National Iranian Oil Co., has four transport hubs that load more than 2,000 oil tankers per year.
- Iran is to target foreign investment in its energy sector by creating an umbrella group of nearly 50 state-run firms and listing its shares on four international stock exchanges. Under the privatization plan, 47 oil and gas companies (including PetroIran and North Drilling Company) worth an estimated $90 billion are to be privatized on the Tehran Stock Exchange by 2014.
- Iran's National Petrochemical Company (NPC) plans to privatize 17 companies by the end of 2007. Forty percent of those shares will go to "Justice Shares" for underprivileged citizens in Iran. 20% will be allocated to NPC. 35% will be put on sale on the Tehran Stock Exchange and the remaining 5% will go the petrochemical industry personnel. The 20 percent allocated to the NPC is meant to support petrochemical industry projects but may be offered to the private sector in the future. 89.6 percent of Shiraz Petrochemical Complex, and 27.76 percent of Petrochemical Investment Company will be sold to the public in June 2009. All shares of domestic petrochemical firms will be offered to the public in the frame of a holding company by the end of Iranian year (ending March 21, 2010). As part of the 2010 Iranian Economic Reform Plan, petrochemical companies, which use natural gas as their feedstock (rather than fuel), will pay no more than 65% of the average export price (rather than 75% for the general population) for a period of 10 years.
- Iran also projects to privatize some of its oil refineries (2009). Isfahan, Bandar Abbas, Tabriz, Shiraz, Kermanshah, Lavan, and Tehran (Shahid Tondgouyan) oil refineries will be transferred to the private sector but the ownership of Abadan and Arak oil refineries will remain in government control.
- The government of Iran announced in 2017 that a vast majority of the country's 3,600 gas and diesel stations along with 2,400 CNG stations would be privatized in order improve service and raise accountability. On August 8, 2017, a European firm based jointly in Greece and Romania announced it was planning to commercialize a number of stations. The deal is expected to grow economic ties between the EU and Iran.

== See also ==
- Organization for Collection and Sale of State-owned Properties of Iran (OCSSPI)
- Economy of Iran
- International Rankings of Iran in Economy
- Iranian Economic Reform Plan
- Labor and tax laws in Iran
- List of Major Iranian Companies
- Next Eleven
- Tehran Stock Exchange
- Transition economy
