= Karafarin Bank =

Bank in Iran

- Type: Public
- Traded as: TSE: KRAF1; ISIN: IRO1KRAF0000
- Industry: Banking
- Founded: 2001; 25 years ago
- Headquarters: Tehran, Iran
- Key people: Ahmad Baharvandi (CEO)
- Products: Credit cards, consumer banking, corporate banking, investment banking, mortgage loans, private banking, wealth management
- Services: Commercial Banking
- Revenue: ▲€800 million EUR (2017)
- Number of employees: 1850
- Website: karafarinbank.ir

The Karafarin Bank (Persian: بانک کارآفرین, Bānk-e Kārāfarin), which translates to Entrepreneurship Bank is a private bank in Iran. Established in 2001, it is now one of Iran's leading private banks and also the first private bank to be established since the Iranian revolution in 1979.

== History ==
The Karafarin Bank was initially established as the Karafarinan Credit Institute. It is the first truly privately owned bank in Iran established since the 1979 Iranian Revolution. Its shareholders are among the industrialists and contractors in Iran. Many of them are members of the Association of Industrial Managers of Iran, Association of Construction Engineers of Iran, Association of Utility Engineers, and Consulting Engineers and Architects.

With an initial capital of 30 Billion Rials, the Credit Institute received its operating permit from the Central Bank of Iran on December 1, 1999. About 85% of the capital was contributed by the founding shareholders and the balance was offered to the general public, which was taken up within days.

The Institution was incorporated on December 9, 1999 (equivalent to 18/9/1378 in Iranian calendar) under registration number 157915. Pursuant to the approval by the Extraordinary General Assembly of the Shareholders dated February 15, 2000 (26/11/1379), and the preliminary agreement of the Supervision Department of the Central Bank on September 22, 2001 (31/6/1380), the process of converting the Credit Institute into a bank began. New articles of association was adopted; the paid-up capital was increased in two stages to 200 Billion Rials (just over $25 million); and, shares of those shareholders who did not take advantage of their primitive rights (with respect to the seasoned equity offering) were sold to new shareholders.

The Institution was officially converted into a bank on January 1, 2001 (11/10/1380), thus creating the first privately owned bank since 1979.

== Branches ==
As of December 2011, the bank had 108 branches within Iran.

== See also ==
- Banking in Iran
