= Post Bank of Iran =

Iranian post banking and financial services corporation

- Company type: Government owned
- Traded as: TSE: BPST1; ISIN: IRO1BPST0007
- Industry: Financial services
- Founded: 1996
- Headquarters: Tehran, Iran
- Key people: Behzad Shiri (CEO)
- Products: Banking
- Website: www.postbank.ir

Post Bank of Iran (Persian: پست بانک ایران, Post Bank Iran) is an Iranian bank.

== History ==
Post Bank of Iran was formally established in 1996. It is the eleventh state owned bank in Iran.

In 2024, IRLeaks launched a cyberattack on Iran's banking sector, affecting 20 of the country's 29 banks, including the Post Bank of Iran and the Central Bank of Iran. Politico referred to it as the "worst attack" in Iran's history.

== International issues ==
On 6 September 2013, the European General Court in Luxembourg ruled to annul the European Union (EU) sanctions in place since 2010 against the bank on grounds of supporting the Iranian nuclear and missile programs, as EU governments had not proved the accusations against the bank. As of 2016, the EU asset freeze was still in effect.

== See also ==
- Banking and insurance in Iran
- Privatization in Iran
