= Bank Shahr =

Iranian banking and financial services corporation

Shahr Bank

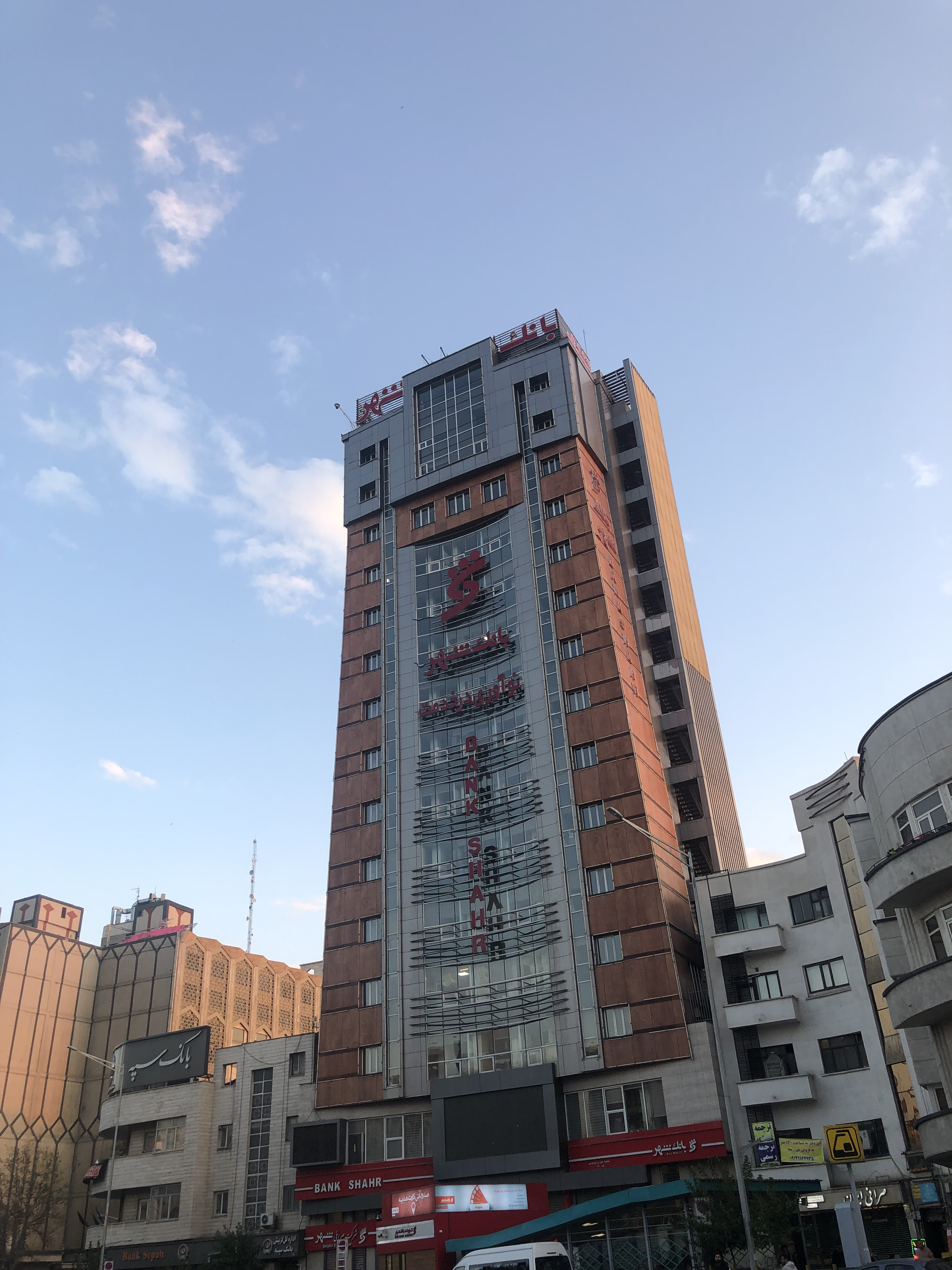
- The branch of Shahr Bank in Ferdowsi Square, Tehran.
- Company type: Public
- Traded as: وشهر
- Industry: Financial services and investment (IRR and foreign currencies)
- Founded: February 2009
- Headquarters: Iran, Tehran, Ferdowsi Square
- Key people: Barat Karimi (chairman); Mohammad Mehdi Ahmadi
- Services: All financial services provided by the bank and its subsidiaries
- Owners: Tehran Municipality; Mashhad Municipality; Karaj Municipality; Qom Municipality; Shiraz Municipality; Qazvin Municipality; Tehran Municipality Employees' Reserve Fund; Tehran Municipality Retirement Fund; Shahriar Cooperative Production and Distribution Company; Other natural and legal persons
- Number of employees: More than 4,000
- Website: www.shahr-bank.ir

Shahr Bank is one of the private banks in Iran that officially started its operations on February 9, 2009. In the past, this bank provided financial services under the names "Honarvaran Shahr Cooperative" and "Shahr Credit Cooperative."

Shahr Bank was founded by the Tehran Municipality, and its shares are primarily owned by municipalities of various cities and metropolitan areas, municipal employees, and a portion of the Iranian public.

In 2014, it recorded the highest resource growth among private banks. The bank has branches in many cities of Iran.

== History ==
The Shahr Credit and Financial Institution was established with authorization from the Central Bank and with shares owned by the municipalities of Tehran and other Iranian metropolitan areas. It started its official operations on February 9, 2009, with an initial capital of 1.5 trillion Iranian rials.

The main motivation behind establishing this bank was to meet municipalities' need for large-scale financing, liquidity, and capital to cover urban development costs, aiming for self-sufficiency in urban management.

After extensive efforts by senior managers of Tehran Municipality and other metropolitan areas, and with an increase in capital by shareholders to 2 trillion rials, the Central Bank, in coordination with the High Council of Money and Credit, approved the registration of Shahr Bank on February 8, 2010. The bank officially opened on March 8, 2010.

Two years after its establishment, the shareholders raised the bank’s capital to 4 trillion rials to provide necessary liquidity. This amount remained until 2013, when the capital increased to 7.9 trillion rials in July. By December 2015, it had reached 15.573 trillion rials.

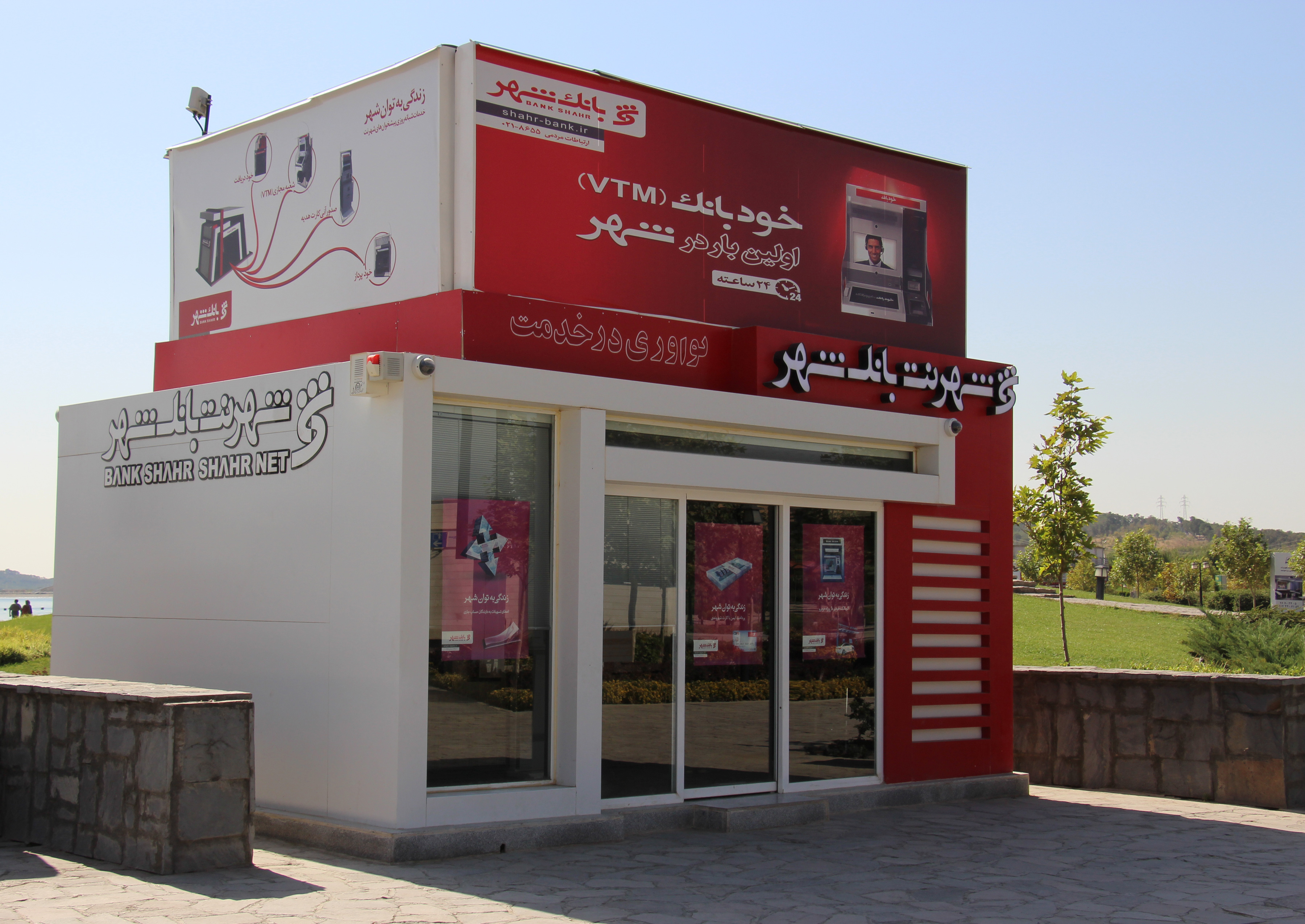
Shahr Bank kiosks in public areas
