= Refah Bank =

Iranian banking and financial services corporation

- Type: Public company
- Industry: Bank
- Founded: 1960
- Headquarters: Tehran, Iran
- Key people: Esmaeil Lalegani, CEO
- Products: Retail banking Transaction accounts Insurance; Stock Brokerage; Investment bank Asset-based lending Consumer finance Trade; International payments Foreign exchange
- Net income: ▲$392 million (2023)
- Total assets: ▲$11.3 billion (2023)
- Number of employees: 10,774(full-time)
- Parent: Social Security Organization
- Website: www.refah-bank.ir

Refah Kargaran Bank, also known as Refah Bank (in Persian: بانک رفاه, Bank Refah), is one of Iran's major banks. Bank Refah, with its headquarters in Tehran, Iran, is a retail commercial bank owned and controlled by Social Security Organization of Iran. Refah Bank provides a range of products and services.

== History ==
=== The workers' bank ===
Refah is very nice Insurance premiums, payment of salaries and pensions, mortgages and personal loans. Bank Refah was categorized as a non-commercial bank until it was nationalized in 1979 less than a year after the Islamic Revolution. With the Nationalization law passed by the Islamic Majlis of Iran, the bank's ownership was transferred to the government. It was also recategorized as a commercial bank.

=== Ownership ===
In accordance with article 39 of Iran's 1959 fiscal budget, Refah Bank's initial capital was 400,000,000 Iranian Rials (just over US$5.7 million) fully funded by the Iranian Social Security Organization. Although the bank was nationalized in 1979, its management was returned to the Social Welfare Organization (now known as the Ministry of Welfare and Social Affairs) in 1993. In March 2001, the bank's capital was raised to Rls 1,961 billion (approximately US$250M) of which close to 94 percent was paid by the Iranian Social Security Organization. The bank currently owns a subsidiary in Belarus, known as Onerbank

=== Sanctions ===
On 6 September 2013, the European General Court in Luxembourg ruled to annul the European Union sanctions in place since 2010 against the bank on grounds of supporting the Iranian nuclear and missile programs, as the EU had failed to explain the reasons for the sanctions. As of 2016, the EU asset freeze was still in effect.

== Islamic banking ==
All banks in Iran must follow the banking principles and practices described in the Islamic banking law of Iran passed in 1983 by the Islamic Majlis of Iran. According to this law, banks can only engage in interest-free Islamic transactions (interest is considered usury or riba and is forbidden by Islam and the holy book of Quran). These are commercial transactions that involve exchange of goods and services in return for a share of the assumed "profit". All such transactions are performed through Islamic contracts, such as Mozarebe, Foroush Aghsati, Joale, Salaf, and Gharzol-hassane.

In July 2007 the bank launched a new banking service named "Gold Coins Deposit Account". Through this new service, Bank Refah's customers can deposit their gold coins into a special deposit account and in return receive points, which they can then redeem against future loans and credits. The launch of this unique deposit account, which received high publicity in the Iranian media, was marked by a presidential speech by the Iranian president Mahmoud Ahmadinejad.

The bank's CEO Peyman Nouri announced in March 2007 that his bank has been authorised by the Central Bank of Iran to issue international credit cards.

== Financial numbers ==
As of March, 2023 ($1 USD is approximately 450,000 [Iranian Rial](Rls) ):

- Total assets = $11.3 Billion ▲
- Capitalization = $1.4 Billion ▲
- Total income = $412 Million ▲
- Total loans = $2.7 Billion
- Total deposits (short and long term) = $2.6 Billion
- Number of branches = 1012
- Number of employees = 10774

== Current CEO and directors ==
- Dr. Esmaeel Lalegani, CEO
- Vahid Khanlari
- Nejat Amini
- Mostafa Sargolzaei
- Hamidreza Fathi Beiranvand

== Payment Received controversial CEO ==
In June 2016, the CEO of the bank's earnings news release (Ali Sidqi) by a news site about the rights and benefits of administrators led to frequent controversy and debate.

== Information technology ==
Bank Refah established its first Data Processing department in early 1970s. The Data Processing department was equipped with a small IBM 370 Mainframe computer, which was mainly used for batch processing of deposit and mortgage accounts. The bank's IT department was later dissolved in 1976 and its staff were moved to the IT division of the Iranian Social Security Organization (ISSO).

After the Iranian Revolution in 1978, the agreement with ISSO (and EDS) was terminated. Bank Refah stopped using ISSO data center and reverted to manual processing. All business units and bank branches were instructed to set up paper-based customer and account ledgers.

A few years later in 1988, then CEO of the bank purchased the first Personal Computer for the bank. However, despite the efforts, its IT infrastructure and systems are well behind modern western and regional banks. Lack of skilled IT resources, unavailability of high speed data lines, insufficient investment, poor IT leadership and foreign sanctions have contributed to the slow progress of data processing in the Iranian banks and Bank Refah hasn't been an exception.

In the spring of 2007, Bank Refah opened its first unmanned branch in Tehran with two ATM's and four information kiosks.

== See also ==
- Banking and Insurance in Iran
- Central Bank of Iran
- Privatization in Iran
- Islamic banking
