= Bank Sepah =

Iranian banking and financial services corporation

Bank Sepah بانک سپه

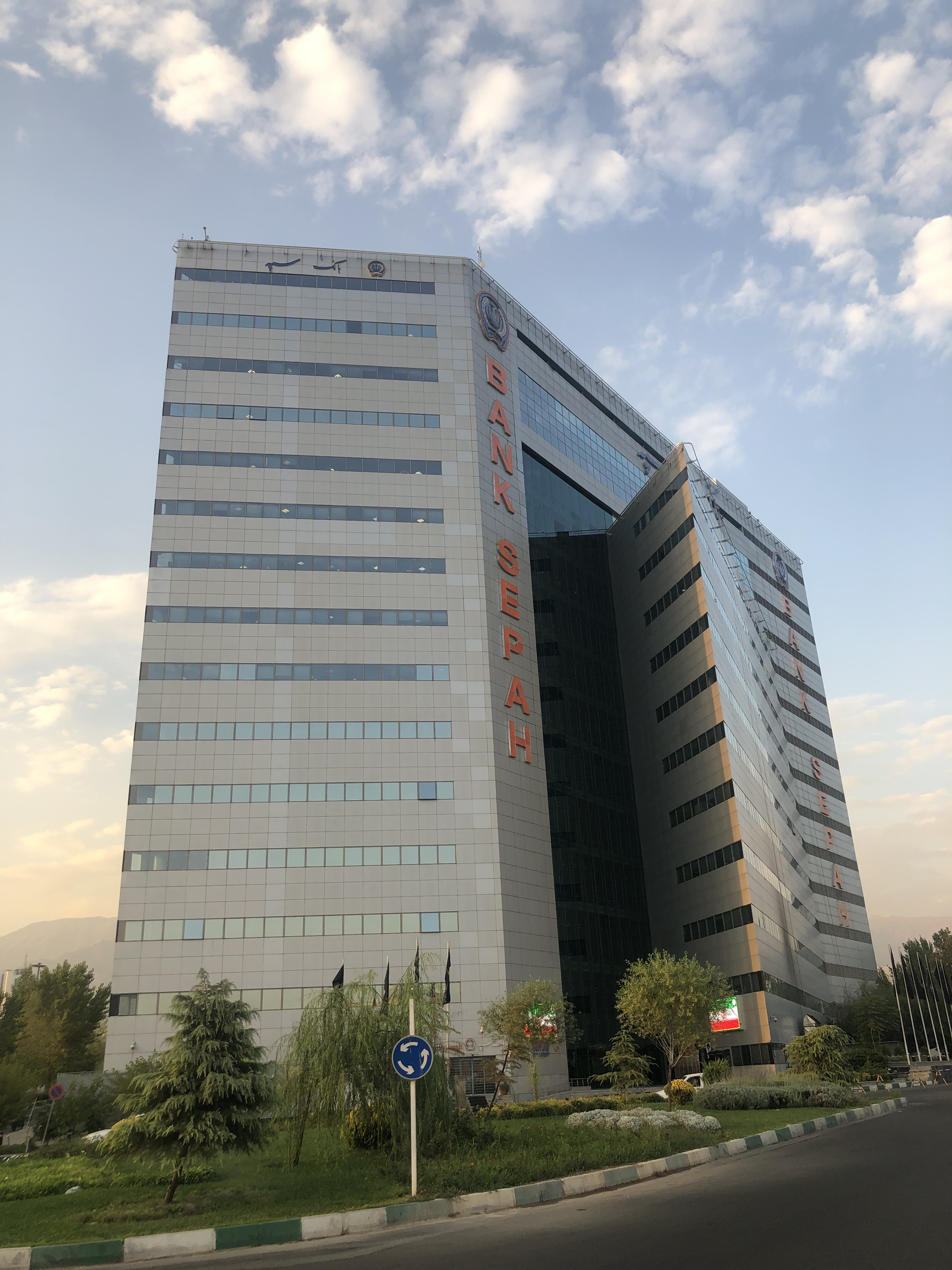
- Bank Sepah headquarters in Tehran
- Type: Government-owned corporation
- Industry: Banking, Financial services
- Founded: 1925; 101 years ago
- Founder: Iranian Army Pension Fund
- Headquarters: Negin Sepah Building, Argentina Square, Tehran, Iran
- Area served: Worldwide
- Key people: Ayatollah Ebrahimi (CEO)
- Services: Credit cards, consumer banking, corporate banking, mortgage loans
- Revenue: ▲37,153,487 IRR (2014)*
- Operating income: ▲20,701,827 IRR (2014)*
- Net income: ▲490,892 IRR (2014)*
- Total assets: ▲500,319,226 IRR (2014)*
- Total equity: ▲72,427,585 IRR (2014)*
- Number of employees: 18,277
- Subsidiaries: Bank Sepah International plc
- Website: sphbank.ir
- Footnotes * Amounts in IRR million

Bank Sepah (Persian: بانک سپه, Bānke Sepah, lit. 'Bank of the Army') is a major bank in Iran with historical links with the country's military community, headquartered in Tehran. It was established in 1925 as the first modern domestic Iranian bank, as opposed to the foreign-owned Imperial Bank of Persia. Owned by the Iranian government, it has been referred to as a financial platform for the country's Ministry of Defence and Armed Forces Logistics.

== History ==
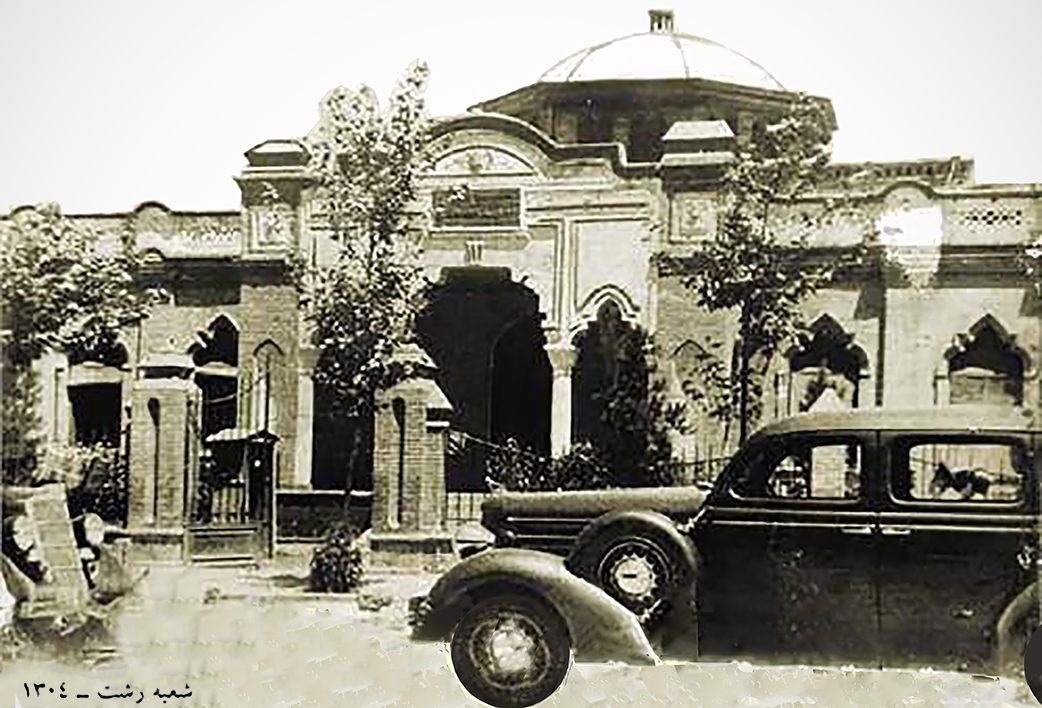
Bank Sepah branch in Rasht, in the 1920s

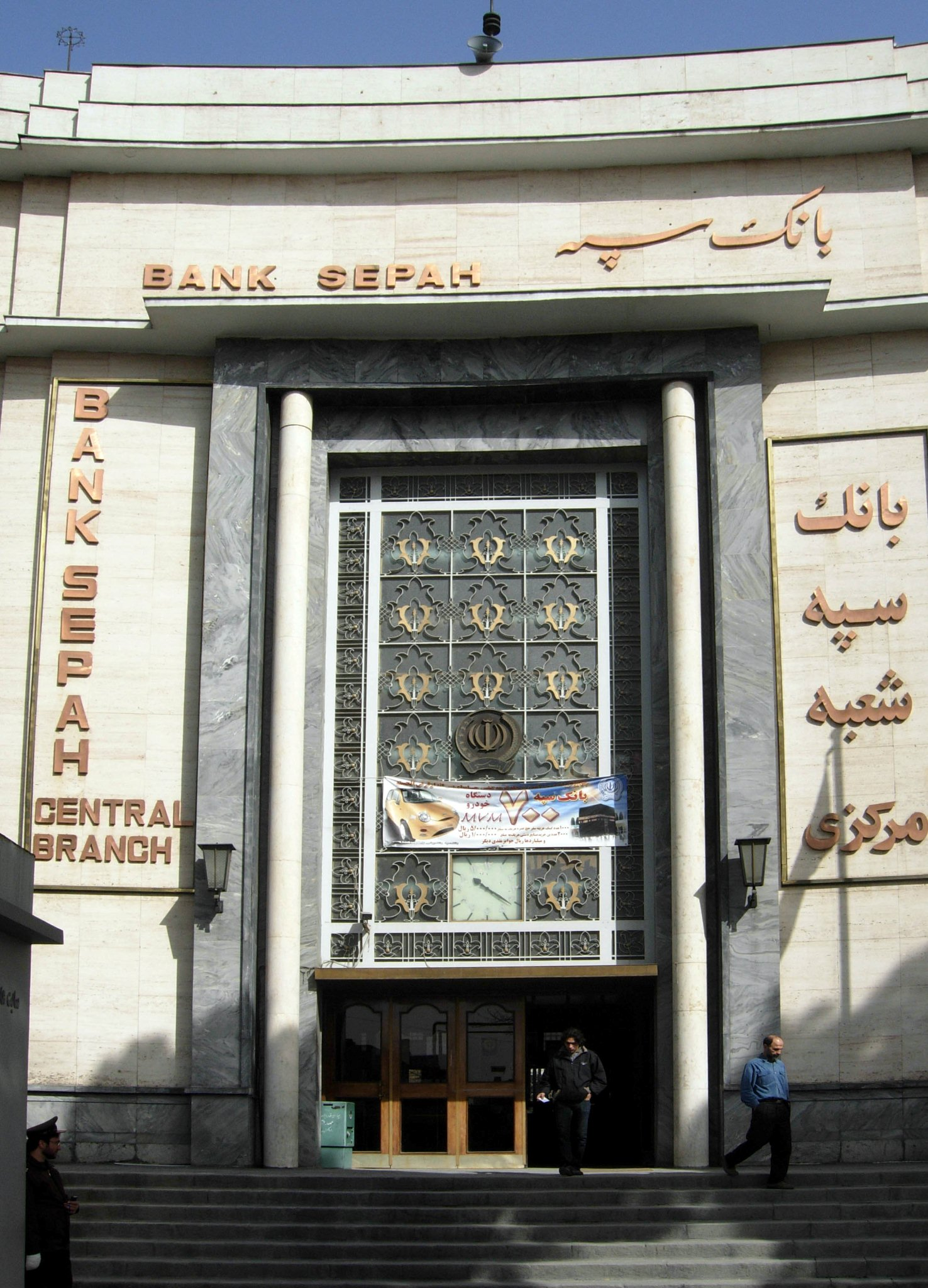
Former central branch of Bank Sepah in Tehran, lately Bank Sepah Museum

Bank Sepah was founded on 4 May 1925, initially known as Bank Pahlavi Qoshun (lit. 'Pahlavi Army Bank') in Tehran, with a capital of 388,395 tomans (3.88 million rials). It was intended to handle the financial affairs of the military personnel and set up their retirement fund. With further increase in their domain of services, the headquarters for the bank was moved to a larger building in Homayoon Street. Starting on 15 March 1926, with opening of another branch in Rasht, Bank Sepah began providing services not only to the military personnel but to the more general public such as businessmen. Also in 1926, it changed its name to Bank Sepah.

Bank Sepah opened a branch in London in 1972, which in 2002 was reorganized as a fully owned subsidiary named Bank Sepah International Plc (BSIP). It also has branches in Frankfurt, Paris and Rome.

In the early 2020s, Sepah Bank absorbed four other Iranian banks and one credit institution: Ansar Bank, Mehr Eqtesad Bank, Hekmat Iranian Bank, Ghavamin Bank and the Kosar Credit Institution. The Omid Bank app is product of Bank Sepah.

Bank Sepah maintains a museum in its former central branch in downtown Tehran, built 1950-1953 on a design by Vartan Hovanessian, immediately west of Imam Khomeini Square in Tehran. The museum maintains a collection of money artefacts since ancient times.

== US and UN sanctions ==
Sanctions were imposed on Bank Sepah by the United States on 9 January 2007, due to Iran's suspected nuclear weapons program. The United States claimed that the bank assisted Iran in developing missiles that could carry nuclear weapons. and all its branches and subsidiaries in Italy, UK, France and Germany will have their assets frozen by the United States in order to prevent Iran from constructing nuclear weapons. The official website of Bank Sepah in Iran reacted by mentioning the American resolution "fabricated statements based on purely hypothetical pretext, made out of political inducements" and promised that the bank will "continue with its efficient performance with due observance of internal and international regulations as before."

On the same basis, further sanctions have also been imposed by the United Nations through Resolution 1747 of 29 March 2007 coinciding with the arrest by the Iranian Government of some British army personnel in the Persian Gulf. In early 2016, following the talks of P5+1 with Iran on the Nuclear program of Iran, and the resultant Joint Comprehensive Plan of Action, sanctions against Bank Sepah were lifted.

== Iran war air strike ==
During the 2026 Iran war, the bank was airstriked on March 12. The bank was also hacked alongside National Iranian regime Bank Melli.

== Cyberattacks ==
Two separate cyberattacks affected the bank in 2025.

=== Breach disclosed in March 2025 ===
In early March 2025, the hacker group Codebreakers posted a message on Telegram and other social platforms claiming they had infiltrated Bank Sepah's systems and extracted vast amounts of data. They alleged access to more than 12 terabytes of confidential data belonging to more than 42 million individuals, including account numbers, passwords, mobile phone numbers, residential addresses, bank transaction histories, and information related to military personnel. The group stated that they had offered the bank a 72-hour window for negotiations to prevent the disclosure of the information, with the demand of $42 million in Bitcoin, which the bank refused to pay.

Initially Sepah Bank denied all claims that its security systems had been breached, as head of the Bank’s Public Relations Department Reza Hamedanchi stated that the bank's systems worked on closed networks with no connection to the internet, and that "Sepah Bank’s systems are unhackable and impenetrable”. However, the bank warned media and citizens against republishing the information obtained by the hackers and threatened with legal action against those who did. The threats were issued due to the bank's "position with the armed forces" and the importance of "confidentiality of information related to the country's military and security institutions".

In response to the bank's denial and its "indifference to the security breach", the Codebreakers group released images of the banking data belonging to head of public relations at Bank Sepah, Reza Hamedanchi, as well as the private banking data of 20 thousand individuals, including high-profile civilian and military customers. Among those whose private information and account details were exposed are Abbas Golmohammadi, former deputy director of exploration at the Geological and Mineral Exploration Organization of the country and deputy director of planning and development of the Sangan Iron Ore Complex, with an account of 768 billion Tomans, General Hassan Palarak, former senior commander of the Revolutionary Guards Quds force, a supporter of pro-Islamic Republic militias in the region and a close associate of Qassem Soleimani, with a value of 634 billion tomans ($6.12M at the open market rate), Alireza Arash, a member of the board of directors of Henkel Pakwash, a subsidiary of the German multinational chemical company Henkel, with an account of 408 billion Tomans. Other notable individuals whose details were exposed are Mohammad Baradaran, a board member of Ghadir Investment Company, Kazem Ghalamchi, founder of Ghalamchi Educational Institute and Rasoul Sirati, CEO of Tik, a military affiliate company reportedly involved in missile and drone technology.

The leaked information and the bank's response to the attack triggered a wave of criticism online, with Iranian citizens raising questions on how such large sums of money can be held by only a few individuals, while the general public struggles with financial difficulties. Ali Sharifizarchi, an academic with a large following on X, focussed particularly on Palarak, questioning how his wealth is justified in light of the widespread economic crisis. Investigative journalist Yashar Soltani stated that the exposed data explains why Iranian citizens support the sanctions against Iran and demand financial transparency. Conservative journalist Ali Gholhaki, as well as other users of social media, have mocked the bank for threatening legal action while simultaneously denying there had been any data breach.

=== June 2025 cyberattack ===
On 17 June 2025, widespread disruptions were reported in Bank Sepah services. The disruptions affected online banking, ATMs, and other digital services, leaving many customers unable to carry out daily banking operations. Pro-Israel hacking group Predatory Sparrow claimed responsibility for the attack and accused the bank of helping to fund Iran's military.

According to Iranian media, the disruptions also impacted fuel stations, which rely on Bank Sepah’s banking infrastructure. This situation raised concerns about a broader crisis in public service delivery.

Later that day, a video was circulated showing the interior of the bank’s data center, where unidentified individuals were seen interacting physically with the servers, with no official explanation provided regarding their identity or mission. The footage sparked a wave of speculation across Iranian social media, with some users suggesting that the disruption may have resulted from physical intrusion into the data center, rather than a purely technical malfunction.

== See also ==
- Banking and insurance in Iran
