= Iran-Venezuela Bi-National Bank =

International financial institution

Iran Venezuela Bi-National Bank
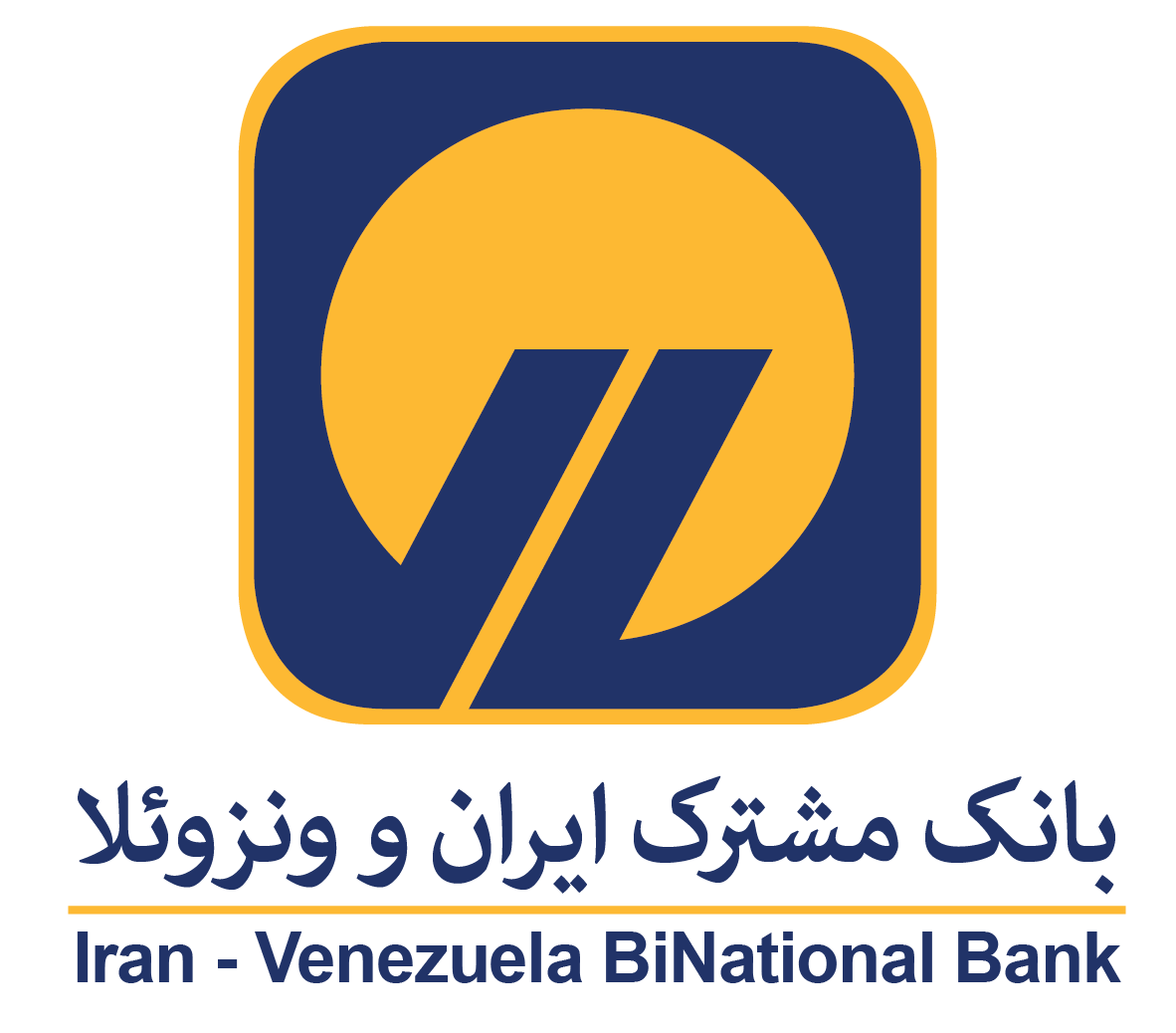
- Company type: JV
- Industry: Financial services
- Founded: 2010; 15 years ago
- Founders: Mahmoud Ahmadinejad and Hugo Chávez
- Headquarters: Tehran, Iran
- Number of locations: 1
- Key people: Mohammad Ghazaei Pakdehi (CEO)
- Revenue: ▼ Rls.623,269,892,975 (2016–17); Rls.715,955,207,800 (2015–16)
- Net income: ▼ Rls.363,021,917,597 (2016–17); Rls.380,171,634,554 (2015–16)
- Total assets: ▼ Rls.7,135,105,938,521 (2016–17); Rls.32,365,508,413,721 (2015–16)
- Owner: Banco Industrial de Venezuela (50%); Export Development Bank of Iran (50%)
- Number of employees: ▼79 (2016–17); 82 (2015–16)
- Website: ivbb.ir
- Footnotes / references Annual Report Fiscal Year (2016–2017)

Iran-Venezuela Bi-National Bank (Persian: بانک مشترک ایران و ونزوئلا, Bank Moshtarek-e Iran vâ Vânuzuilâ, Spanish: Banco Binacional Irán-Venezuela) is an international financial institution that was founded in 2010 with an aim to develop commercial ties between Iran and Venezuela.

Out of the 40 banks legally licensed to operate in Iran, the Iran-Venezuela Bi-National Bank is one of the only five foreign banks to make that list. In 2024 the bank was targeted in a cyberattack by IRLeaks.

== History ==
It started as a joint venture between two state-owned banks, Banco Industrial de Venezuela and Export Development Bank of Iran with a starting capital of $200 million offered equally by both parties.

In September 2013, the United States Department of the Treasury imposed sanction on the bank. In 2015, an official in the Central Bank of the Islamic Republic of Iran told press that "[the] bank is not given much freedom" and it is being managed one-sidedly by Iran, because the Venezuelan side does not participate in the general assemblies. By 2016, the Iranian side was willing to sell its share. In 2018, the US reimposed sanctions on the bank.

In July 2020, Iran officials announced the Iran-Venezuela Bi-National Bank would enter the Tehran Stock Exchange by March 2021 (17% to be floated on the stock market).

In 2024, the Iran-Venezuela Bi-National Bank was attacked in a cyberattack by IRLeaks, which affected 20 Iranian banks, including the Central Bank of Iran. Politico referred to it as the "worst attack" in Iran's history.
