= Islamic Republic Development Bank =

The Islamic Republic Development Bank is an Iranian government bank that is to be managed by the Central Bank of Iran. The plan to create the development bank was laid out in 2023, and the bank is scheduled to be opened by 2024.

== Background ==
The purpose of the bank is to help jobs, industry, and infrastructure in smaller towns and cities. It is to surpass the other specialized government bank, the military funding bank. The bank would procure and sell development stocks. It is part of the seventh quininal program. Ensafnews called it 'a daydream for the government.'

Five banks merged to create this bank:

- Bank Keshavarzi or Agriculture
- Bank Industry and Mining
- Bank Export Development
- Bank Cooperative Development
- Bank Maskan or Housing

It was part of the central banking reform program launched by Ebrahim Raisi.
