= Monetary and Banking Research Institute =

Iranian research institute

- پژوهشکده پولی و بانکی
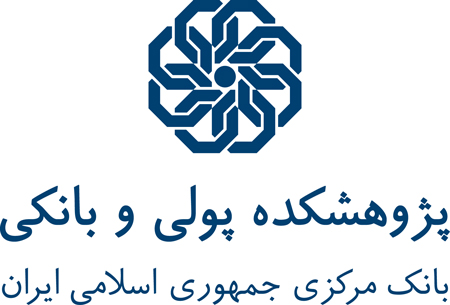
- Latin: Pezhuheshkâdh-e Puli-ye Banki
- Established: 1990
- Field of research: Macroeconomics, Financial Economics
- President: Kourosh Parvizian
- Vice president: Mahdi Hadian
- Location: Tehran, Tehran Province, Iran
- Affiliations: Central Bank of Iran
- Website: www.mbri.ac.ir

The Monetary and Banking Research Institute (MBRI) (formerly known as Monetary and Banking Research Academy (MBRA)) is the research arm of the Central Bank of Iran.

== Historical background ==
The Monetary and Banking Research Institute (MBRI) was established in 1990 out of necessity for a central repository of the monetary and banking research in the country.

== Duties ==
The most important goals and duties of the MBRI are as follows:

1. Performing economic researches for individuals and organizations, domestically and internationally.
2. Compiling economic data of Iran and other countries.
3. Cooperation with national and international universities and research institutions through workshops, seminars and conferences.

== Organization ==
MBRI's organization consists of:

1. Board of Trustees (the Central Bank of Islamic Republic of Iran's Governor as the President),
2. advisers, vice presidents, research groups, faculty members,
3. finance department, service group, publications, data bank, international affairs and conferences department, library and computer center.

== See also ==
- Central Bank of Iran
- Banking and insurance in Iran
- Economy of Iran
- Iran Banking Institute
