= Bank Melli Iran =

Iranian banking and financial services corporation

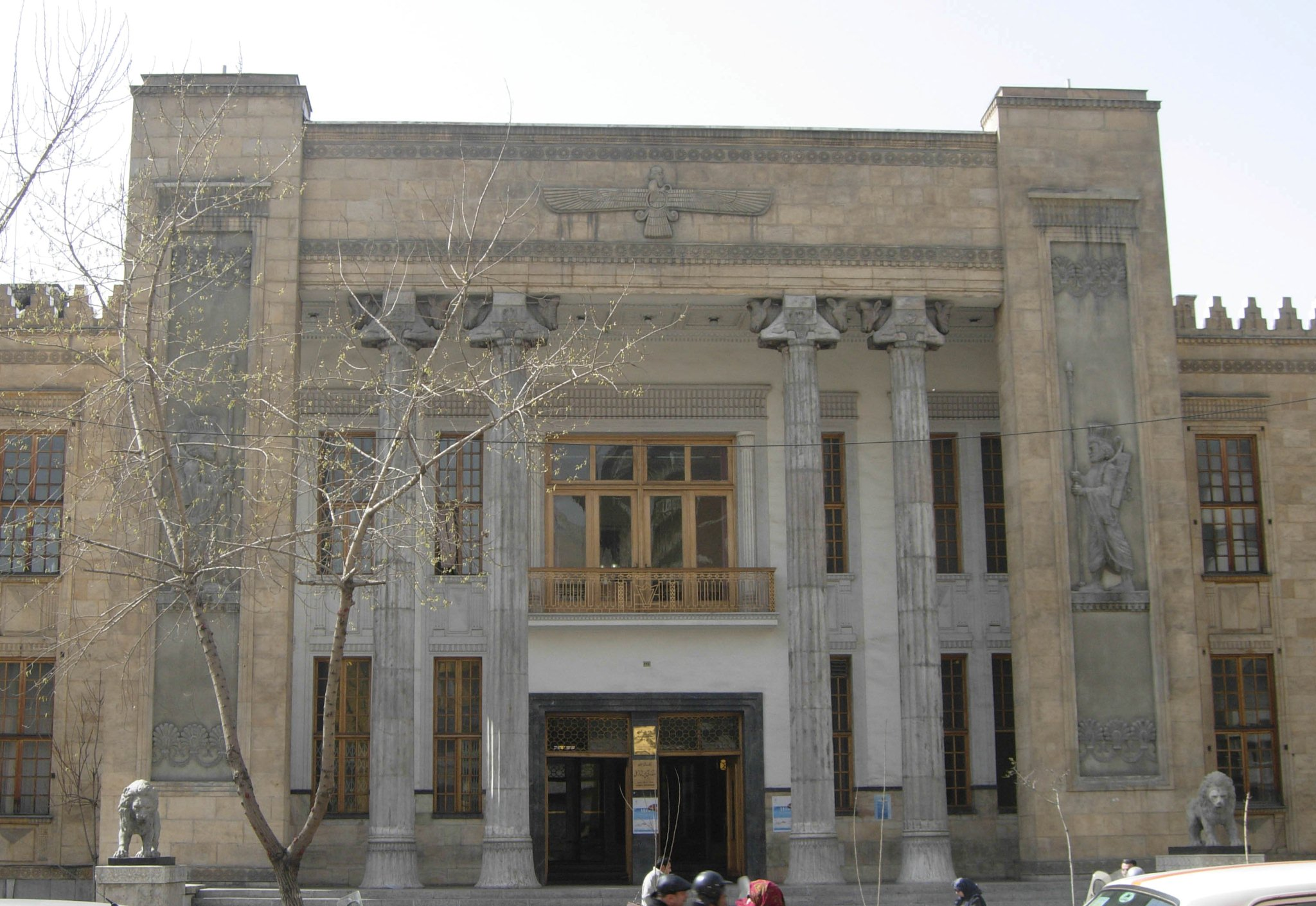
- Historic head office building of Bank Melli Iran on Ferdowsi Street, Tehran
- Type: State-owned enterprise
- Industry: Banking, financial services
- Founded: 8 September 1928; 98 years ago
- Headquarters: Ferdowsi Street, Tehran, Iran
- Area served: Worldwide
- Key people: Mohsen Seyfi Kafshgari (CEO)
- Products: Consumer banking, corporate banking, finance and insurance, investment banking, mortgage loans, wealth management, credit cards,
- Revenue: US$10.510 billion (2015)
- Number of employees: 39,305
- Website: bmi.ir/en/

Bank Melli Iran (BMI; Persian: بانک ملّی ایران, romanized: Bānk-e Melli-ye Irān, lit. 'National Bank of Iran') is a leading commercial bank in Iran, headquartered in Tehran. It was established in 1928 under the newly established rule of Reza Shah, and served as the country's central bank until 1960, when the Central Bank of Iran was established for that purpose and Bank Melli Iran was repurposed as a merely commercial bank.

As of 2016, Bank Melli Iran was the largest Iranian company in terms of annual income with a revenue of 364 657 billion rials in 2016. It was the largest bank in the Islamic world and in the Middle East. By the end of 2016, BMI had net assets of $76.6 billion and a network of 3.328 banking branches; so it was known as the largest Iranian bank based on the amount of assets. The brand of BMI was recognized as one of the 100 top Iranian brands in 10th National Iranian Heroes Championship in 2013. The National Bank has 3328 active branches inside, 14 active branches and 4 sub-stations abroad, and it has 180 booths.

== History ==
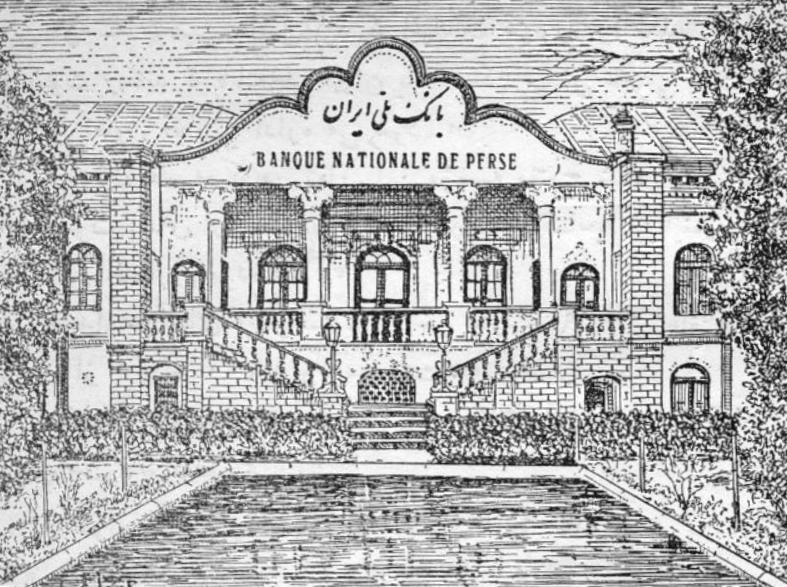
Bank Melli Iran in 1928, with its names indicated in Persian and French on the former building of the Tobacco Régie in Tehran

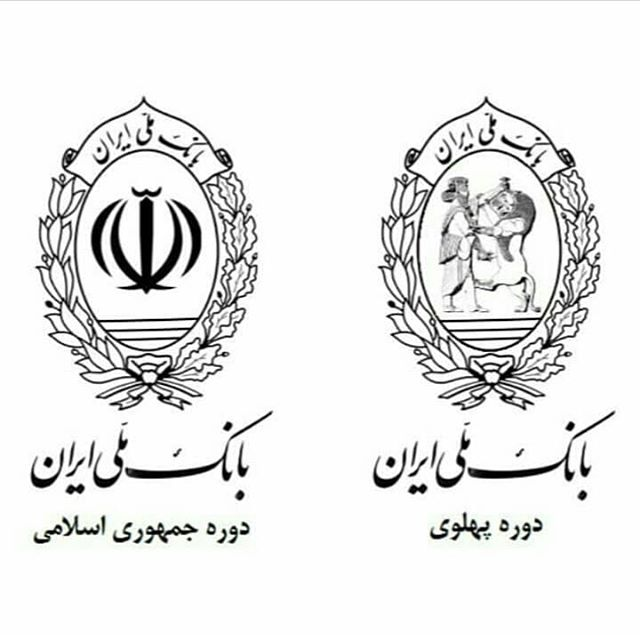
Logo of Bank Melli Iran before (right) and after (left) the Islamic Revolution of 1979. Before the Revolution, the logo depicted the Battle of Shahriar and Lion; afterwards, it showed the emblem of Iran.

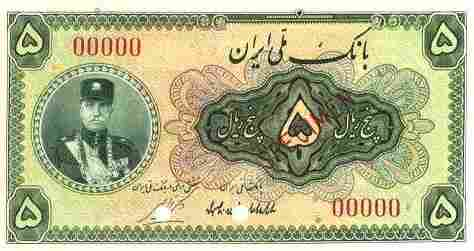
First series of 5 Rials banknote of Reza Shah era

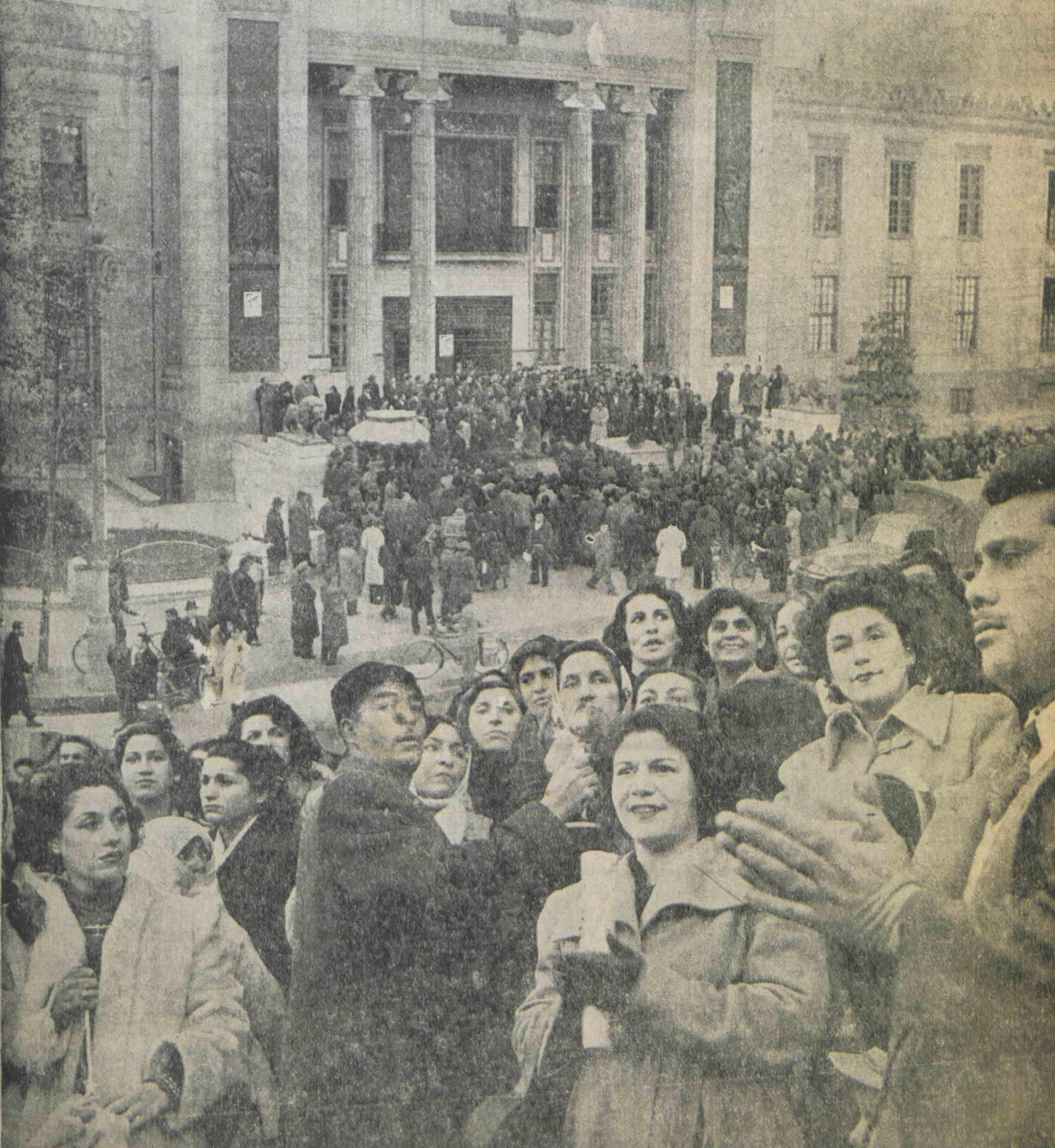
Women demonstrating in front of the BMI building, 1952

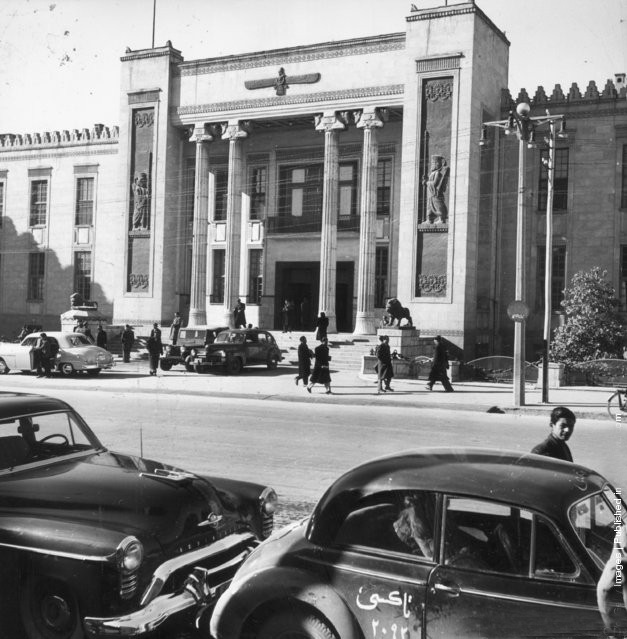
Head office building photographed in the 1960s

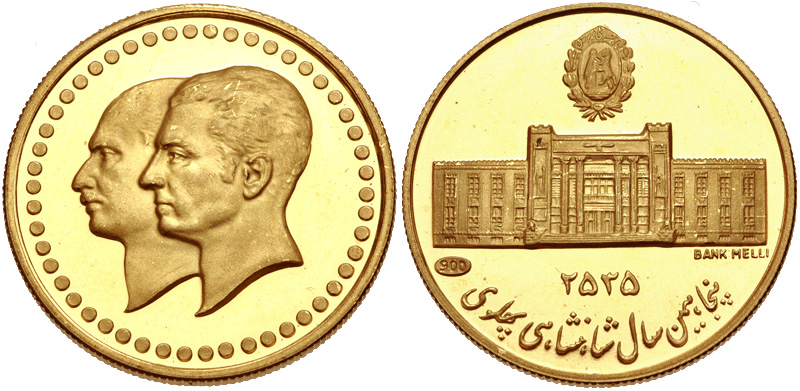
Commemorative gold medal issued in 1976/7 by the Bank Melli on the occasion of the Golden jubilee of the Pahlavi dynasty

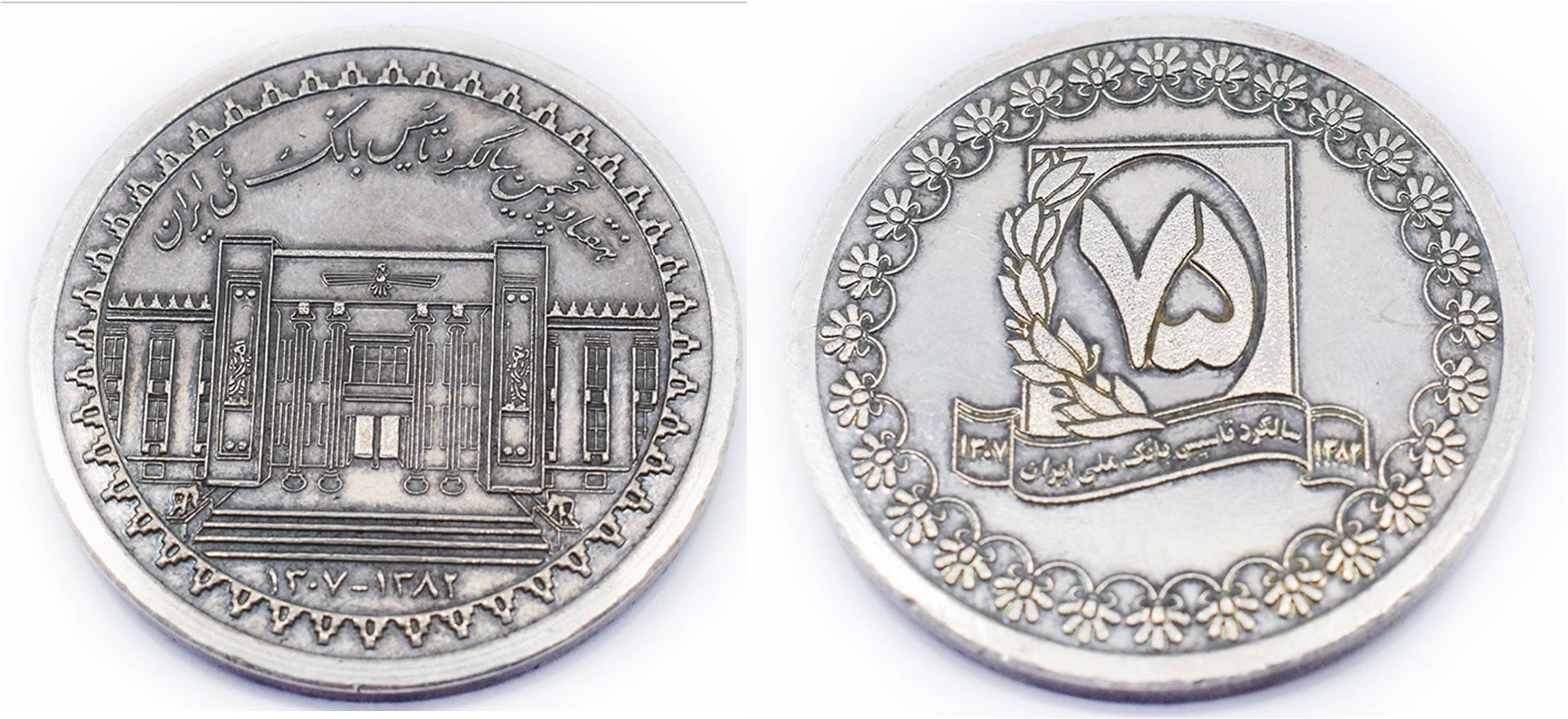
Silver commemorative coin of the 75th anniversary of Bank Melli's establishment, 2003

=== Background ===
The formation of a modern national bank that would keep foreign influence in check became a topic of debate in Qajar Iran during the last quarter of the 19th century, following similar debates in the Ottoman Empire following the establishment of the foreign-controlled Ottoman Imperial Bank in 1863. In 1879, a proposal along such lines was made to emperor Naser al-Din Shah by Tehran business leader Haj Muhammad Hassan Amin al-Zarb. During the Persian Constitutional Revolution, the aspiration to financial independence became a major political issue, leading to the publication of a manifesto promoted by a group of prominent merchants in December 1906.

On 23 November 1906, Abolqasem Naser ol-Molk, the Minister of Finance of the time of Mozaffar ad-Din Shah Qajar, reported to the National Consultative Assembly about the country's financial crisis and suggested a loan from European countries to deal with it, but the deputies rejected that option and, on 9 December, agreed to establish a national bank instead. But the abrupt changes in the political environment and the Anglo-Russian Convention of August 1907 prevented that vision from becoming reality until after the 1921 Persian coup d'état and the establishment of the Pahlavi dynasty in 1925. Soon after cementing his rule, Reza Shah started considering a revival of the national bank project, intended as a departure from Persia's previous dependency on foreign finance embodied by the Imperial Bank of Persia.

=== National bank of issue ===
The bank was initially established as Banque Nationale de Perse (lit. 'National Bank of Persia') in 1928, based on a law approved by the National Consultative Assembly on 14 May 1927. The bank's statute was approved by the National Consultative Assembly's Finance Committee on 14 July 1928. The bank started operations on 8 September 1928, originally located in the former building of the Persian Tobacco Régie. Its initial capital was 20 million Rials, of which 8 million were paid. It soon opened two branches in addition to its head office, in Tehran's Grand Bazaar and in Bushehr, the country's most important commercial port.

Due to the fact that there were no bank specialists in Iran at that time, the law allowed the recruitment of Swiss or German nationals for the administration of the bank. The first CEO of the National Bank, Kurt Lindenblatt, and its vice-president, Otto Vogel, came to Iran together with other experts from Germany. The number of bank employees on the opening day, including Iranian and German, did not exceed 27.

On 22 March 1931, the National Consultative Assembly granted Bank Melli Iran a monopoly on banknote issuance for 10 years, automatically renewable for another ten years if not formally canceled in the meantime. The BMI's first banknotes were originally intended to be introduced on 20 June 1931, but due to delays in issuance, they were eventually issued on 21 March 1932, the day of Nowruz; they coexisted for several months with those of the Imperial Bank of Persia, which were officially withdrawn in September 1932. Also in 1932, the bank's long-term credit operations were spun off as the Iranian Agricultural and Industrial Bank (French: Banque Agricole et Industrielle de l'Iran), later known as Bank Keshavarzi Iran.

In 1936, Bank Melli Iran moved into a purpose-built modern head office on Ferdowsi Street, designed by German architect H. Heinrich, whose construction had started in 1933.

In 1938, the bank's mortgage credit operations were similarly spun off as the Mortgage Bank of Iran, or Bank Rahni Iran. In 1939, the saving fund of Bank Melli Iran was established under a law to encourage people to save money.

In the early 1940s, Bank Melli Iran open several regional branches that shared the same monumentalist style, all designed by architect Mohsen Foroughi, in Tabriz (1940), the Tehran Basaar (1941), Isfahan (1941), and Shiraz.

In 1942, the bank was renamed National Bank of Iran in line with the new name of the country.

=== Commercial bank ===
In 1960, the creation of the Central Bank of Iran put an end to the role of Bank Melli Iran as a bank of issue. Bank Melli Iran went on as a commercial bank.

In 1965, it opened its first international branch in Hamburg. In 1967, it opened branches in London, which in 2002 were reorganized as a fully owned subsidiary named Melli Bank plc.

=== Since the Islamic Revolution ===
After the Islamic Revolution, changes to the banking system were implemented in order to conform with Sharia law in the realm of Islamic banking and finance. The new law was passed in 1984. There are more than 3328 active branches inside, 14 active branches and 4 subsidiaries abroad and 180 offices.

In 2002, BMI established a Russian subsidiary, Mir Business Bank in Moscow. In 2004, it partnered with Bank Saderat Iran to establish Arian Bank in Kabul. In 2006, it also established a branch in Hong Kong.

== Operations ==
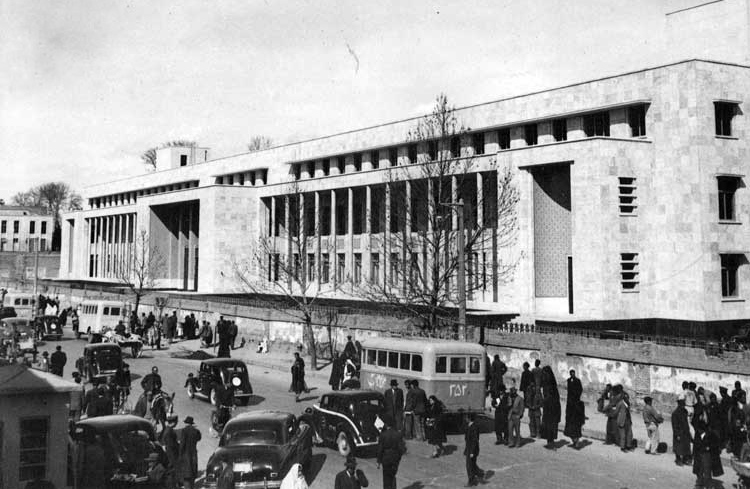
Tehran Bazaar branch building, photographed in the mid-20th century

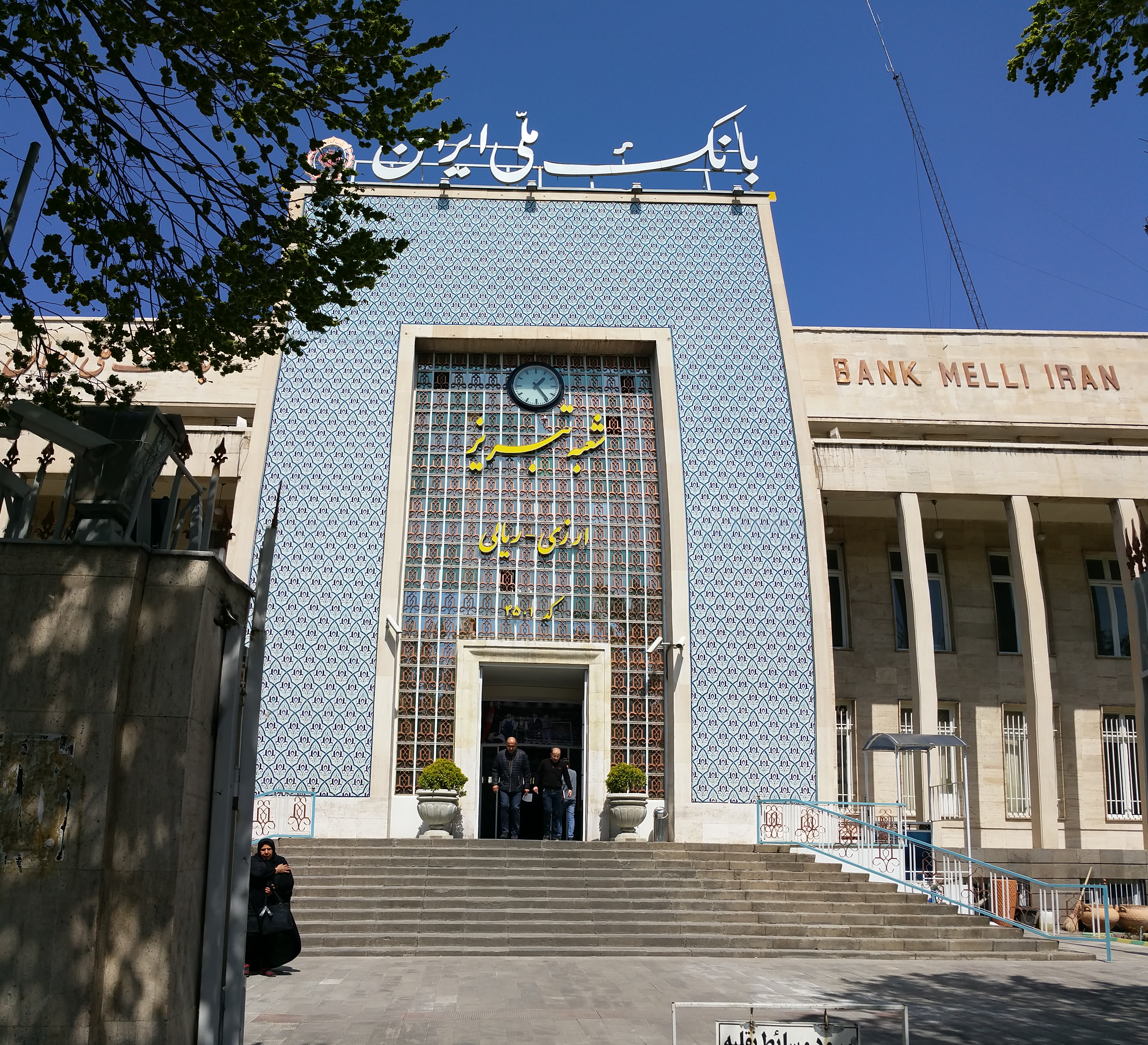
Bank Melli Iran Building in Tabriz

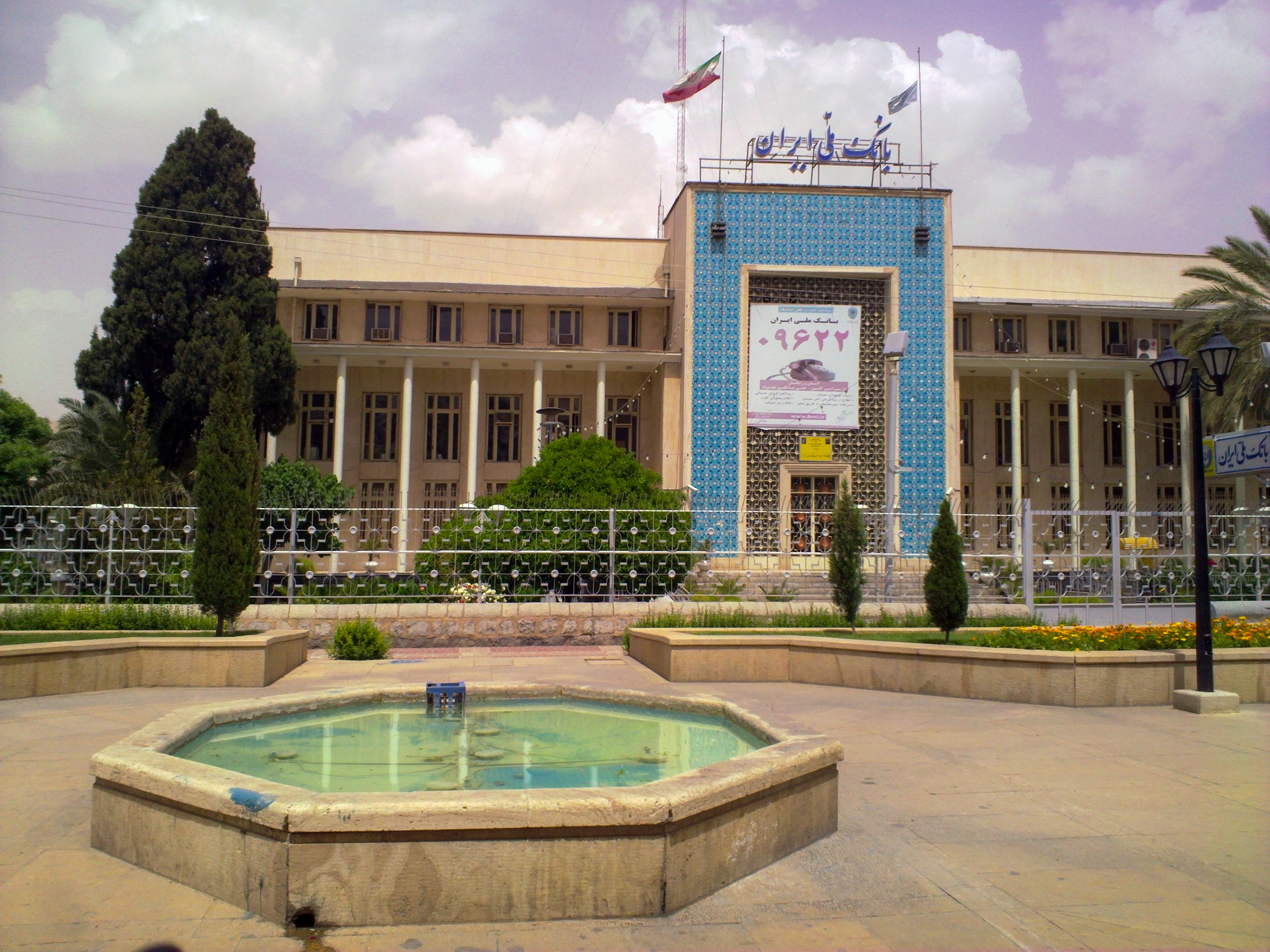
Bank Melli Iran Building in Shiraz

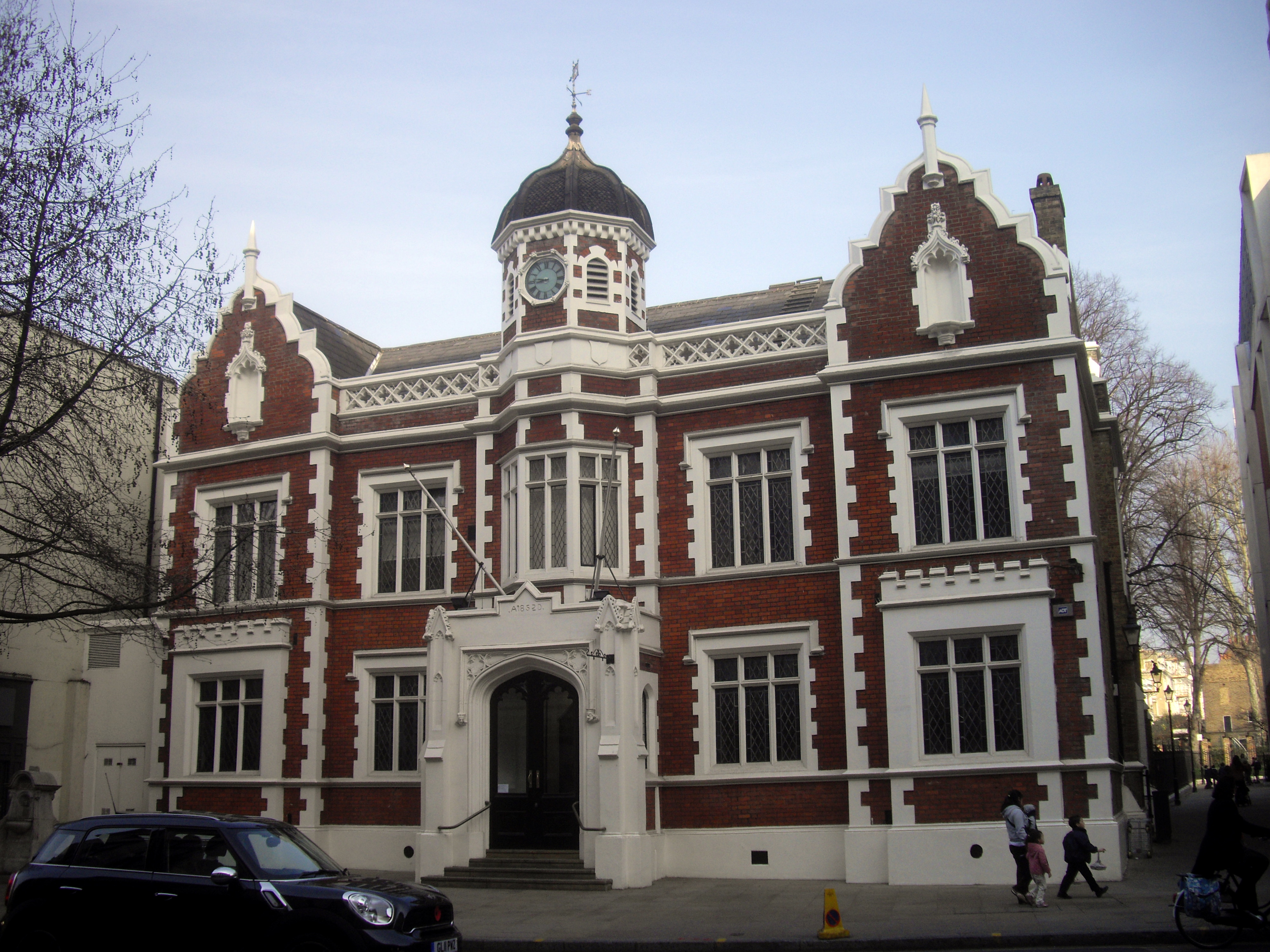
Kensington Vestry Hall, office of Bank Melli Iran in London

=== Staff ===
Serving condition table of BMI employees by gender:

| status | female | male | total |
|---|---|---|---|
| Employed | 3,263 | 36,042 | 39,305 |
| Employment status, 105 is disabled | 0 | 460 | 460 |
| Martyr (employed: 9, retired: 50) | 2 | 57 | 59 |
| retired prematurely | 616 | 3,402 | 4,018 |
| Other retirees | 1,618 | 14,505 | 16,123 |
| Dead (salaried: 7536) | 67 | 5,146 | 5,213 |
| total | 5,566 | 59,612 | 65,178 |

=== Subsidiaries ===
==== Sadad data company ====
In 1999, Sadad Data Company was registered at Companies Registration Office and Non-commercial Enterprises.

==== National Development Group ====
The National Development Group is an investment company, which is listed on the Tehran Stock Exchange.

=== Islamic banking ===
All banks in Iran must follow the banking principles and practices described in the Islamic Banking (Sharia) law of Iran passed in 1983 by the Islamic Majlis of Iran. According to this law, banks can only engage in interest-free Islamic transactions (interest is considered as usury or riba and is forbidden by Islam and its holy book the Quran). The permitted commercial transactions involve exchange of goods and services in return for a share of the assumed profit. All such transactions are performed through Islamic contracts, such as mozarebe, foroush aghsati, joale, salaf, and gharzol-hassane. Details of these contracts and related practices are contained in the Iranian Interest-Free banking law and its guidelines.

=== Social responsibilities ===
- Public Utilities Projects: At present, the bank has been involved in 39 public utilities project more than 114 billion Rials.
- Children Support.
- Support for cultural and scientific projects.
- Support for sports plans for releasing Diya prisoners .
- School building.

=== Financials ===
As of 16 June 2008 (US$1 is approximately 133,130 Iranian rial (Rls)):

- Total assets = Rls 360,517 billion
- Capitalization = Rls 36,487 billion
- Net income after tax = Rls 772 billion
- Total loans = Rls 163,595 billion
- Number of branches = 3,300
- Number of employees = 43,000
- Bank Melli Iran (BMI) has offered close to 30 percent of all credits to economic, production, industrial and services sectors.
- Online banking services offered by Bank Melli have registered a 370-percent growth in 2008.

Mohammad Reza Hosseinzadeh, director of BMI, announced that the Islamic Republic of Iran owes over 220,000 billion Rials to BMI. In 2009, the announcement of Mahmoud Reza Khavari's talks with ISNA news agency was published on the debt of 50 trillion Rials of Iranian government to the bank and the government's inability to repay the debt. But then, the news of "the government's inability to pay the debt" was denied by Khavari

== Offices and buildings ==
Bank Melli Iran has 18 international branches and services in 11 countries:

- Afghanistan (Kabul)
- Azerbaijan (Baku)
- Bahrain (Manama)
- France (Paris)
- Germany (Hamburg)
- Hong Kong (Hong Kong)
- Iraq (Baghdad & Basra)
- Oman (Muscat)
- Russia (Moscow)
- United Arab Emirates (Abu Dhabi – 4 branches, Dubai – 4 branches and Sharjah)
- United Kingdom (London)

== Controversies ==
=== Civil lawsuit ===
Following the September 1997 suicide bombing in Jerusalem, five American students who had been wounded were awarded $251 million in compensatory and punitive damages against the government of Iran and the Iranian Revolutionary Guard Corps by Judge Ricardo M. Urbina, under the Flatow Amendment of the Foreign Sovereign Immunities Act, in accordance with Section 201a of the Terrorism Risk Insurance Act of 2002, which states that "in every case in which a person has obtained a judgment against a terrorist party on a claim based upon an act of terrorism ... the blocked assets of that terrorist party ... shall be subject to execution". Since most Iranian assets in the United States had been withdrawn after the embassy hostage crisis, the only substantial monetary asset left was approximately $150,000 in the Bank Melli's account in the Bank of New York. Before turning over the funds to the five students, however, the Bank of New York sued for a legal decision regarding its responsibilities in the case. The United States Department of Justice, speaking as amicus curiae in support of Bank Melli, advised that the bank had no responsibility for turning the funds over to the students; in March 2006, Judge Denise Cole ruled against them, and was upheld by the Second Circuit Court in April 2007. Bank Melli then withdrew the funds from Bank of New York.

On 5 March 2018, Bank Melli lost an appeal "related to credit card use in Iran" concerning "roughly $17.6 million that Visa Inc and Franklin Resources Inc" were holding for Bank Melli.

=== United States sanctions ===
On 25 October 2007, the United States imposed unilateral sanctions against Iran. These sanctions include new measures to reduce Iran's ability to conduct financial transactions between the state-owned banks of Iran and United States citizens or private organisations. Bank Melli was included in these sanctions, on the grounds that, besides its other customers, Bank Melli provides financial services to Iran's nuclear and ballistic missile programmes. A fact sheet released by the US Treasury Department also asserts that between 2002 and 2006 Bank Melli sent at least $100 million to Hamas, Palestinian Islamic Jihad, Hezbollah and other groups, via the Quds Force, a branch of the Iranian Revolutionary Guard.

In a statement published on its website, BMI refuted the US allegations and denied that it has ever been involved in any "deceptive banking practices".

=== European Union sanctions ===
On 16 June 2008, the European Union imposed further unilateral sanctions against Iran. These sanctions include the European Union freezing the assets of Bank Melli, in response to Tehran's refusal to suspend its uranium enrichment program. After the lifting of sanctions, BMI was the first Iranian bank to be reconnected to Swift.

== Related entities ==
=== Publishing company ===
After assignment of right to publish banknotes to BMI, a limited organization was created to publish the date of issue on banknotes. This organization evolved along with development of BMI; it was known as "BMI Printing House". Printing company of BMI received the publication license from Ministry of Culture and Islamic Guidance in order to allow publication of book and magazine; so it renamed "BMI Printing and Publishing Company".

=== Hospital ===
The Hospital of BMI was established to provide health care and to meet the medical needs of its employees in 1938. Following this, the current building of the Bank Hospital was built in 1973.

=== Bank Melli Iran Museum ===
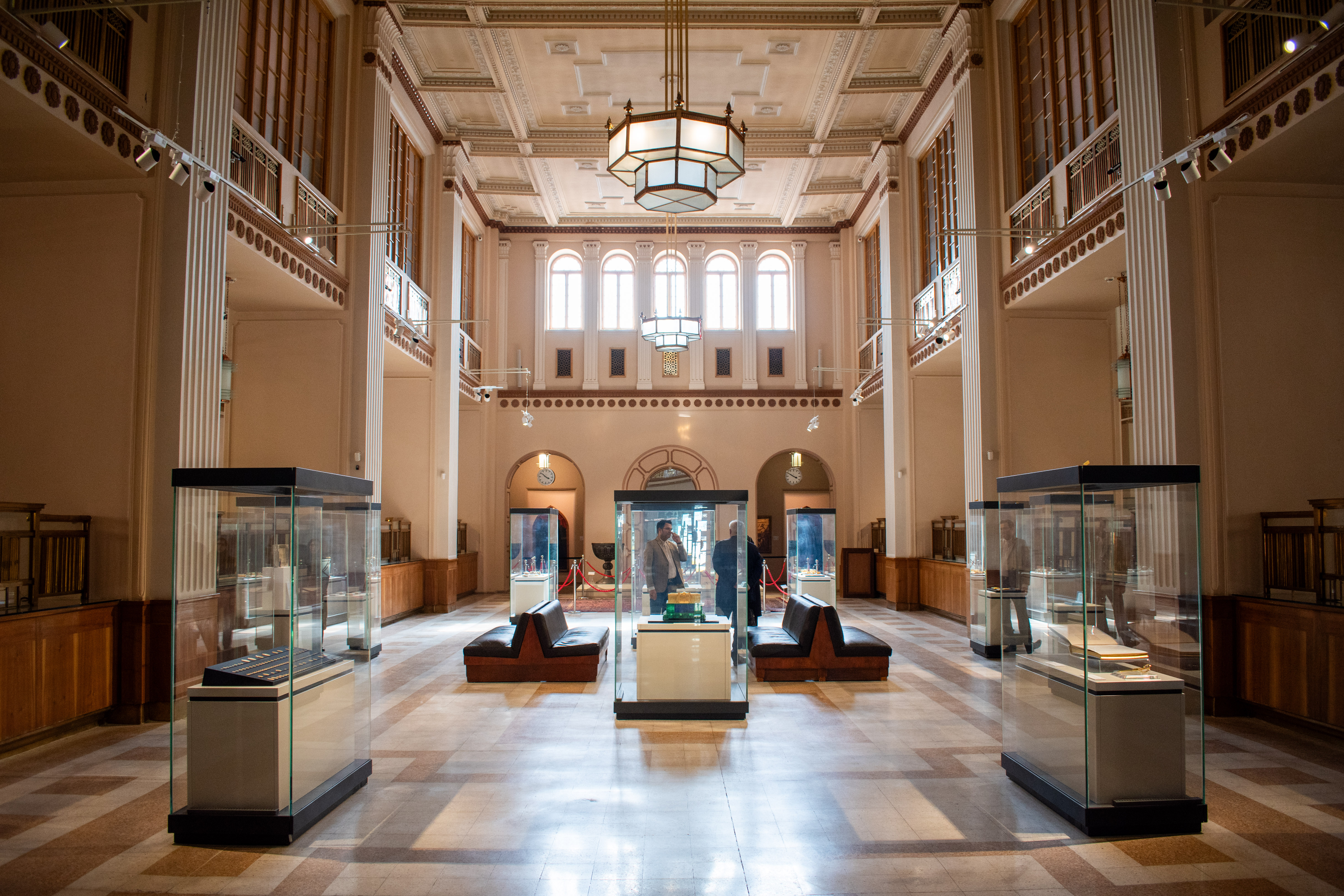
Interior of the museum, photographed in 2024

The Bank Melli Iran Museum is located in BMI's historic head office building on Ferdowsi Street in the center of Tehran. The building was registered in the category of national works of Iran on 20 December 2000, under registration number 2930.

The museum opened with the presence of first vice president Eshaq Jahangiri on 21 July 2017. Its collection includes ancient objects from the Achaemenid, Sasanian and later eras, including coins, paintings, rugs and blankets.

== Leadership ==
- Kurt Lindenblatt, September 1928 - September 1932
- Albert Schneider, September 1932 - April 1933
- Hossein Ala, April 1933 - March 1934
- Reza Gholi Amir Khosrovi, March 1934 - November 1939
- Mohamad Ali Farzin, November 1939 - October 1941
- Hossein Ala, October 1941 - December 1942
- Abul Hassan Ebtehaj, December 1942 - July 1950
- Ebrahim Zand, July 1950 - September 1951
- Ali Asghar Nasser, September 1951 - July 1952
- Mohammad Nassiri, July 1952 - August 1953
- Ali Asghar Nasser, September 1953 - April 1957
- Ebrahim Kashani, April 1957 - 1960
- Kazem Najafi Elmi, December 1986 - 1989

(Source:)

== See also ==
- Melli Bank, University of Tehran Branch
- Bank Markazi Iran
- Economy of Iran
- Islamic Banking
- Banking and insurance in Iran
- Companies of Pahlavi Iran

Bank of issue of Iran
| Preceded by Bank Shahi | Bank Melli Iran; 1929–1960 | Succeeded by Central Bank of Iran |
