= NDFI =

NDFI may refer to:

- National Development Fund of Iran
- Notre Dame Fighting Irish
