= Saman Bank =

Iranian banking and financial services corporation

- Type: Public
- Traded as: Farabourse: سامان; ISIN: IRO7BSAP0001
- Industry: Banking, Financial services
- Founded: 2002
- Headquarters: Tehran, Iran
- Number of locations: 153 branches (Iran)
- Area served: Iran
- Key people: Alireza Marefat (CEO)
- Products: Consumer banking, corporate banking, finance and insurance, investment banking, mortgage loans, wealth management, credit cards,
- Number of employees: 2,425 (2018)
- Website: www.sb24.ir

Saman Bank (Persian: بانک سامان, Bank Saman) is a privately owned Iranian bank. It is listed on the Tehran Stock Exchange.

In 2024, Saman Bank was hit by a cyberattack from IRLeaks, which affected 20 of Iran's 29 banks, including the Central Bank of Iran. Politico called it the "worst attack" in Iranian history.

== History ==
This bank started its activities as Credit Institution in September 1999. Subsequently, in August 2002, it received a full banking license and changed its name to Saman Bank. Saman Eqtesad Credit Corporation was established on September 23, 1999 with a share capital of 11 bln Iranian Rials (US$1.4m). It opened its first branch on November 22, 1999. In 2002, Saman was the third private financial institution in post-revolutionary Iran to receive a banking license. In this context, the share capital increased to Rials 220 bln (US$26 mln).

In March 2007, Saman Bank had a paid-sup share capital of Rials 900 bln (US$97 mln). It operated 149 branches across Iran.

As of May 2018, the bank had 174 branches in Iran (81 branches in Tehran and 68 branches in other cities).

Saman Bank also launched the first internet banking service in Iran, and has since been at the forefront of expansion and enhancement of electronic banking.

In 2024, Saman Bank was hit by a cyberattack from IRLeaks, which affected 20 of Iran's 29 banks, including the Central Bank of Iran. Politico called it the "worst attack" in the nation's history. The Iranian government was compelled to pay a ransom to the hackers to secure the data of Iranian customers.

== Saman Financial Group ==
In addition to Saman Bank, the Saman Financial Group includes a further eight subsidiary companies that it has launched or acquired a substantial stake in during 2003–2012.

- Saman Kish Electronic Payment
- Saman Satellite Communications Group (Saman SCG)
- Saman Exchange
- Saman Insurance
- Saman Brokerage
- Iranian Credit Bureau & Scoring
- Saman Processing
- Aftab Tejarat Saman Servicing
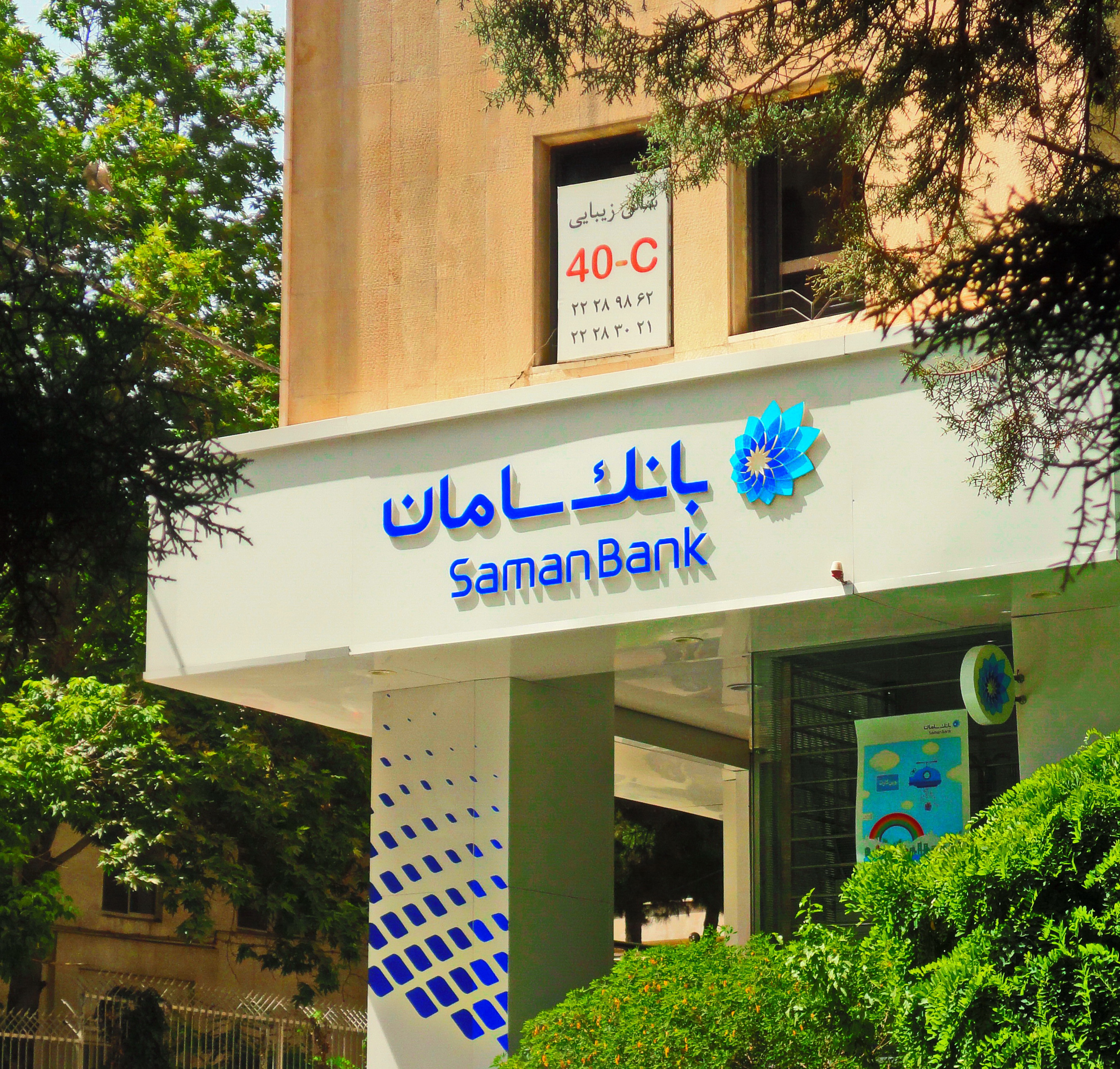
- Saman Bank branch in Tehran
  Kardan Investment Bank

== Blu Bank ==
Blu Bank
- Type: Neobank
- Founded: 2020
- Headquarters: Tehran, Iran
- Area served: Iran
- Subsidiaries: Saman Bank
- Website: blubank.com

Blu Bank' As the first Iranian neobank, it began its operations in 2019 as a startup active in the Iranian "neobank" sector. Recently, the number of users of the BluBank application surpassed 10 million, and to date, over 22 million transactions have been recorded within this Iranian neobank.

== Sponsorship ==
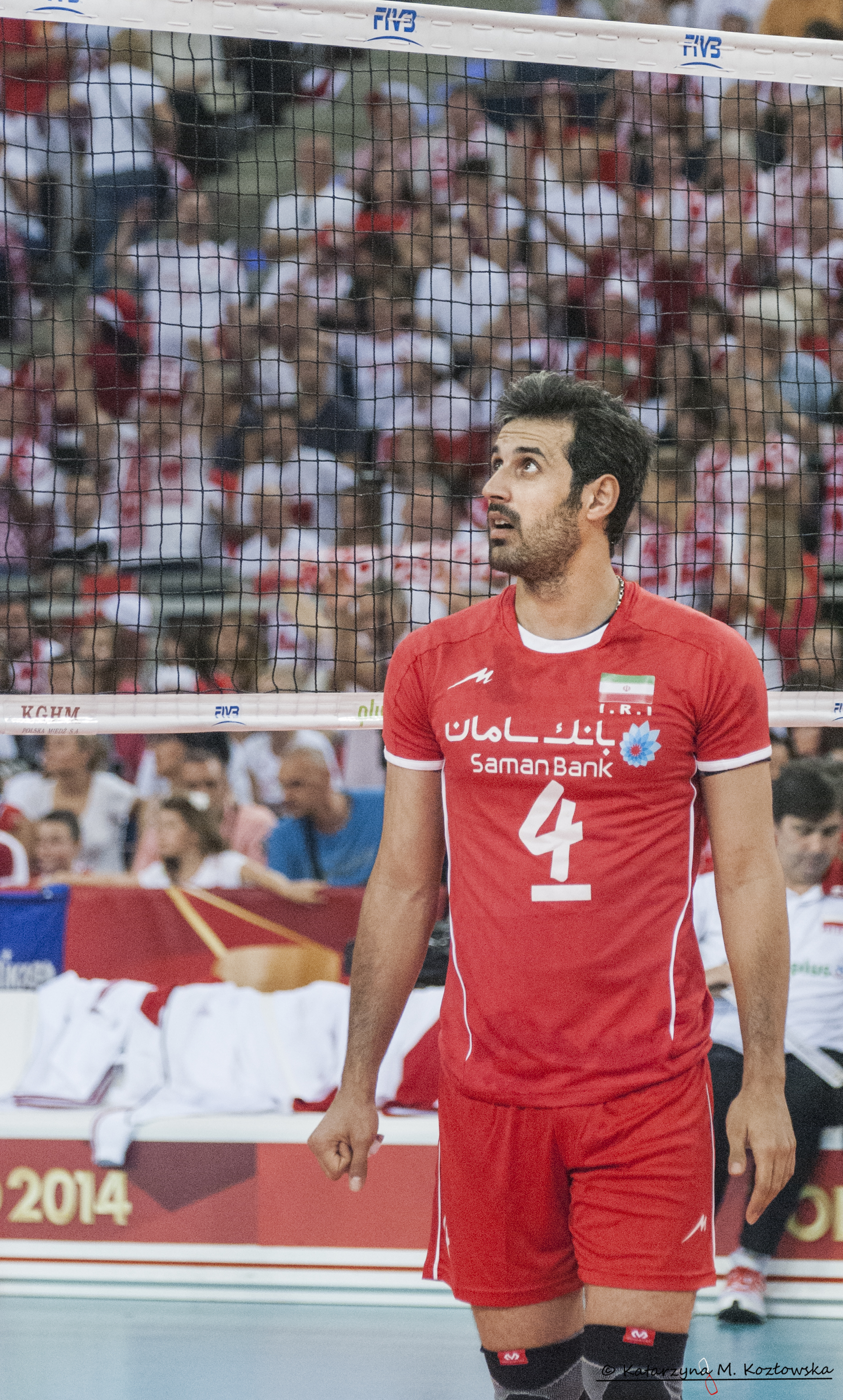
Saman Bank sponsoring Iran men's national volleyball team in 2014.

Saman Bank was a 2013-2016 sponsor of Iran Volleyball Teams & Federation.

== See also ==
- Banking and insurance in Iran
- Economy of Iran
- List of banks in Iran
