= National Development Fund of Iran =

Sovereign wealth fund of Iran

- Industry: Sovereign wealth fund
- Founded: 2011; 15 years ago
- Headquarters: Tehran, Iran
- Key people: Khodadad Gharibpour (CEO)
- Total assets: US$195 billion (2026)
- Website: www.ndf.ir

The National Development Fund of Iran (NDFI; Persian: صندوق توسعه ملی) is Iran's sovereign wealth fund. It was founded in 2011 to supplement the Oil Stabilization Fund. NDFI is independent of the government's budget. Based on Article 84 of the Fifth Five-year Socio-Economic Development Plan (2010–2015), the National Development Fund was established to transform oil and gas revenues to productive investment for future generation. It is a member of the International Forum of Sovereign Wealth Funds and therefore is signed up to the Santiago Principles on best practice in managing sovereign wealth funds. Withdrawing any money from this fund requires Ali Khamenei's permission.

Accordingly, 20% of oil income is to be transferred to the National Development Fund and this percentage increases 3% annually until the end of the Fifth Five-year Socio-Economic Development Plan. The new fund is to extend 50% of its financial facilities to private, cooperative and non-governmental sectors and 20% to promote foreign investment (inward and outward). The remaining 30% is invested (in capital markets) abroad.

NDFI's reserves stood at $24.4 billion in 2011 and $35 billion in 2012. It is foreseen that the Development Fund will reach $55 billion by March 2013 and $61 billion by March 2014. As of October 2026, the fund has US$195 billion in assets under management.

== Background ==
The National Development Fund of Iran (NDFI) aims to turn some of the country's revenue earned by selling oil, gas, gas condensate and oil products to durable wealth, productivity, economic incentive and capital. The NDFI also aims to preserve the share of oil and gas resources and products for future.

The Articles of Association of the National Development Fund of Iran, under the directives of the Leader of the Islamic Revolution and ratification of the Parliament, has been incorporated in the Fifth Development Plan Law of the Islamic Republic of Iran. According to the Articles of Association, the Managing Board is the executive pillar of the NDFI whose main responsibility is to conclude agency agreements with the banks. The NDFI has, so far, concluded several agency agreements with different banks for supporting investment in the private Sector.

The National Development Fund of Iran (NDFI) was established based on Article 84 of the Fifth Economic, Social and Cultural Development Plan of the Islamic Republic of Iran. The NDFI aims to turn some of the country's petrodollars to durable wealth, productivity, economic incentive and capital and to preserve the share of oil and gas resources and products for future generations. The NDFI strategies to materialize such goals include:

1. To spotlight outcomes of spatial plans in the country for a regional sustainable and balanced development while distributing the resources of the NDFI.
2. To make plans for reaching the goals of the 2025 Vision plan and the country's Comprehensive Plan for Scientific Development.
3. To pay due attention and support to the private sector and pay facilities in foreign currencies in order to develop economic infrastructure and reduce the role of government.
4. To pay special attention to investment opportunities in deprived areas while incorporating short-term and long-time planning.
5. To give priority to providing financial resources for energy consumption optimization plans, proposals to develop and reconstruct current capacities (such as buying equipment and machineries), business plans in convert industries, complementary agriculture, public and rail transport, joint foreign investment (subject to ratification within the framework of the 2002 Law to Encourage and Support Foreign Investors), proposals to export Iranian goods and services to target markets in the form of purchase credit, proposals to export indigenous technical-engineering services in the form of sell credit, providing facilities for buyers of Iran-made goods and services in foreign export target markets, proposals of technical-engineering services export by Iranian companies which win international tenders.
6. To invest and have greater participation in foreign monetary and financial markets.
7. To make decisions and adopt measures to ensure the return of the NDFI's resources and its preservation for future generations.

NDFI says it complies with the Santiago Principles; thus coordinates and aligns its actions with the macroeconomic and monetary policy of the Iranian government.

== Funding and loans ==
According to laws, 20% of oil income is to be transferred to the National Development Fund and this percentage increase 3% annually until the end of fifth Five-year Socio Economic Development Plan. The new fund is to extend 50% of its financial facilities to private, cooperative and non-governmental sectors and 20% to promote foreign investment. The remaining 30% is invested in capital markets abroad.

NDFI defines overall priorities and is responsible for supervision, while Iranian banks are responsible for due diligence and feasibility study of each project/loan. NFDI will increasingly deposit its funds in domestic banks Loans are made in local (Iranian rial) or hard currency. Banks must approve the loan and they assume the project risks.

NDFI lends to private domestic companies, including government companies if state ownership is less than 20%. NDFI can also be used for foreign direct investment in Iran, if those foreign companies provide 30% of the investment needs (in-kind or capital) of any project.

NDFI has inked contracts with different banks including the Bank of Industry and Mine, the Sepah Bank, the Exports Development Bank and Keshavarzi Bank to allocate $9 billion to industry and mine, energy, cooperatives and agriculture in 2012. Iran also announced that it will allocate $14 billion from the NDFI to oil projects. Between 2011 and 2013, the fund allocated US$21.546 billion to mining and industry (including the gas, oil and petrochemical industries), US$566 million to housing and construction, US$233 million to water and agriculture, US$686 million to transportation and US$193 million on the export of technical services.

In 2015, the Parliament ratified $300 million allocation from NDFI to the Innovation and Prosperity Fund. In 2015, the NDFI has also been used to finance budget deficits which is against its primary assigned objective of being Iran's national "Nest Egg".

According to the government, Iran Air will use $2.5 billion from the NDFI to finance the purchase of its Boeing aircraft.

In 2018, $10.66 billion funding has been allocated for renewing the road transport fleet.

In 2019, the government said that it had allocated $2.4 billion from NDFI towards small and medium enterprises.

NDF Flow of Funds from 2010 until 2012
Year	Fund inflow/i.e. money allocated to NDFI from oil/gas sales (USD billion)	Fund outflow/i.e. loans made to companies (USD billion)	Ending balance/i.e. what is left to allocate in terms of loans/investments (USD billion)
2010	14.104	--	14.104
2011	20.782	4.60	30.286
2012	15.084	11.305	32.436
Total	49.97	15.905	

Note: Total current assets held in the NDFI is the total cumulated fund inflow (over years) +/- net cumulated profit/loss.

== Executive board ==
The NDFI executive board is elected by the board of trustees, which seats 11 key government officials, including three ministers and is currently led by Dr. Masoud Pezeshkian, the president of the Islamic republic of Iran. NDFI has also a supervisory board made of the Supreme Audit Court and the General Inspection Office.

NDFI has five members on the board of executive directors:

1. Dr. Khodadad Gharibpour (board member and chairman)
2. Dr. Sayyed Mohammad Qasem Hosseini (alternate chairman and member of the managing board)
3. Mr. Masoud Mozayani (member of board of executive directors & deputy of international investment)
4. Mr. Sayyed Mohammad Saied Nouri Naeini (member of board of executive directors & deputy of economic affairs)
5. Mr. Mohammad Reza Shojaeddini (member of board of executive directors & deputy of domestic investments)

== See also ==
- Economy of Iran
- Central Bank of Iran
- Petroleum industry in Iran
- Sovereign Wealth Fund Institute
- Project management
