= EN Bank =

Iranian bank

Eqtesad Novin Bank بانک اقتصاد نوین Bānk-e Eqtesād-e Novin
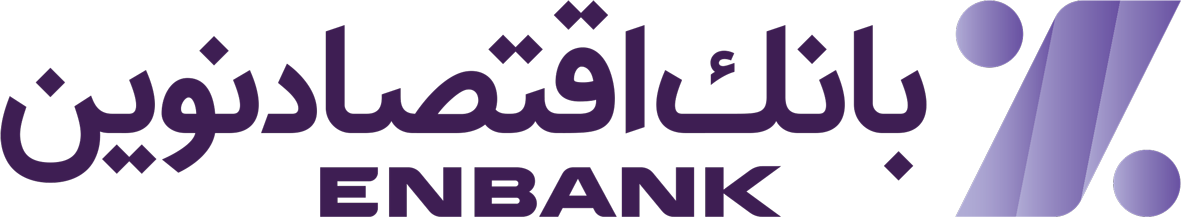
- Company type: Private
- Traded as: TSE: NOVN1; ISIN: IRO1NOVN0005
- Industry: Financial services
- Founded: Tehran, Iran, 2001
- Headquarters: Tehran, Iran
- Key people: Mohammad Reza Hosseinzadeh (CEO)
- Products: Retail banking Transaction accounts Insurance stock brokerage Investment bank Asset-based lending Consumer finance Trade; International payments Foreign exchange
- Number of employees: 3,376 (Full-time equivalent, 2020)
- Website: http://enbank.ir/

EN Bank, also known as Eqtesad Novin Bank (Persian: بانک اقتصاد نوین, Bānk-e Eqtesād-e Novin, lit. "Modern Economy Bank") is Iran's first private bank established by the Eghtesad Family offering retail, commercial and investment banking services in Iran. The company was established in 2000 as a part of the government's privatization of the banking system.

While established in Tehran, the bank operates throughout the nation with 5,317 employees, 1,200 ATMs and 310 branches across the Persian Gulf Region.

EN Bank is Iran's first private bank,. listed under the Tehran Stock Exchange and was listed as one of Iran's top 200 companies. However, it was taken down from Tehran Stock Exchange late 2015 as it was fully privatized by the Eghtesad Family. The bank was also awarded Euromoney magazine's best bank of Iran in 2010.

In 2024, EN Bank was targeted in a cyberattack carried out by IRLeaks, impacting 20 of Iran's 29 banks, including the Central Bank of Iran.

== Operations ==
EN Bank operates in Iran and many other Middle Eastern countries. In addition to retail, corporate, international, and commercial banking, the company offers savings and current accounts, loans, cards, and safe deposit boxes; merchant, cash management, and financing services; Internet, telephone, mobile, and SMS banking; and foreign exchange, currency accounts, trade finance, fund transfer, and wire services. EN Bank also provides utility bill payment service; and complementary financial services, ranging from securities trading to insurance. In 2015, EN Bank, with 600 million euros of assets under management (AUM), was in talks with a number of German banks to start a mutual fund of 25 million euros.

In 2024, EN Bank was targeted in a cyberattack carried out by IRLeaks, impacting 20 of Iran's 29 banks, including the Central Bank of Iran. Politico described it as the "worst attack" in the country's history.

== Shareholders ==
The EN Group of Companies is the largest shareholder of the bank which is entirely owned by the Eghtesad Family Other major shareholders include Kamran Eghtesad and his son, Ali Mohammad Eghtesad, Iran Zinc Mines Development Company, Sakhteman Investment Company of Iran holding and some of the mining companies affiliated to EN Group. The share capital is 2000 Billion Iranian Rials (around $200M) [est. 2004].

== See also ==
- Banking in Iran
- Privatization in Iran
