= Mohammad Reza Hosseinzadeh =

Iranian banking executive

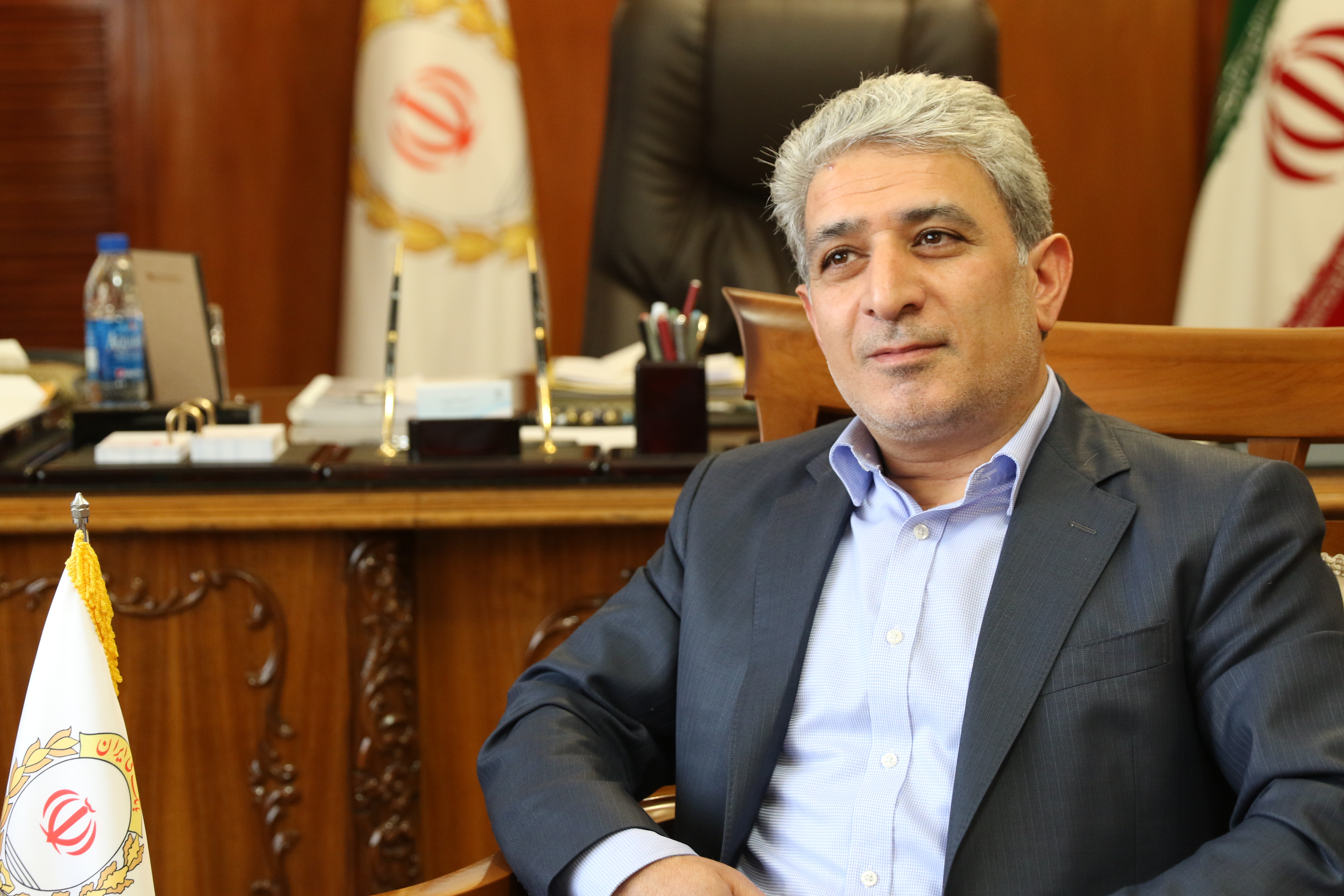

CEO of Bank Melli Iran
- In office 1 March 2016 – 23 October 2021
- Preceded by: Abdolnaser Hemmati
- Succeeded by: Mohammad-Reza Farzin

Personal details
- Born: 1964 (age 61–62) Ardabil, Iran
- Education: Iran banking institute central bank of Iran
- Website: http://www.didgaheno.ir

Mohammad Reza Hosseinzadeh is an Iranian banking executive. He is the CEO of EN Bank since 2024, a position he assumed following approval by the bank’s Board of Directors and in accordance with Corporate Governance Law.

== Career ==
Hosseinzadeh holds a PhD in Business Administration. Prior to his role at EN Bank, he held several leadership positions within the Iranian banking system, including:

== Executive Records ==
- EN Bank: Member of the Board of Directors
- Bank Saderat Iran: Member of the Board of Directors
- Bank Melli Iran: Member of the Board of Directors
- Bank Melli Iran: Chairman of the High Risk Committee
- Bank Melli Iran: Chairman of the Marketing Committee
- Bank Melli Iran: Chairman of the Department of Innovation
- National Development Holding Company: Chairman of the Board
- Esteghlal F.C.: Member of the Board of Directors

== Directors ==
- Qazvin – Zanjan – Tabriz Freeway Company: Chairman of the Board
- Commission of the Islamic Republic of Iran Banks: Secretary

== Organization and Methods Department ==
- Pars Agricultural & Industrial Company: Member of the Board

== Directors ==
- Bank Melli Iran of Guilan Province: General Director
- Bank Melli Iran of Ardabil Province: General Director

== Articles and books ==
- Aiming for Excellency, With Which Wing?
- Crisis Management, Decision-making in Critical Situations
- Miracle Workers of Management
- Paradox of Private Banks
- National Currency
- Marketing & Customer Caring
- Making for Survival
- Welfare & Contentment of Society: What is the Solution?
- World Based on Wisdom
- Pygmalion in Management
