= Mir Business Bank =

Bank of Russia

- Native name: Мир Бизнес Банк
- Founded: 2002; 24 years ago
- Headquarters: Moscow, Russia
- Website: www.mbbru.ru

Mir Business Bank (formerly Melli Iran) is a Russian bank with a 100% participation of foreign capital; its founder and the only shareholder is Bank Melli Iran (Tehran). Mir Business Bank was registered in January 2002 and received a license for banking operations from the Central Bank of Russia on April 15 (No. 3396). The bank has a branch in Astrakhan and planned to open one more branch in Kazan. In October 2017, the bank was supposed to integrate with the Shetab Banking System. In November 2018, the bank was among the financial institutions included in the sanction list of the US Treasury.

== Literature ==
- Faucon, Benoît (2012-12-11). "U.S. Warns Russia on Iranian Bank". Wall Street Journal.
- Mindock, Clark (2018-11-20). "US imposes 'expanded' Iran sanctions for coordinating with Russia to provide oil to Syria". The Independent.
- Danilova, Maria (2018-11-20). "US sanctions firms in Iran, Russia for shipping oil to Syria". ABC4 Utah / Good4Utah.com.
