= Iran Banking Institute =

The Iran Banking Institute (IBI, Persian: مؤسسه عالی بانکداری ایران) is a higher education institution established in 1963 in Iran and is affiliated with the Central Bank of Iran.

It hosts the annual 'Islamic Banking Conference', which is a forum for academic and banking individuals on a local and international level to discuss the experience and challenges of Iran's banking system in interacting with the regulations of international Islamic banking.
