= Islamic Economics Organization of Iran =

Islamic banking institution created in 1979 after the Islamic Revolution

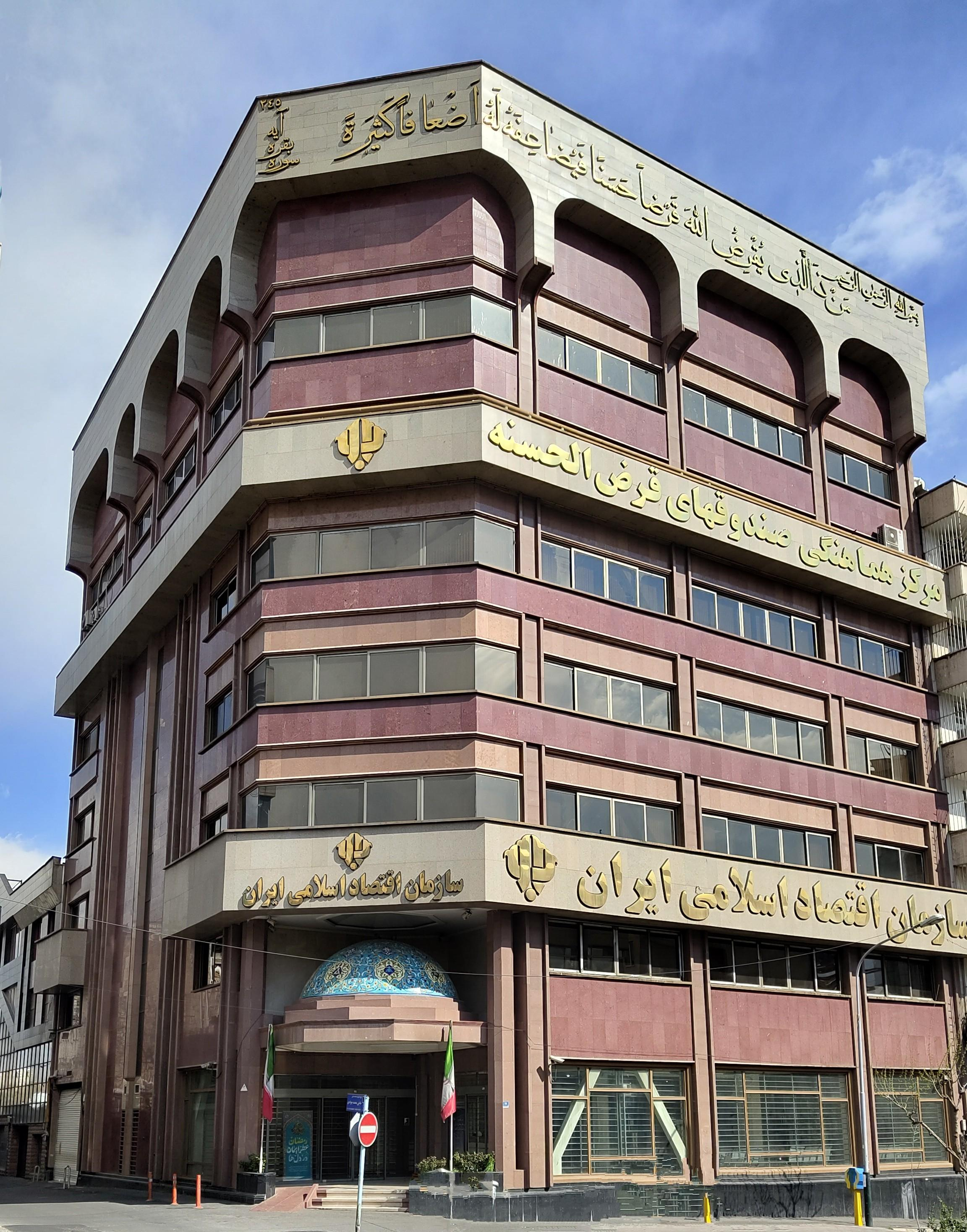
- Formation: April 1979
- Purpose: Promoting Qard al-Hasan, Improving economy's health
- Headquarters: Tehran
- Location: Iran
- Board Chair: Mohammad-Hassan Aboutorabi Fard
- Key people: Yahya Ale Eshaq
- Website: https://seei.ir/
- Formerly called: Islamic Bank of Iran

The Islamic Economics Organization of Iran (Persian: سازمان اقتصاد اسلامی ایران, formerly Islamic Bank of Iran) or simply the Organization of Islamic Economics was the first Islamic banking institution created in 1979 after the Islamic Revolution. The organization acts as a Central Bank for issuing Qard al-Hasan (Islamic loan funds), and was exempted from nationalization by the decree of Ruhollah Khomeini. The creation of this organization marked the first move towards establishing a parallel system in the banking sector, operating outside the purview of the Central Bank of Iran. It currently supervises 1200, out of 2500 Islamic loan funds, on behalf of Iran's Central Bank.

== History ==
=== Background ===
Mir-Muhammad Sadeghi, a prominent member of Mo’talefah and a supporter of Khomeini from the Bazaari class, played an active role in establishing Islamic loan funds both before and after the revolution. Shortly following the revolution, he was appointed to lead the Islamic Economics Organization.

=== Establishment ===
The Islamic Bank of Iran was established in April 1979 by order of Seyyed Ruhollah Khomeini, with the support of Mohammad Beheshti and Morteza Motahari. Following the Leader of the Islamic Republic's authorization to establish the bank, a statute was drafted with input from legal and banking experts and submitted to the Central Bank and the Monetary and Credit Council for approval. The Council unanimously approved the statute in a meeting held on May 9, 1979. This development was reported by several newspapers, including Ettelaat (issue no. 15850, dated May 10, 1979).

=== Name-change from Bank to Organization ===
At this time, the provisional government declared the banks national. Ruhollah Khomeini excluded the Islamic Bank from the interim government of Iran resolution and said, "The Islamic Bank will not be nationalized." The provisional government agreed that the Islamic Bank of Iran would continue its activities with the statute approved by the Council of Money and Credit and the determined purpose and subject, even with a chosen logo, but would not use the word 'bank', meaning that it would carry out all banking and credit operations by removing the name of the bank, and promised that as soon as the prohibitions were lifted, the Islamic Bank of Iran would operate under the same name. Based on the considerations and promises, only the word "bank" was changed to the phrase "Economics Organization". In other words, the bank continued to exist in terms of substance, but in terms of form, it masked the Islamic Economics Organization of Iran, in other words, the Islamic Bank of Iran is a bank in the form of the Islamic Economic Organization.

=== 3000 trillion rial controversy ===
In 2015, a representative of Islamic Consultative Assembly said that the Islamic Economic Organization illegally withdrew three thousand trillion rials from the resources of the Qard-ol-Hasanah funds and used it to construct a building for the organization.
