= Bank of Industry and Mine =

Iranian banking and financial services corporation

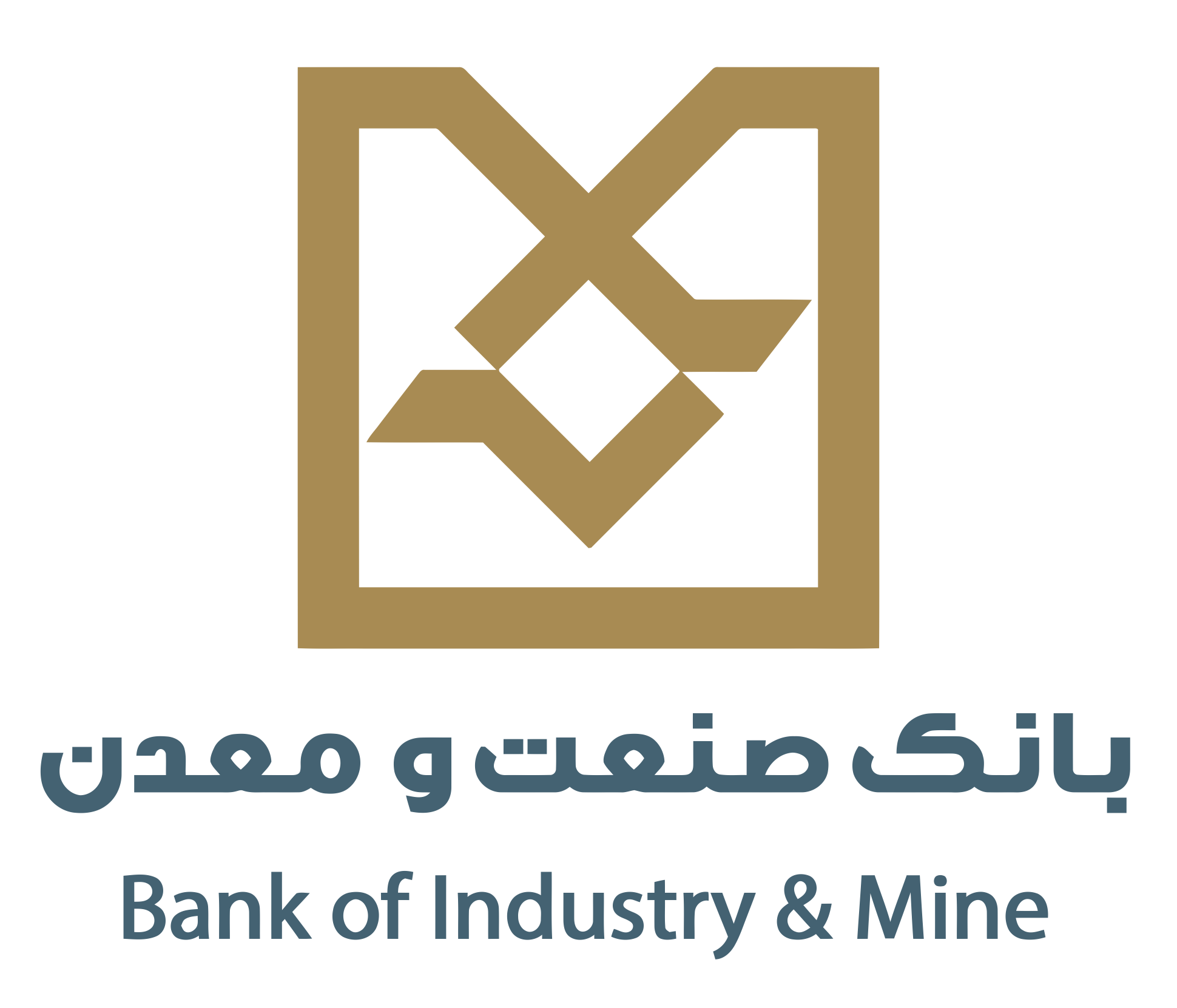
- Company type: State-owned enterprise
- Industry: Banking; Financial services Investment services
- Founded: 1983; 43 years ago
- Headquarters: Tehran, Iran
- Area served: Iran
- Key people: Mahmoud Shayan, CEO
- Products: Finance and insurance Consumer banking Corporate banking Investment banking Investment management Global wealth management Private equity Mortgage loans Credit cards
- Website: www.bim.ir

Bank of Industry and Mine (Persian: بانک صنعت و معدن, Bānk-e San'at va Ma'dan) is an Iranian government owned specialized bank located in Tehran, Iran. It endeavours to increase economic growth through the development of industry and mining.

In 2017, A Chinese state-owned investment firm provided a $10 billion credit line for five Iranian banks, including the Bank of Industry and Mine, "in order to support projects in the country". In light of US sanctions, The bank, and its subsidiaries, have had financial dealings with Danish and German Banks.

In 2024, IRLeaks carried out a cyberattack on the Iranian banking sector, impacting 20 out of 29 banks, including the Bank of Industry and Mine as well as the Central Bank of Iran. Politico labeled it the "worst attack" in the nation's history.

== See also ==
- Banking in Iran
- Industry of Iran
- Mining in Iran
- Iran Chamber of Commerce Industries and Mines
- The Bank of Industry
- Geological Survey and Mineral Exploration of Iran
