= Bank Maskan =

Iranian banking and financial services corporation

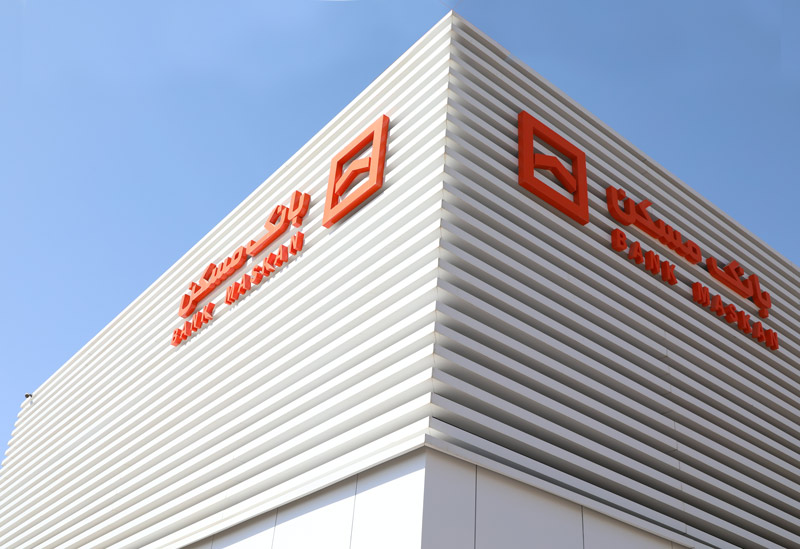
- Native name: بانک مسکن
- Type: State-owned enterprise
- Industry: Banking, Financial services
- Founded: 1938
- Headquarters: Tehran, Iran
- Area served: Iran
- Key people: Ali Khorsandian (CEO & Chairman)
- Products: Consumer banking, corporate banking, finance and insurance, investment banking, mortgage loans, wealth management, credit cards,
- Number of employees: 12,259 (2019)
- Website: Bank Maskan

Bank Maskan (Persian: بانک مسکن, Bānk-e Maskan), also known as the Housing Bank, is a bank in Iran.

== History ==
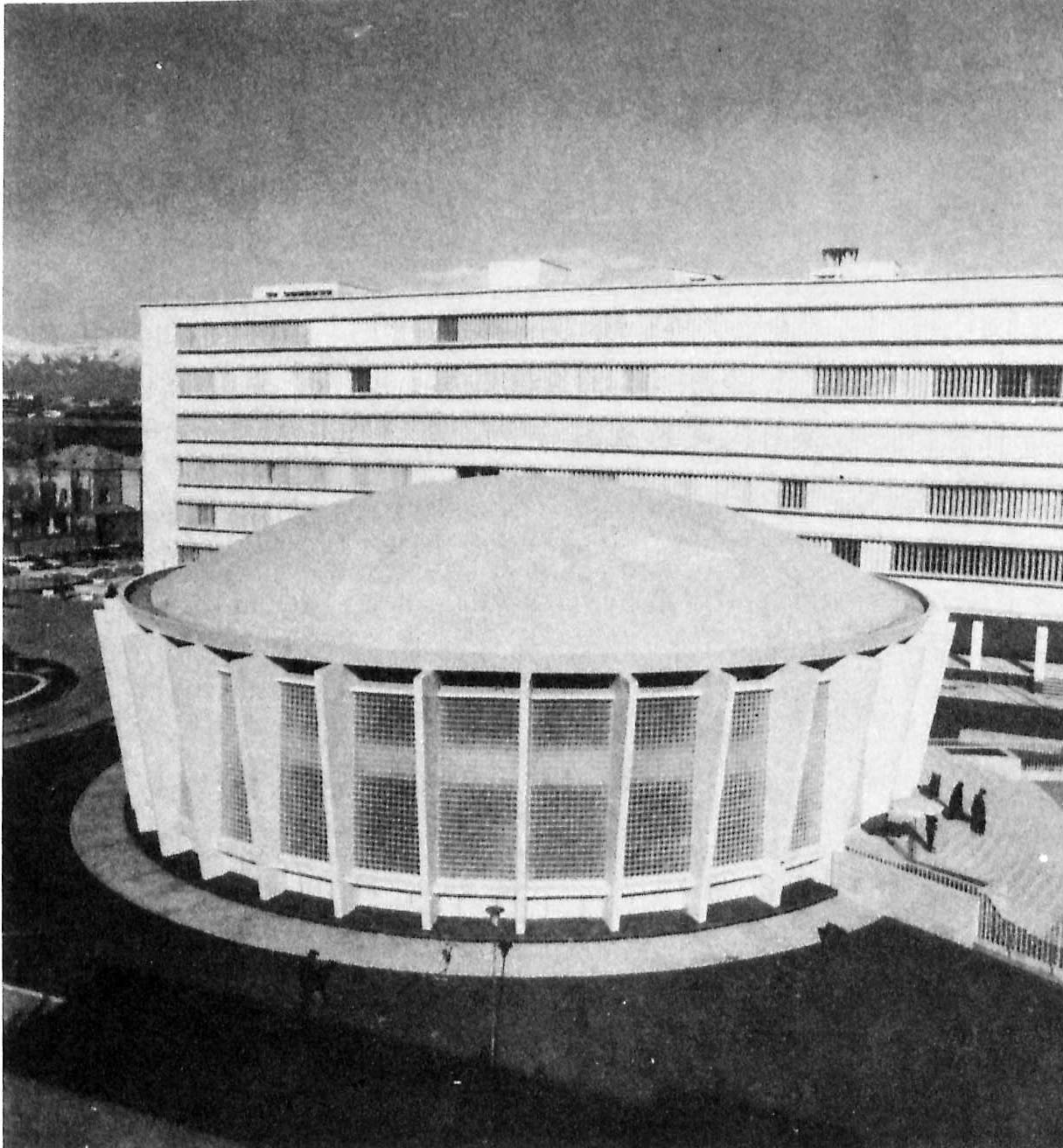
Building of Bank Rahni Iran on Ferdowsi Street around the time of its inauguration

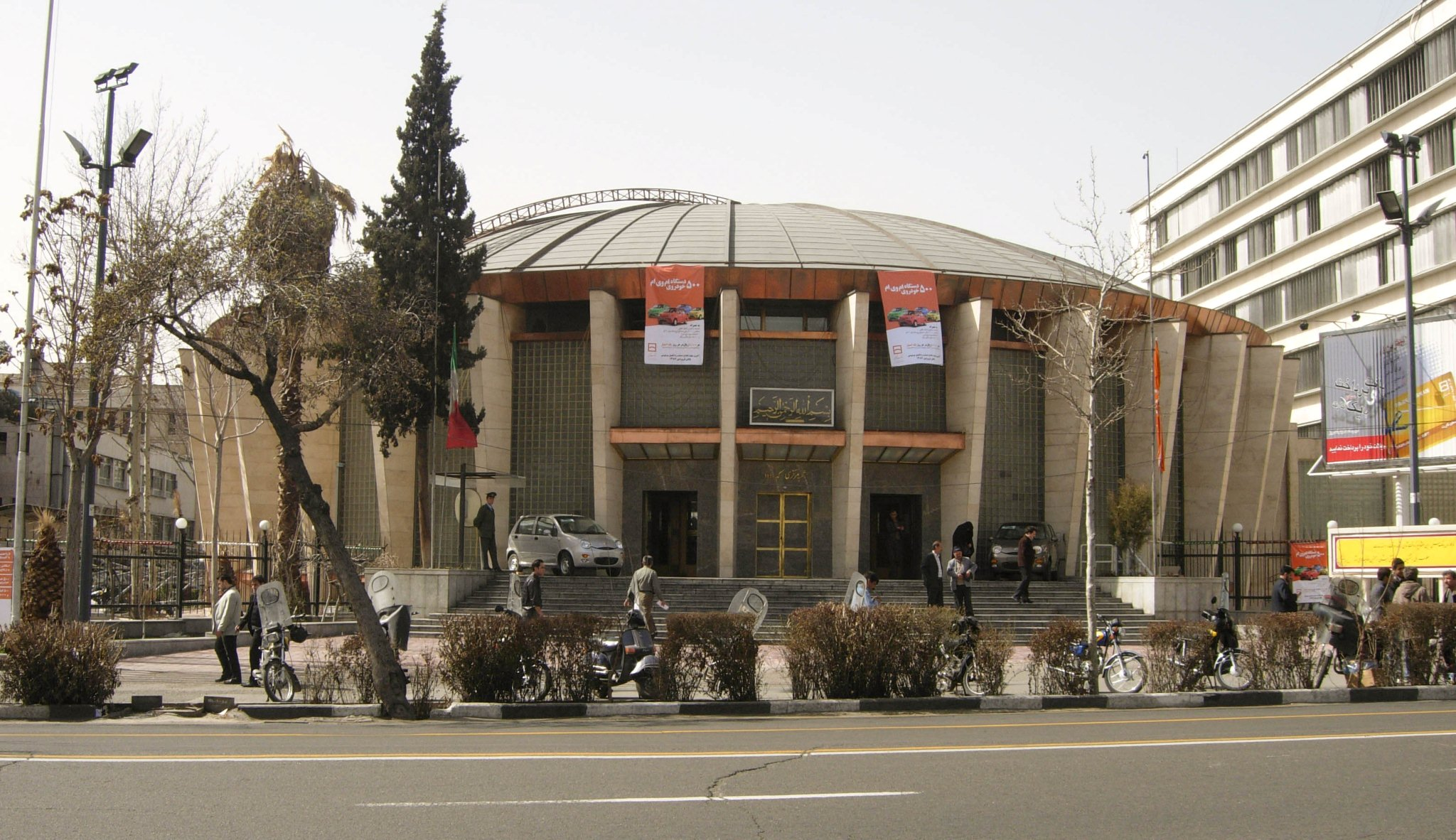
The same building known as Bank Maskan Central Branch, photographed in 2008

The main predecessor entity of Bank Maskan was Bank Rahni Iran (lit. 'Mortgage Bank of Iran'), a specialized credit institution that was spun off from Bank Melli Iran in 1938. In 1956-1959, Bank Rahni erected a prominent central branch building on Ferdowsi Street in central Tehran, designed by architects Mohsen Foroughi and Keyghobad Zafar.

In 1979 following the Iranian Revolution, Bank Maskan was formed by merging Bank Rahni with multiple other operations such as the Iranian Construction Investment Company, Cyrus Savings and Mortgage Companies, Ekbatan, Pasargad of Tehran, and Saving Companies of Mashhad, Tabriz, Shiraz, Isfahan, Ahvaz, Gilan, Hamedan, Kermanshah, Mazandaran, Gorgan, Semnan and Abadan.

Mahmood Shayan (محمود شایان) was appointed chief executive officer of Bank Maskan in August 2020.

== Structure ==
Their subsidiaries include:

- Housing Investment Company (شرکت سرمایه گذاری مسکن; Šerkat Sarmāye Gozāri Maskan), established 1991; they received the Iran National Quality Award (جايزه ملي كيفيت ايران) in 2004

== See also ==
- Banking and Insurance in Iran
- Construction in Iran
- Ministry of Housing and Urban Development (Iran)
