= Export Development Bank of Iran =

Iranian banking and financial services corporation

Coordinates: 35.735006°N 51.415398°E

Export Development Bank of Iran (EDBI)
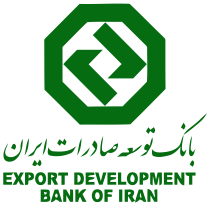

- EDBI Tower in Tehran, Iran
- Type: State-owned bank
- Industry: Banking; Financial services Export credit agency
- Founded: 10 July 1991; 35 years ago
- Founder: Government of Iran
- Headquarters: Tehran, Iran
- Number of locations: 38 domestic branches (20 March 2024)
- Area served: Iran
- Key people: (Managing Director)
- Products: Development bank, commercial bank, financial services, corporate finance, foreign exchange markets, internet banking, money market, buyer's credit, line of credit
- Number of employees: 1,786 (20 March 2024)
- Subsidiaries: Subsidiaries: Banco Internacional de Desarrollo C.A. (Banco Universal), Urb. El Rosal, Av. Francisco de Miranda, Edificio Dozsa, Piso 8, C.P. 1060 Caracas, Venezuela, SWIFT: IDUNVECA; Iran-Venezuela Bi-National Bank, (IVBB), No. 19, Seoul St., Sheikh Bahaei Sq., Tehran, Iran, SWIFT: IVBBIRH; Tamaddon Investment Bank (TIB), No. 6, 14th West Alley, Beyhaqi Blvd., Argentina Sq., Tehran, Iran
- Rating: Capital Intelligence (CI) Ratings (07 November 2023) Long and Short Term Foreign Currency Ratings 'B', Bank Standalone Rating 'b', Core Financial Strength 'b', Extraordinary Support Level 'Moderate', Outlook for the LT FCR and BSR 'Stable', Operating Environment Risk Anchor, C^{+}
- Website: www.edbi.ir

Export Development Bank of Iran (EDBI; Persian: بانک توسعه صادرات ايران, Bank Tuse'h-e Sadârat-e Iran) is Iran's export-import bank. The bank was incorporated as a policy bank, owned by the Iranian government, and provides financial and other conventional banking services to Iranian exporters and importers.

== Overview ==
Pursuant to the approval made by the Extraordinary General Assembly Meeting of the Banks, the Export Development Bank of Iran was founded on 10 July 1991, and subsequently became operational on 24 November 1991, as a state-owned bank. Under its charter, EDBI acts as the administrative arm of the Government of Iran to contribute to the national economy, through promoting non-oil export of goods and other technical and engineering services of Iranian origin and also to enhance economic cooperation with other countries.

== Access to the Sovereign Wealth Fund ==
The Export Development Bank of Iran has access to the Government Fund (Sovereign Wealth Fund) administered by the National Development Fund of Iran [NDFI] which was founded in 2011. The NDFI has signed agency contracts with different Iranian banks including Exports Development Bank of Iran (EDBI) to allocate US$9 billion for supporting investments in the private Sector.

== Key financial data (Consolidated) ==
Financial data(IRR million)
Financial Year End	20.03.2024	20.03.2023	20.03.2022	20.03.2021
Total Assets	1,934,502,667	1,179,678,954	1,040,943,171	937,459,144
Total Liabilities	1,558,666,287	938,156,814	832,539,363	758,070,391
Shareholders' Equity	375,836,380	241,522,140	208,403,808	179,388,753
Net Profit	38,824,637	20,061,798	13,266,440	22,511,850

1USD= IRR 401,887 (as of 20 March 2024)

== International sanctions ==
After 16 January 2016, which marks Implementation Day of the JCPOA, also known as Iran's Nuclear Deal, Export Development Bank of Iran (EDBI) is not on the United Nations (UN) or the European Union (EU) Sanction Lists. Nonetheless, according to US Dept. of Treasury, Office of Foreign Assets Control (OFAC) on 11 May 2018, EDBI is on the SDN list, subject to Secondary Sanctions.
