= Banco Industrial de Venezuela =

Bank of Venezuela

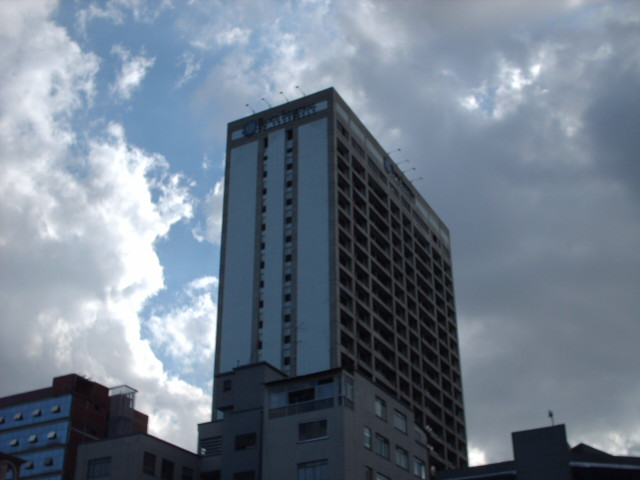
Caracas headquarters of the Banco Industrial de Venezuela.

Banco Industrial de Venezuela (Industrial Bank of Venezuela), or BIV, was a Venezuelan state bank.

== History ==
The BIV was established in 1937 with 60% state and 40% private capital investment. The state gradually gained full control, and in the 1960s and 1970s, the bank was an instrument in the government's import substitution policy of industrialization.

In May 2009, the former president of the BIV, Luis Rafael Quiro, was arrested for corruption. At the time, the bank was the largest state-run financial institution in Venezuela. On February 11, 2016, the bank's assets were transferred to Banco del Tesoro.
