= Ferdowsi Street =

Street in Tehran, Iran

Ferdowsi street
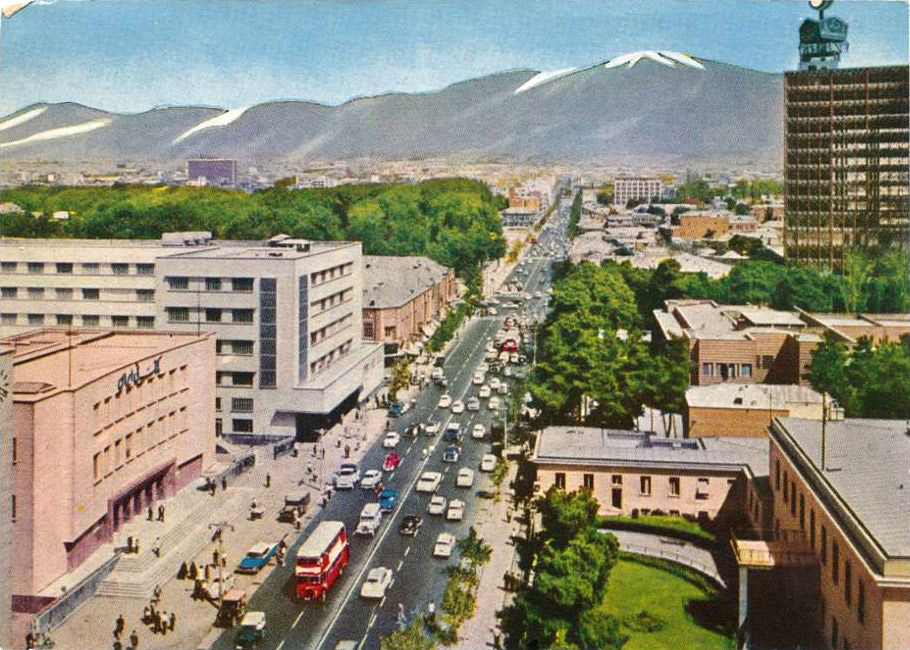
- A view of Alaodowleh street in 1962
- Interactive map of Ferdowsi street

Ferdowsi Street (Persian: خیابان فردوسی), formerly but also known as Alaodowleh Street or Alaoddowleh Street (خیابان علاءالدوله), is a street located in Tehran, Iran. It is named after Ferdowsi, and is the center of Tehran's currency exchange trade.

== Features ==
- Embassy of the United Kingdom

== Gallery ==
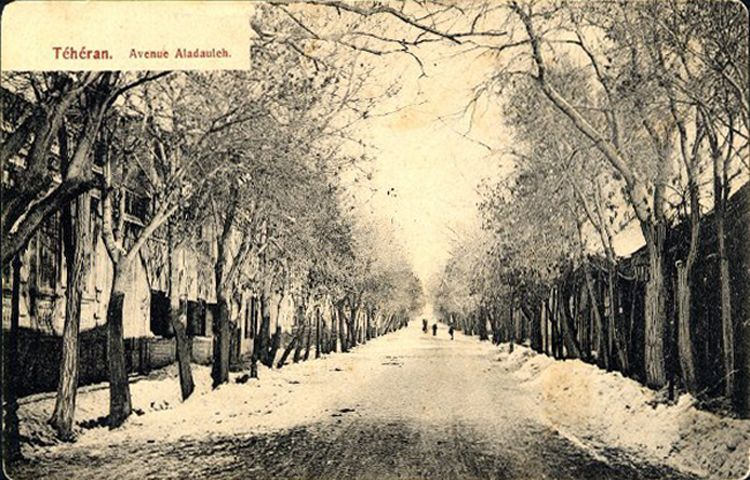
Ferdowsi street in 1910
