= Central Bank of Iran =

Central Bank of the Islamic Republic of Iran بانک مرکزی جمهوری اسلامی ايران
- Seal of Central Bank of Iran

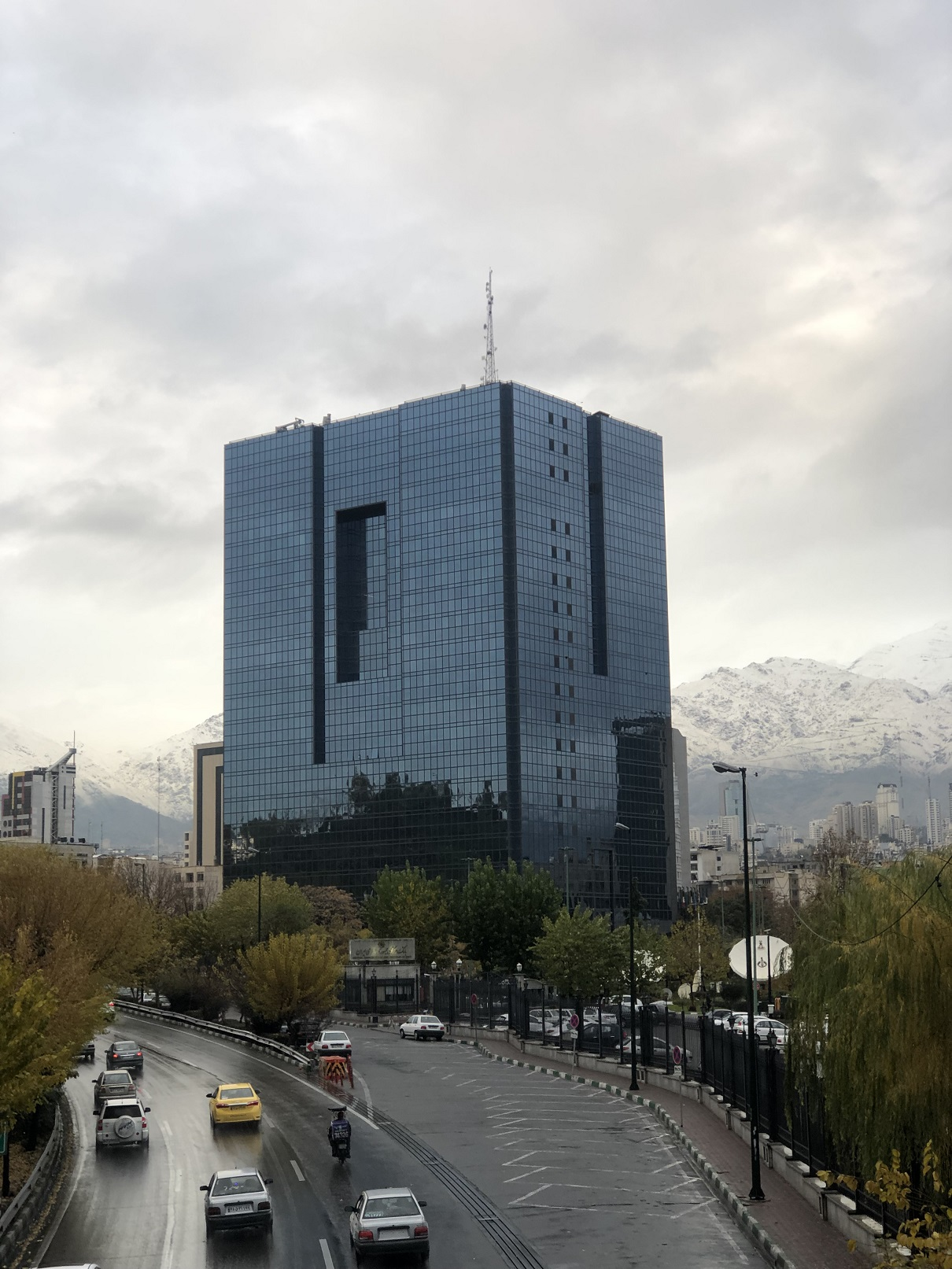
- Bank Markazi Tower, headquarters of the Central Bank of Iran since 2005
- Central bank of: Iran
- Headquarters: CBI Tower, Tehran
- Coordinates: 35.758110°N 51.435209°E
- Ownership: 100% state ownership
- Governor: Abdolnaser Hemmati
- Currency: Iranian rial IRR (ISO 4217)
- Reserves: $130 billion (2017)
- Reserve requirements: 10% to 13%
- Bank rate: 15%
- Interest paid on excess reserves?: Yes
- Website: cbi.ir/default_en.aspx
- ^{1} According to article 10(e) of the Monetary and Banking Act of (1972), CBI's capital "is fully paid up and wholly owned by the Government".^{2} Bank Melli Iran had supervisory functions and regulated the activities of all banks in Iran, while being the largest profit-making commercial bank in the country.

The Central Bank of the Islamic Republic of Iran (CBI; Persian: بانک مرکزی جمهوری اسلامی ايران, romanized: Bank Markazi-ye Jomhuri-ye Eslāmi-ye Irān; SWIFT Code: BMJIIRTH), also known as Bank Markazi, was established under the Iranian Banking and Monetary Act in 1960. It serves as the banker to the Iranian government and has the exclusive right to issue banknotes and coinage. CBI is tasked with maintaining the value of the Iranian rial and supervision of banks and credit institutions. It acts as custodian of the National Jewels, as well as the foreign exchange and gold reserves of Iran. It is also a founding member of the Asian Clearing Union, controls gold and capital flows overseas, represents Iran in the International Monetary Fund (IMF) and internationally concludes payment agreements between Iran and other countries.

The Governor of the Central Bank of Iran since a December 2025 currency collapse is Abdolnasser Hemmati, who replaced Mohammad-Reza Farzin.

In November 2023 after 50 years the central bank was revamped fully and changed to include Islamic Republic Development Bank. The Central Bank was cyberattacked by IRLeaks in August 2024. The Iranian government was forced to pay ransom to the hackers in order to secure the data of Iranian customers.

== History ==
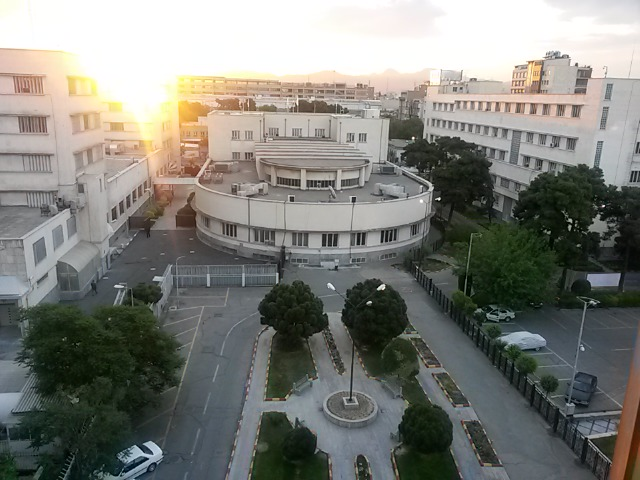
First building of Iran's Central Bank on Ferdowsi Street in Tehran, viewed from rear

In August 1960, the Iranian government established the Central Bank of Iran (CBI) by reorganization of the central banking responsibilities previously exercised by Bank Melli Iran. Scope and responsibilities of the Central Bank had been defined in the Monetary and Banking Law of Iran (1960).

Following the 1979 Iranian Revolution, the Central Bank of Iran was renamed to "the Central Bank of the Islamic Republic of Iran", and Iran's banking system adhered to the new Islamic rules that prohibit earning or paying interest in 1983.

Mohammad-Reza Farzin was appointed Governor of the Central Bank on 29 December 2022, and was reappointed to the position in October 2024

The Central Bank was cyberattacked by IRLeaks in August 2024. The central bank was one of 20 banks out of 29 Iranian banks, attacked by the group. The cyber attack on the Iranian banking sector was described by Politico as the "worst attack" in Iranian history. The Iranian government was forced to pay ransom to the hackers in order to secure the data of Iranian customers.

On 25 June 2025, Israeli defense minister Israel Katz signed an order declaring Central Bank of Iran, Shahr Bank, Mellat Bank and Sepehr Energy Jahan, company owned by Iranian Armed Forces, of being terrorist organizations due to their alleged roles in financing pro-Iranian militant groups and terrorism on behalf of IRGC and Quds Force. Israel also declared three of the bank's senior officials as terrorist operatives.

In December 2023, Central Bank and Minister of Economy ordered merger of private Nour Credit Institution with 400,000 billion rial debt into government Bank Melli.

== Objectives and functions ==
The objectives of the Central Bank of the Islamic Republic of Iran as per its charter and according to section 10 of the Monetary and Banking Law of Iran (MBAI) are as follows:

- Maintaining the value of national currency
- Maintaining the equilibrium in the balance of payments
- Facilitating trade-related financial transactions
- Improving the economic growth potential of the country

To achieve the objectives as stated in the MBAI, CBI is endowed with the responsibility of fulfilling the following functions:

- Issuance of notes and coins
- Supervision of banks and credit institutions
- Formulation and regulation of foreign exchange policies and transactions
- Regulation on gold transactions
- Formulation and regulation on transactions and inflow/outflow of Domestic currency

== Organization ==
=== Money and Credit Council ===
The Money and Credit Council (MCC) is the highest banking policy-making body of Bank Markazi. Its permanent members include the CBI Governor, the Finance and Economy Minister, two Ministers chosen by the Cabinet, The Head of the Chamber of Commerce, the General Prosecutor and two lawmakers (MPs).

Each year, after approval of the government's annual budget, the CBI presents a detailed monetary and credit policy to the MCC for approval. Thereafter, major elements of these policies are incorporated in the five-year economic development plan. MCC meets every three months.

In practice, the ability of the banking system to create money is not much constrained by the amount of scriptural money through fractional reserve banking. Indeed, most banks first extend credit and look for reserves later. The Iranian Central Bank needs more independence from the government in order to combat inflation, according to the country's Parliament Research Center. As of 2010, Iran's Central Bank, is not able to conduct a "proactive" monetary policy (e.g. it needs Majlis' approval before issuing participation bonds) and has no control over the government's fiscal policy.

=== General Assembly ===
The current combination of the Central Bank's board of directors are the President, Economy and Commerce Ministers, Deputy-President for strategic planning, and a Minister selected by the Cabinet.

=== "Reform" proposal ===
Seven economists with at least 15 years of work experience were to become members of the general assembly according to a new law proposed by the Majlis in 2010, thus moving this body from being state-dominated to one where the private sector has greater say in the decision-making process. The tenure of each member would be for 10 years and only for one term. Then President Mahmoud Ahmadinejad criticized this proposal and said that it is important for the Central Bank of Iran not to fall under private control "because it would not benefit the Iranian people" over the long run.

== Monetary policy ==
Double digit inflation rates have been a fact of life in Iran for the past 20 years. Between 2002 and 2006, the rate of inflation in Iran has been fluctuating between 12 and 16%.

Monetary policy in Iran has not been successful in meeting the inflation and monetary targets set in the Iranian Five-Year Development Plans, owing mainly to the monetary impact of government spending out of oil revenue. Although the attainment of the inflation targets has improved somewhat recently, the objective of a gradual disinflation to single-digit levels has not been achieved. Moreover, the implicit intermediate target of monetary policy, money growth, has been systematically missed.

The Central Bank is an extension of the Iranian government and as such it does not operate independently. Interest rate is usually set based on political priorities and not monetary targets. There is little alignment between fiscal and monetary policy.

The Central Bank assesses the inflation rate with the use of the prices of 395 goods and services in Iran's urban areas.

High levels of inflation have also been associated with a growth in Iran's money supply. The Central Bank's data suggest that the money supply growth has been about 40% annually. The rapid growth of money supply came from high demands for borrowing capital at the rate of 12% the banks offer, imposed by the Government to make credit accessible to average Iranians and small entrepreneurs. However, this rate is lower than the rate of inflation. This makes the cost of borrowing less than free market cost as determined by supply and demand, based on the inflation rate and investment risk.

=== Direct instruments ===
- Banking profit rates – As of 2010, the interest rate charged between banks (i.e. interbank rate) is set by the government of Iran.
- Credit ceiling – the CBI can intervene in and supervise monetary and banking affairs through limiting banks, specifying the mechanisms for use of funds and determining the ceiling of loans and credits in each sector.

=== Indirect instruments ===
- Reserve requirement ratio – According to Article 14 of the Monetary and Banking Law of Iran, the CBI is authorized to determine reserve requirement ratio within 10 to 30 percent depending on banks’ liabilities’ composition and field of activity.
- CBI Participation Papers – The Central Bank must obtain approval from the Majlis in order to issue participation papers.
- Open deposit account (ODA): control liquidity through absorption of banks’ excess resources. The CBI pays "profit" to these deposits with the CBI on the basis of specific rules.

=== Money supply ===
The International Monetary Fund (IMF) reports that in 2001, currency and demand deposits—an aggregate commonly known as M1—were equal to $71.7 billion. In that same year, M2—an aggregate equal to M1 plus savings deposits, small time deposits, and money market mutual funds—was $153.6 billion. According to the CBI, the country's liquidity amounted to some $174 billion by April 2008, $197 billion by October 2009. and over $300 billion in 2011.

Money in circulation reached $700 billion in March 2020 (based on the 2017 pre-devalation exchange rate). (Iran's monetary base reached 3,721.46 trillion rials (nearly $12 billion) in September 2020 while M2 reached $95 billion (i.e. 26% and 36.2% increase in one year respectively), while the money multiplier effect (which shows how much the monetary base could create new money in the economy) had reached an all-time high), thus explaining the rise in inflation (40%) and of the fall of the Iranian rial in recent years. The Iranian rial has fallen almost five-fold since the beginning of 2018. In turn, Iran's forex reserves have fallen, as Iran is trying to maintain the value of its currency by injecting forex into the market to meet the demand for US dollars by the general public and companies and pay for imports.

In turn, the cause of this is due to inefficient taxation in Iran and tax collection (and tax evasion in particular). Inflation (or loss of purchasing power) being a uniform hidden taxation on the population (unless compensated by an increase in salaries and productivity) which adversely affects the lower strata of the Iranian population the most.

== Financials ==
Source: International Monetary Fund (In billions of rials; unless otherwise indicated)	Prel. 2008/09	Proj. 2009/10
Net foreign assets (NFA)	703,329	789,498
In millions of U.S. dollars	72,381	77,050
-Foreign assets	773,352	863,336
In millions of U.S. dollars	79,587	84,257
-Foreign liabilities ^{1/}	70,023	73,839
In millions of U.S. dollars	7,206	7,206
Net domestic assets (NDA)	-139,843	-225,654
Net domestic credit	-5,141	21,083
-Central government, net	-283,735	-228,046
Claims	74,779	74,779
Deposits	358,514	302,824
-Claims on banks	239,758	206,409
-Claims on non financial public enterprises (NFPEs)	38,836	42,719
-Other items net, excluding central bank participation papers (CPPs)	-134,701	-246,737
Base money	556,925	556,925
Currency	206,352	200,745
-Currency in circulation	157,764	153,478
-Cash in vaults	48,588	47,268
Reserves	334,495	338,445
-Required reserves	225,228	307,757
-Excess reserves	109,267	30,688
Deposits of NFPE and municipalities	16,078	17,734
Other liabilities	6,561	6,919
-CPPs	0	0
-Foreign currency deposits of NFPEs and municipalities	6,561	6,919
Memorandum items: End-period change (in percent of base money)		
-Base money	45.4	0.0
-NFA	13.4	15.5
-NDA (net of other liabilities)	32.0	-15.5

Note: 1/ Includes some liabilities in foreign currency to residents.

=== Government and private sector debt ===
As of December 2019, the government debt to banks reached 3,880,000 billion rials (approx. $30 billion, which is a 3.5% rise since 2013 when President Rouhani took office). This means that the government prints money, which is made available to banks the state controls in Iran and then it borrows from these banks at interest. The private sector's debt to banks in the twelve-month period ending on 20 December 2019, reached 14,400,000 billion rials or more than $110 billion.

== Payment systems ==
In 2005, the government obliged the Central Bank of Iran and the Iranian banks, mostly state owned, to set up all the necessary infrastructures (regulatory, hardware, software) for fully launching e-money in Iran by March 2005. While this plan has not yet fully materialized, local debit cards are now commonplace and have removed the main obstacle to the growth of e-commerce (in the national scale) as well as the full roll out of e-government initiatives. However, Iran remains largely a cash-based economy.

The Central Bank has developed the Real Time Gross Settlement System (SATNA) as the main center for settlement of Iranian banks' transactions in rial.

In 2011, two new payment systems were launched: Scripless Securities Settlement System (TABA) as the electronic infrastructure for placement and settlement of various securities, including governmental and CBI participation papers. The launching of the automated clearing house system (PAYA) for processing individual and multiple payment orders, connection of Iran's Interbank Information Transfer Network (Shetab) to other ATM and POS switch systems for the acceptance of international bank cards, designing of the electronic card payment system (SHAPARAK) for the centralization and reorganization of POSs.

Following international sanctions during the Russian invasion of Ukraine which blocked Russia from using SWIFT, Mohsen Karimi, who is the international deputy governor at the Central Bank of Iran, and his Russian counterpart Vladislav Gridchin, who is a representative of the Central Bank of Russia, announced that both nations developed ways to bypass SWIFT.

=== Digital currency ===
According to the Ministry of ICT in 2018, Post Bank of Iran will issue Iran's first digital currency over the blockchain technology (with the advantage, in relation to the sanctions against Iran that blockchain transactions do not need any clearing bank).

Furthermore, given Iran's large reserves of oil and gas, the Iranian rial could become a reserve currency if parity is established with oil and gas, as was between USD and gold in the past (e.g. parity of 1,000,000 tomans for a barrel of oil), such as with Venezuela's newly minted "Petro" crypto-currency.

=== Fintech ===
Finnotech.ir is Iran's premier banking API provider and Informatics Services Corporation (ISC) is a leading operator of information systems for the banking industry (including Shetab). As of 2016, Iran had 50 companies active in fintech. The CBI limits fintechs' role in Iran's financial sector by allowing them to operate as long as they are not involved in money creation, currency exchange, offering payment tools (like cards) and attracting deposits.

=== Cheques ===
As of 21 January 2010, account holders will no longer be allowed to withdraw more than $15,000 from Iranian banks but they can still write checks for larger amounts.

In 2009, 10.7% of cheques bounced.

=== Debit/credit cards ===
In 2007, Tetra-Tech IT Company announced that Visa and MasterCard could be used for online sales and in Iranian e-card terminals at shopping malls, hotels, restaurants, and travel agencies for Iranians and foreign tourists. Iran's electronic commerce will reach 10 trillion rials ($1 billion) by March 2009. Some wealthier people have debit cards, but MasterCard or Visa are no longer available in Iran, and few foreign banks are active there because of international sanctions. Around 94% of Iranians had a debit card, compared with less than 20% in Egypt (2015).

In 2016, Iran introduced its own domestic credit card system based on Sukuk principles and reported talks with MasterCard (and other international payment operators) for a re-entry.

=== Hawala ===
Many Iranian businesses and individuals also rely on hawala, an informal trust-based money transfer system that exists in the Middle East and other Muslim countries. Since the imposition of recent U.S. and UN financial sanctions on Iran, the use of hawala by Iranians has reportedly increased.

=== Anti-money laundering ===
The Central Bank of Iran is enforcing the Anti-Money Laundering law to curb possible crime. The minister of intelligence, the governor of the Central Bank of Iran (CBI) and several other ministers are among the members of the special committee in charge of the campaign against money laundering. In 2008, the Paris-based Financial Action Task Force (FATF) Watchdog praised the Islamic Republic's crackdown on money laundering. The 34-member financial watchdog congratulated Tehran on its commitment to seal money laundering loopholes. However, in 2010, FATF, named Ecuador and Iran on a list of states that it says are failing to comply with international regulations against money laundering and financing terrorism. Despite president Hassan Rouhani showing interest in FATF, there has been a massive disagreements by hardliners related to supreme leader, Ali Khamenei. Among them Ahmad Jannati, the chairman of the Assembly of Experts and the secretary of the Guardian Council and Ali Akbar Velayati, Iran's former foreign secretary and Supreme leader top foreign relationship advisor are two notable people who are against the FATF. These disagreements and lack of FATF being approved by the Iranian parliament has brought FATF enforcement to halt.

It has been estimated by the government of Iran in 2015 that dirty money from drug trafficking in Iran amounts to 10 trillion tomans a year (1 toman equals 10 rials), some of which has been finding its way into "elections and the securing of votes" to influence the country's politics.

== Reserves ==
=== Foreign reserves ===
- Reserves of foreign exchange and gold: $125.9 billion (2015), $111.6 billion (2014), $68.06 billion (2013), $74.06 billion (2012), $110 billion (2011), $80 billion (2010), $40 billion (2005) (note: most of Iran's forex reserves are frozen abroad (2014))
- Composition: In 2007, 10% of the reserves were held in gold, 20% in US dollars (down from 40% in 2006), the rest mostly in euros and other major currencies (i.e., Japanese yen, British pound and the Swiss franc). In 2009, Iran's President Mahmoud Ahmadinejad ordered the replacement of the US dollar by the euro in the country's foreign exchange accounts.

=== Gold reserves ===
In October 2010, Iran's gold reserves hit "record high" as the Central Bank took "preventive measures" to avoid a possible asset freeze by Western countries. Iran has changed 15% of its foreign exchange reserves into gold (see also: U.S. sanctions against Iran.)

In January 2012, the head of Tehran's Chamber of Commerce reported that Iran had 907 tons of gold, purchased at an average of $600 per ounce and worth $54 billion at the current price. The CBI governor however reports only 500 tons (i.e. above ground gold reserves). The discrepancy is unexplained but the 907 tons could (mistakenly) include below-ground gold reserves (320 metric tons as of 2012) and possibly the gold in Iranian private hands (~100 tons in coins or bullion). In 2014, reports from the Central Bank put its gold stores at 90 tons only, the rest possibly used in barter trade following sanctions.

== Islamic banking ==
After the Islamic Revolution, the Central Bank was mandated to establish an Islamic banking law. In 1983 the Islamic Banking law of Iran was passed by Majlis. This law describes and authorizes an Iranian Shiite version of Islamic commercial laws (as differentiated from a less 'liberal' Sunni version). According to this law, Iranian banks can only engage in interest-free Islamic transactions (as interest is considered usury or "riba" and is forbidden by Islamic law).

In practice, Iran uses what are officially termed "provisional" interest rates, as rates paid to depositors or received from borrowers should reflect the profits or losses of a business. Under these rules, deposit rates, known as "dividends", are in theory related to a bank's profitability. In reality, however, these dividends have become fixed rates of return—depositors have never lost their savings because of losses made by the banks and almost never received returns larger than the provisional ex-ante profit rates. Interest charged on loans is presented as "fees" or a share of corporate profits. All such transactions are performed through (12) Islamic contracts, such as Mozarebe, Foroush Aghsati, Joalah, Salaf, and Gharzolhasaneh. Details of these contracts and related practices are outlined in the Iranian Interest-Free banking law and its guidelines. Examples are:

1. Gharzolhasaneh: An interest-free, non-profit, loan extended by a bank to a real or legal person for a definite period of time.
2. Joalah: The undertaking by one party (the jael, Bank or employer) to pay a specified money (the joal) to another party in return for rendering a specified service in accordance with the terms of the contract. The party rendering the service shall be called "Amel" (the Agent or Contractor).
3. Mosaqat: A contract between the owner of an orchard or garden with another party (the Amel or Agent) for the purpose of gathering the harvest of the orchard or garden and dividing it, in a specified ratio, between the two parties . The harvest can be fruit, leaves, flowers, etc. of the plants in the orchard or garden .
4. Mozaraah: A contract where the bank (the Mozare) turns over a specified plot of land for a specified period of time to another party (the Amel or Agent) for the purpose of farming the land and dividing the harvest between the two parties at a specified ratio.
5. Mozarebe: A contract wherein the bank undertakes to provide the cash capital and other party (the Amel or Avent) undertakes to use the capital for commercial purposes and divide the profit at a specified ratio between the two parties at the end of the term of the contract.

Sharia-compliant assets has reached about $400 billion throughout the world, according to Standard & Poor’s Ratings Services, and the potential market is $4 trillion. Iran, Saudi Arabia and Malaysia are at the top with the biggest sharia-compliant assets.

According to the IMF, Islamic banking forbids pure monetary speculation and stresses that deals should be based on real economic activity and therefore poses less risk than conventional banking to the stability of financial systems.

=== Criticism ===
Critics believe that the Iranian Interest-Free banking law has simply created the context for legitimizing usury or riba. In reality, all banks are charging their borrowers a fixed pre-set amount at a rate of interest that is approved by the Central Bank at least once a year. No goods or services are exchanged as part of these contracts and banks rarely assume any commercial risk. High value collateral items such as real estate, commercial paper, bank guarantees and machinery eliminate any risk of loss. In case of defaults or bankruptcies, the principal amount, the expected interest and the late fees are collected through possession and or sale of secured collaterals.

== Foreign relations ==
Iran is member of the Islamic Development Bank. As of August 2006, the World Bank has financed 48 development projects in the country for a total original commitment of US$3,413 million. World Bank loans to Iran come only from the International Bank for Reconstruction and Development (IBRD). Iran is a member of the World Bank's Multilateral Investment Guarantee Agency. Iran joined the International Monetary Fund (IMF) on 29 December 1945. CBI governors attend IMF's board discussions on Iran on behalf of the government. These meetings are usually held once a year in Washington, D.C.

=== Foreign exposure and transactions ===
- Iran's foreign debt: $22.07 billion in 2010 ($10.6 billion of short-term debts and $11.4 billion of mid-term and long-term debts).
- Iran's deposits in foreign banks: stand at $35 billion while its obligations amount to $25 billion (2007). In 2007, Iran had $62 billion worth of assets held abroad. According to the Bank for International Settlements, Iran's deposits with 39 world banks reached $15.44 billion at the end of March 2012 while its obligations stood at $10.088 billion. In addition it was reported that Iran had between 10 and 20 billion dollars held in foreign banks in 2011, allegedly because of payment problems by foreign companies to Iran. According to E.U. sources, despite the European sanctions, Iran has still "several billion euros" deposited in accounts in Germany, Italy, Malta, Spain, Greece and Switzerland (2012). As at 2013, only $30 billion to $50 billion of its foreign exchange reserves (i.e. roughly 50% of total) is accessible because of the international sanctions. Iranian media has questioned why assets and foreign reserves weren't repatriated (or converted into gold) while new sanctions were being discussed abroad.
- Transactions: Foreign transactions with Iran amounted to $150 billion between 2000 and 2007 worth of major contracts and both private and government lines of credit. According to the Bank for International Settlements (BIS), the balance of Iran's foreign exchange interactions in foreign banks and financial institutes during Q3 2008 stood above $24.3 billion.

=== US sanctions ===
The US Treasury Department has also stepped up its attempt to restrict financing of foreign investment and trade with Iran. In January 2006, Swiss banks UBS and Credit Suisse announced separately that they were halting operations in Iran. In September 2006 the Treasury Department banned all dealings by Bank Saderat Iran with the US financial system, and in January 2007 it also blacklisted Bank Sepah and its British subsidiary, Bank Sepah International. In October 2007 the US Treasury blacklisted Bank Melli and Bank Mellat.

Under pressure from the US, 12 Chinese banks have reduced ties with Iranian banks since early September 2007, but five of them resumed commercial ties in mid-January 2008. In mid-February 2008, the US Treasury alleged that Iran's Central Bank helped the blacklisted banks evade US sanctions, by conducting transactions for them. In a controversial judgment in 2016, the Supreme Court of the United States ruled that assets allegedly owned by the Bank Markazi could be confiscated to satisfy the damages claimed by over 1,000 victims of terrorist acts sponsored by Iran.

=== Barter trade ===
The Central Bank possesses limited foreign cash reserves due to the international sanctions and problems in the transfer of funds in and out of country. In 2012, The U.S. unilaterally expanded sanctions, which cut off from the US financial system foreign firms that do business with the central bank. Iran is reportedly making increasing use of barter trade, cash smuggling, gold and local currencies of its trading partners to circumvent the international sanctions. The CBI has been blacklisted by the U.S. government due to the bank's involvement in the Iranian nuclear program and it has been blocked from using SWIFT since March 2012 as a consequence.

== Leadership ==
The President of Iran proposes a person as the governor of CBI, who must be verified by the general assembly and appointed by a presidential decree.

== Buildings ==
The CBI was initially located in a modernist building on Ferdowsi Street, by then the financial district of Tehran with the head offices of Bank Melli Iran, Bank Sepah, Bank Rahni Iran, and Bank Bazargani. In 2005, it relocated to the Bank Markazi Tower, a larger and more modern in North Tehran. In the late 2010s, the CBI built a second tower in the same northern neighborhood, known as the Iran Central Bank Museum. Meanwhile, the original building on Ferdowsi Street has been transferred to Bank Melli Iran.

== Publications ==
The Central Bank of Iran publishes a variety of periodicals for general and specialist audiences including Economic Trends, Bulletin, Annual Review, Economic Report and Balance Sheet. Other publications include booklets, monographs and brochures. Many of those documents are also available in English.

== See also ==
- Banking and Insurance in Iran
- Islamic Economics Organization of Iran
- Construction industry of Iran
- Economy of Iran
- History of banking
- Imperial Bank of Persia
- Iranian oil bourse
- Iranian rial (Iran's currency)
- Islamic banking and finance
- List of central banks
- Ministry of Petroleum of Iran
- Monetary and Banking Research Institute
- Shetab Banking System
- Supreme Audit Court of Iran
- Taxation in Iran
- Tehran Stock Exchange
- Bank Shahr
- Cryptocurrency in Iran
- List of financial supervisory authorities by country

== General and cited sources ==
- Basseer, P.; Clawson, P.; Floor, W. (15 December 1988). "Banking". Encyclopædia Iranica. Vol. III/7. pp. 698–709.
- Clawson, Patrick; Rubin, Michael (2005). Eternal Iran : continuity and chaos. Palgrave Macmillan. ISBN 978-1-4039-7710-6.
- Yeganeh, M. (15 December 1988). "Bānk-e Markazī-e ĪRāN". Encyclopædia Iranica. Vol. III/7. pp. 696–698.

Bank of issue of Iran
Preceded by Bank Melli Iran	Central Bank of Iran; 1960–present	Incumbent
