= Kish Stock Exchange =

Kish Stock Exchange is an oil bourse stock exchange launched in late 2010. It is a stock exchange located in the Iranian island of Kish. Kish island is a free trade zone.

In 2013, Kish Stock Exchange announced the transaction of 9 million and 822 thousand shares. According to the Public Relations and International Affairs of the Kish Free Zone Organization, this number of shares was exchanged valued at 27 billion and 288 million Iranian Rials.

== See also ==
- Tehran Stock Exchange
- Iranian Oil Bourse
