= Khorasan Petrochemical Company =

Iranian petrochemical company

- Company type: Public company TSE: KRSN1; ISIN: IRO1KRSN0001
- Industry: Petrochemical
- Founded: 1996
- Founder: National Petrochemical Company
- Headquarters: Bojnord, Iran
- Products: Urea, ammonia, and melamine
- Website: khpc.ir/en/

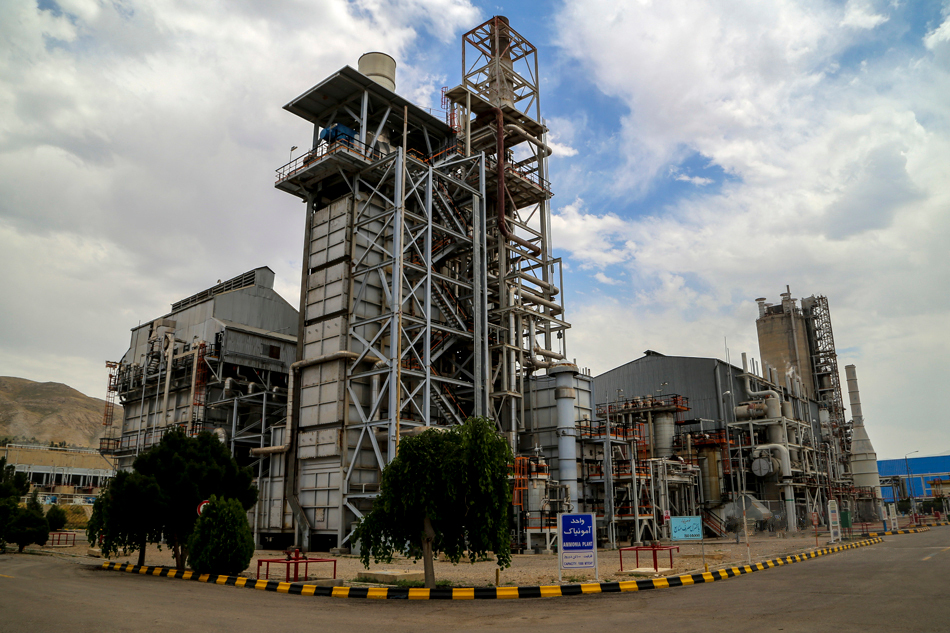
Khorasan Petrochemical Company

Khorasan Petrochemical Company (Persian: شرکت پتروشیمی خراسان) is an Iranian petrochemical company located in Bojnord, the capital of North Khorasan province. It was established in 1990, and its first phase became operational in 1996.

== History ==
Khorasan Petrochemical Company was registered on July 8, 1990, as a private joint-stock company in the Tehran Office of Company Registration and Industrial Property. However, construction activities began in July 1993. On May 6, 2008, Khorasan Petrochemical changed its articles of association to become a public joint-stock company. The company was listed on the second market of Iran Fara Bourse on January 30, 2013, under the symbol "KRSN1," and was transferred to the second market of the Tehran Stock Exchange on February 5, 2019. The company won Iran's National Exemplary Exporter award in 2023. Also, in May 2024, the company received the National Exemplary Industrial Unit award in the presence of Ebrahim Raisi, the former President of Iran.

== Geographical Location ==
Khorasan Petrochemical is located in North Khorasan Province, Bojnord County. The company is situated at kilometer 17 of the Bojnord-Shirvan road in an industrial site. The company's area is 200 hectares, of which 30 hectares are industrial area, 40 hectares are general and non-industrial area, and the remaining 130 hectares are green space and landscape.

== Shareholders ==
The main shareholders of Khorasan Petrochemical are: TAPICO (44%), Petrofarhang (19%), and Parsian Oil and Gas (13%).

== Products ==
Urea, ammonia, and melamine constitute the main products of Khorasan Petrochemical. The feedstock for this petrochemical plant is natural gas.
