= Tabriz Stock Exchange =

- تالار بورس اوراق بهادار تبریز
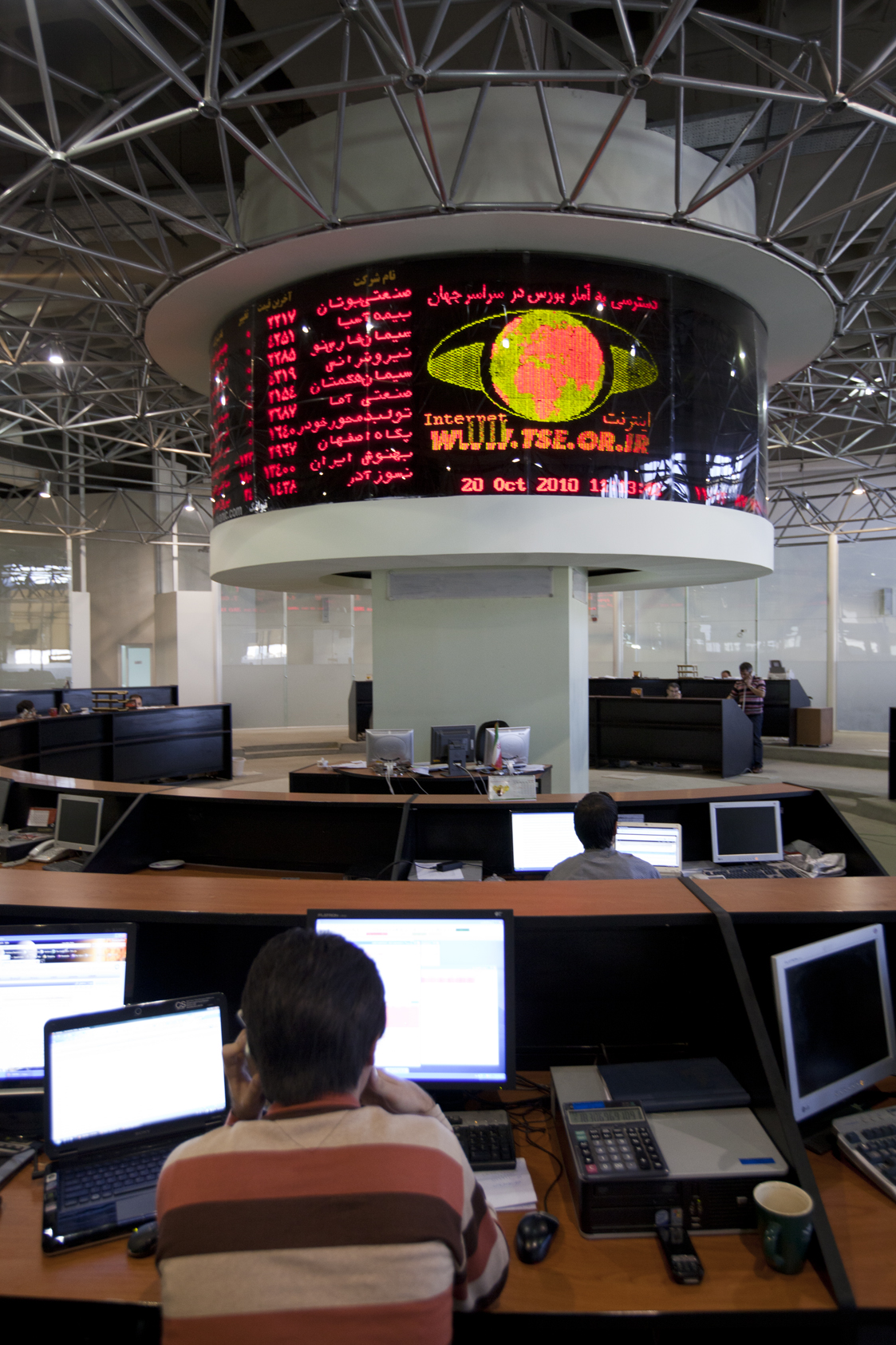
- Type: Stock Exchange
- Location: Tabriz, Iran
- Founded: 2003
- Owner: Public Joint Stock Company
- Key people: Mohammad Amin Abedini
- Currency: Iranian rial
- Commodities: Shares & rights, corporate participation certificates, futures
- No. of listings: 339 companies (May 2012)
- Indices: TEPIX and TEDPIX (main)

Tabriz Stock Exchange (TSE) is the second regional stock exchange forum in Iran which first opened in October 2003 in Tabriz city in East Azerbaijan. Tabriz stock exchange operates under the Tehran Stock Exchange's supervision and all registered companies in Tehran Stock Exchange are dual listed in Tabriz Stock Exchange.

== History ==
Tabriz stock exchange is the second stock exchange forum in Iran. It opened its doors in 2003 and at was first managed by Belal Kheyravar. Tabriz Stock Exchange started its operations with 13 stock brokerages. As of 2014, TSE had 43 brokerages and Mohammad Amin Abedini was its CEO.

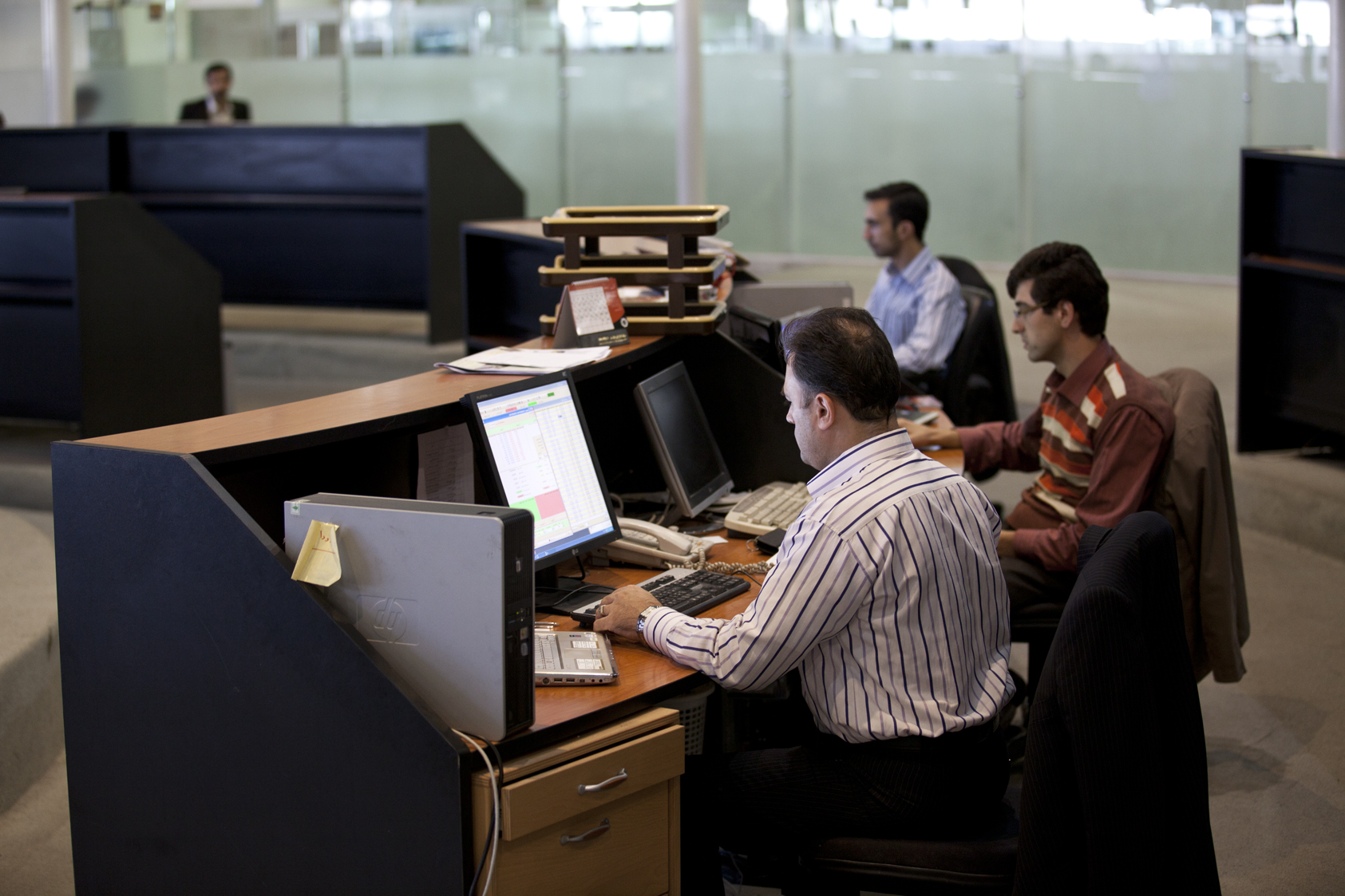
Tabriz Stock Exchange traders

== Tabriz stock exchange performance ==
Tabriz Stock Exchange acts under the direct supervision of Tehran Stock Exchange and all of listed companies in Tehran Stock Exchange are dual listed in Tabriz Stock Exchange.

Tabriz Stock Exchange's trading system is the same as the Tehran Stock Exchange. At first it was the AS/400 trading system, then PAM trading system, and as of 2015, the EBS trading system.

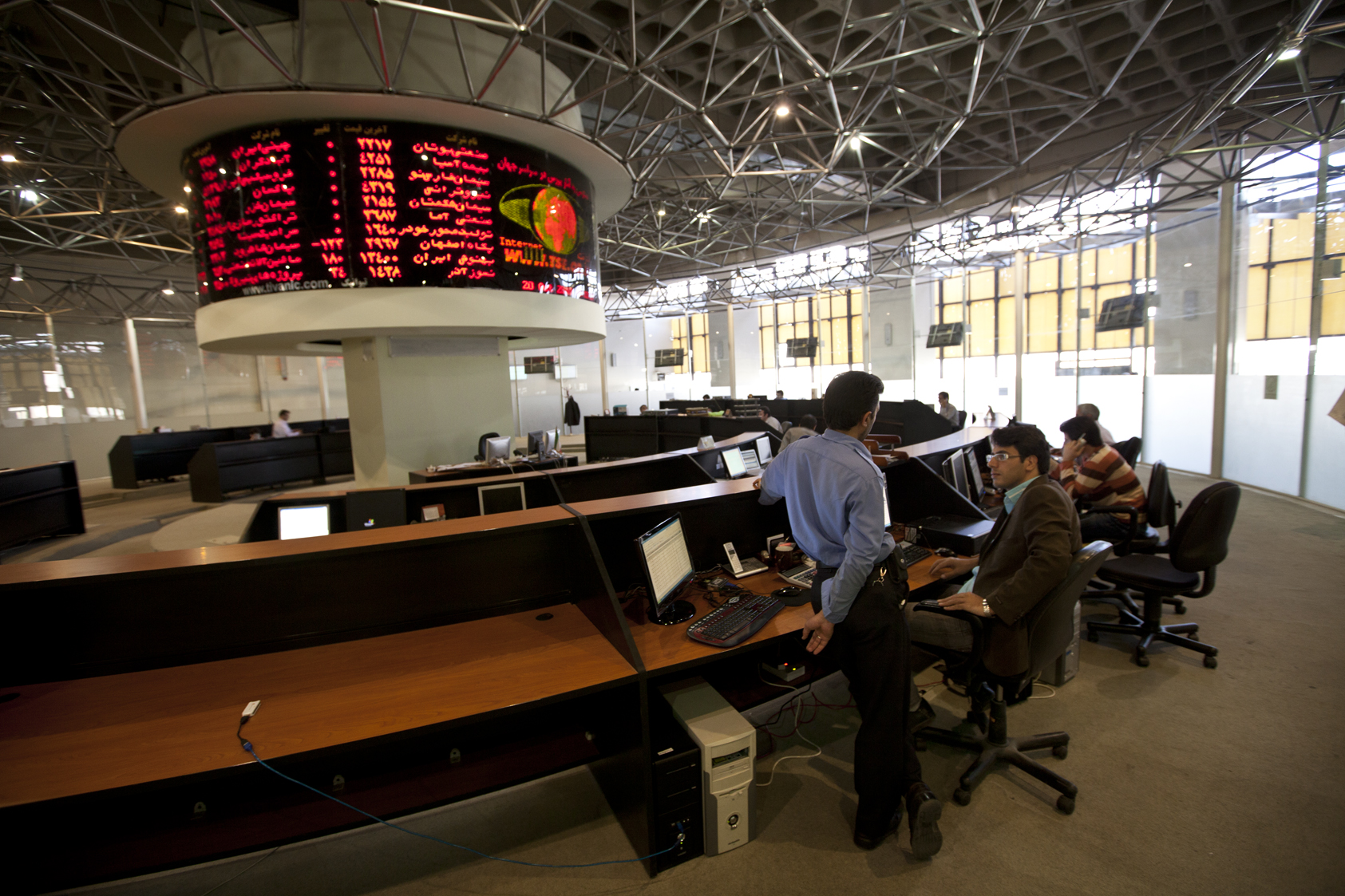
Tabriz Stock Exchange trading hall

== See also ==
- Tehran Stock Exchange
- Banking in Iran
- Economy of Iran
