= Iran Fara Bourse =

- فرابورس ایران; Fer-e Burs-e Iran
- Type: Stock Exchange
- Location: Tehran, Iran
- Founded: 12 November 2008
- Key people: Meysam Fadaee
- Currency: Iranian rial
- Commodities: Shares & rights, corporate participation certificates, futures, exchange-traded funds (ETFs)
- No. of listings: 547 companies (2020)
- Indices: IFX (main)
- Website: ifb.ir

Iran Fara Bourse Co. (IFB), also known as Farabourse, is an exchange for securities and other financial instruments in Tehran, Iran which operates under the official supervision of Securities and Exchange Organization (SEO).

IFB operates as a self-regulatory organization governing the activities of its brokers and members. The company was established on November 12, 2008 and its transactions officially started in four market segments on September 28, 2009. IFB provides a market for both listed and unlisted securities. Currently, there are 5 market segments, including First Market, Second Market, Third Market, Base Market, and Modern Financial Instruments Market. IFB is a member of the Federation of Euro-Asian Stock Exchanges (FEAS) in addition to the Organization of Islamic Cooperation (OIC) Member States' Stock Exchanges Forum.

== See also ==
- Banking in Iran
- Tehran Stock Exchange
- Central Securities Depository of Iran
