= Ghadir International Industries and Mines Development Company =

Mining company of Iran

- Company type: Subsidiary; TSE: TMGD1; ISIN: IRO1TMGD0002
- Industry: Mining
- Founded: 2011
- Founder: Ghadir Investment Company
- Headquarters: Tehran, Iran
- Key people: Seyyed Abutorab Fazel (chairman)
- Products: Minerals
- Website: gimidco.com

Ghadir International Industries and Mines Development Company (Persian: شرکت بین‌المللی توسعهٔ صنایع و معادن غدیر) is an Iranian holding company that operates in the mining investment field. It is a subsidiary of Ghadir Investment Company, which was established in 2011 with registration number 408192 to specialize in investment and economic activity in mining and mining engineering.

== History ==
This company was established in 2011 with a capital of 13,000 billion Iranian rials as a holding company wholly owned by Ghadir Investment Company, with the aim of investing in the mining industry sectors.

== Scope of Activity ==
This company is active in the areas of exploration, extraction, and processing of metallic and non-metallic minerals, non-mining industries, and investment in the chain of mining and metal industries. Most of these holdings' subsidiaries are active in producing electric motors and sponge iron.

== Presence in the stock market ==
Ghadir International Industries and Mines Development Company was accepted as the 597th company on the Tehran Stock Exchange. One billion and 295 million shares, equivalent to 7 percent of this company's shares, were offered on the Tehran Stock Exchange under the symbol "TMGD1".

== See also ==
- Mining in Iran
- Ghadir Investment Company
