= Iranian oil bourse =

Commodity exchange in Kish, Iran

The Iranian Oil Bourse (Persian: بورس نفت ایران; also referred to as the International Oil Bourse, Iran Petroleum Exchange, Kish Exchange or Oil Bourse in Kish or Iran Crude Oil Exchange) is a commodity exchange on the island of Kish, Iran, which opened its first phase on 17 February 2008.

It was created in 2005. The history of Iran Mercantile Exchange and its links with the "international trading floor of crude oil and petrochemical products in the Kish Island" (IOB) have been published.

The IOB is intended as an oil bourse for petroleum, petrochemicals and gas in various currencies other than the United States dollar, primarily the euro and Iranian rial and a basket of other major (non-US) currencies. The geographical location is at the Persian Gulf island of Kish which is designated by Iran as a free trade zone.

During 2007, Iran asked its petroleum customers to pay in non-US dollar currencies. By December 8, 2007, Iran reported to have converted all of its oil export payments to non-dollar currencies. The Kish Bourse was officially opened in a videoconference ceremony on 17 February 2008, despite last minute disruptions to the internet services to the Persian Gulf regions. Currently the Kish Bourse is only trading in oil-derived products, generally those used as feedstock for the plastics and pharmaceutical industries. However, officially published statements by Iranian oil minister Gholam-Hossein Nozari indicate that the second phase, to establish trading in crude oil directly, which has been suggested might one day perhaps create a "Caspian Crude" benchmark price analogous to Brent Crude or WTI will only be started after the Bourse has demonstrated a reasonable period of trouble-free running.

Due to technical problems, the Iranian government finally voted to abandon plans for the bourse on 7 January 2020.

== Background ==
The three current oil markers are all US dollar denominated: West Texas Intermediate crude (WTI), Brent Crude, and Dubai Crude. The two major oil bourses are the New York Mercantile Exchange (NYMEX) in New York City, and the IntercontinentalExchange (ICE) in London and Atlanta. As the Oil Bourse in Kish is developed, the plan is to establish a Petrobourse denominated by the Iranian rial, the euro and other major currencies.

Iran sits on some of the largest oil and gas reserves in the world.

== History ==
=== Development ===
The Iranian oil bourse, first reported in 2005, initially had a widely publicised opening date of 20 March 2006. According to an April 2005 report, the Tehran Stock Exchange (TSE), the Wimpole Consortium and a private staff fund for retired petroleum workers were to form a consortium developing the exchange.

In January 2006, the Wimpole Consortium reported delays in the process following the 2005 presidential election, due to difficulties appointing a new oil minister acceptable to both the parliament and the new president Mahmoud Ahmadinejad. The following month, the consortium complained that their invoices used to receive the trading license has not paid.

In March 2006, Iranian Petroleum Minister Kazem Vaziri Hamaneh announced the postponement of the launch due to "technical glitches", with no new date set, but by 26 April preparations had resumed, and Kazem announced that the bourse was set to open in the first week of May.

Minister of Economic Affairs and Finance Davoud Danesh-Jafari said in May that the Oil Ministry had a two-month deadline for presenting the Articles of Association of the IOB. He said the euro had not yet been finalized as the legal tender of transactions in the oil bourse, and the final decision depended on the Oil Ministry's proposed IOB Articles of Association.

In July 2006 a building was purchased, and the projected opening date was set as September 2006. On 15 September, Minister Kazem stated that all preparatory requirements had been arranged for launching the oil stock market in the country, but the launch still did not occur.

In December 2006, Bloomberg cited two Iranian newspapers reporting Danesh-Ja'fari wanting to cut US dollar based transactions to a minimum. In March 2007, The New York Times reported that China's state-run Zhuhai Zhenrong Trading, the biggest buyer of Iranian crude worldwide, had begun paying for its oil in euros in late 2006. Iranian officials had claimed for months that customers from OPEC members had switched their payment currency away from the dollar as Tehran sought to diversify its reserves, but the news about Zhenrong was the first outside confirmation. Japan also announced that it would be willing to switch to Yen from US Dollars. Iran's central bank announced in March 2007 that Iran had cut its holding of U.S.-dollar assets to around 20% of its foreign reserves in response to U.S. hostility.

In September 2007, Japan's Nippon Oil agreed to buy Iranian oil using yen, and in December, Iran stopped accepting U.S. dollars for oil.

In January 2008, Danesh-Jafari told reporters that the bourse would open on the anniversary of the Islamic Revolution from 1-11 February.

On 4 February, the Iranian cabinet approved the creation of the oil bourse in two stages: first a raw oil exchange, and secondly an oil byproducts exchange. The Ministry of Finance and Economics, the Oil Ministry, the Ministry of Foreign Affairs, and the Central Bank of Iran were required to create a working group to coordinate the project, and the Iran Commodities Bourse Company was tasked with carrying out the project. The communique from the cabinet stated that "the Ministry of Finance and Economics Affairs is required to take measures in making the petrochemical byproducts bourse operational by the end of February 2008."

=== Launch ===
The Iranian Oil Bourse was inaugurated in a video conference ceremony in Tehran on 17 February 2008. The first transaction of the IOB took place at 9:30 the following morning, when 2200 tonnes of low-density polyethylene (LD-PE), held in 100 tonne cases, were traded. It was speculated that the 2008 submarine cable disruption was connected with the launch of the bourse, and that the Iranian internet network was being targeted to stop the launch.

By November 2008, transactions worth over $1.5 billion had been made on different oil and petrochemical products, according to Mehdi Karbasian, the chair of the IOB Board of Directors.

In October 2009, IRNA reported comments from National Petrochemical Company managing director Adel Nejad-Salim that all petrochemical products would be gradually offered on the market. In the first phase, only petrochemical products such as polyethylene and methanol were traded on a spot basis and in Iranian Rial. The Iran Mercantile Exchange reported that the international trading floor of crude oil and petrochemical products was put into operation in November 2009.

In early June 2011, fuel oil transactions were launched at the IOB; payment for 35,000 tons at 621.35 dollar per ton was made through overseas Euro or Dirham accounts. The following month, on 23 July, the third phase of the bourse was launched; a shipment of 600,000 barrels of heavy crude oil were traded at US$112.65 per barrel. On 18 August, a further shipment of 500,000 barrels of heavy crude oil were offered, and traded at US$105.49 per barrel, receiving payments in euro and dirham. The crude consignment was traded without any discount or additional premium.

From 20 March 2012, the Iranian Oil Bourse stopped trading oil in the US dollar, but started trading in other currencies such as the euro, yen, yuan, rupee, or a basket of currencies.

=== Cancellation ===
Due to technical problems, the oil bourse never proceeded, and the plans were finally abandoned after a vote by the Iranian Parliament on 7 January 2020.

== Operations ==
At the time of the Oil Bourse's opening on Kish, the Director of the Kish Stock Exchange, Hossein Allahdadi, said that there "are no limitations imposed on transactions by foreign shareholders at the Oil Bourse in Kish".

As of 2009, the Oil Bourse was a spot market for petrochemical products mainly, with plans to introduce sharia-compliant futures contracts for crude oil and petrochemicals in the future, during the second phase.

Global standards for Islamic derivatives were set in 2010. The “Hedging Master Agreement” provides a structure under which institutions can trade derivatives such as profit-rate and currency swaps.

== See also ==
- Iran Mercantile Exchange
- Petrodollar
- Petrodollar warfare
