= Tehran Stock Exchange Services Company =

Tehran Stock Exchange Services Company (TSESC) (Persian: شرکت خدمات بورس تهران, Shirkat-e Xedâmat-e Burs-e Tehran) is a subsidiary of the Tehran Stock Exchange (TSE). TSESC was established in June 1994 in Tehran as an independent company owned by TSE and its members. The TSESC’s main function is to develop, maintain, operate, and promote systems for all stages of the trade-cycle services in Iran. Specifically, TSESC is responsible to:

- Provide clearance, settlement, and information services for all securities traded in Tehran TSE and other organized markets
- Provide custody and asset services as the Central Securities Depository of Iran
- Maintain all hardware and software used for trade and post trade activities of TSE and other organized markets in Iran
- Develop and enhance existing software applications to address ever changing TSE requirements
- Provide consultancy and technical advice to all stock exchanges or interested organizations for trade and post-trade activities
- Function as the National Numbering Agency of Iran

== History ==
TSESC started its operation as a subsidiary of the National Informatics Corporation (NIC) of Iran in July 1984. Originally, TSESC developed, maintained and operated the computerized system of TSE used for trade and post-trade activities. In June 1994, TSESC was incorporated as an independent company under the ownership of the TSE, its members, and NIC. Currently, TSE and its members are the sole owners of TSESC.

== Structure ==
TSE and its member brokerage companies own TSESC. TSE is the majority shareholder and few brokerage companies own a small percentage of shares at TSESC.

TSESC is administrated by a Board consisting of five Directors: representatives of the TSE and member brokerage companies.
