= Ghadir Investment Company =

- Company type: Public company
- Traded as: TSE: GDIR1; ISIN: IRO1GDIR0000
- Industry: Financial services
- Founded: 1991; 35 years ago
- Headquarters: Tehran, Iran
- Net income: 1,700 billion rials (2009)
- Number of employees: 8,000
- Website: ghadir-grp.ir

Ghadir Investment Company (Persian: سرمایه‌گذاری غدیر, Sarmāye-gozāri-e Ghadir ) was established in 1991 in Iran and entered to the "Tehran Stock Exchange (TSE)" in 1995. Its activities are managing or restructuring Iranian companies on behalf of its share holders. GHADIR is one of the biggest holding investment company in the Tehran Stock Exchange (TSE) with a market capitalization of 97,416 billion Iranian Rials as of 2017.

In 2017, GHADIR had more than 130 subsidiaries, and profits surpassing 12,000 billion rials. These subsidiary companies, in turn, contribute to the development of industry, trade and services in Iran. GHADIR also invests in private equity and venture capital in the Iranian oil & gas & petrochemical sector, as well as power & energy, mines & industries, transportation, cement & construction, and also IT & ICT.

== Ghadir Investment Company Structure ==
Ghadir Investment is a conglomerate company (cluster company) that has been admitted to the Tehran Stock Exchange, and its cluster consists of several holding companies (parent company) which includes the following companies

1. Parsian oil holding
2. Holding the development of Behshahr industries
3. Pars Petrochemical Co.
4. Gemstone Earth
5. Bandar Abbas Refinery
6. Energy Investment and Enri Ghadir
7. Southern Aluminum Industries Complex

=== Shareholders of Ghadir Investment Company ===
Military affiliates own 60 percent of the company's shares. Other shareholders of the company are as follows

Kowsar Insurance Company 4%

Saba Management Development Saba 3%

National Oil Company 2%

Iranian National Investment Company 1%

Eurasia Economic plan Company and Campus Investment Company are also other shareholders.

== See also ==
- Venture capital in Iran
- National Iranian Petrochemical Company
- GIMIDCO
