= Tehran Stock Exchange =

Iranian stock exchange

Tehran Securities Exchange
- بورس اوراق بهادار تهران

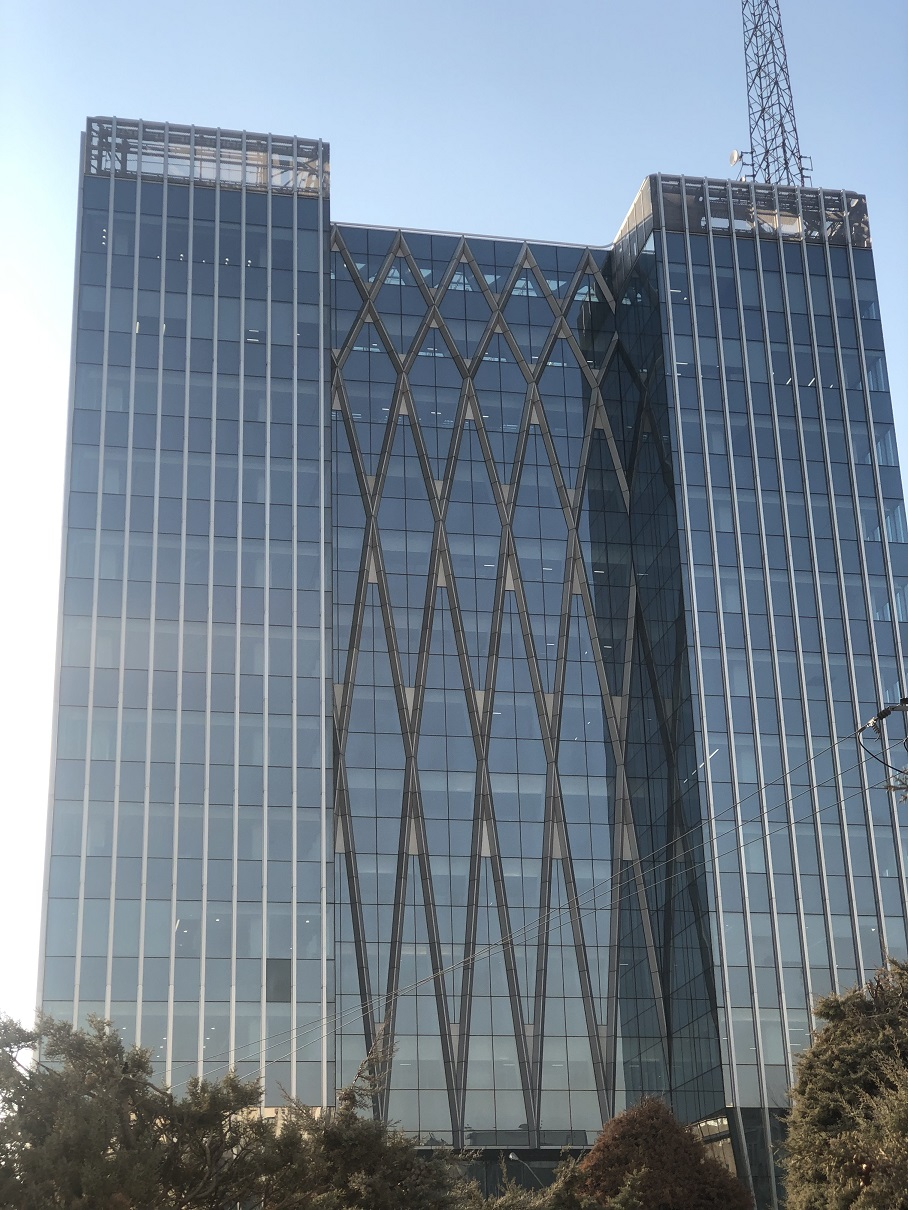
- Type: Stock exchange
- Location: Tehran, Iran
- Coordinates: 35.778°N 51.368°E
- Founded: February 4, 1967
- Owner: Public Joint Stock Company, demutualized (not-listed and for-profit)
- Key people: Mahmoud Goudarzi (CEO)
- Currency: Iranian rial
- Commodities: Shares & rights, corporate participation certificates, futures
- No. of listings: 388 companies (December 2024)
- Market cap: US$2 trillion (December 2024)
- Volume: US$39 billion (December 2024)
- Indices: TEPIX and TEDPIX (main)
- Website: tse.ir
- Note: TSE is self-regulated under SEO supervision. As of July 2010, no margin/lending is offered, except for futures.

The Tehran Stock Exchange (TSE; Persian: بورس اوراق بهادار تهران, romanized: Burs-e Owraq-e Bahadar-e Tehran) is Iran's largest stock exchange, which first opened in 1967. The TSE is based in Tehran. TSE, which is a founding member of the Federation of Euro-Asian Stock Exchanges, has been one of the world's best performing stock exchanges in the years 2002 through 2013. TSE is an emerging or "frontier" market.

Iran's capital market has companies from a wide range of industries, including automotive, telecommunications, agriculture, petrochemical, mining, steel iron, copper, banking and insurance, banking and others. Many of the companies listed are state-owned firms that have been privatized.

In December 2025 study published by Isfahan University Journal of Sociology argued the exchange had gone financially bankrupt with rampant mafia takeover, organizational corruption, with the exchange having turned into an anomie market with insider trading.

== History ==
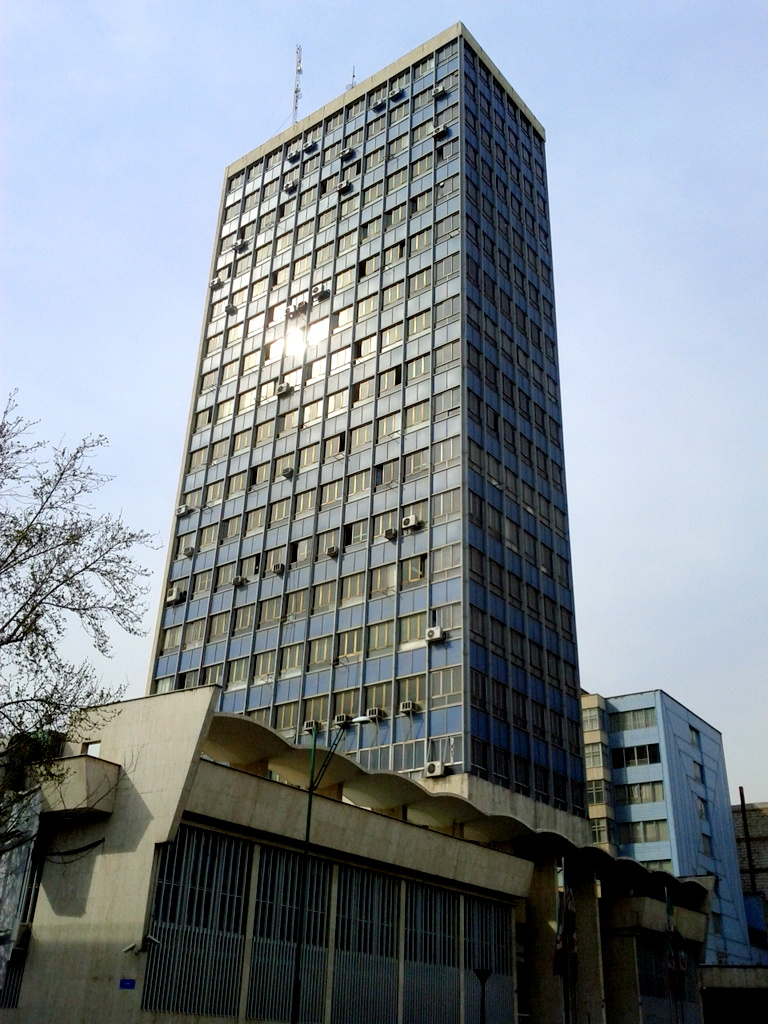
The former building of Tehran Stock Exchange at Hafez St, Tehran, Iran

The concept of stock industrialization dates to 1936, when Bank Melli, together with Belgian experts, issued a report detailing a plan for an operational stock exchange in Iran. However, the plan was not implemented prior to the outbreak of World War II. It did not gain traction until 1967 when the government revisited the issue and ratified the Stock Exchange Act. Initially limited in size and scope, the Tehran Stock Exchange (the "TSE") began operations in 1967, trading only in corporate and government bonds. Iran's rapid economic expansion in the 1970s and a popular desire to participate in the country's economic growth through the financial markets led to a demand for equity. The Government became actively engaged in the process by granting shares to employees of large state-owned and family-owned enterprises. Market activity increased substantially, as both companies and high-net-worth individuals participated in the new-found wealth associated with the TSE.

Everything came to a standstill after the Islamic Revolution leading in a prohibition against interest-based activities and nationalization of major banks and industrial giants. Mobilization of all resources towards the war effort during the 8-year Iran–Iraq War did not help matters. Following the end of the war, the 1988 Budget Act re-established activity on the TSE, and within eight years the exchange saw its numbers rise to 249 companies listed. The Government fully embraced economic reforms and a privatization initiative in 1989 with a surge of activity in share activity of many state-owned companies through the defined targets in the first "Five-Year Economic Reform" where the Government together with the Parliament defined the economic prospects of the country for the coming five years. Attention to promotion of the private sector and new interest in the TSE brought life back to the market. However, lack of regulation and out-of-date legal framework led to crisis in the market leading to certain "meltdowns". Over the 1996 to 2000 period an automated trading system was introduced, and a number of important regulatory mechanisms were strengthened. The market has experienced its share of highs and lows in the past years including topping the World Federation of Exchanges' list in terms of performance in 2004.

Other complementary markets have also been established alongside the equities market. In 2003, the Tehran Metal Exchange (now called the Iran Mercantile Exchange after its merger with the Agricultural Exchange in 2006) was launched. On December 2005, the Securities Market Act of the Islamic Republic of Iran was ratified, marking a significant reform in the country’s capital market through the demutualization of its structure. In alignment with the 2005 reforms, Central Securities Depository of Iran was founded as an independent legal entity, tasked with providing centralized registry, custody, clearing, and settlement services for all financial instruments traded in Iran’s modern capital market. The Oil Bourse and the over-the-counter Farabourse were launched in 2008 followed in 2012 by the Energy/Electricity Bourse and the FOREX bourse.

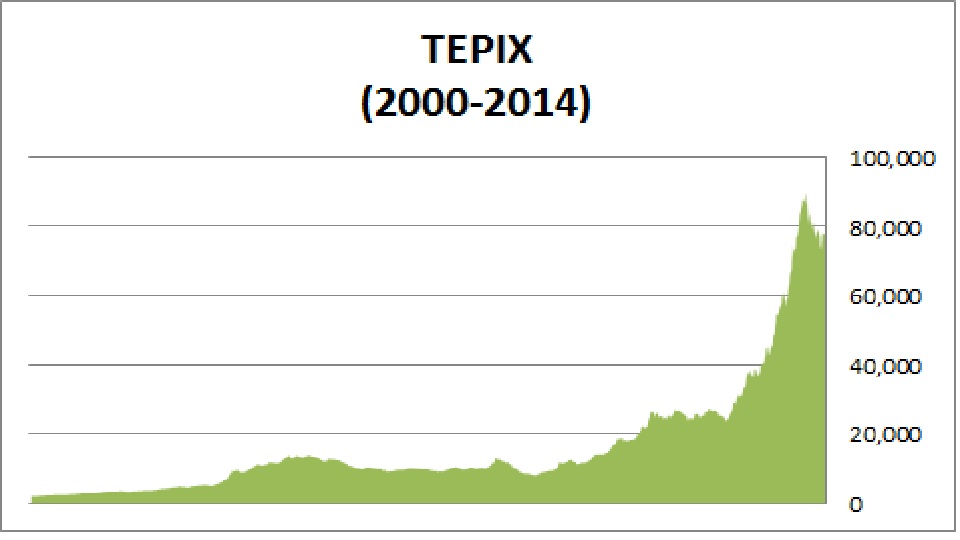
TEPIX: Tehran Stock Exchange's main index (2000–2014).

Main Indicators for TSE^{*}
| | 2006 | 2007 | 2008 | 2009 |
|---|---|---|---|---|
| Number of Listed Companies | 417 | 415 | 346 | 337 |
| Market Capitalization (USD Millions) | 43,794 | 45,574 | 49,040 | 58,698 |
| Total Value of Share Trading (USD Millions) | 6,230 | 7,872 | 15,252 | 16,875 |
| Daily Average Trading Value (USD Millions) | 26.1 | 32.5 | 63.8 | 65.4 |
| Total Number of Trade in Share (Millions) | 15,839 | 23,401 | 37,975 | 82,479 |
| No. of Transactions (in thousands) | 1866 | 2107 | 1978 | 2646 |
| No. of Trading Days | 239 | 242 | 239 | 258 |
| Share Turnover Velocity (%) | 15.6 | 16.37 | 26.5 | 28.74 |
| P/E ratio | 5.4 | 5.2 | 4.1 | 5.5 |
| Dividend yield (%) | 10.44 | 14.5 | 12.3 | 15.8 |
| Market Capitalization/GDP (%) | 17.9 | 15.4 | 14.1 | 15.2 |

*Exchange rate: 1 US $=10,004 IRR (2009)

=== Industry affiliations ===
Since 1995, TSE has been a full member of the World Federation of Exchanges (the former Fédération Internationale des Bourses de Valeurs or FIBV), and is a founding member of Federation of Euro-Asian Stock Exchanges (FEAS). Since July 2010 the TSE is a member of the International Options Market Association.

=== Logo ===
The symbol of the TSE is a highly stylized representation of an Achaemedian dynasty (550-330 BC) gun-metal relief artifact, which was found in Lorestan province. The artifact features four men, hand in hand, indicating unity and cooperation. They are shown standing inside circles of the globe, which is in turn, according to ancient Iranian myth, supported on the backs of two cows, symbols of intelligence and prosperity.

== Structure ==
- The Securities & Exchange Council is the highest authority and is responsible for all related policies, market strategies, and supervision of the market in Iran. The Chairman of the Council will be the Minister of Economics; other members are: Minister of Trades, Governor of the Central Bank of Iran, Managing Director of the Chamber of Commerce, Attorney General, Chairman of the Securities and Exchange Organization, representatives of the active market associations, three financial experts requested by the Economics Minister and approved by the Council of Ministers, and one representative for each commodity exchange.
- The Securities and Exchange Organization (SEO) is responsible for administration and supervisory duties, governed by the Board of Directors. The SEO's Board of Directors are elected by the Securities and Exchange Council. SEO also actively promotes innovation in Islamic products and has formed a specific "Sharia committee" to assess the compatibility of new products with Islamic law. SEO is the sole regulatory entity for the regulation and development of the capital market in Iran.

== Corruption, inside trading, interference and control ==
The Iranian stocks went into free fall in July 2023 and lost more than 2 million units of value. The Iranian Judicial chief demanded questioning from the president and a member of parliament called for firing the stock exchange organization's CEO. Eghtesadnews called it death blow for stock exchange. Etemad wrote the stock exchange lack transparency, government conflict of interest. Supreme Council of stock exchange threatened to leak everything related to corporations even state corporations corruption.

== Operations ==
Under its new structure, TSE has online trading, an arbitration board, digital signature, investor protection, surveillance mechanisms as well as post-trade systems. Pre- and post-trade services for the Tehran Stock Exchange are provided by the Central Securities Depository of Iran (CSDI). The TSE is open for trading five days a week from Saturday to Wednesday, excluding public holidays. Trading takes place through the Automated Trade Execution System from 9am to 12 noon, which is integrated with a clearing, settlement, depository and registry system. Settlement is T+3. The TSE is solely an order-driven market and all transactions are executed in the manner and under the principles of open auction.

=== Trading platform ===
The Tehran Stock Exchange (TSE) has started an ambitious modernization program aimed at increasing market transparency and attracting more domestic and foreign investors. Concrete measures that have been taken in the planning and operations of the stock exchange such as the settlement system, geographical expansion, new exchange laws in order to attract local and foreign capital. The TSE has installed the new trading system which has been purchased from Atos Euronext Market Solutions (AEMS) in 2007.

The new system makes it possible to purchase and sell stocks on the same day. The system has also made it possible for 2,000 brokerage stations to work simultaneously, while the number was just about 480 in the past. The rise in electronic dealing, non-stop input and updated data on orders, transactions and indices are among other features of the new system. The new system has made it possible to link the stock market to the international bourses. The bourse can now handle 700 transactions per second and 150,000 transactions per day.

The trading system is an order driven system, which matches buying and selling orders of the investors. Investors can place their orders with TSE accredited brokers, who enter these orders into the trading system. Then, the system automatically matches buy and sell orders of a particular security based on the price and quantity requirements. The mechanism for which the price of equities is determined is as follows:

- The best price (price priority)
- Time of order priority

Under the price priority rule, a selling (buying) order with the lowest (highest) price takes precedence. Under the time priority rule, an earlier order takes precedence over others at the same price. Thus, when the lowest sell and the highest buy orders match in price, the transaction is executed at the price. In short, the TSE market is a pure order-driven Market.

The trading system also generates and displays details of current and historical trading activity, including prices, volumes traded and outstanding buy and sell orders. This ensures that investors have the required information to be able to take informed investment decisions.

The range of price movements is typically restricted to 3% daily either way from last closing (raised to 5% since May 2015). Restriction on Rights is 6%. This can be changed in specific situation by the Board of the TSE in case of unusual price movements resulting in an extremely high or low P/E ratio. Short selling is not permitted. There are no minimum trading lots. TSE Services Company (TSESC), who is in charge of the site, supplies computer services. TSESC is a member of Association of National Numbering Agencies (ANNA).

=== Market segmentation ===
Besides the Main and Secondary Market, there is a Corporate participation certificates Market (corporate bonds). Secondary Market is an exchange facility where the listed securities of small and mid-size companies can be traded efficiently and competitively. Any company, domestic or foreign, can list their products on the exchange for as long as they meet the listing criteria. The value of three markets of Securities and Stock Exchange, Over-the-Counter (OTC) stock exchange and commodity exchange hit $100 billion in December 2010. In 2010, the Kish Stock Exchange was launched to facilitate foreign investment and monetary activities in Kish Island free trade zone.

Minimum Listing Requirements
| Description | Main Board | Secondary Board | Secondary Market |
|---|---|---|---|
| Minimum Capital (billion IRR) | 200,000 | 100,000 | 30,000 |
| Minimum Shareholders | 1000 | 750 | 250 |
| Free Float (%) | 20 | 10 | 15 |
| Minimum Term of Operation (Years) | 3 | – | – |
| Profitability (Years) | 3 | 2 | 1 |
| Equity to Asset Ratio (%) | 30 | 20 | 15 |
| Market Makers | Selective | Selective | Mandatory |

==== TSE rate ====
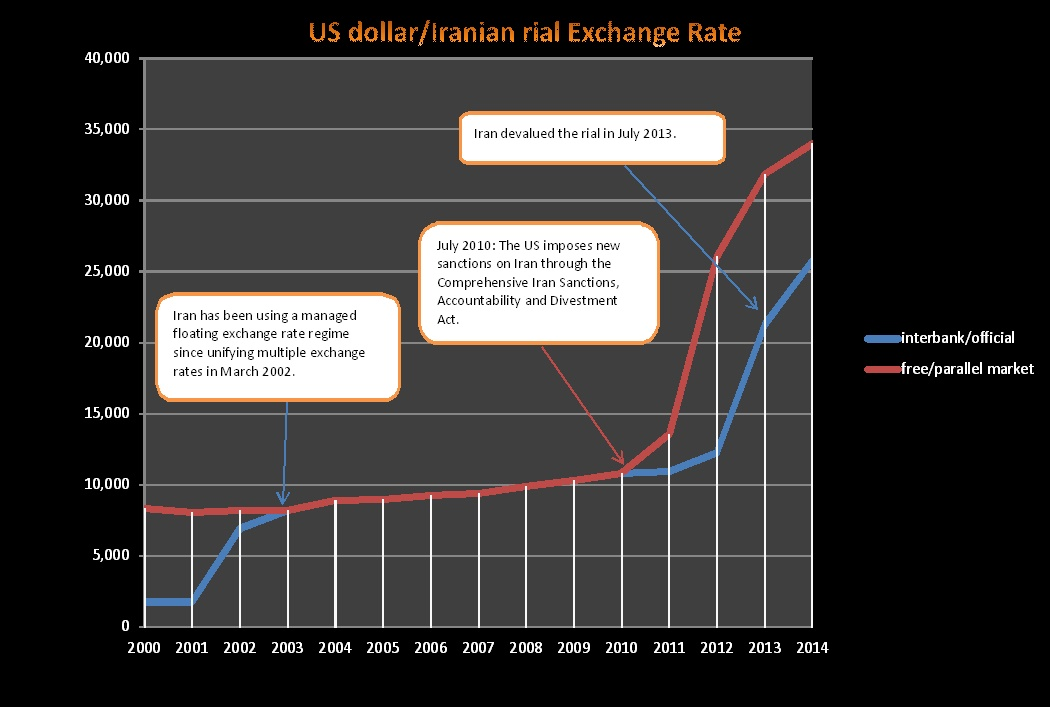
US dollar/Iranian rial exchange rate has remained relatively stable from 2003, when Iran adopted a "managed floating exchange rate" until 2012. Monetary policy is facilitated by a network of 50 Iranian-run forex dealers in Iran, the Middle-East and Europe.

Since 1998, importers and exporters have also been permitted to trade foreign exchange certificates on the TSE, creating a floating value for the rial known as the "TSE rate". In 2002 the "official rate" was abolished, and the TSE rate became the basis for the new unified foreign exchange regime.

=== Brokers ===
Trading takes place through licensed private brokers registered with the Securities and Exchange Organization of Iran. Thirty-one of the 88 brokerages active in the TSE are licensed to trade the futures contracts. The leverage for futures contracts is set at 1-to-10. TSE will only deal in the derivatives through electronic trading. As of 2013, Mofid, Keshavarzi, Agah and Nahayat Negar were the top 4 performers among TSE's brokerage firms. These firms executing 41% of the total value in on-line trading.

=== Electronic trading and market data ===
Starting March 2011, investors are able to trade in the Iranian stock market through the Internet from anywhere in the world, or get all the necessary information before traveling to Iran. There are 87 online service providers which offer round-the-clock information and services about Iran and its stock market. In 2013, 83 brokerage firms (out of TSE's 93 firms) offered on-line transactions, accounting for 18% of the total trading value. In 2014, Iran's TSE was in talks to share its trading data with Thomson Reuters (and Bloomberg L.P. in 2015) once the sanctions are lifted.

=== English-language market data ===
Hormuz Group operates an English-language market intelligence platform covering the Tehran Stock Exchange and Iran’s wider listed-equity market. Its market interface consolidates daily indicators including market capitalization, trading value, liquidity, market breadth, valuation, investor flows, order imbalances and major index movements. Monetary figures are also presented in U.S. dollar terms using a disclosed market USD/IRR reference rate.

The platform also publishes listed-industry data in English, grouping publicly traded companies by industry and comparing their market capitalization, trading activity, returns, valuation and unusual market attention.

=== Trading fees ===
As of July 2010, trading fees include:

- Equities and rights: 0.55% payable by the sellers and 0.5% the buyers.
- Participation bonds: 0.1% of transaction value payable by both the buyer and seller with a maximum of 100 million IRR.

== New products and services ==
Presently, TSE trades mainly in securities offered by listed companies. As of 2015, equities and corporate bonds (e.g. Sukuk) are being traded at TSE. The plan is to introduce other financial instruments in the near future. The introduction of project-based participation certificates that bear a fixed annual return during the period of the project and promise the final settlement of the profit at the date of its completion, has diversified the market. As of 2015, TSE does not offer much complicated Islamic finance instruments such as derivatives (except ETFs and a few put options), nor does it allow short sales or margin trading (except for futures) in contrast to the neighboring Dubai Financial Market.

=== Futures ===
In July 2010, TSE introduced six single-stock futures contracts based on Parsian Bank and Karafarin Bank, which will expire in two, four and six months. Thirty-one of the 88 brokerages active in the TSE are licensed to trade the futures contracts. The leverage for futures contracts is set at 1-to-10. TSE will only deal in the derivatives through electronic trading. In the TSE's derivatives market, over 13,200 single stock futures contracts were traded in 2011 with a value of over 510 billion Rials.

=== Outlook ===
| TSE projects (as of 2009) | Status (as of November 2016) |
|---|---|
| Continuation of privatization plan and IPOs of state-owned companies. | Government's ownership in GDP down to 40% as of 2010 (from 80% in 2005). From 2005 until 2010, Iran privatized $63 billion worth of equity. More information: Privatization in Iran. As of 2015, initial public offerings (IPOs) will be conducted through the process of book-building instead of auction, for more transparency. |
| Increasing liquidity in securities market with a review on trading regulations. | New bylaw to facilitate foreign portfolio investment was ratified by the Council of Ministers in April 2010. Since then, as an incentive to investment in Iran, foreign investors in TSE are tax-exempt. |
| Launching derivatives market and introducing stock futures and options. | In July 2010, TSE introduced six single-stock futures contracts, based on 2 companies which will expire in two, four and six months. Plan to increase coverage to 10 companies by March 2011. Some ETFs are now available at Fara bourse. Futures on indices: originally expected by 2011. TSE embedded a special type of equity put options for two mining companies and a petrochemical company in August 2012 whereas the emitter guarantees a return of 20% (e.g. as a hedge against inflation) for the payment of 1% of the stock value. Gold option trading on the Iran Mercantile Exchange will be available in January 2017. Call options for Mobarakeh Steel Company, National Iranian Copper Industries Company and IKCO were first introduced in 2016. |
| Establishing Islamic bonds and products such as Sukuk and Islamic Mortgage-Backed Securities (MBS), based on market development act and tax exemption. | Sukuk and options are the next instruments to be available. Profit and awards accrued on participation papers are tax exempt. See also: (OTC) Bond market in Iran. |
| Enactment of anti-money laundering laws. | See: Anti-money laundering laws in Iran. |
| Setting up required mechanisms for tracking frauds and claiming against breach of market law. | TSE has an electronic system for tracing market abuse and insider trading. Regulatory framework needs further strengthening and development. See also: Iran Securities and Exchange Commission. |
| Creating efficient corporate governance and investor relations frameworks. | In 2006, the TSE introduced more stringent reporting and disclosure requirements for listed companies and enforcement measures for non-compliance. Six-month corporate earnings announcements are mandatorily audited prior to publishing and seen as being a reliable source of information by investors. Starting April 2014, all companies have to report their short term investments at fair value instead of cost. KPMG and PriceWaterhouseCoopers have suspended their operations in Iran because of international sanctions. Lack of corporate research. First Frontier in London has tied up with an Iranian investment banking firm, the Agah Group, to provide research on the country's leading companies. See also: Accounting standards in Iran |
| Facilitating and expanding market access by means of developing brokerage network, electronic trading and direct market access. | E-trading is possible since July 2010 on trial basis and will be offered to the general public starting March 2011. Mobile Phone-Based Trading planned later in 2011. There are 87 online service providers which offer round-the-clock information and services about Iran and its stock market. Lack of global custodians. See also: Tehran Stock Exchange Services Company (TSESC). |
| Economic Calendar and market data. | Real-time data available: Bid/Ask Prices, Indices, Companies Announcements, Trading Volume and Value through the TSE website and a system named "CODAL", including some corporate reports in English (free of charge). Plans to offer TSE market data through Thomson Reuters and Bloomberg L.P. |
| Promoting the shareholding culture in Iran. | The Government is running financial literacy training programs in the society. See also: "Justice Shares" in Iran. |

== Economic sectors ==
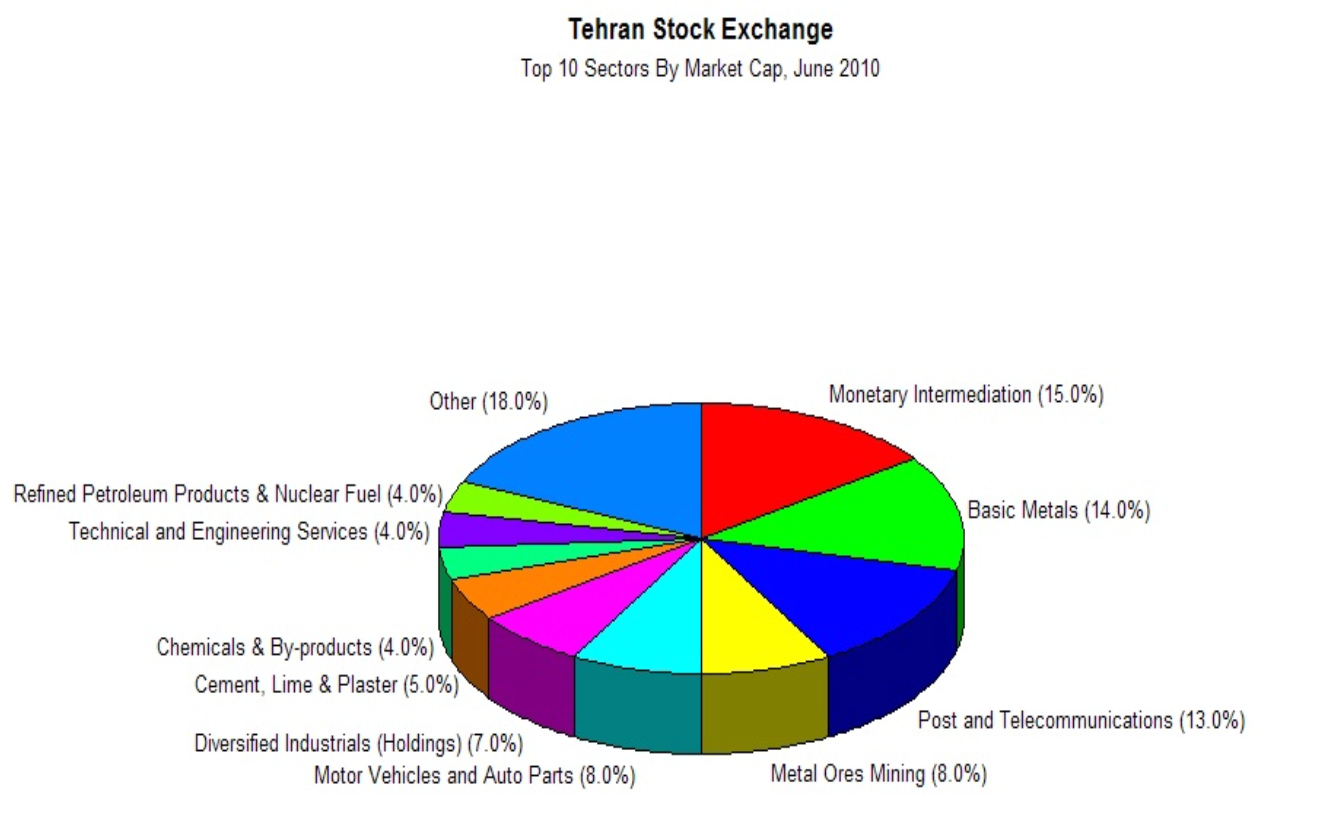
As at 2008, about 30 firms, involved in 11 industries, hold close to 75 percent of shares in TSE. In September 2009, Telecommunication Company of Iran was privatized and became the largest company listed on TSE.

According to the Wall Street Journal in 2015, Iran is "full of well-run companies". Also true, there are companies in Iran which suffer problems such as mismanagement, energy inefficiency, overstaffing, opaque auditing systems, obsolete marketing and distribution networks and high levels of debt.

2007: There were 324 companies listed on the TSE with a total market capitalization (MC) of US$42,452 million. Close to 60% of the MC relates to listed companies from the following sectors:

- Basic Metals,
- Motor Vehicles and Trailers,
- Chemicals and By-Products,
- Non-Metallic Minerals Products.

A total of 161 companies from these sectors are listed on the TSE, which translates to 49.7% of total companies listed. Largest stocks include:

- Mobarakeh Steel Co. with MC of US$3,218 million, which translates to 7.6% of MC,
- National Iranian Copper Industries Company (Persian: Sanaye Mese Iran) at 6.8% of MC,
- SAIPA at 5.3% of MC.

2008: other companies in the top spots included:

- Gol Gohar Iron Ore Company ($2.1 billion MC),
- Chadormalu Mining and Industrial Company ($2 billion),
- Kharg Petrochemical Company (over $1 billion),
- Ghadir petrochemical companies (over $1 billion),
- Khouzestan Steel Company (over $1 billion),
- Power Plant Projects Management Company (MAPNA) (over $1 billion),
- Retirement Investment Firm (over $1 billion),
- Iran Khodro (over $1 billion),
- Metal and Mine Investment Companies (over $1 billion).

This indicates that the capital market in Tehran is heavily concentrated on four economic sectors with companies that make up nearly half of the total listed companies on the exchange. While 163 companies listed are spread out amongst 26 sectors, with the "Food and Beverages Sector" alone accounts to 32 companies at a market capitalization of US$897.5 million. Studies show that in 2008 about 30 firms, involved in 11 industries, hold close to 75% of shares in Tehran Stock Exchange.

2009: A comparison of the top 100 Iranian companies and the Fortune 500 in 2009 indicated that the gross profit margins of the top 100 Iranian companies were almost double those of the Fortune 500. For Fortune 500 companies, the average gross profit margin was 6.9% and for the Iranian companies, it was 13%. The sector with the highest profit margin among the top 100 Iranian companies in 2009 is mining, with a margin of 58%. The mining companies in the Fortune 500 had a gross profit margin of 11%. After mining, other industries with highest margins are base metals, and telecommunications.

2011: The best performing industries in 2011, in terms of total sales, were the banking and automotive sectors. The worst performers were home appliances and electronics. In terms of gross profit margin, mining, telecommunications, and oil and gas exploration & production were the best performing industries. Sales totals of the top 100 Iranian companies on the list ranged from $12.8 billion or the top ranking company, Iran Khodro, to $318 million for the 100th company.

2012: Companies showing the most profit, are mostly in pharmaceutical, petrochemical and steel businesses. The sharp decline of the Rial in 2012 has made exports more competitive. Other favoured companies are state-owned industrial companies that rely on a mostly domestic supply chain, turning locally produced raw materials into products targeting Iranian consumers.

Top 10 Companies by Market Capitalization
| | Name | Market Cap. (May 2012) (million $) | % of total MC (May 2012) | Name | Market Cap. (June 2014) (million $) | % of total MC (June 2014) |
|---|---|---|---|---|---|---|
| 1. | Telecommunication Company of Iran | 9,702 | 9.31 | Khalij Fars Petrochemical Company | 14,434 | 11.00 |
| 2. | National Iranian Copper Industries Company | 6,572 | 6.31 | Mobarakeh Steel Company | 5,576 | 4.25 |
| 3. | Mobarakeh Steel Company | 6,164 | 5.91 | Bandar Abbas Oil Refining Company | 5,227 | 3.98 |
| 4. | Ghadir Investment Company | 3,942 | 3.78 | Tamin Petro | 4,715 | 3.59 |
| 5. | Bank Pasargad | 3,573 | 3.43 | Telecommunication Company of Iran | 4,573 | 3.49 |
| 6. | Gol Gohar Iron Ore Company | 3,194 | 3.06 | Ghadir Investment Company | 4,530 | 3.45 |
| 7. | Khouzestan Steel Company | 3,064 | 2.94 | Iran Mobile Telecommunications | 4,447 | 3.39 |
| 8. | Omid Investment Corporation | 2,908 | 2.79 | Gol Gohar Iron Ore Company | 4,433 | 3.38 |
| 9. | Pardis Petrochemical Company | 2,773 | 2.66 | Esfahan Oil Refining Company | 4,398 | 3.35 |
| 10. | Bank Mellat | 2,737 | 2.63 | Parsian Oil and Gas Development | 4,260 | 3.25 |
| | Total | 44,629 | 42.82 | Total | 56,593 | 43.13 |

2015: Fluctuations in global prices of commodities and the official exchange rate of the Iranian currency have a big impact on the profitability of companies which produce global commodities that are either exported or sold on the free market domestically. More than half the weight of the Iranian stock market cap belongs to such companies.

== Market participants ==
The Government of Iran directly holds 35 percent of the TSE, while securing another 40 percent through pension funds and investment companies such as the Social Security Investment Company, one of the largest institutional investors on the TSE. Bonyads also play a significant role in TSE trading. In 2016, TSE had 38,000 institutional investors.

In 2005 fewer than 5 percent of Iranians owned stock. The Government is promoting the shareholding culture in Iran. By March 2010, 3.219 million shareholders had registered in the TSE, with investment firms having 562,375 shareholders, which makes it the "favorite industry" in the stock market. The number of registered shareholders in the TSE increased to 4.5 million in 2011, 7 million in 2014 and 9 million in 2016.

As of 2014, about 300 foreign investors (including 25 Iranian citizens abroad) comprise 0.5 percent of the TSE. This number increased to 746 in 2016. By comparison, foreigners own 60 percent of Turkish equities. In 2016, there were 127 foreign institutional traders in Iran's equity markets.

=== Funds management ===
As of 2009, 21 mutual funds managed by permitted brokerage firms and investment banks are investing in the TSE according to the investment funds regulation. Mutual funds are open ended and their operation permission is issued by the Iran Securities and Exchange Organization (SEO). Since then, 41 funds have been established, four of which are fixed income funds and the remainder of which are equity funds. As of August 2010, total assets under management within the Iranian fund management industry amount to approximately $230 million with great potential for development. According to The Wall Street Journal in 2015, Western fund managers are already planning financial services companies in Tehran.

== Indices ==
- TSE All-Share Price Index (TEPIX)
- TSE Dividend & Price "total return" Index (TEDPIX)
- TSE All-Share FF adjusted (TEFIX)
- TSE TEFIX-30 - Blue chip index
- TSE Cash Dividend Index (TEDIX)
- TSE-50 - (Top 50 most active companies)
- Each industry (sector) Index
- Industrial Index
- Financial Index
- Each Company Index (based on Price & Volume)

In 1990, the All-Shares Price Index (TEPIX) was introduced to the market as the main indicator of share price movements. TEPIX is a weighted market value of all share prices appearing on the TSE Board and is measured every two minutes. In addition to the TEPIX, daily price indices of shares of each company, each sector, and the "Top Fifty" most active companies (TSE-50) are computed.

Overview of Turnover
| | No. Shares Traded (million) | Daily Average Turnover (million $) |
|---|---|---|
| July-09 | 20,256 | 100.7 |
| Aug-09 | 5,747 | 53.9 |
| Sep-09 | 3,202 | 35.8 |
| Oct-09 | 4,669 | 56.7 |
| Nov-09 | 26,675 | 436.3 |
| Dec-09 | 1,547 | 19.8 |
| Jan-10 | 3,228 | 30.5 |
| Feb-10 | 4,315 | 57.6 |
| Mar-10 | 2,229 | 28.9 |
| Apr-10 | 5,294 | 67.1 |
| May-10 | 21,563 | 125.9 |
| June-10 | 17,837 | 112.7 |
| | 116,562 (total) | 93.83 (average) |

== Performance ==
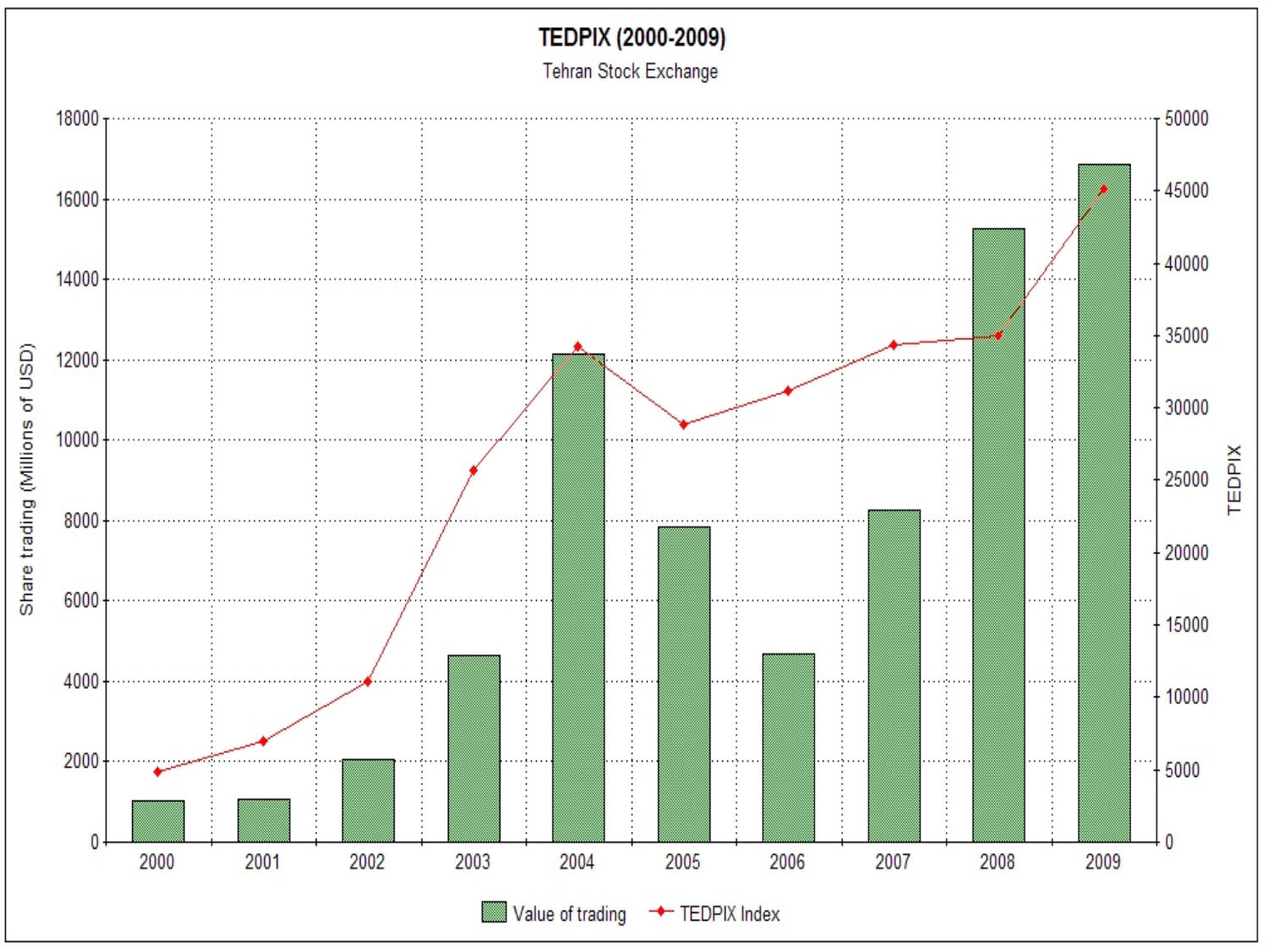
As of December 2010, TSE had a market capitalization of $84 billion. TEDPIX, TSE's Price and Dividend Index, became the world's second-best performing equity index in 2010.

2000–2004: The performance of the TSE has had no correlation with major exchanges or emerging stock markets over the past few years and not even with the oil price. While the overall indices of the world's five major exchanges – New York City, London, Paris, Frankfurt and Tokyo plunged by 40 to 70% between March 2001 and April 2003, the TSE index (Tepix) bucked the trend by going up nearly 80%.

2005–2006: In December, 2005, 419 companies with a market capitalization of IRR 32,741.7 million were listed in TSE. The TSE has had an exceptional performance over the past 5 years. In general, the stock market in 2005/06 shed value as it is manifested by the decline of its major stock price indices. The TSE price index (TSPIX) at the end of 2005/06, declined by 21.9%, while the Financial Sector Index, and the Industrial Index, declined by, 38.8%, 19.4% respectively, and the Dividend Index gained 11.8%, mostly due to a reported US$100 billion capital flight from the country because of the international dispute surrounding the Iranian nuclear programme.

2007: The market bottomed in June 2007 mainly because of the renewed privatization drive in the Iranian economy.

2008: The TSE was not directly affected by the 2008 financial crisis, but following the global reduction in prices of copper and steel, the bourse index dropped by 12.5 percent, as most of the companies listed on the exchange are producers of such commodities. TSE experienced an 11% growth at the end of 2008 and ranked second in the world in terms of increase in the volume of trade after Luxembourg's Bourse.

2009: The TSE sank about 40% in value between August 2008 and March 2009, influenced by falling oil prices and declining markets in other parts of the world. As of August 1, 2009 it has recovered by more than 10%. During Iranian year 2009/10, the value of capital market was around $20 billion. Some 3 million trade exchanges were made, pushing up the index to 12,500 units from the previous 8,000 units.

2010: In the first month of Iranian 2010 (March 20 – April 21, 2010), the index hit the 14,000 unit mark, up from the previous 12,500, showing 12 percent growth. The value of one month's trading transactions exceeded $1 billion against the previous year's corresponding period of $95 million. Tehran Stock Exchange bourse index from June 2009 to 2010 grew 55 percent and the value of TSE's total market capitalization went up about 33 percent, to over $71 billion.

On August 2, 2010, the TSE main index (TEPIX) reached a record level of 16,056 points, despite US-sponsored sanctions against Iran. Thus, TEDPIX became the world's second-best performing equity index. Factors such as the global spike in oil and metal prices, government support for industries and oil sectors as well as the growth of stock market liquidity flow contributed to the boom. Experts commented that the growth was also partly due to a government decision to sell off 20 percent of its equity in two major automakers. Given the relative low market valuation of TSE stocks in 2010, the upward trend was expected to continue over the long run, rather than being a bubble. TEPIX reached a new record on September 18, 2010, when it hit 18,658, up from 11,295 at the start of the year. As of December 2010, the TSE index rose about 64 percent since the start of 2010. The Tehran Stock Exchange has been ranked as the best bourse index in Europe, Africa and Middle East in 2010 in terms of performance of the main index.

2011: On February 1, 2011, TEPIX and total market value reached an all-time high of 21,349 and US$100 billion respectively. An alleged $200 million investments by Iranian expats also contributed to this increase.

On April 9, 2011, TSE's main index (TEPIX) hit a new all-time record high at 26,222 over a boost from the stocks of metal and shipping industries. According to the World Federation of Exchanges (WFE), TSE had the best performance among WFE member exchanges from May 2010 to May 2011. With a staggering 79% growth rate in its main index, the TSE ranked 1st in WFE's "Broad Stock Index Performance" category followed by the Colombo and Lima Stock Exchanges with 75.1% and 48.9% rates respectively.

Overall, Tehran stock exchange posted the second highest gains in global markets in 2011 (TEPIX up 29.6%). Meanwhile, the German's DAX (DAX INDEX) lost 16.5% due and the FTSE 100(UKX INDEX) performed poorly, down 6.7%. Stock markets of emerging economies, like Brazil's Brazil Bovespa Index (IBOV INDEX), shed 18.4%. Equally, MENA stock markets had a poor year in 2011, reflecting both the political turbulence across the region and the battering suffered by most global markets as a result of the Euro area crisis and the increasingly bearish outlook for the global economy.

2012: TSE's overall index hit a new record high in October 2012 surpassing 31,000 points. Export-oriented companies have been favoured because of the imposition of an oil embargo by the international community and the consequent sharp decline in the value of the Iranian rial over 2012.

2013: Following Iranian rial's strong devaluation between 2012 and 2013 and the presidential elections, many Iranian investors started to move their assets from gold into domestic equities. TEPIX hit 68,461 on October 9 (soaring over 50,000 points). TEPIX reached 71,471 on October 14, 2013. Consequently, TSE's main index grew 130% in 2013.

2014: As of September 2014, the TSE trades at price-to-earnings multiple of 6 times, with a 17 percent dividend yield. By comparison, the MSCI Frontier Markets index trades at price-to-earnings multiple of 12.4 times, with a 3.7 percent dividend yield.

2015: The Iranian state is the biggest player in the economy, and the annual budget strongly influences the outlook of local industries and the stock market. The 2015 budget is not expected to bring much growth for many of the domestic industries.

2016: As of June 2016, TSE had an average P/E of 7 against 13.8 for MSCI Emerging Markets. TEDPIX annualized 10-year performance in US$ was 10.1% (against 3.9% for MSCI Emerging Markets for the same period.)

2018: in June 2018, the TEPIX index reached an all-time-high of 102,000. It is expected that listed export-oriented companies (~50% of TSE capitalization) will be advantaged following the steep devaluation of the Iranian rial in 2018.

2019: FY 2019 has been a "golden year" according to financial economists. TEDPIX, one of the 2 main indexes, reached an all-time-high of 512,000 points. According to the same experts, several factors contributed to this, namely better regulation, increased knowledge of the stock market and wider access by the general population and the lackluster status of competing sectors such as gold or real estate.

2026: Iran has faced significant political and economic instability following widespread anti-regime protests, during which officials reported that thousands of demonstrators were killed. In January 2026, the Iranian stock market recorded a historic single-day crash following the announcement that the USS Abraham Lincoln (CVN-72) strike group had been deployed to key assets to the region.

== Growth potential ==
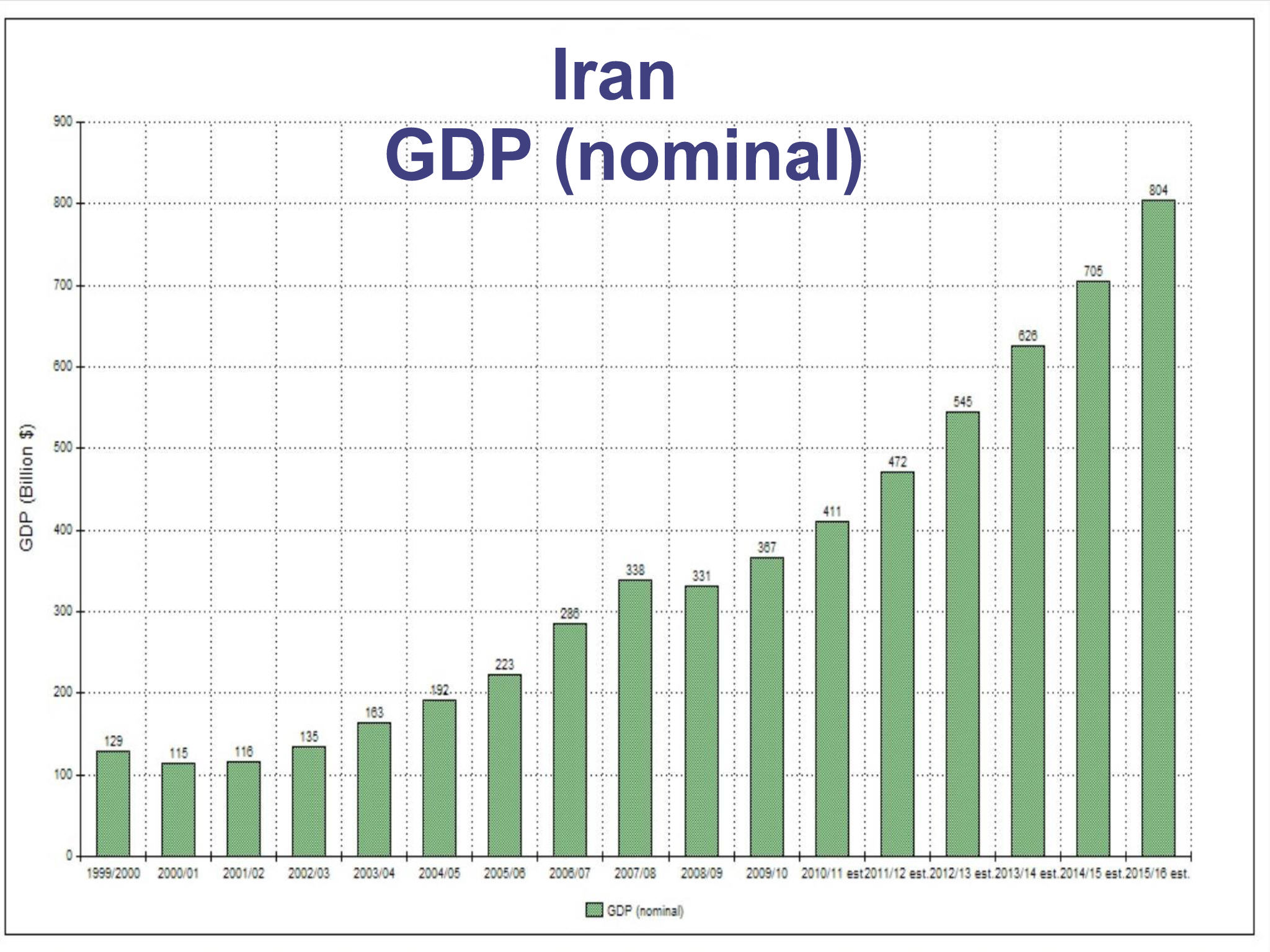
Iran's nominal GDP & projections by the World Bank and the Economist (1999-2015 est.)

Iran is the last, large untapped emerging market in the world. According to many experts, the economy of Iran has many investment opportunities, particularly on its stock exchange. The Central Bank of Iran indicate that 70 percent of the Iranians own homes with huge amounts of idle money entering the housing market. However, if the stock market grows stronger, it will undoubtedly attract idle capital. In terms of investment, the domestic rival markets of the bourse are the Iranian real estate market, cars and gold (with gold being used as a store of value, a hedging tool against hyperinflation and the devaluation of the Rial). According to Goldman Sachs, Iran is forecast to reach the highest economic growth between 2015 and 2025 and join the world's largest economies (world's 12th economy by 2025). Since 2012, TSE has served as a safe haven against international sanctions and inflation.

=== Market valuation ===
In 2007, the market, with a capitalization of $37 billion, was trading at a fraction of the earnings multiples enjoyed by Iran's neighbours, while average earnings continued to grow at about 25 per cent a year. As of 2010, the price-to-earnings rate in Iran's market stands at around six while it is 15 in regional markets. With the removal of obstacles to foreign investment Iran could potentially have a 2,000–3,000 billion US dollar stock exchange market. Due to the price gains the average dividend yield has fallen from 16 per cent in 2009 to 13 per cent in 2010. Iran devalued its currency in July 2013. Iran has a large young, educated labor force. As of 2014, Iran's wage costs are lower than Vietnam’s (i.e. cheap).

According to Voltan Capital Management LLC (New York City), growth valuations and potential investment upside are similar to frontier markets in their early stage while it has developed characteristics such as well-educated workforce, a large middle-class and a broad industrial base. According to various sources, TSE is 200% undervalued in comparison to frontier market peers because of misperception and sanctions (2015).

=== Privatization ===
In recent years, the role of the private sector has been further on the increase. Furthermore, an amendment of the article 44 of the Iranian Constitution in 2004 has allowed 80% of state assets to be privatized, 40% of which will be conducted through the "Justice Shares" scheme and the rest through the Bourse Organization. The government will keep the title of the remaining 20%.

Under the privatization plan, 47 oil and gas companies (including PetroIran and North Drilling Company) worth an estimated $90 billion are to be privatized on the Tehran Stock Exchange by 2014.

Foreign investors can bid in Iranian privatization tenders, but need permission from the Economy Ministry on a case-by-case basis. The government has reduced the bureaucratic channels and issues investment permits for foreign nationals in less than seven days. Iran has announced it will begin to allow foreign firms to purchase Iranian state-run companies, with the possibility of obtaining full ownership.

=== Iranian expatriates ===
There are differing estimates of the total capital held by Iranian expatriates. One estimate places the number at $1.3 trillion US dollars. Whatever the actual number, it is clear that these funds are sufficiently large enough to buy significant stakes in all state companies. In Dubai alone, Iranian expatriates are estimated to have invested up to $200 billion. Even a 10 percent repatriation of capital would have a significant impact. In 2000, the Iran Press Service reported that Iranian expatriates had invested between $200 and $400 billion in the United States, Europe, and China, but almost nothing in Iran. FIPPA provisions apply to all foreign investors, and many Iranian expatriates based in the US continue to make substantial investments in Iran.

=== Foreign portfolio investment ===
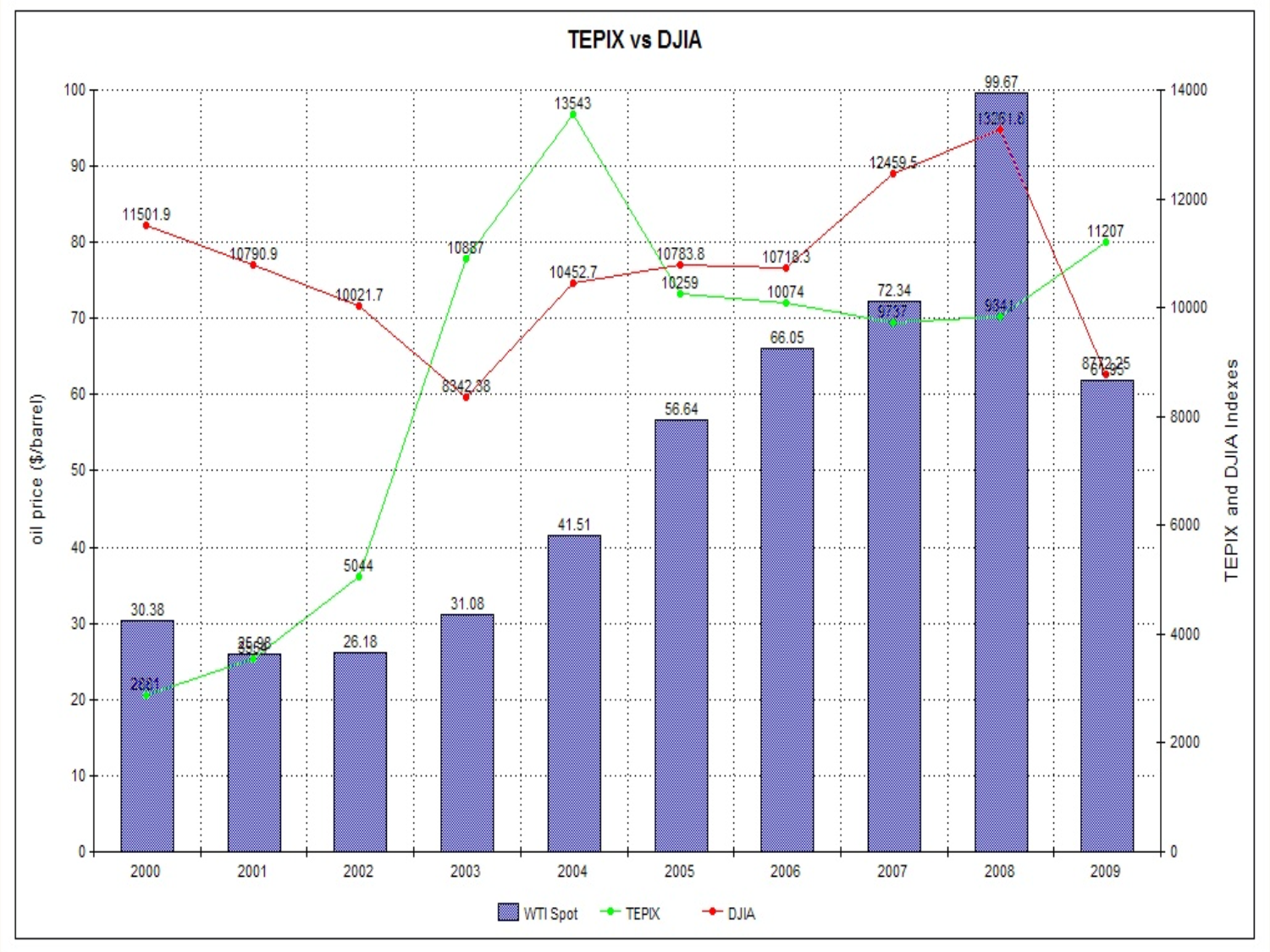
The performance of the TSE has had no correlation with major exchanges or emerging stock markets over the past few years and not even with the oil price.

So far, the Tedpix index has been driven by domestic investors, including wealthy Iranians, public sector pension funds and the investment arms of state-owned banks. For the index to prosper in the long run, more foreign investors need to make significant share purchases. As at 2009, foreign portfolio investment accounts for only about 2 percent of the stock market in Iran. Foreign investors find it difficult to invest directly or indirectly, since banks cannot transfer funds, and there are no custodian banks because of sanctions. On 10 November 2018 Gottfried Leibbrandt, chief executive of SWIFT said in Belgium that some banks in Iran would be disconnected from this financial messaging service.

The new by-law on foreign portfolio investment was approved by the government in June 2005, but ratified by the Council of Ministers in April, 2010. Under this new bylaw, foreign investors can participate in the TSE for the first time. Initially, however, some limitations had been imposed on foreign investors:

- Foreign investors may own a maximum of 10 percent of each listed company.
- Foreign investors may not withdraw their main capital and capital gain for the first three years of their investment. Repatriation is possible, after one year under the current regulations.

With the new law, Iran has increased the ceiling on foreign participation to 20% and foreign investors can now invest in the capital market, trade shares (including OTC) and:

1. For small-scale (foreign) investors, take out their money at any time;
2. For large-scale investors which possess 10 percent of the agency's value or 10 percent of the management position, can take their capital out of the country after two years upon receiving permission from the government.
3. This new law does not explicitly protect against control and manipulation through foreign pool of money (e.g. through funds located offshore or foreign agents based in Iran.)

==== FOREX ====
Since April 2010, foreign investors have been able to open foreign-currency accounts at Iranian banks and exchange their currencies to rials and vice versa. Foreigners who want to trade in Iran must get a license, which the exchange says will take seven days on its website.

==== Non-commercial risks ====
The Central Bank of Iran is also in charge of providing the investors with the necessary foreign exchange, which is also transferable. Moreover, under the law, foreign investors are protected and insured against possible losses and damages caused by future political turmoil or regional conflicts.

==== Dual listing ====
Iran is to target foreign investment in its energy sector by creating an umbrella group of nearly 50 state-run firms and listing its shares on four international stock exchanges.

==== Offshore funds ====
As of 2014, Turquoise Partners in Tehran (and Confido Capital OY in Helsinki) are some of the few opportunities for foreign investors to participate on the Tehran Stock Exchange. Turquoise Partners publishes one of the few English newsletters that covers developments of the Tehran Stock Exchange and the Iranian economy called "Iran Investment Monthly". In 2014, Mehrafarin Brokerage Company became the first broker to open an office in London. ACL Ltd in London says it plans to launch a fund focused on Iran worth over $100 million, if sanctions are lifted. Hundreds of Western hedge fund managers and investors have visited Iran in 2015, in anticipation of the lifting of sanctions. Renaissance Capital and London-based Sturgeon Capital have also shown interest in investing in the TSE.

==== U.S. sanctions ====
U.S. persons need a license from the U.S. Treasury Department's Office of Foreign Assets Control (OFAC) in order to invest in the TSE. Analysts expect TSE to be among the biggest early beneficiaries if the sanctions are lifted.

== Taxes ==
As of July 2010, taxes on TSE transactions are as follows:

- Cash dividend: No tax (22.5% at source from Company).
- Share transfers: The Tax Amendment has changed the regulations regarding calculation of tax on transfer of shares and their rights in Iranian corporate entities.
  - In the case of shares listed on the Tehran Stock Exchange (TSE) the tax on transfer of such shares and other rights is 0.5 per cent of the sales price.
  - In the case of transfer of the shares and their rights to other corporate entities (i.e. those not listed on the TSE) a flat rate of four per cent of value of the shares and rights transferred applies. No other taxes will be charged. The Amendment has removed the requirement to value the shares in this category.

=== Exemptions ===
- Capital gain: No tax.
- Interest income: No tax.
- Participation papers: Profit and awards accrued are tax exempt.
- Listed companies: 10% tax exemption, companies holding 20% free float shares are provided 20% tax exemption.

== See also ==
- International Rankings of Iran in Economy
- List of banks in Iran
- Tabriz Stock Exchange
- List of Mideast stock exchanges
