= Central Securities Depository of Iran =

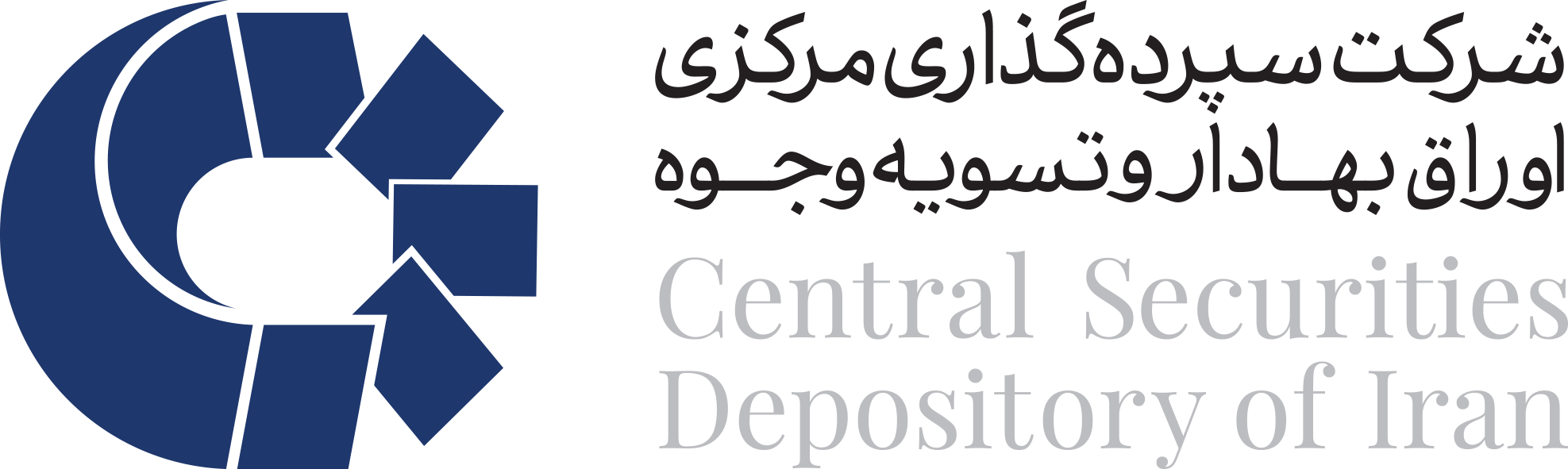
- Company type: Public Joint Stock Company
- Traded as: IFB: CSDI1
- ISIN: IROTCSDI0001
- Industry: Finance
- Predecessor: Tehran Stock Exchange Brokers Association
- Founded: December 25, Dec
- Headquarters: No. 68, East Sarv Blvd., Sa'adat Abad District, Tehran –Iran
- Number of locations: 3
- Key people: Chairman of the Board (Mr.Bagher Taheriyanfar), Executive Chairman (Mr. Mohammad Baghestani)
- Products: Central Securities Depository, Clearinghouse, Delivery agent / for Iranian Commodity Exchanges: Account Management and Safekeeping, Registry, Clearing and Settlement, Corporate Actions and Governance Services, Repository and Reporting, e-KYC, Tax administration
- Brands: Sejam, DDN, Justice shares System
- Revenue: 9,055,206 Million IRR (April 2024)
- Net income: 3,797,121 Million IRR (April 2024)
- Total assets: 36,703,479 Million IRR (April 2024)
- Total equity: 18,716,501 Million IRR (April 2024)
- Owner: The shares of CSDI mostly belongs to the Iran's capital market entities, Commercial banks, investment groups, financial groups, brokers and pension funds.
- Members: Brokers, Fund (108 Members)
- Number of employees: 248
- Divisions: Board of Directors, CEO's Office, Chief Financial & Administrative Officer: (Administration & Human Resource Director, Financial Affairs Director), Chief Technology Officer: (Network & Infrastructure Director, Information Systems Director, Settlement & Payment Platform Director), Chief Operating Officer: (Shareholders Operations Director, Issuers Affairs Director, Equity Market Settlement Director, Commodity Market Settlement Director, Head of Dividend Distribution Section), Chief Legal Officer: (Legal Services Director, Legal Operations Director), Internal Audit Director, Public Relations Director, Security Director, International Relations Director, Information Security Director, Planning & Development Director, AML.CFT Director.
- Subsidiaries: Samat Samaneh / Capital Market Central Asset Management Company
- Website: https://en.csdiran.ir

The Central Securities Depository of Iran (CSDI) (Persian: سپرده‌گذاری مرکزی اوراق بهادار و تسویه وجوه, romanized: Sepordeh Gozari Markazi Oragh-e Bahadar va Tasvieh Vojouh) serves as the central registrar, depository, and clearinghouse for financial instruments traded on Iran’s capital market, as well as for physical market transactions in the Iran Energy Exchange. CSDI operates as an independent, self-regulatory organization (SRO) and provides pre-trade and post-trade services for Iran’s exchanges, including the Tehran Securities Exchange (TSE), Iran FaraBourse (IFB), Iran Energy Exchange (IRENEX), and Iran Mercantile Exchange (IME).

== History and background ==
In December 2005, the Securities Market Act of the Islamic Republic of Iran was ratified, reforming the country’s capital market through the demutualization of its structure. As part of this transformation, the Tehran Stock Exchange Brokers Association, originally established in 1967, was dissolved, and its regulatory and supervisory responsibilities were transferred to the newly formed Securities and Exchange Organization (SEO). While CSDI was officially established in 2005, its institutional roots date back to 1967, when the Brokers Association contributed to the early post-trade infrastructure of Iran’s capital market. In alignment with the 2005 reforms, CSDI was founded as an independent legal entity, tasked with providing centralized registry, custody, clearing, and settlement services for all financial instruments traded in Iran’s capital market.

== Establishment and Regulatory Framework ==
CSDI was officially established in 2005 as a public joint-stock company, following the enactment of the Securities Market Act of the Islamic Republic of Iran. This law, known as the SMA (2005), introduced a comprehensive regulatory framework aimed at reforming and modernizing Iran’s capital market by transitioning from a self-regulatory model to a centralized supervisory structure under the oversight of the Securities and Exchange Organization (SEO).

Within this framework, CSDI was designated as the central securities depository, responsible for delivering pre-trade and post-trade services, including:

- Securities registration and dematerialization
- Custody and safekeeping
- Clearing and settlement of trades
- Ownership bookkeeping and corporate action services

CSDI operates under the supervision of the SEO and the Securities and Exchange High Council, functioning as a self-regulatory organization (SRO) within the scope of its mandate. The legal and regulatory oversight of CSDI is based on:

- The Securities Market Act (2005)
- Decisions of the High Council of Securities and Exchange
- Internal rules and bylaws of CSDI

As the infrastructure provider for Iran’s capital market, CSDI supports trading operations across all licensed exchanges, including:

- Tehran Stock Exchange (TSE)
- Iran Fara Bourse (IFB)
- Iran Mercantile Exchange (IME)
- Iran Energy Exchange (IRENEX)

CSDI aligns its operations with international standards, notably the Principles for Financial Market Infrastructures (PFMIs) issued by CPMI-IOSCO, particularly in the areas of risk management, settlement finality, and transparency, to ensure market integrity and investor protection.

== Shareholders and Market Participants ==
CSDI’s main shareholders include the Securities and Exchange Organization of Iran (holding preferred shares), along with a combination of commercial banks, investment institutions, financial groups, brokerage firms, and pension funds.

The depository provides services to a wide range of market participants, including:

- Retail and institutional investors
- Issuers of securities
- Mutual funds and investment banks
- Asset management companies
- Financial data processing and back-office service providers
- Regulatory and supervisory authorities

== Services ==
CSDI provides services covering pre-trade and post-trade activities within the Iranian capital market. Its core functions include registry, clearing, and settlement of tradable financial instruments.

Beyond its depository role, CSDI delivers a range of back-office and value-added services, including:

- Electronic Know Your Customer (e-KYC)
- Risk management solutions, such as credit limit monitoring and the Settlement Guarantee Fund (SGF)
- Corporate action services, including dividend distribution, rights administration, and capital increase facilitation

CSDI also supports e-services tailored to various stakeholders—investors, issuers, brokers, and government service offices—covering:

- Pledging and collateral management
- Legal transfer of securities
- Data reporting to domestic and international institutions
- Post-trade support services for commodity exchanges such as IRENEX and IME

Other services offered by CSDI include:

- Trade repository services
- Information and market data services
- Technological solutions for post-trade infrastructure
- Triparty collateral management services
- An e-voting platform for shareholders’ meetings
- A funds order routing platform to facilitate mutual fund transactions

== Systems ==
Comprehensive Information Gathering System (CIGS) CIGS serves as the infrastructure platform for electronic Know Your Customer (e-KYC) and identity verification of individuals and institutions entering the Iranian capital market. Through this system, market participants register their information once on the CIGS platform and can then access capital market services based on the verified information stored in the system. The CIGS database maintains identity details, such as personal identification, banking information, and contact data, enabling a standardized onboarding process across the market ecosystem.

Integrated Portal for Capital Market Stakeholders (Dara) Dara has been developed by CSDI to provide electronic services for Iranian capital market participants, including investors, issuers, and market regulatory bodies, in a single platform. The platform provides access to information and operational services for investors already registered in CIGS. Since 2019, CSDI’s electronic services have become available for all Iranian market players through the DDN portal.

Integrated Portal of Electronic General Meetings (DIMA) DIMA is an electronic service platform that enables remote access to the general meetings (GMs) of publicly listed companies and other entities registered with the SEO. DIMA provides shareholders and stakeholders with a digital environment to participate in meetings, vote, and stay informed, regardless of their physical location. The platform was launched in 2020 as part of Iran’s digital transformation initiative in the capital market.

SETAREH The first phase of the Electronic Securities Collateralization System, known as Setareh, was unveiled on July 27, 2022. Setareh allows commercial banks to accelerate the loan disbursement process for securities holders by leveraging an online service platform. This system streamlines credit services in Iran’s capital market by enabling the use of dematerialized securities as collateral in an electronic environment.

Brokers Electronic Portal (KARA) KARA is an electronic platform launched in early 2017 to streamline and centralize services provided to brokerage firms. The system was developed to offer services in a digital environment, reduce paper-based correspondence, and enhance the efficiency of communication between brokerage firms and CSDI. In 2024, the platform evolved into KARA 2, with new features, technical enhancements, and a modernized user interface.

== Leadership ==
The Central Securities Depository of Iran (CSDI) has been led by the following CEOs who also served as board members:

- Mohammad Baghestani, CSDI CEO & Board member, 2021–Present.
- Hossein Fahimi, CSDI CEO & Board member, 2017–2021.
- Mohammadreza Mohseni, CSDI CEO & Board member, 2015–2017.
- Hamed Soltaninejad, CSDI CEO & Board member, 2011–2015.
- Alireza Haji Norouzi, CSDI CEO & Board member, 2005–2011.

== International Presence ==
The Central Securities Depository of Iran (CSDI) is a member of six international organizations, through which it actively engages with the global financial infrastructure community, contributing to knowledge sharing, regulatory harmonization, and the development of industry standards.

World Forum of CSDs (WFC) The World Forum of CSDs (WFC) is composed of five regional associations of central securities depositories: the Asia-Pacific CSD Group (ACG), the Americas’ Central Securities Depositories Association (ACSDA), the Association of Eurasian Central Securities Depositories (AECSD), the Africa & Middle East Depositories Association (AMEDA), and the European Central Securities Depositories Association (ECSDA). CSDI became a member of WFC in September 2012 through its affiliation with ACG. The forum serves as a platform for CSDs to exchange insights and coordinate cross-regional and global developments. In 2019, Hossein Fahimi, then CEO of CSDI, was appointed as a WFC board member representing ACG. He was later succeeded by the current CEO, Mohammad Baghestani.

Asia-Pacific CSD Group (ACG) The Asia-Pacific CSD Group (ACG), established in 1997, is a regional network that promotes information exchange and cooperation among depositories and clearing organizations in the Asia-Pacific region. CSDI joined ACG in 2012 during the 16th ACG General Assembly in Bali, Indonesia. It has since been elected to ACG’s Executive Committee for three consecutive terms and has twice served as Vice-Chair, representing ACG on the WFC board.

Association of Eurasian Central Securities Depositories (AECSD) Formed in 2004, AECSD is a regional association that fosters cooperation among CSDs in Eurasia and facilitates the creation of cross-border settlement frameworks. CSDI formally became a member of AECSD in 2023, following active participation in its conferences and activities since 2021.

Federation of Euro-Asian Capital Markets (FEAS) Established in 1995, the Federation of Euro-Asian Capital Markets (formerly the Federation of Euro-Asian Stock Exchanges) fosters collaboration and knowledge-sharing among capital market institutions across Europe, Asia, and the Mediterranean. CSDI joined FEAS in 2006 and has held board positions, participated in the audit committee, and chaired the CSD, Pre-trade, and Post-trade Working Group. In 2025, during its 40th General Assembly in Almaty, the organization adopted its new name to reflect its broader mission.

OIC Member States' Stock Exchanges Forum (OICEF) Founded in 2005 under the Organization of Islamic Cooperation (OIC), the OIC Exchanges Forum aims to strengthen ties among stock exchanges and capital market institutions of OIC member states. CSDI has been a member since 2008 and has contributed to collaborative initiatives in post-trade services and capital market development.

Asia Fund Standardization Forum (AFSF) The Asia Fund Standardization Forum (AFSF) was established in 2015 as a platform for promoting operational standardization of post-trade processes for cross-border fund transactions across Asia. The initiative was introduced by the Korea Securities Depository (KSD) and formalized during the 19th ACG General Meeting in Taipei.

== Memorandum of Understanding ==
The Central Securities Depository of Iran (CSDI) has established cooperation agreements with 16 international counterpart institutions across the globe, promoting bilateral partnerships and enhancing collaboration in post-trade and capital market operations. The main agreements include:

- Central Bank of Yemen (2022)
- National Settlement Depository (NSD), Russia (2018)
- Swiss-Iranian Investment Forum (SIIF) (2018)
- Hellenic Central Securities Depository (ATHEXCSD), Greece (2016)
- Taiwan Depository & Clearing Corporation (TDCC) ، Taiwan (2016)
- Japan Securities Depository Center, Inc. (JASDEC), Japan (2016)
- National Securities Depository Limited (NSDL), India (2015)
- Muscat Clearing & Depository (MCD), Oman (2014)
- National Clearing Company of Pakistan Limited (NCCPL), Pakistan (2014)
- China Securities Depository and Clearing Corporation (CSDC), China (2014)
- Central Depository Company of Pakistan Limited (CDCPL), Pakistan (2013)
- Indonesia Clearing and Guarantee Corporation (KPEI), Indonesia (2013)
- Indonesia Central Securities Depository (KSEI), Indonesia (2013)
- Korea Securities Depository (KSD) (2013)
- Central Registry and Securities Depository of Türkiye (MKK), Turkey (2010)
- Takasbank of Turkey, Turkey (2008)
- *

== Associate & Subsidiaries ==
1. Capital Market Central Asset Management Company (CMCAMC) Established in August 2010 by a resolution of the High Council of Securities and Exchange, the Capital Market Central Asset Management Company (CMCAMC) plays a central role in Iran's capital market as a trustee and issuer of Islamic securities (Sukuk). Its responsibilities include the establishment and management of intermediary financial entities, oversight of fund utilization, account administration, financial reporting, and the ongoing supervision of Special Purpose Vehicles (SPVs).

SPVs are dedicated institutions established by CMCAMC for the issuance of Sukuk and are the sole authorized entities for such issuances in Iran’s capital market. These entities typically have an initial capital of 100 million rials, with 99% of shares held by CMCAMC. Their main role is to fund projects under Islamic financial contracts and manage the proceeds raised through securities issuance. The company's revenue is primarily generated from fees determined by the Securities and Exchange Organization (SEO) and the Central Securities Depository of Iran (CSDI).

Shareholding structure:

- Central Securities Depository of Iran: 49%
- Iran Fara Bourse: 29%
- Tehran Stock Exchange: 20%
- SEO Employees Cooperative Company: 2%

2. Samat Samaneh Samat Samaneh was founded in 2012 with the primary objective of developing and maintaining technological infrastructure for the Central Securities Depository of Iran (CSDI). Its core functions include the provision of value-added IT services, risk management systems, data security, the design and implementation of post-trade systems, as well as network monitoring, data protection, and backup services.

Shareholding structure:

- Central Securities Depository of Iran: 99.97%
- SEO Cooperative Company: 0.01%
- Capital Market Central Asset Management Company: 0.01%
- Other Subsidiaries: 0.01%

3. Iran Financial Center (IFC) The Iran Financial Center (IFC), established in 2008, is a professional education and research institute focused on the Iranian capital market. It offers a variety of training programs, professional workshops, and market-oriented research aimed at enhancing the expertise of capital market participants and supporting transparency, development, and standard-setting within the sector.

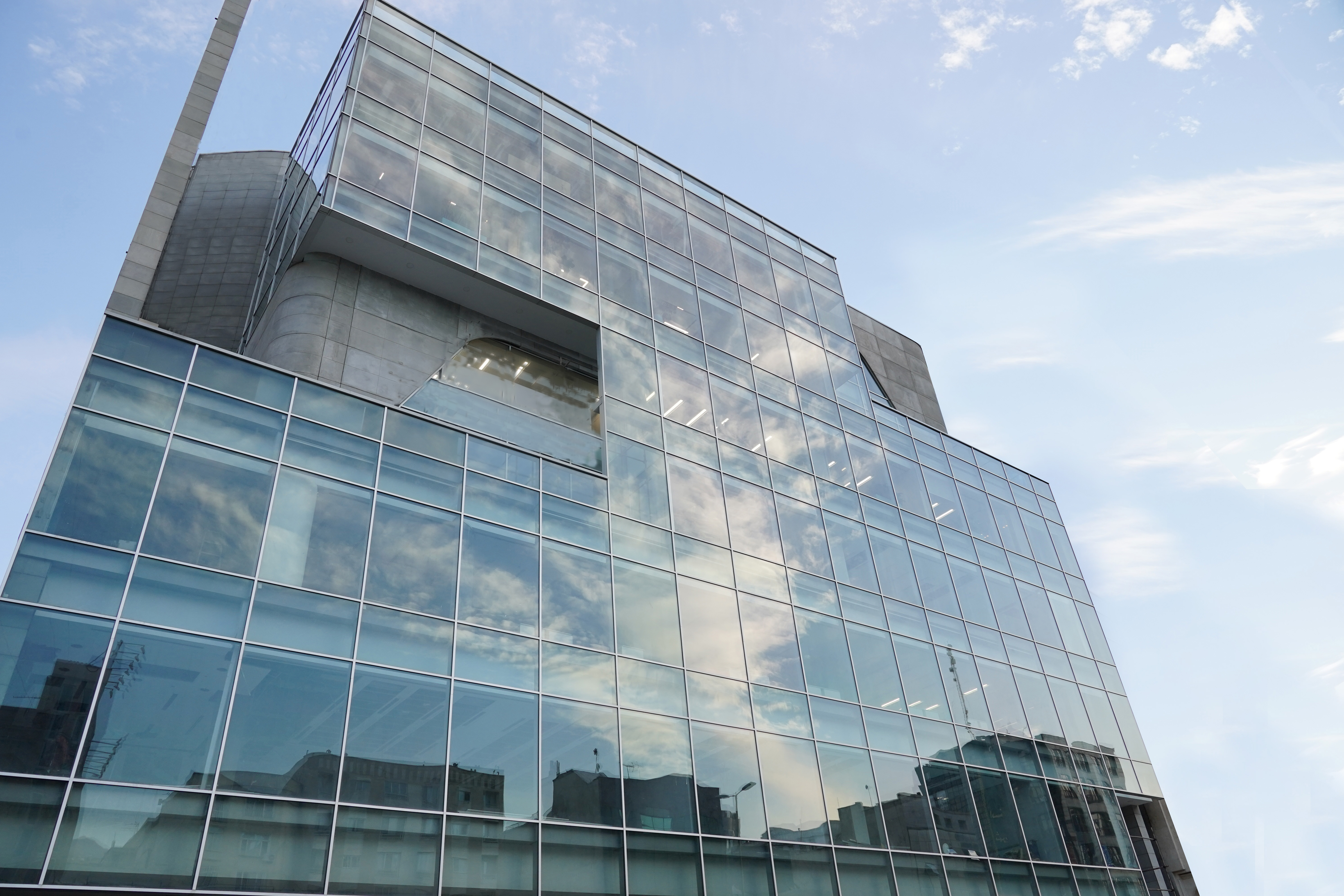
CSDI Building

== See also ==
- Asia-Pacific Central Securities Depository Group
