= Oil bourse =

Commodities exchange

An oil bourse is a commodities exchange where energy commodities such as crude oil and natural gas are traded. Examples include the New York Mercantile Exchange and the Intercontinental Exchange.

In 2005, an Iranian oil bourse was announced and promised to offer an alternative to trading oil in petrodollars, using instead the petroeuro as its trading currency. Despite several attempts to implement it over one and a half decades, the Iranian oil bourse never got off the ground and in January 2020 was officially cancelled.

== See also ==
- International Petroleum Exchange
