= Bahar Azadi Coin =

Iranian gold coin

Bahār-e Āzādī (Persian: بهار آزادی, lit. "[The] Spring of Freedom"), also known as "Imami", is an Iranian bullion gold coin minted by the Security Printing and Minting Organization of the Central Bank of the Islamic Republic of Iran (CBI), replacing the Pahlavi Coin after the Iranian Revolution. On the first edition of the coin Imam Reza Shrine and Calligraphy of the word علی ("Ali") was seen on both sides of the coin. Two years after the death of Ruhollah Khomeini in 1991, at first the left portrait of him was minted on the obverse of the coins which replaced by right three face instead of the calligraphy.

There is also 1/4, 1/2, 2 1/2, and 5 Bahar Azadi coins; as could be seen in Pahlavi Coins.

The 5 Azadi coins minted only in 1979 and were commemorative for the first anniversary of the Islamic Revolution in Iran. The 2 1/2 Azadi coins minted in 1979 are commemorative for the Islamic Revolution, as well. The 2 1/2 Azadi coins of 1999 are commemorative for 100th Anniversary of Khomeini's birth year, and of 2008 are not commemorative but have a low mintage and are scarce.

The smaller Azadi coins (1/4 , 1/2 and 1 Azadi coins) minted in other years, but discontinuously. The last Bahar Azadi Coins of 1/4 , 1/2 and 1 have the coinage date of ۱۳۸۶ (2007), although they have been minted in following years. The three face of Ruhollah Khomeini can be seen only on 1 and 2 1/2 Azadi Coins which has been minted by CBI; the 1/4 and 1/2 Azadi Coins have a motif of Imam Reza Shrine on obverse and the word Ali calligraphy (three time repeat of word علی in a regular hexagon) on the reverse and as previous minted by Bank Melli Iran (BMI). In 09 Aug 2010 and coincide with 50th anniversary of CBI foundation a new edition of Bahar Azadi coins with a weight of about one gram minted. Unlike other Bahar Azadi Coins the title of them was originated from their weight; "One Gerami" (یک گرمی) and there is no coinage date on. They are supplied in a polymer package with banknote and the lack of this pack is unusual and makes the price decreased. There is a motif of Ruhollah Khomeini on the obverse of these coins while the calligraphy of Ali on the reverse with a Persian legend of CBI.

Properties of Bahar Azadi Coin
Size	Coin Weight (g)	Pure Gold Weight (g)	Diameter (mm)	Purity
1/8	1.01	0.909	13.3	0.900
1/4	2.03325	1.83059	16	0.900
1/2	4.0665	3.66119	19	0.900
1	8.13598	7.32238	22	0.900
2 1/2	20.3325	18.3059	30	0.900
5	40.665	36.6119	40	0.900

As of June 2018, a total of 7,600,000 gold coins have been minted by the CBI (i.e. roughly one coin for 10 persons in Iran).

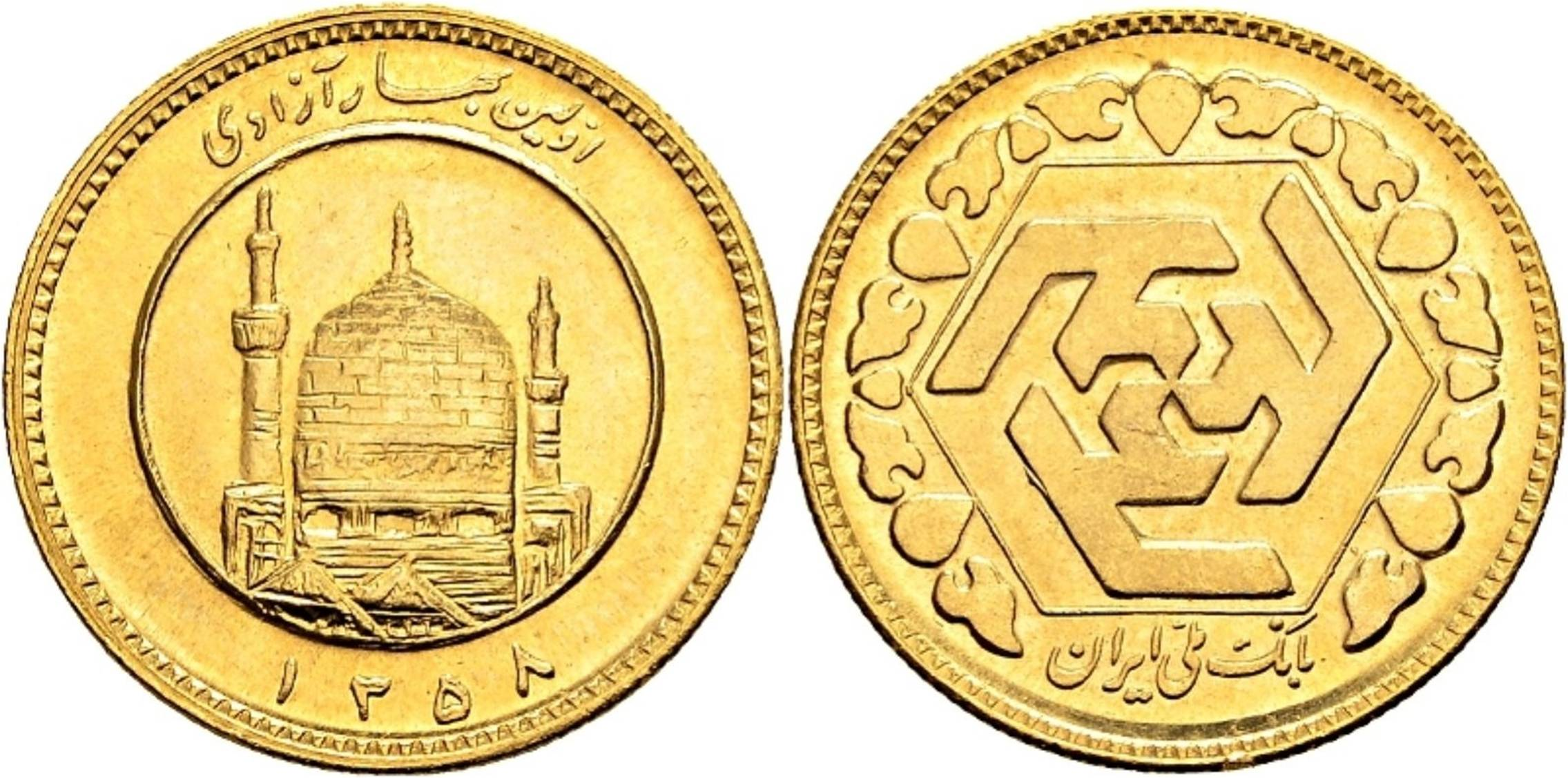
The first Bahar Azadi coin with title of "The First Spring of Freedom"; minted in 1979.

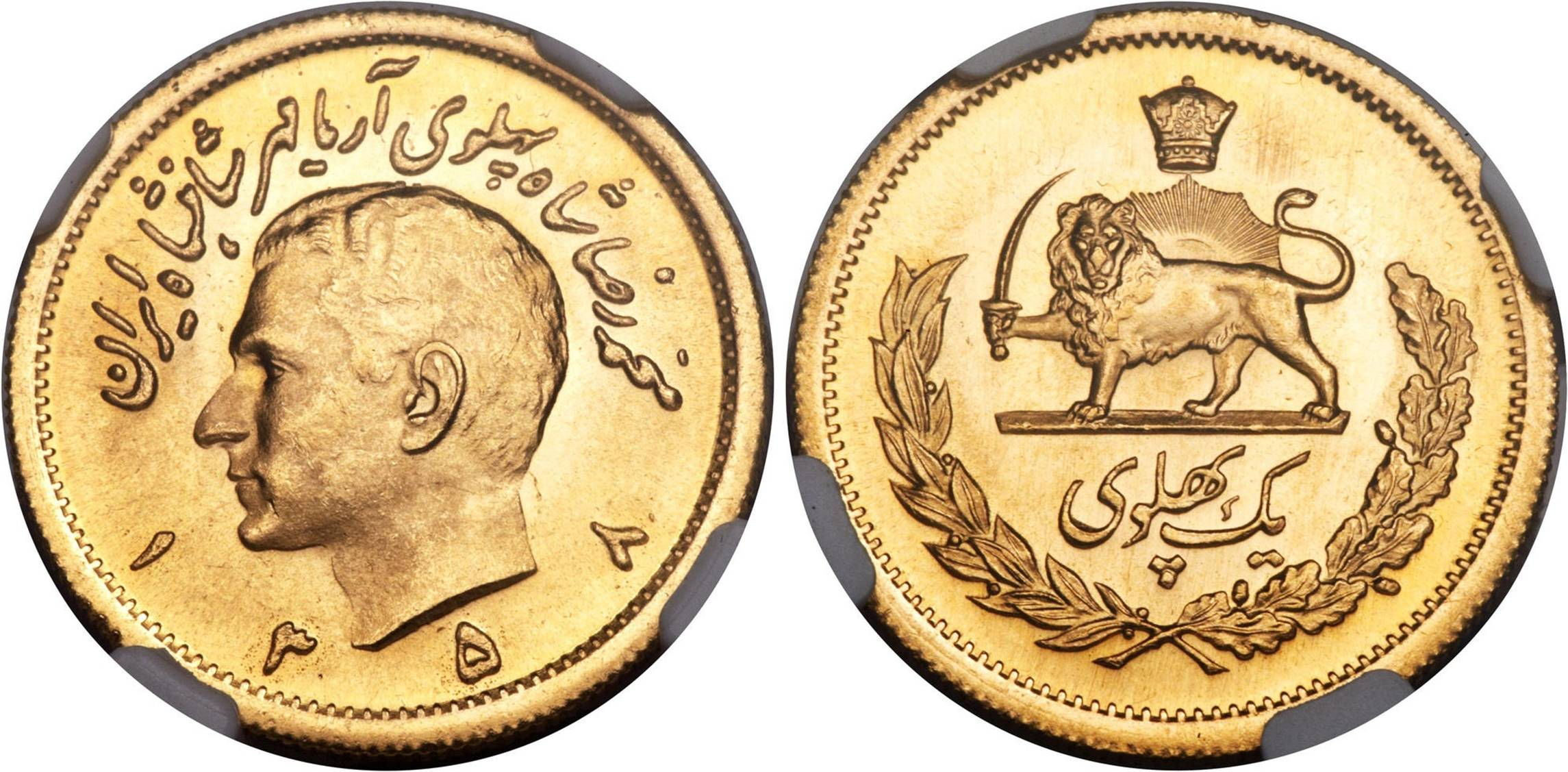
The last Pahlavi coin minted in 1978 with coinage date of 1979.

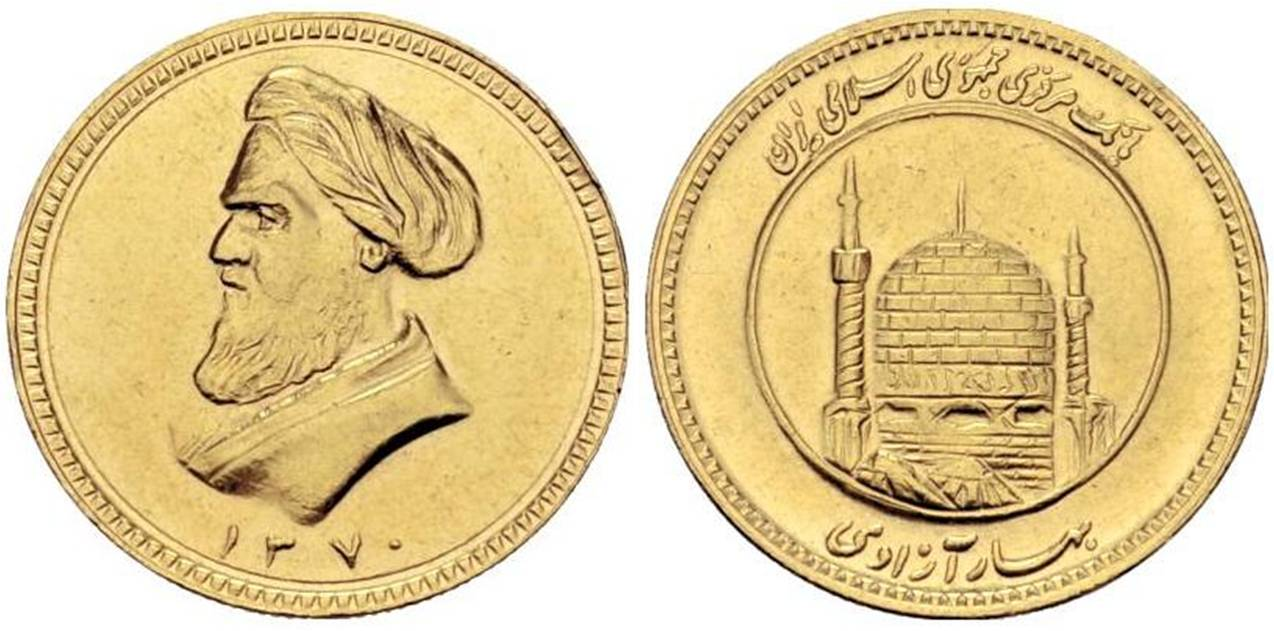
The first Bahar Azadi (Imami) Coin with the left portrait of Ruhollah Khomeini as seen in Pahlavi gold coins (left head of Mohammad Reza Pahlavi); minted only in 1991.

The gold coin has a purity rate of 90% and weighs 8.13598 grams.

== See also ==
- Bullion
- Bullion coin
- Central Bank of Iran
- Inflation hedge
- Iran Mercantile Exchange
