= Iran Mercantile Exchange =

Commodity market in Tehran

- بورس کالای ایران
- Type: Commodities exchange
- Location: Tehran, Iran
- Founded: 2007
- Owner: IME is 30% owned by individuals and 70% by legal and financial entities.
- Key people: Javad Jahromi (CEO)
- Currency: Iranian rial
- Commodities: Industrial products, agricultural products, petrochemicals
- Website: http://en.ime.co.ir/

The Iran Mercantile Exchange (Persian: بورس کالای ایران, IME) is a commodities exchange located in Tehran, Iran. Established on 20 September 2007 from the merger of the Tehran Metal Exchange and the Iran Agricultural Exchange, IME trades in agricultural, metal and mineral, oil and petrochemical products in the stock market and gold coin in the futures market.

== Commodities ==
IME facilitates the trading of commodities and products through its markets.

IME's Listed Commodities on Different Trading Floors

Main Group	Sub-Group	Commodities
Physical Market	Industrial & Mineral	Steel, Copper, Iron Ore, Aluminum, Zinc and rare metals concentrate, Gold bar
Physical Market	Agricultural Products	Barley, Wheat, Maize, Sugar, Crude Vegetable Oil, Frozen Chicken, and Meals, Saffron, Cumin Seed, Pistachios
Physical Market	Petrochemical Products	PP, PE, LDPE, aromatics, SBR feed stocks, MS, PS
Physical Market	Oil Products	Lube Cut, Insulation, Oil, Bitumen, Vacuum Bottom, Lube Cut, Slap Wax
Side Market	Side Market	Various Products with Non-Continuous Offering: Steel, Scraps, Polymers, Zinc, Chemicals, Minerals, Feeds, Copper, Sulfate, Lime
Derivatives Market	Futures Contracts	Saffron, Cumin Seed, Pistachios
Derivatives Market	Options Contracts	Gold Coins
Financial Market	Standard Parallel SALAM Contracts	Cement, Steel, Iron Ore, Ethylene, Concentrate, Wheat, Frozen Chicken, PVC
Financial Market	Certificates of Deposit	Gold Coins, Maize, Barley, Pistachios, Saffron
Financial Market	Investment Funds	Gold Coins. See also: Iranian gold coin

== Products ==
=== Industrial ===
- Steel
- Aluminum
- Copper
- Gold Bar
- Zinc
- Lead
- Precious Metals
- Nickel
- Industrial & Mineral (including cement)

=== Petrochemicals & Oil by-products ===
- Bitumen
- Chemical
- Polymers
- Sulfur
- Base Oil
- Lube Cut

=== Agricultural ===
- Grains Group: various kinds of corn, grain, wheat, rice, bran
- Dried and Trans Products: various kinds of pistachio, date, raisins, saffron, cumin, tea, sugar
- Oil Meals and Seeds Group: various kinds of oily seeds like soybean and oil cake seeds like soybean, colza, cotton seed, sunshade, Safflower cake, corn, palm
- Cereals Group: pea, lentil
- Frozen Chicken

== New products ==
In 2016, IME introduced gold futures and options (as hedging tools).

== Supervision and regulation ==
The Securities and Exchange Organization (SEO) is the sole regulatory entity for the regulation and development of the capital market in Iran. In 2013, Iran Mercantile Exchange joined the Federation of Euro-Asian Stock Exchanges (FEAS) as an observer member.

== Tradable contracts ==
- Spot contract
- Forward contract
- Contract on Credit
- Futures contract (since 2008)
- Options contract

== Trading system ==
Trading in IME is based on open outcry auction using electronic trading platform, an interaction of bids and offers made by the buying and selling brokers.

== IME Statistics ==
Source: Central Bank of Iran
IME Exchange (Including spot, credit and forward transactions)	2007/08	2008/09	2009/10	2010/11^{1}	2011/12	2012/13	2013/14
Agricultural - Volume (thousand tons)	273.0	173.5	175.2	1,633.9	549.6	184.5	266.2
Agricultural - Value (billion rials)	772.6	3,729.7	484.8	3,729.7	3,792.8	1,346.5	2,748.5
Manufacturing and Metal - Volume (thousand tons)	6,443.8	6,679.7	7,438.5	8,694.0	11,685.8	13,172.0	13,555.2
Manufacturing and Metal - Value (billion rials)	58,044.2	62,120.6	53,842.0	75,235.5	102,534.1	197,341	226,211.0
Oil and Petrochemical - Volume (thousand tons)	89.7	4,339.2	7,052.9	6,662.6	8,116.6	8,352.0	10,572.0
Oil and Petrochemical - Value (billion rials)	352.7	19,921.0	36,450.7	41,478.0	64,360.8	116,387.0	199,113.0
Grand Total - Volume (thousand tons)	6,806.5	11,192.4	14,666.6	16,990.5	20,352.0	21,708.5	24,393.4
Grand Total - Value (billion rials)	59,169.4	82,685.3	90,777.5	120,443.2	170,687.7	315,074.5	428,072.5

1 Due to the reclassification of "cement" under "manufacturing and mining products", figures for 2010/11 have been revised. Previously, "cement" was classified under "oil and petrochemical products".
