= Rights issue =

Dividend of subscription rights to buy additional securities in a company

A rights issue or rights offer is a dividend of subscription rights to buy additional securities in a company made to the company's existing security holders. When the rights are for equity securities, such as shares, in a public company, it can be a non-dilutive pro rata way to raise capital. Rights issues are typically sold via a prospectus or prospectus supplement. With the issued rights, existing security-holders have the privilege to buy a specified number of new securities from the issuer at a specified price within a subscription period. In a public company, a rights issue is a form of public offering (different from most other types of public offering, where shares are issued to the general public).

Rights issues may be particularly useful for all publicly traded companies as opposed to other more dilutive financing options. As equity issues are generally preferable to debt issues from the company's viewpoint, companies usually opt for a rights issue in order to minimize dilution and maximize the useful life of tax loss carryforwards. Since in a rights offering there is no change of control and a "no-sale theory" applies, companies are able to preserve tax loss carry-forwards better than via either follow-on offerings or other more dilutive financings. It's one of the types in modes of issue of securities both in public and private companies.

== How it works ==
A rights issue is directly distributed as dividend to all shareholders of record or through broker dealers of record and may be exercised in full or partially. Subscription rights may be transferable, allowing the subscription-rightsholder to sell them on the open market. A rights issue to shareholders is generally made as a tax-free dividend on a ratio basis (e.g. a dividend of three subscription rights for two shares of common stock issued and outstanding). Because the company receives shareholders' money in exchange for shares, a rights issue is a source of capital.

=== Considerations ===
In rights issue, the financial manager has to consider:

- Engaging a dealer-manager or broker-dealer to manage the offering process
- Selling group and broker-dealer participation
- Subscription price per new share
- Number of new shares to be sold
- The value of rights vs. trading price of the subscription rights
- The effect of rights on the value of the current share
- The effect of rights to shareholders of record and new shareholders and rightsholders

=== Underwriting ===
Rights issues may be underwritten. The role of the underwriter is to guarantee that the funds sought by the company will be raised. The agreement between the underwriter and the company is set out in a formal underwriting agreement. Typical terms of an underwriting require the underwriter to subscribe for any shares offered but not taken up by shareholders. The underwriting agreement will normally enable the underwriter to terminate its obligations in defined circumstances. A sub-underwriter in turn sub-underwrites some or all of the obligations of the main underwriter; the underwriter passes its risk to the sub-underwriter by requiring the sub-underwriter to subscribe for or purchase a portion of the shares for which the underwriter is obliged to subscribe in the event of a shortfall. Underwriters and sub-underwriters may be financial institutions, stock-brokers, major shareholders of the company or other related or unrelated parties.

=== Over‐subscription privilege ===
Some rights issues include an "over‐subscription privilege", allowing investors to buy additional shares beyond the number offered with the basic subscription privilege, if those additional shares are available. Typically the number of over‐subscription shares that can be purchased by an investor is capped as no more than the amount of his/her basic subscription. If not all the over-subscription rights can be filled, they will be partially filled on a pro rata basis.

== Basic example ==
An investor: Mr. A had 100 shares of company X at a total investment of $40,000, assuming that he purchased the shares at $400 per share and that the stock price did not change between the purchase date and the date at which the rights were issued.

Assuming a 1:1 subscription rights issue at an offer price of $200, Mr. A will be notified by a broker-dealer that he has the option to subscribe for an additional 100 shares of common stock of the company at the offer price. Now, if he exercises his option, he would have to pay an additional $20,000 in order to acquire the shares, thus effectively bringing his average cost of acquisition for the 200 shares to $300 per share ((40,000+20,000)/200=300). Although the price on the stock markets should reflect a new price of $300 (see below), the investor is actually not making any profit nor any loss. In many cases, the stock purchase right (which acts as an option) can be traded at an exchange. In this example, the price of the right would adjust itself to $100 (ideally).

The company: Company X has 100 million outstanding shares. The share price currently quoted on the stock exchanges is $400 thus the market capitalization of the stock would be $40 billion (outstanding shares times share price).

If all the shareholders of the company choose to exercise their stock option, the company's outstanding shares would increase by 100 million. The market capitalization of the stock would increase to $60 billion (previous market capitalization + cash received from owners of rights converting their rights to shares), implying a share price of $300 ($60 billion / 200 million shares). If the company were to do nothing with the raised money, its earnings per share (EPS) would be reduced by half. However, if the equity raised by the company is reinvested (e.g. to acquire another company), the EPS may be impacted depending upon the outcome of the reinvestment.

== Stock dilution ==
Rights offerings offset the dilutive effect of issuing more shares. For this reason, stock-exchange rules don't require that shareholders approve rights offerings if the company offers at least 20% of outstanding shares at a discount. Because rights offerings are unpopular, companies typically choose them as a last resort, perhaps due to insufficient investor demand.

== Tax treatment in the United States ==
If rights are exercised, they aren't taxed. Like with an ordinary security purchase, taxation happens when the security is sold. The cost basis of the shares is "the subscription price plus the tax basis for the exercised rights". The holding period begins at the time of exercise.

If rights are let to expire, they don't count as a deductible loss, as they have no tax basis in this case.

== See also ==
- Warrant (finance)
- Share purchase plan
