= United States sanctions against Iran =

Trade restrictions levied by the United States government

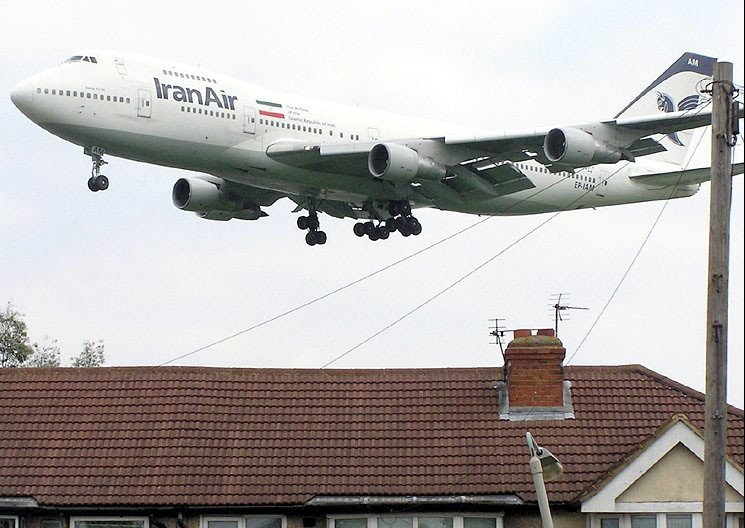
The United States imposed sanctions and bans of aviation companies from selling aircraft and repair parts to Iranian airlines in 1995. Iranian-registered commercial airplanes (such as this Iran Air Boeing 747-100B for example) were also banned from entering U.S. airspace due to the sanctions.

Since the 1979 Iranian Revolution, the United States has imposed a series of economic, trade, scientific and military sanctions against Iran. United States economic sanctions are administered by the Office of Foreign Assets Control (OFAC), an agency of the United States Department of the Treasury. As of 2025, United States sanctions against Iran include a comprehensive global trade embargo and a prohibition on the sale of aircraft or repair parts to Iranian aviation companies.

The U.S. government expanded these sanctions in response to Iran's nuclear program and its support for groups designated by the United States as terrorist organizations, including Hezbollah, Hamas, and Palestine Islamic Jihad. Iranian involvement with Shia militias in Iraq and the Houthi movement in the Yemen civil war are also in contention.

In December 2025, US treasury secretary Scott Bessent labelled the collapse of the Iranian currency as the "grand culmination" of the U.S. strategy.

In August 2026, amidst the 2026 Iran war, US president Donald Trump declared "economic d-day," announcing sanctions on nations trading with Iran.

== Legal basis ==
United States sanctions can be imposed under the National Emergencies Act (NEA) of 1976, the International Emergency Economic Powers Act (IEEPA) of 1977 and the Iran and Libya Sanctions Act of 1996 (ILSA, later renamed to Iran Sanctions Act (ISA)). The national emergencies underlying these sanctions must be continued annually to remain in effect. Iran-specific sanctions have also been imposed through legislation including the Comprehensive Iran Sanctions, Accountability, and Divestment Act of 2010, the Iran Threat Reduction and Syria Human Rights Act of 2012, and Iran Freedom and Counter-Proliferation Act of 2012, and the Countering America's Adversaries Through Sanctions Act of 2017. Additional Iran sanctions legislation was enacted in 2024.

== Carter presidency ==
United States President Carter imposed sanctions against Iran in November 1979 after radical students seized the United States Embassy in Tehran and took hostages, after the United States permitted the exiled Shah of Iran to enter the United States for medical treatment. Executive Order 12170 froze about US$8.1 billion in Iranian assets, including bank deposits, gold and other properties. It also imposed a trade embargo. The sanctions were lifted in January 1981 as part of the Algiers Accords, which were a negotiated settlement of the hostages' release.

Iran and the United States have had no formal diplomatic relations since 7 April 1980. Instead, Pakistan serves as Iran's protecting power in the United States, while Switzerland serves as the United States' protecting power in Iran. Contacts are carried out through the Iranian Interests Section of the Pakistani Embassy in Washington, D.C., and the US Interests Section of the Swiss Embassy in Tehran.

== Reagan presidency ==
United States President Ronald Reagan imposed an arms embargo in 1983 on Iran, including United States military spare parts to the military during the Iran–Iraq War (1981–1988).

An embargo on Iranian goods and services was imposed in 1987 in response to Iran's actions from 1981 to 1987 against U.S. forces and merchant vessels as well as Iran's refusal to implement United Nations Security Council Resolution 598 and the government's support for terrorism.

== Clinton presidency ==
United States President Bill Clinton imposed some of the toughest sanctions against Iran in March 1995, during the presidency of Akbar Hashemi Rafsanjani, in response to the Iranian nuclear program and Iranian support for Hezbollah, Hamas, and Palestine Islamic Jihad, that are considered terrorist organizations by the United States under Executive Order 12957, to prohibit the United States from trading in Iran's oil industry. In May 1995 Clinton also issued Executive Order 12959 to prohibit the United States from trading with Iran. Trade with the United States, which had been growing since the end of the Iran–Iraq War, ended abruptly.

=== Iran and Libya Sanctions Act ===
The Iran and Libya Sanctions Act (ILSA) was signed into law on 5 August 1996 by President Clinton. ISA (the renamed ILSA in 2006) targets both American and non-American businesses that make investments over $20 million in Iran for the development of petroleum resources in Iran. They face having imposed against them two out of seven possible penalties by the United States:

- denial of Export-Import Bank assistance,
- denial of export licenses for exports to the violating company,
- prohibition on loans or credits from United States financial institutions of over $10 million in any 12-month period,
- prohibition on designation as a primary dealer for United States government debt instruments,
- prohibition on serving as an agent of the United States or as a repository for U.S. government funds,
- denial of United States government procurement opportunities (consistent with WTO obligations), and
- a ban on all or some imports of the violating company.

ISA was extended several times under the presidency of George W. Bush, and on 1 December 2016, it was extended under President Barack Obama, before vacating office, for a further ten years.

=== Early Khatami government ===
After the election of Iranian reformist President Mohammad Khatami in 1997, President Clinton eased sanctions on Iran. In 2000 the sanctions for items such as pharmaceuticals, medical equipment, caviar and Persian rugs were reduced.

== Bush presidency ==
In February 2004, during the final year of Khatami's presidency, the United States Department of the Treasury in the presidency of George W. Bush ruled against editing or publishing scientific manuscripts from Iran, and stated that the American scientists collaborating with Iranians could be prosecuted. As a consequence, the Institute of Electrical and Electronics Engineers (IEEE) temporarily stopped editing manuscripts from Iranian researchers and took steps to clarify the OFAC guidelines concerning its publishing and editing activities. In April 2004 IEEE received a response from OFAC which fully resolved that no licenses were needed for publishing works from Iran and that the entire IEEE publication process including peer review and editing was exempt from restrictions. On the other hand, the American Institute of Physics (AIP), the American Physical Society and the American Association for the Advancement of Science, which publishes Science, refused to comply, saying that the prohibition on publishing goes against freedom of speech.

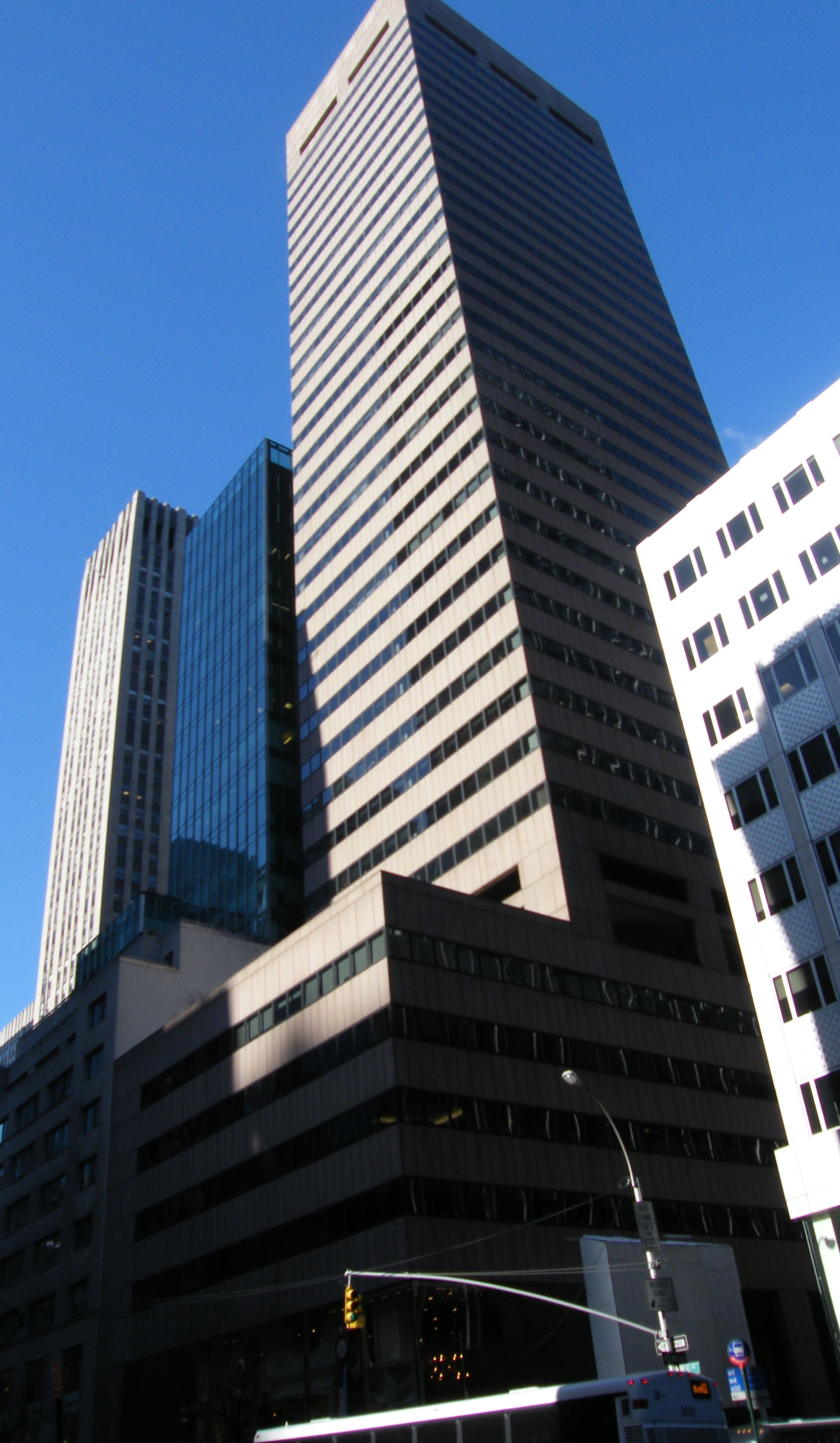
In December 2008 the United States government sought 40 percent interest in 650 Fifth Avenue on the edge of Rockefeller Center which it said was co-owned by Bank Melli.

After being elected president in 2005, President Ahmadinejad lifted the suspension of uranium enrichment that had been agreed with the EU3, and the International Atomic Energy Agency reported Iran's non-compliance with its safeguards agreement to the UN Security Council, leading to UN sanctions against Iran over its nuclear program.

In June 2005, President George W. Bush issued Executive Order 13382 freezing the assets of individuals connected with Iran's nuclear program. In June 2007, the U.S. state of Florida enacted a boycott on companies trading with Iran and Sudan, while New Jersey's state legislature was considering similar action.

The United Nations Security Council (UNSC) adopted Resolution 1737 in December 2006, Resolution 1747 in March 2007, Resolution 1803 in March 2008, and Resolution 1929 in June 2010.

=== Banking sanctions ===
Iranian financial institutions are barred from directly accessing the U.S. financial system, but they are permitted to do so indirectly through banks in other countries. In September 2006, the United States government imposed sanctions on Bank Saderat Iran, barring it from dealing with U.S. financial institutions, even indirectly. The move was announced by Stuart Levey, the undersecretary for the US Treasury, who accused the major state-owned bank in Iran of transferring funds for certain groups, including Hezbollah. Levey said that since 2001 a Hezbollah-controlled organization had received $50 million directly from Iran through Bank Saderat. He said the United States government would also persuade European banks and financial institutions not to deal with Iran. The following Iranian banks were prohibited from transferring money to or from United States banks:

- Bank Sepah
- Bank Saderat Iran
- Bank Melli Iran
- Bank Kargoshaee (aka Kargosa’i Bank)
- Arian Bank (aka Aryan Bank)

In other words, these banks were placed on the Office of Foreign Assets Control (OFAC) Specially Designated Nationals List (SDN List). The SDN List is a directory of entities and individuals who have been prohibited from accessing the U.S. financial system. Although difficult there are ways to carry out an OFAC SDN List removal.

As of early 2008, the targeted banks, such as Bank Mellat, had been able to replace banking relationships with a few large sanction-compliant banks with relationships with a larger number of smaller non-compliant banks. In 2008, the United States Department of the Treasury ordered Citigroup Inc. to freeze over $2 billion held for Iran in Citigroup accounts.

For individuals and small businesses, these banking restrictions have created a large opportunity for the hawala market, which allows Iranians to transfer money to and from foreign countries using an underground unregulated exchange system. In June 2010, in the case United States v. Banki, the use of the hawala method of currency transfer led to a criminal conviction against a U.S. citizen of Iranian origin. Banki was sentenced to two and a half years in federal prison; however, on the sentencing guidelines, this type of offense could result in imprisonment of up to 20 years.

== Obama presidency ==
On 24 June 2010, the United States Senate and House of Representatives passed the Comprehensive Iran Sanctions, Accountability, and Divestment Act of 2010 (CISADA), signed into law by President Obama on 1 July 2010. The CISADA greatly enhanced restrictions on Iran, including the rescission of the authorization for Iranian-origin imports for articles such as rugs, pistachios, and caviar. In response, President Obama issued Executive Order 13553 in September 2010 and Executive Order 13574 in May 2011, and Executive Order 13590 in November 2011.

The sanctions imposed on Iran at the beginning of 2012 "had persistent and significant effects on the Iranian economy. The cost reached its maximum of 19.1% of real gross domestic product 4 years after the application of the sanctions, and the economy has not fully recovered after their removal."

On 31 July 2013, members of the United States House of Representatives voted 400 to 20 in favor of toughened sanctions.

The United States imposed additional financial sanctions against Iran, effective 1 July 2013. An administration official explained that according to the new Executive Order "significant transactions in the rial will expose anyone to sanctions," and predicted “it should cause banks and exchanges to dump their rial holdings.” This took place as Iran's president-elect Hassan Rouhani was scheduled to take office on 3 August 2013.

=== Sanctions against third parties ===
In 2014, U.S. authorities put a $5 million bounty on Chinese businessman Li Fangwei, whom they alleged to have been instrumental in evading sanctions against Iran's missile programs.

In 2014, French bank BNP Paribas agreed to pay an $8.9 billion fine, the largest ever, for violating United States sanctions. Germany's Commerzbank, France's Credit Agricole and Swiss UBS have also been fined. French President François Hollande said: "When the (European) Commission goes after Google or digital giants which do not pay the taxes they should in Europe, America takes offence. And yet, they quite shamelessly demand 8 billion from BNP or 5 billion from Deutsche Bank."

In 2015, Germany's largest bank Deutsche Bank was fined $258 million for violating U.S. sanctions against Iran, Libya and Syria.

In April 2026, a 44-year-old Iranian citizen, Reza Dindar, was extradited to the United States for his alleged involvement in a scheme to violate U.S. sanctions on Iran.

September 8, 2026 The United States Department of the Treasury sanctioned 27 Iranian airlines as part of its "Operation Economic Outcast" campaign, targeting Iran's aviation sector and other entities accused of supporting the country's aviation procurement networks. The sanctions also targeted companies and individuals in Turkey, the United Arab Emirates, Malaysia, and other jurisdictions involved in supporting Iranian aviation.

=== Iran nuclear deal ===
Under the Joint Comprehensive Plan of Action (known commonly as the Iran nuclear deal), signed in July 2015, the United States agreed to cancel most of the U.S. sanctions against Iran, with some safeguard provisions, in return for limitations on Iran's nuclear program.

== First Trump presidency ==
In April 2018, the United States Department of Justice joined the United States Treasury Department's Office of Foreign Assets Control (OFAC), and the Department of Commerce to investigate possible violations of U.S. sanctions against Iran by China's Huawei. The U.S. inquiry stemmed from an earlier sanctions-violation probe that ultimately led to penalties against another Chinese technology company, ZTE Corporation. Huawei's deputy chair and CFO Meng Wanzhou, daughter of the company's founder Ren Zhengfei, was arrested in Vancouver, Canada on 1 December 2018, under an extradition request by United States authorities for allegedly putting HSBC bank at risk of violating U.S. sanctions on Iran.

In May 2019, the United States warned banks, investors, traders, and companies of the United Kingdom which trade with Iran through the Instrument in Support of Trade Exchanges (Instex) special purpose vehicle, that they will be punished somehow by Washington.

The Trump administration imposed sanctions on two UAE based aviation companies, Parthia Cargo and Delta Parts Supply, that violated U.S. sanctions on Iran's Mahan Air by providing them logistics services and supplying parts to the Iranian airline. Federal prosecutors also filed criminal charges against one of the companies under violation of United States export control regulations.

=== Countering America's Adversaries Through Sanctions Act ===
The Countering America's Adversaries Through Sanctions Act (CAATSA) was enacted in August 2017 and imposed sanctions against Iran, as well as against Russia and North Korea. CAATSA requires the President to impose sanctions against: (1) Iran's ballistic missile or weapons of mass destruction programs, (2) the sale or transfer to Iran of military equipment or the provision of related technical or financial assistance, and (3) Iran's Islamic Revolutionary Guard Corps and affiliated foreign persons. The President may also impose sanctions against persons responsible for violations of internationally recognized human rights committed against individuals in Iran, and can waive the imposition or continuation of sanctions.

=== Post-JCPOA sanctions ===
In May 2018, the United States President Donald Trump announced an intention to withdraw from the Joint Comprehensive Plan of Action (JCPOA or Iran nuclear deal), and subsequently imposed several new non-nuclear sanctions against Iran, some of which were condemned by Iran as a violation of the deal.

On 17 May 2018, the European Commission announced its intention to implement the blocking statute of 1996 to declare United States sanctions against Iran null and void in Europe and ban European citizens and companies from complying with them. The EC also instructed the European Investment Bank to facilitate European companies' investment in Iran.

These treasury and other arms of the government, both under Obama and Trump, have basically weakened the JCPOA extensively, which has kept a lot of the sanctions regime intact. In August 2018, the Trump administration reimposed sanctions and warned that anyone doing business with Iran will not be able to do business with the United States. However, the United States will be granting waivers to certain countries. For example, Iraq was granted a waiver that would allow the country to continue purchasing gas, energy and food products from Iran on the condition that the purchases were not paid for in United States dollars.

In 2018, the International Court of Justice (ICJ) "ordered" the United States government to revoke the sanctions on the basis of the 1955 United States-Iran "Friendship Treaty", that had been signed with the government that had been overthrown by the 1979 Islamic Revolution. In response, the United States withdrew from two international agreements with Iran.

In October 2018, Reuters reported that JPMorgan Chase bank had "agreed to pay $5.3 million to settle allegations it violated Cuban Assets Control Regulations, Iranian sanctions and Weapons of Mass Destruction sanctions 87 times, the United States Treasury said".

British bank Standard Chartered faced a $1.5 billion fine by the U.S. agencies for violating Iran sanctions.

In November 2018, the United States officially reinstated all sanctions against Iran that had been lifted before the United States withdrew from the JCPOA.

In April 2019, the United States threatened to sanction countries continuing to buy oil from Iran after an initial six-month waiver announced in November expired.

In June 2019, Trump imposed sanctions on Iranian Supreme Leader Khamenei, his office and those closely affiliated with his access to key financial resources.

On 31 July 2019, the United States placed sanctions on Iran's foreign minister, Mohammad Javad Zarif.

In August 2018, Total S.A. officially withdrew from the Iranian South Pars gas field because of sanctions pressure from the United States, leaving CNPC to take up their 50.1% stake in the natural gas field, of which it had already 30%. It held this 80.1% share until it withdrew its investment in October 2019 due once again to U.S. sanctions, according to Oil Minister Bijan Zangeneh and the SHANA news agency.

On 19 May 2020, the United States sanctions targeted Shanghai Saint Logistics Limited, a PRC-based company that provides general sales agent services for Mahan Air. The United States claimed that Iran used Mahan Air to carry gold from fuel sales to Venezuela. Also, Iran denied the allegation.

On 8 June 2020, the United States imposed new sanctions of Iran Shipping Lines (IRISL) and its Shanghai-based subsidiary, E-Sail Shipping Company Ltd (E-Sail).

The individuals and companies that had been added to United States sanctions list in 2018:

- Bahadori, Masoud
- Bateni, Naser
- Bazargan, Farzad
- Behzad, Morteza Ahmadali
- Cambis, Dimitris
- Chaghazardy, Mohammad Kazem
- Dajmar, Mohammad Hossein
- Eslami, Mansour
- Ghalebani, Ahmad
- Jashnsaz, Seifollah
- Khalili, Jamshid
- Khosrowtaj, Mojtaba
- Mohaddes, Seyed Mahmoud
- Moinie, Mohammad
- Nikousokhan, Mahmoud
- Parsaei, Reza
- Pouransari, Hashem
- Rezvanianzadeh, Mohammed Reza
- Saeedi, Mohammed
- Safdari, Seyed Jabe
- Seyyedi, Seyed Nasser Mohammad
- Suri, Muhammad
- Tabatabaei, Seyyed Mohammad Ali Khatibi
- Yazdanjoo, Mohammad Ali
- Yousefpour, Ali
- Ziracchian Zadeh, Mahmoud
- A.S.P. BUILDERS (A.S.P. Construction Company)
- AA Energy FZCO
- Advanced Technologies Company of Iran
- AEOI Basij Resistance Center
- Agricultural, Medical and Industrial Research Center
- Arash Shipping Enterprises limited
- Arta Shipping Enterprises Limited
- Asan Shipping Enterprise Limited
- ATLANTIC SHIPPING & TRANS
- Belize Shipping Line Services LTD
- Belize Ship and Logistics Limited
- Blue Tanker Shipping SA
- Bushehr Shipping Company Limited
- Arjan Electricity and Energy Generation Management
- Arman Resources Equip and Support Management
- ASCOTEC Holding GmbH
- ASCOTEC Japan K.K.
- ASCOTEC Mineral & Machinery GmbH
- ASCOTEC Science & Technology GMBH
- Ascotec Steel Trading GmbH
- Asia Energy General Trading LLC
- BIIS Maritime Limited
- Atieh Sazan Day
- Atlas Kian Qeshm
- Atomic Energy Organization of Iran
- Atomic Fuel Development Engineering Company
- Azar Investment
- Azar Pad Qeshm Co. (APCO)
- Azerbaijan Construction
- Iran Insurance Company
- Baghmisheh Residential Development
- Behsaz Kashane Tehran Construction Co
- Behsazan Pars Equipment Development
- Behshahr Industrial Development Corp
- Banco Internacional de Desarrollo C.A.
- Bandar Imam Petrochemical Company Ltd.
- BMIIC International General Trading
- Bou Ali Sina Petrochemical Co.
- Breyeller Stahl Technology GmbH & Co
- Buali Investment Company
- Caspian maritime Limited
- Cement Industry Investment and Development Company
- Commercial Pars Oil Company
- Credit Institution for Development
- Cylinder System L.T.D.
- Damavand Electricity and power engineering
- Damavand Power Generation Company
- Dana Integrated System for Electronic Interactions Co.
- Danesh Shipping Company Limited
- DARYA Capital Administration GmbH
- Daryanavard Kish
- Davar Shipping Co LTD
- Day Bank Brokerage Co.
- e-Commerce Day
- Day Exchange Company
- Day Investment Company
- Day Iranian Financial and Accounting Services Company
- Day Leasing Company
- Dena Tankers Fze
- Diamond Transportation Limited
- Diamond Transportation Limited Company
- EDBI Exchange Broker (EDBI Exchange Company)
- EDBI Stock Brokerage Company
- Eighth Ocean GmbH & Co. KG
- Seventh Ocean Administration GmbH
- Eleventh Ocean GmbH & Co. KG
- Amin Investment Bank
- Arian Bank
- Ayandeh Bank
- Bank Kargoshaee
- Bank Keshavarzi Iran
- Bank Maskan
- Bank Melli Iran
- Bank of Industry and Mine
- Bank Torgovoy Kapital Zao
- Bank Sepah
- Bank Sepah International PLC
- Central Bank of the Islamic Republic of Iran
- Shahr Bank
- Refah Bank
- Tejarat Bank
- Bank Day
- EN Bank

==== Iran reactions ====
Ali Khamenei had previously banned engaging in any dialogues or negotiations with the United States, especially the Trump administration. However in March 2025, senior Iranian officials conveyed a message that negotiating with the U.S. was crucial to prevent the Islamic Republic's potential collapse.

On 8 May 2019, according to article 36 of the JCPOA agreement, Iran was allowed to reply in case of non-compliance by other signatories. President Rouhani announced that Iran was acting in reply to "the European countries' failure" and held on to stockpiles of excess uranium and heavy water used in nuclear reactors. Rouhani said that Iran gave a 60-day deadline to remaining signatories of the JCPOA to protect it from U.S. sanctions and provide additional economic support. Otherwise, at the end of that deadline, Iran would exceed the limits on its stockpile of enriched uranium. In September 2019, as a third major step to scale down commitments to the 2015 nuclear accord, after another 60-day deadline, Iran nullified all limits on nuclear research and development.

=== Sanctions against IRGC ===
On 25 October 2007, the United States designated the Quds Force, a part of IRGC, a terrorist organization under Executive Order 13224, for providing material support to U.S.-designated terrorist organizations, prohibiting transactions between the group and U.S. citizens, and freezing any assets under United States jurisdiction.

On 18 May 2011, the United States imposed sanctions on Qasem Soleimani, the commander of the Quds Force, along with Syrian president Bashar al-Assad and other senior Syrian officials, due to Soleimani's alleged involvement in providing material support to the Syrian government. He was listed as a known terrorist, which forbade U.S. citizens from doing business with him.

On 8 April 2019, the United States imposed economic and travel sanctions on the IRGC and organizations, companies and individuals affiliated with it. Hossein Salami was one of the individuals listed.

On 15 April 2019, the United States designated the IRGC as a terrorist organization. The designation is still in force.

On 21 April 2019, a few days before United States sanctions were due to take effect, Iran Supreme Leader Ali Khamenei appointed Hossein Salami as the new commander-in-chief of the Islamic Revolutionary Guard Corps (IRGC).

On 7 June 2019, the United States imposed sanctions on some of the petroleum industry in Iran because they were owned by the IRGC.

On 24 June 2019, the US imposed sanctions on eight senior commanders of the navy, aerospace and ground forces components of IRGC.

In May 2020 the United States charged Iranian-Iraqi Amir Dianat and his Iranian business partner with money-laundering on behalf of the Quds Force and with violating sanctions.

The Joe Biden administration levied the sanctions on Iran's Islamic Revolutionary Guard Crops officials on 1 June 2023, who were convicted for plotting assassinations abroad, involving against John Bolton and Mike Pompeo. The sanctions targeted Mohammad Reza Ansari, an official with a unit of IRGC-Qods Force “tasked with undertaking covert operations abroad, including planning and conducting intelligence and lethal operations against Iranian dissidents and other non-Iranian nationals in the United States, the Middle East, Europe, and Africa”. The US sanctions will also affect Hossein Hafez Amini, a dual Iranian and Turkish national, for assisting the IRGC-QF's covert operations.

=== Other sanctions ===
On 3 September 2019, Trump added the Iran Space Agency, the Iranian Astronautics Research Institute and the Iranian Space Research Center to its sanctions list.

On 20 September 2019, the United States imposed sanctions on the Central Bank of Iran (CBI), the National Development Fund of Iran (NDF) and Etemad Tejarate Pars Co., an Iranian company that was used to transfer money to the Ministry of Defence and Armed Forces Logistics.

In October 2019, the US imposed sanctions on some of the Iranian construction sector which is owned by Iran's Islamic Revolutionary Guard Corps (IRGC), which it regards as a foreign terrorist organization. The US State Department also identified four “strategic materials” being used in connection with military, nuclear, or ballistic missile programs, making trade in them subject to sanctions. However, the department extended nuclear-cooperation waivers on Iran's civil nuclear program, renewing them for 90 days.

On 4 November 2019, the United States imposed new sanctions on the core inner circle of advisers to the Ayatollah Ali Khamenei. The new sanctions included one of his sons, Mojtaba Khamenei, the newly appointed head of Iran's judiciary, Ebrahim Raisi, the supreme leader's chief of staff, Mohammad Mohammadi Golpayegani, and others. The Trump administration also issued $20 million to a reward for information about a former FBI agent who disappeared in Iran 12 years previously.

On 8 October 2020, the United States imposed further sanctions on Iran's financial sector, targeting 18 Iranian banks. The banks targeted are Amin Investment Bank, Bank Keshavarzi Iran, Bank Maskan, Bank Refah Kargaran, Bank-e Shahr, Eghtesad Novin Bank, Gharzolhasaneh Resalat Bank, Hekmat Iranian Bank, Iran Zamin Bank, Karafarin Bank, Khavarmianeh Bank, Mehr Iran Credit Union Bank, Pasargad Bank, Saman Bank, Sarmayeh Bank, Tosee Taavon Bank, Tourism Bank and Islamic Regional Cooperation Bank.

In September 2020, the United States said that it imposed sanctions on Judge Seyyed Mahmoud Sadati, Judge Mohammad Soltani, Branch 1 of the Revolutionary Court of Shiraz, and Adel Abad, Orumiyeh, and Vakilabad Prisons. Elliott Abrams said "the sanctions targeted a judge who sentenced Iranian wrestler Navid Afkari to death," who was convicted of murdering a security guard during the 2018 Iranian protests.

== Biden presidency ==
United States President Joe Biden said on 8 February 2021, that he would not lift economic sanctions against Iran until Iran complies with the terms of the 2015 JCPOA nuclear deal. Iran's Supreme Leader Khamenei had previously said that Tehran would only return to compliance if the United States first lifted all economic sanctions. On the other hand, Iran said that it would suspend the implementation of the Additional Protocol, if the other parties to the 2015 nuclear pact do not fulfill their obligations by 21 February 2021.

On 22 September 2022, the United States Department of the Treasury announced sanctions against the Iran Morality Police as well as seven senior leaders of Iran's various security organizations, "for violence against protestors and the death of Mahsa Amini". These include Mohammad Rostami Cheshmeh Gachi, chief of Iran's Morality Police, and Kioumars Heidari, commander of the Iranian army's ground force, in addition to the Iranian Minister of Intelligence Esmail Khatib, Haj Ahmad Mirzaei, head of the Tehran division of the Morality Police, Salar Abnoush, deputy commander of the Basij militia, and two law enforcement commanders, Manouchehr Amanollahi and Qasem Rezaei of the LEF in Chaharmahal and Bakhtiari province of Iran. The sanctions would involve blocking any properties or interests in property within the jurisdiction of the US, and reporting them to the U.S. Treasury. Penalties would be imposed on any parties that facilitate transactions or services to the sanctioned entities.

In June 2023, the United States sanctioned a procurement network involving seven individuals and six entities in Iran and the People's Republic of China (PRC) for supporting the activities of the Ministry of Defense and Armed Forces Logistics, Parchin Chemical Industries, and P.B. Sadr as key actors in Iran's ballistic missile program.

In May 2024 American officials claimed that Iran uses Malaysian services to sell crude oil under U.S. sanctions. In a meeting with Nelson, the U.S. Treasury under-secretary, Home Minister Saifuddin Nasution Ismail, government official in Malaysia said that we only recognize the sanctions of the United Nations, and the sanctions of the United States and any other country are not recognized by Malaysia.

In September 2024, The United States imposed sanctions on 12 Iranian officials for human rights abuses. The sanctions targeted members of Iran's security forces involved in suppressing protests, prison officials linked to torture and executions, and operatives involved in targeting dissidents abroad. The U.S. Treasury highlighted the ongoing repression and called out the Iranian regime’s systematic human rights violations, including abuses against peaceful protesters and political activists.

In December 2024, the U.S. Treasury imposed sanctions on three vessels—MS Enola, MS Angia and MS Melenia—and four companies—Journey Investment company, Rose Shipping, Master Joint Co. and Passada Maritime—for trading in Iranian petroleum and petrochemical products.

== Second Trump presidency ==
Following Donald Trump's election to the presidency, as early as October 2024, a decline in Iranian oil exports to China was observed, driven by concerns over potential new sanctions that Trump might impose on Iran. In early 2025, the Shandong port, owned by the Chinese government, announced that it would not accept goods from companies and countries blacklisted by the Office of Foreign Assets Control, including Iran.

On 4 February 2025, US president Donald Trump reimposed his "maximum pressure" policy on Iran.

In February 2025, the Trump administration imposed new sanctions targeting an international network accused of selling millions of barrels of Iranian oil to China, with proceeds funding Iran's military and terrorist activities. The sanctions specifically targeted Sepehr Energy, described as a front company for Iran's Armed Forces General Staff, and included measures against associated oil tankers and individuals involved in these transactions. The imposed sanctions freeze the assets of the designated individuals and entities within the United States and bar them from receiving U.S. foreign assistance. The primary objective of these sanctions is to prevent Iran from acquiring nuclear weapons ("that threaten the civilized world") and to curb its support for regional terrorist proxy groups.

In April 2025, the United States imposed sanctions on six entities and two individuals based in Iran, the United Arab Emirates, and China for acquiring components that it alleges are connected to Iran’s drone and ballistic missile programs. This action is part of President Trump’s maximum pressure campaign against the Islamic Republic of Iran, aimed at disrupting the Islamic Revolutionary Guard Corps (IRGC) aerospace industry’s efforts to procure equipment for Iran’s military-industrial complex and drone program.

On 22 April 2025, the U.S. Department of the Treasury imposed sanctions on Iranian businessman Reza Zarrab and his network of companies for facilitating the sale of Iranian liquefied petroleum gas (LPG) in violation of U.S. sanctions. Zarrab, previously implicated in sanctions evasion schemes, is accused of using a complex network of front companies and intermediaries to export Iranian LPG, generating significant revenue for Iran's energy sector. The sanctions aim to disrupt these illicit financial networks and reinforce the U.S. commitment to enforcing sanctions against Iran's energy exports. As a result, all property and interests in property of the designated individuals and entities within U.S. jurisdiction are blocked, and U.S. persons are generally prohibited from engaging in transactions with them.

On 14 May 2025, the State Department imposed sanctions on three Iranian nationals and one Iranian entity associated with the Iranian Defense Innovation and Research Organization (SPND). All individuals sanctioned are alleged to be involved in the proliferation of weapons of mass destruction.

On 7 June 2025 the U.S. Treasury Department imposed sanctions on 10 individuals and 27 entities, including Iranian nationals and firms based in the UAE and Hong Kong. These targets include the Zarringhalam brothers, accused of laundering billions via shell companies tied to the IRGC and Iran’s Central Bank. The funds reportedly supported Iran’s nuclear and missile programs, oil sales, and terrorist proxies.

On 30 July, the United States imposed sanctions on 115 Iran-linked individuals, entities and vessels associated with Iranian oil or petrochemical products, aiming to complicate Iran's ability to finance its operations. Trump declared that any nation or individual engaging in the purchase of Iranian oil or petrochemical products would face sanctions from the United States.

In August 2025, a new series of U.S. sanctions were imposed on Iran, targeting companies and vessels associated with Antonis Margaritis for their role in facilitating the transportation and sale of Iranian oil.

In February 2026, U.S. president Donald Trump signed an executive order authorizing the imposition of tariffs of up to 25 percent on countries that conduct trade with Iran. The move was presented as part of Washington’s broader pressure campaign against Tehran, despite the continuation of diplomatic talks between Iran and the United States at the time. According to Reuters, the measure targets Iran’s trade partners rather than Iran directly and is intended to discourage international commerce with the country.

In 2026, US treasury secretary Scott Bessent stated that the United States had seized nearly 500 million U.S. dollars in cryptocurrency assets linked to Iranian entities as part of a broader sanctions enforcement campaign. The announcement was made during a media interview in which he described the operation as part of efforts to disrupt financial networks associated with Iran. According to Treasury officials, the action was carried out under a sanctions enforcement initiative targeting assets and financial channels allegedly used for sanctions evasion. The campaign also included measures such as freezing bank accounts and restricting access to international financial systems.

In August 2026, declaring "economic d-day" during the 2026 Iran war, Trump announced that any nation trading with the Iranian regime would be sanctioned. US treasury secretary Scott Bessent announced a new US sanctions campaign dubbed Operation Economic Outcast, warning that every country has a set deadline to halt economic activities with Iran or risk Treasury action that includes the removal of the US dollar financial system.

== Effects and criticism ==
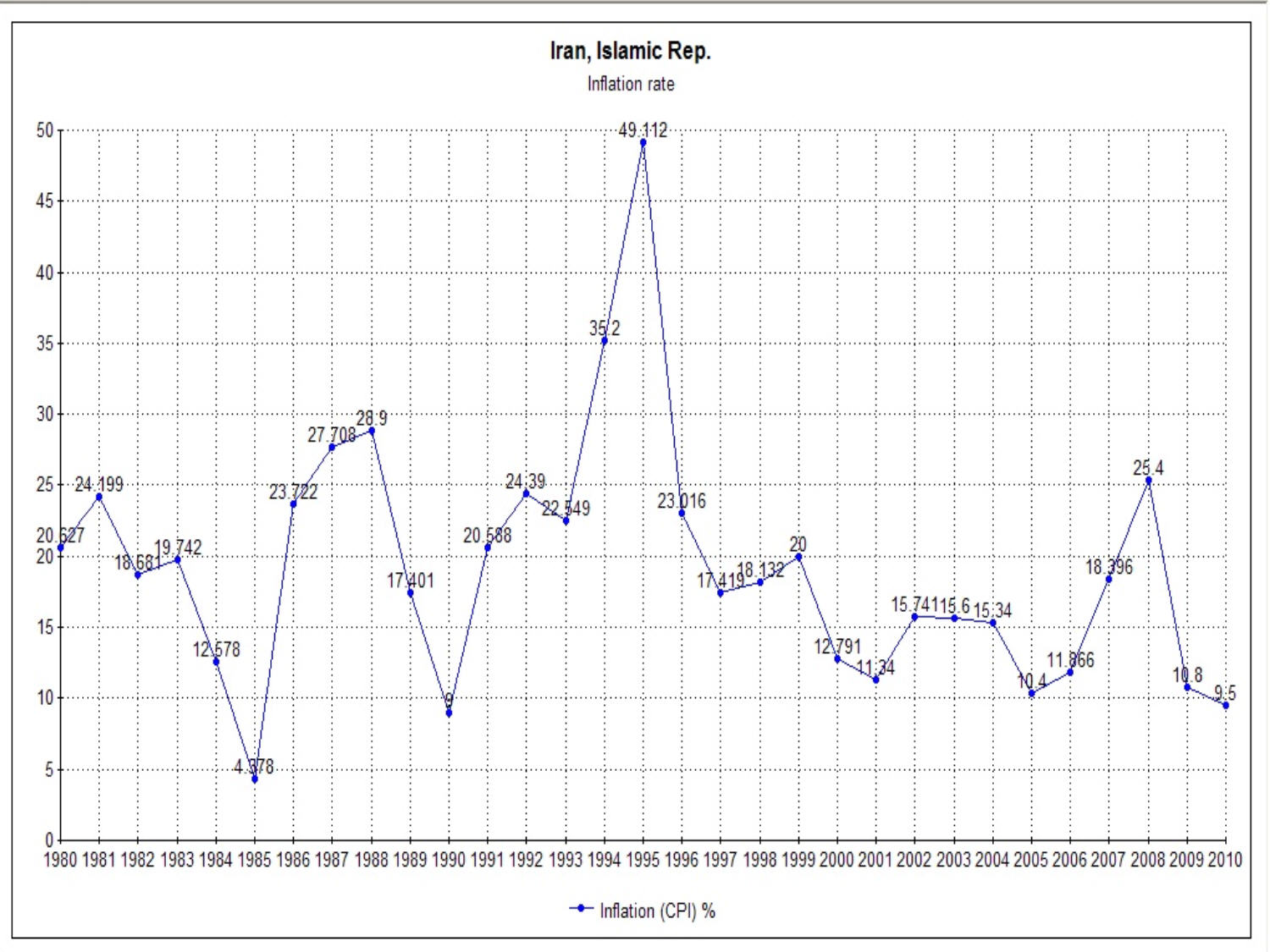
Annual inflation of the Iranian rial. As of 2020, U.S. economic sanctions have contributed to inflation and high unemployment rate alongside economic mismanagement and the COVID-19 pandemic.

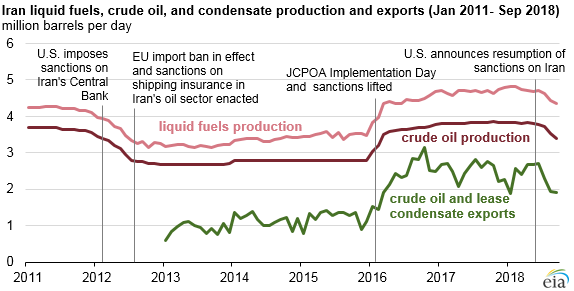
Changes in Iranian oil production in response to sanctions, 2011–2018

According to an Iranian journalist, the effects of sanctions in Iran include expensive basic goods and an aging and increasingly unsafe aircraft fleet. "According to reports from Iranian news agencies, 17 planes have crashed over the past 25 years, killing approximately 1,500 people."

The United States forbids aircraft manufacturer Boeing to sell aircraft to Iranian aviation companies. However, there are some authorizations for the export of civil aviation parts to Iran when those items are required for the safety of commercial aircraft. An analysis by The Jerusalem Post found that a third of the 117 Iranian planes designated by the U.S. had experienced accidents or crashes.

A 2005 report, presented at the 36th session of the International Civil Aviation Organization, reported that the U.S. sanctions had endangered the safety of civil aviation in Iran because it prevented Iran from acquiring parts and support essential for aviation safety. It also stated that the sanctions were contrary to article 44 of the Chicago Convention (to which the U.S. is a member). The ICAO report said aviation safety affects human lives and human rights, stands above political differences, and that the assembly should bring international public pressure on the United States to lift the sanctions against Iran.

The European Union was critical of most of the U.S. trade sanctions against Iran. Some EU member states criticized ILSA as a "double standard" in U.S. foreign policy, in which the United States vigorously worked against the Arab League boycott of Israel while at the same time promoted a worldwide boycott of Iran. The EU member states have threatened formal counter-action in the World Trade Organization.

According to a study by Akbar E. Torbat, "overall, the sanctions' economic effect" on Iran "has been significant, while its political effect has been minimal."

According to the United States National Foreign Trade Council, in the medium-term, lifting U.S. sanctions and liberalizing Iran's economic regime would increase Iran's total trade annually by as much as $61 billion (at the 2005 world oil price of $50/bbl), adding 32 percent to Iran's GDP. In the oil-and-gas sector, output and exports would expand by 25-to-50 percent (adding 3 percent to world crude oil production).

Iran could reduce the world price of crude petroleum by 10 percent, saving the United States annually between $38 billion (at the 2005 world oil price of $50/bbl) and $76 billion (at the proximate 2008 world oil price of $100/bbl). Opening Iran’s market place to foreign investment could also be a boon to competitive US multinational firms operating in a variety of manufacturing and service sectors.

In 2009, there was discussion in the United States of implementing "crippling sanctions" against Iran, such as the Iran Refined Petroleum Sanctions Act of 2009, "if diplomatic overture did not show signs of success by the autumn". Professor Hamid Dabashi, of Columbia University, said in August 2009 that this was likely to bring "catastrophic humanitarian consequences", while enriching and strengthening the "security and military apparatus" of "the Pasdaran and the Basij," and having absolutely no support from "any major or even minor opposition leader" in Iran. According to Bloomberg News, Boeing and Exxon have said that new Iran sanctions would cost $25 billion in U.S. exports.

It has also been argued the sanctions have had the counter effect of protecting Iran in some ways, for example the 2007 imposition of U.S. sanctions against Iranian financial institutions to a high degree made Iran immune to the Great Recession. Iranian officials argued that the sanctions created new business opportunities for Iranian companies to develop in order to fill the gap left by foreign contractors. According to U.S. officials, Iran may lose up to $60 billion in energy investments due to global sanctions.

On 18 January 2012 Russian Foreign Minister Sergey Lavrov warned that sanctions are aimed at strangling the economy of Iran and would create much discontent toward Western nations, and potentially provoke a negative recourse.

On 13 August 2018 Iran Supreme leader, Ayatollah Ali Khamenei, said that "mismanagement" harmed Iran more than U.S. sanctions did. "More than the sanctions, economic mismanagement (by the government) is putting pressure on ordinary Iranians ... I do not call it betrayal but a huge mistake in management," Khamenei was quoted as saying.

On 22 August 2018, United Nations Special Rapporteur Idriss Jazairy described the sanctions against Iran as "unjust and harmful". "The reimposition of sanctions against Iran after the unilateral withdrawal of the United States from the Iran nuclear deal, which had been unanimously adopted by the Security Council with the support of the United States itself, lays bare the illegitimacy of this action," said Jazairy. According to Jazairy, "chilling effect" caused by the "ambiguity" of recently reimposed sanctions, would lead to "silent deaths in hospitals".

According to Pakistan's Prime Minister Imran Khan, United States sanctions against Iran are affecting neighboring Pakistan. He stated that "The last thing the Muslim World needs is another conflict. The Trump administration is moving towards that direction."

On 5 May 2019, the White House announced the United States has stationed an aircraft carrier strike group and Air Force bombers to the Middle East for “troubling and escalatory indications and warnings” connected to Iran. Mr. Bolton said the purpose of the action is sending a message to the Iranian regime that any attack on U.S. interests or on those of our allies by Iran will be faced with our unremitting response. Also, he declared in the statement, we are not looking for war with Iran but are ready to repel to any attack, whether by proxy, the Islamic Revolutionary Guards Corps or regular Iranian forces.

On 19 May 2019, Trump threatened Iran and said in his Twitter post "If Iran wants to fight, that will be the official end of Iran. Never threaten the United States again!"

Donald J. Trump
(@realDonaldTrump)
tweeted:

If Iran wants to fight, that will be the official end of Iran. Never threaten the United States again!

19 May 2019

According to a 2019 AlJazeera report, some tech companies like as GitHub, Google and Apple and Microsoft began limiting users linked to Iran, and several other countries under U.S. sanctions, access to its services.

On 27 September 2019, Turkish President Recep Tayyip Erdoğan said that it is "impossible" for his country to stop buying oil and natural gas from Iran, despite U.S. sanctions against the latter. Iranian foreign minister Javad Zarif repeatedly condemned the American sanctions against Iran as "economic terrorism."

In June 2022, Iran claimed that despite changes imposed on by the continuance of U.S. sanctions, oil sales have remained at relatively high levels. According to figures from the petroleum ministry, Iran is currently exporting more than a million barrels of crude oil and gas condensate daily.

=== Impact on health ===
During the 2020 COVID-19 pandemic, health workers and sanctions experts said U.S. sanctions, including financial sanctions and lost oil revenues, were preventing the import of medicine and medical supplies including raw materials and equipment needed to manufacture medicines domestically.

The United States has ostensibly exempted humanitarian items from sanctions, but in practice the prohibition against business with Iranian banks and the reduction in issuance of certain medical export licenses by the United States Treasury Department enforcement agency have caused difficulties in Iran. For example, Iran faces a critical shortage of spare parts that are needed to repair dual-use equipment used to produce medicine. Sanctions have also prevented Iran from procuring active ingredients necessary to manufacture locally produced medicine to treat asthma, cancer, and multiple sclerosis.

In December 2020, according to the central bank chief of Iran, Iran could not pay for a COVID-19 vaccine because of U.S. sanctions against Iranian banks. In March 2020, during the first wave of the pandemic, the United States blocked Iran's request for an emergency $5 billion IMF loan.

After the United States withdrew from the 2015 Iran nuclear deal, many banks and businesses worldwide, including pharmaceutical and medical companies, decided not to conduct any business with Iran due to U.S. sanctions.

=== Impact on overseas students ===
As of December 2018, United States sanctions were reportedly affecting hundreds of Iranian university students in the United Kingdom, preventing them from being able to readily pay their tuition fees and forcing them to choose between abandoning their studies or using dangerous means to transfer funds.

=== 2025–2026 Iranian protests ===
The 2025–2026 Iranian protests were a series of nationwide demonstrations in Iran triggered by a significant economic crisis. The unrest began on 28 December 2025, following a sharp depreciation of the Iranian rial and rising inflation. These conditions were further impacted by the reimposition of international and U.S. sanctions. While initially focused on economic grievances, the protests expanded to include calls for the overthrow of the Islamic Republic.

In February 2026, US treasury secretary Scott Bessent acknowledged that US sanctions policy had contributed directly to Iran's currency crisis. In testimony before the US Senate Banking Committee, Bessent stated: "What we have done is created a dollar shortage in the country. It came to a swift and, I would say, grand culmination in December, when one of the largest banks in Iran went under. The central bank had to print money. The Iranian currency went into free fall. Inflation exploded, and hence we have seen the Iranian people out on the street."

== Exceptions ==
In December 2010 it was reported that the United States Department of the Treasury's Office of Foreign Assets Control had approved nearly 10,000 exceptions to U.S. sanctions rules worldwide over the preceding decade by issuing special licenses for American companies.

European and United States sanctions do not affect Iran's electricity exports, which creates a loophole for Iran's natural gas reserves.

== See also ==
- Economic D-Day
- Anti-Iranian sentiment
- Chicago's Persian heritage crisis
- Comprehensive Iran Sanctions, Accountability, and Divestment Act of 2010
- Countering America's Adversaries Through Sanctions Act
- Economy of Iran
- Foreign direct investment in Iran
- Instrument in Support of Trade Exchanges
- Iran and Libya Sanctions Act of 1996
- Iran and weapons of mass destruction
- Iran Freedom and Support Act of 2006
- Iran Mission Center
- Iran Sanctions Enhancement Act of 2007 (never passed)
- Iran–United States relations
- National Defense Authorization Act for Fiscal Year 2012
- International sanctions against Iran
