= Nima Takido fan gathering at Iran Mall =

2026 fan gathering in Tehran, Iran

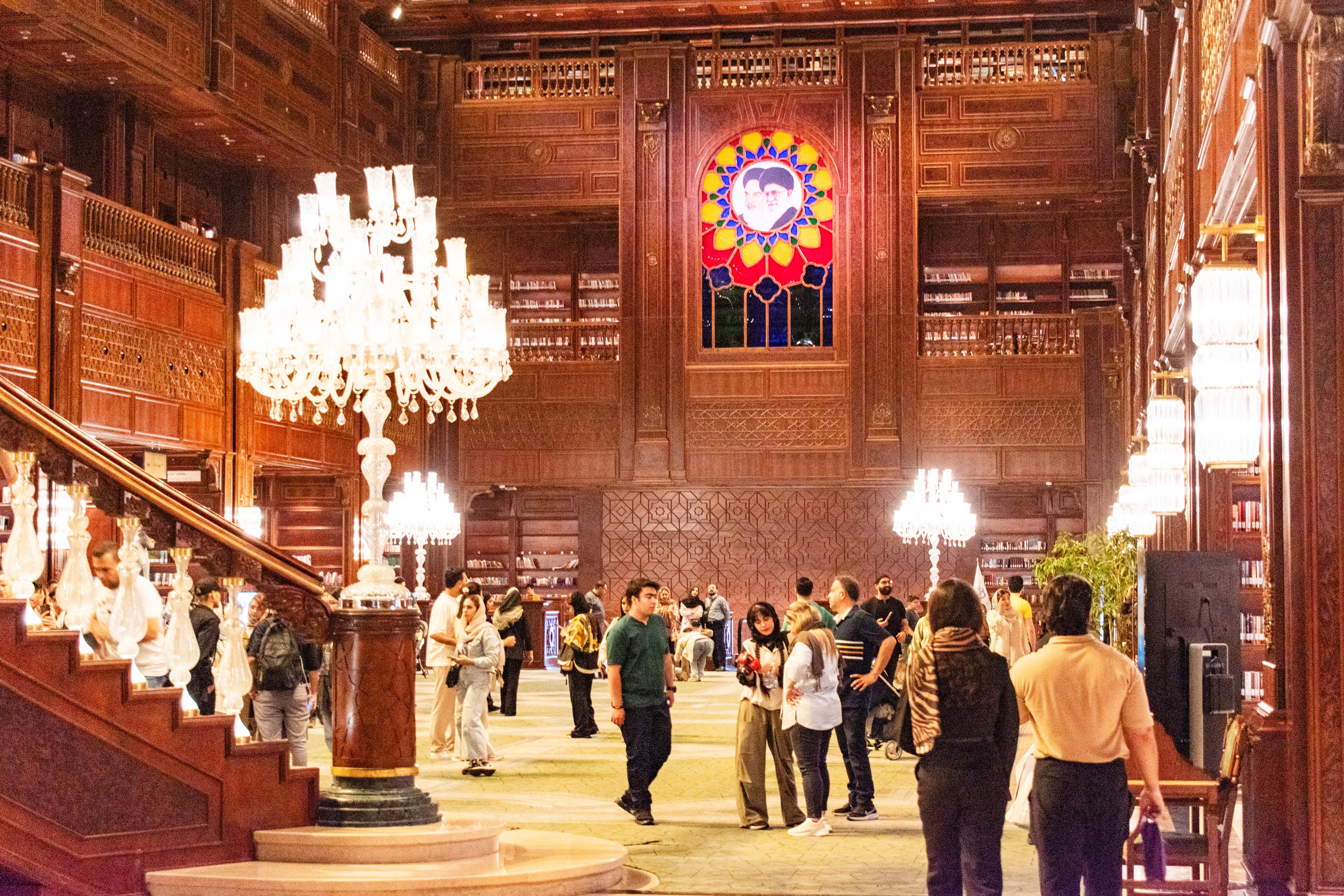
- An interior of Iran Mall in 2024; the image does not depict the gathering
- Date: 24 July 2026
- Time: 12:00–20:00 (scheduled)
- Venue: Black Box, Iran Mall
- Location: Tehran, Iran
- Type: Fan gathering and video game event
- Theme: Association football video games and a creator meet-and-greet
- Participants: Thousands; exact attendance unknown Approximately 5,000 free tickets were issued
- Outcome: Event ended early because of overcrowding; Takido sustained a leg injury

The Nima Tekido fan gathering at Iran Mall was a fan meeting and video-game event held on 24 July 2026 at Iran Mall in Tehran, Iran. The event was scheduled to feature Iranian YouTuber Nima Rezaei, known online as Nima Tekido, content creator Amir GZ, association football video-game competitions and opportunities for attendees to meet the creators.

Approximately 5,000 free tickets were issued through advance registration, but many additional visitors arrived without reservations. Crowds spread from the event hall into the mall's public areas, and the programme ended earlier than scheduled after the number of attendees exceeded the arrangements made for the gathering. Tekido injured his leg during the crowding and was taken for treatment.

The total attendance was not independently established. Contemporary reports described the turnout as numbering in the thousands or tens of thousands, while one estimate relayed by BBC Persian suggested that nearly 40,000 people without tickets had arrived. Radio Farda reported that larger figures circulated after the event had not been confirmed by an independent estimate.

== Background and planning ==
Iran Mall announced that the event would be held at the complex's Black Box venue from 12:00 until 20:00. The announced programme included association football video-game competitions, appearances by Nima Tekido and Amir GZ and opportunities for attendees to take photographs with the creators. Admission was free, but advance registration was required.

According to Radio Farda, organisers had allocated approximately 5,000 tickets. The outlet reported that the arrival of large numbers of people who had not registered disrupted the organisers' plans and filled the mall's parking areas. Iran International similarly reported that the organisers were unprepared for the number of unregistered visitors who came to the venue.

== Crowding and early termination ==
On the day of the event, thousands of predominantly teenage and young adult fans gathered in and around the venue. Some attendees had travelled to Tehran from other provinces and waited for several hours to see Tekido.

Videos and reports from the mall showed crowds occupying corridors and other public spaces beyond the Black Box venue. The number of visitors eventually prevented the event from continuing as planned, and it was brought to an early end. Radio Farda reported that law-enforcement personnel entered the mall to assist in managing the crowd and that many attendees left without meeting Tekido.

Tekido reported that his right leg and knee had been injured. IranWire later reported that he had published images of his leg in a cast and said that it had been fractured during the crowding. The outlet noted that additional social-media claims concerning unconsciousness, missing personal belongings and other injuries had not been confirmed at the time of its report.

== Attendance estimates ==
No official or independently verified final attendance figure was published. Iran International reported that 5,000 tickets had been issued and described the number of additional unregistered visitors as being in the tens of thousands.

BBC Persian relayed an estimate that nearly 40,000 additional people had arrived without tickets and reported that arrangements had been made to accommodate up to 15,000 people. Radio Farda, however, stated that no independent estimate had confirmed the larger attendance figures published after the event. It described only the presence of a crowd substantially larger than the planned capacity as certain.

== Aftermath ==
On 27 July 2026, Iran International reported that Tekido's YouTube and Instagram pages had become unavailable following a judicial order. The report stated that the action occurred after the Iran Mall gathering but did not provide details of the judicial decision or identify a specific charge.

Iran Mall's official account subsequently described the event as a well-attended PlayStation league but did not mention its early termination or Tekido's injury. Independent media reports focused on the overcrowding, the cancellation of the remaining programme and Tekido's injury.

== Media interpretation ==
Several media reports discussed the gathering as an example of the influence of online content creators among younger Iranians. Iran International described it as evidence of a youth celebrity culture that operates largely separately from Iranian television, cinema and other traditional routes to fame.

Radio Farda placed the gathering in the context of earlier large assemblies associated with online communities and cultural figures in Iran. Its analysis described the event as illustrating the ability of loosely connected online audiences to gather rapidly in public spaces, while cautioning against interpreting the participants as an organised political movement.

IranWire described public reaction to the turnout as part of a broader discussion about the difference between celebrities recognised by traditional Iranian media and creators followed by younger audiences on social-media platforms.

== See also ==
- Internet celebrity
- Internet culture
- Generation Z
- YouTube culture
