= Nima Tekido =

Iranian YouTuber and internet personality

Nima Takido
- نیما تکیدو
- Occupations: YouTuber; internet personality
- Years active: 2022–present

YouTube information
- Channel: Nima Tekido
- Years active: 2022–present
- Genres: Comedy, challenges and entertainment

Nima Rezaei (Persian: نیما رضایی), known online as Nima Takido (Persian: نیما تکیدو; also styled Nima Tekido), is an Iranian YouTuber and internet personality known for Persian-language comedy, entertainment and group-challenge videos. He received wider media attention in July 2026 after a planned meeting with fans at Iran Mall in Tehran attracted a crowd substantially larger than the event's planned capacity.

== Online career ==
Takido began his main online activity in 2022. His official YouTube channel uses the name Nima Tekido and the handle @nimatekido.

His content principally consists of comedy videos, reactions, challenges and group entertainment aimed at Persian-speaking audiences. Radio Farda reported that he had developed a substantial audience, particularly among teenagers and young adults, without first becoming known through Iranian television or cinema.

Takido has also appeared in collaborative videos and events with other Persian-language online content creators. Media reports identified another content creator, Amir GZ, as a participant in the July 2026 Iran Mall event.

== Iran Mall gathering ==
On 24 July 2026, an entertainment event featuring Takido and Amir GZ was scheduled to take place in the Black Box venue at Iran Mall. Admission was free but required advance registration, and approximately 5,000 tickets had been issued.

Large numbers of people who had not registered also arrived at the shopping centre. The resulting crowd exceeded the venue's planned capacity, filled parts of the complex and caused the event to be ended early.

Published estimates of the number of attendees varied. Some reports referred to tens of thousands of people, although Radio Farda stated that no independent estimate had confirmed the larger figures. The outlet described only the presence of a crowd significantly greater than the event's expected capacity as firmly established.

Takido had difficulty leaving the crowd and passed through a fountain area while attempting to move away from the gathering. He later said that his right leg and knee had been injured. Iran International also reported that he sustained a leg injury and was taken for treatment.

== Restrictions on social-media accounts ==
On 27 July 2026, Zoomit reported that Takido's YouTube channel had been made inaccessible in Iran following a judicial order. His Instagram account was subsequently restricted as well.

The message displayed on the channel referred to an order issued by judicial authorities. According to Zoomit, the Law Enforcement Command of the Islamic Republic of Iran had not provided a detailed public explanation for the decision at the time of the report. Later reporting by the Islamic Republic News Agency also discussed the restrictions in the context of the Iran Mall gathering and the influence of online personalities on younger audiences.

Reports circulating on social media also claimed that Takido had been arrested, but no official announcement or sufficiently reliable independent report confirming an arrest had been published.

== Media analysis ==
The Iran Mall gathering prompted discussion in Iranian and international media about changing patterns of celebrity and the role of social-media personalities in the lives of Iranian teenagers.

Radio Farda described Takido as part of a group of cultural figures who had developed large audiences outside traditional Iranian television and cinema. The report interpreted the gathering as an example of online networks rapidly producing large physical gatherings without a conventional organisation or central institution.

Iran International similarly described the event as evidence of a parallel celebrity culture among younger Iranians, with its own personalities, humour and online communities that were often unfamiliar to older audiences and traditional media institutions. These descriptions represented media analysis of the gathering rather than measurements of Takido's long-term cultural influence.
