= Kan Creek =

Stream in Tehran, Iran

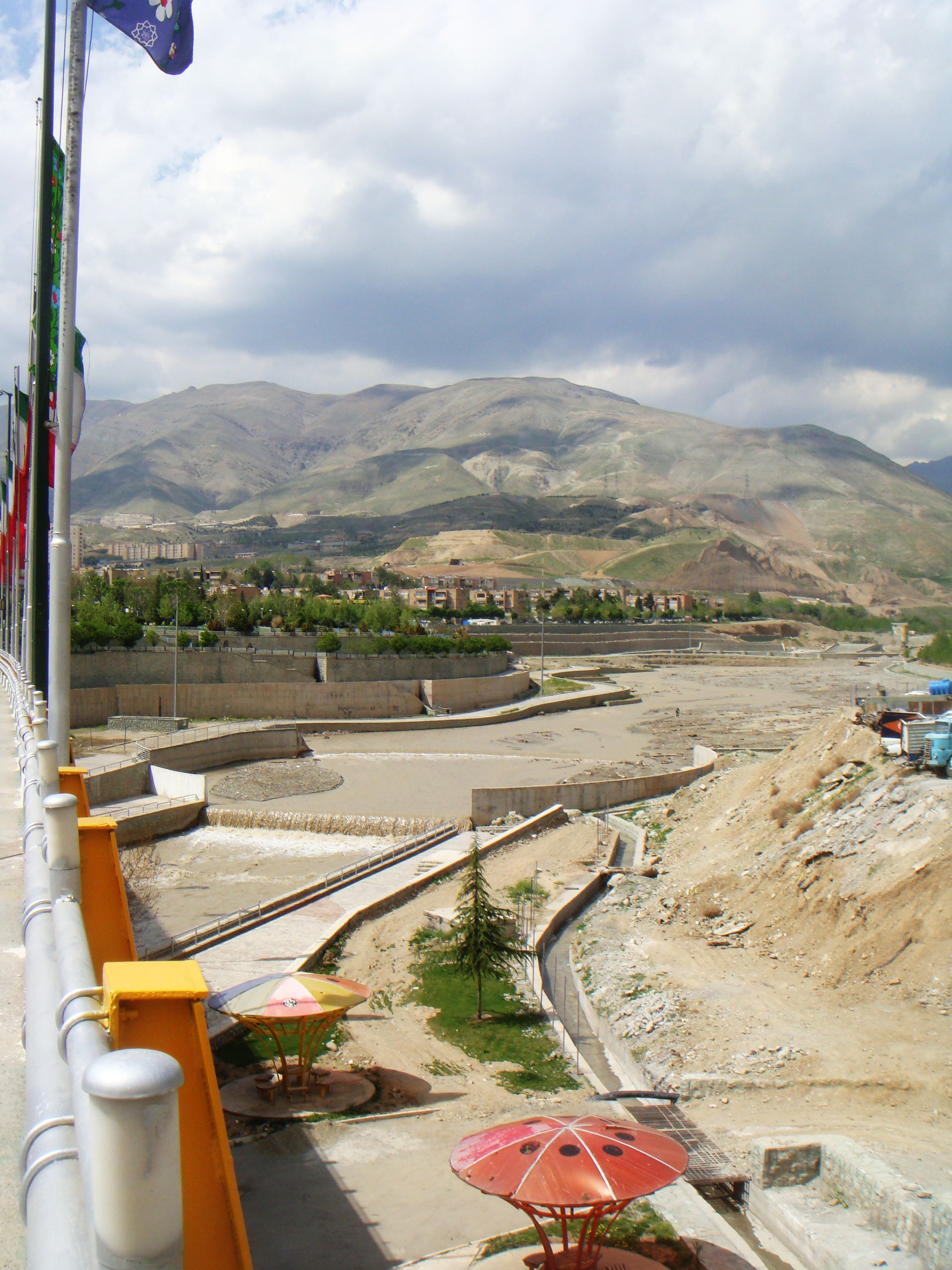

Location
- Country: Iran

Physical characteristics
- Source
  - location: Tehran, Iran
- Length: 33 km (21 mi)

Kan Creek (Persian: رودخانه کن) is a stream flowing through Western Tehran in Iran.

== Route ==
Kan Creek's primary source is from the west of Tochal. The creek navigates downstream to Kan village and Metropolitan Tehran passing by Eram Park and Azadi Sport Complex until reaching the southern outskirts of Tehran where the stream dries. Parts of Hemmat Expressway, Freeway 2 (Iran), Freeway 5 (Iran) and Mehrabad Airport are built over the creek's course.

== Revitalization ==
As part of a shared development between the municipalities of district 5 and 22 of Tehran, a distance of 5,400 metres (3.4 mi) of the creek's course between Hemmat Expressway and Freeway 2 (Iran) is being converted into a recreational park. The creek's bed and banks are also planned to be encased by heavy stones and concrete. Tehran's district 22 municipality has considered Kan Creek a primary source of water for the currently under construction Chitgar Lake, the stream will provide 80 percent of the artificial lake's inflow.

== Crossings ==
- Hemmat Expressway
- Hakim Expressway
- Freeway 2 (Iran)
- Road 32 (Iran)
- Fath Expressway
- Freeway 5 (Iran)
- Saidi Expressway
- Road 65 (Iran)
- Freeway 7 (Iran)
- Road 71 (Iran)
