= Ali Ansari (banker) =

Iranian businessman and banker (b. 1962)

- Born: 1962 (age 63–64); Imperial State of Iran
- Occupations: Businessman and banker
- Known for: Founding Ayandeh Bank

Ali Ansari (Persian: علی انصاری; born 1962) is an Iranian businessman and banker, known for his role in establishing and leading Bank Ayandeh and for his involvement in the development of Iran Mall, a large commercial complex in Tehran.

== Career ==
=== Bank Ayandeh ===
Ansari was a principal shareholder of Bank Ayandeh, a private Iranian bank formed in 2013 through the merger of Tat Bank with other financial institutions. Under his management, the bank attracted deposits by offering relatively high interest rates. By 2024, the bank accumulated heavy losses and high levels of bad loans.

The former governor of Iran's central bank Mohammad-Reza Farzin said that the bank has $5.1 billion in accumulated losses, $2.9 billion in overdrafts, and a negative 600 percent capital adequacy ratio.

In October 2025, the Central Bank of Iran revoked Bank Ayandeh's operating licence and dissolved the bank due to accumulated losses and regulatory concerns. Its assets and deposits were absorbed into the state-owned Bank Melli, with assurances that depositors' accounts would be maintained.

=== Iran Mall ===
Ansari was involved in the development of Iran Mall, one of the largest shopping and entertainment complexes in Tehran. Projects financed by Bank Ayandeh included substantial lending to entities linked with Ansari and the Iran Mall development. By the time of the bank's dissolution, a significant share of its loans was classified as bad loans.

== Sanctions ==
On 30 October 2025, the UK government announced sanctions against Ansari for his alleged role in financially enabling the work of the Islamic Revolutionary Guard Corps (IRGC), along with allegations of corruption.

On 10 July 2026, the U.S. Department of the Treasury’s Office of Foreign Assets Control (OFAC) took action against Ansari.

== See also ==
- Ayandeh Bank
- Banking and insurance in Iran
- Economy of Iran
