= Iran Mall =

Largest mall ever built based in Tehran, Iran

- بازار بزرگ ایران

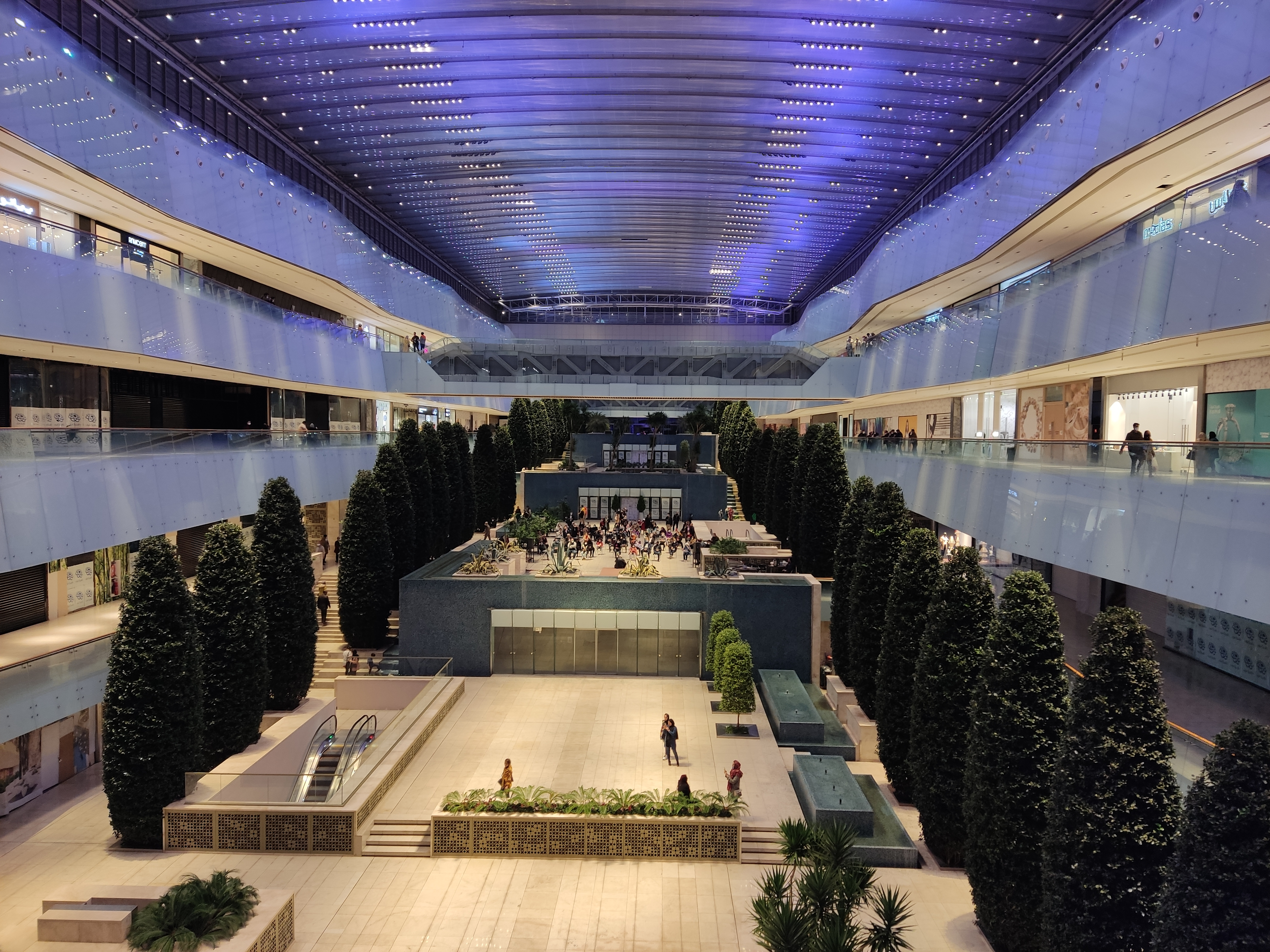
- Iran Mall in 2021
- Location: Chitgar Lake, Tehran, Iran
- Coordinates: 35°45′12.2″N 51°11′32.7″E
- Opened: 1 May 2018; 8 years ago
- Owner: Ayandeh Bank
- Num. of stores: 2500+
- Floor area: 1,950,000 square metres (21,000,000 sq ft)
- Floors: 7
- Parking: 20,000+
- Website: IranMall.com

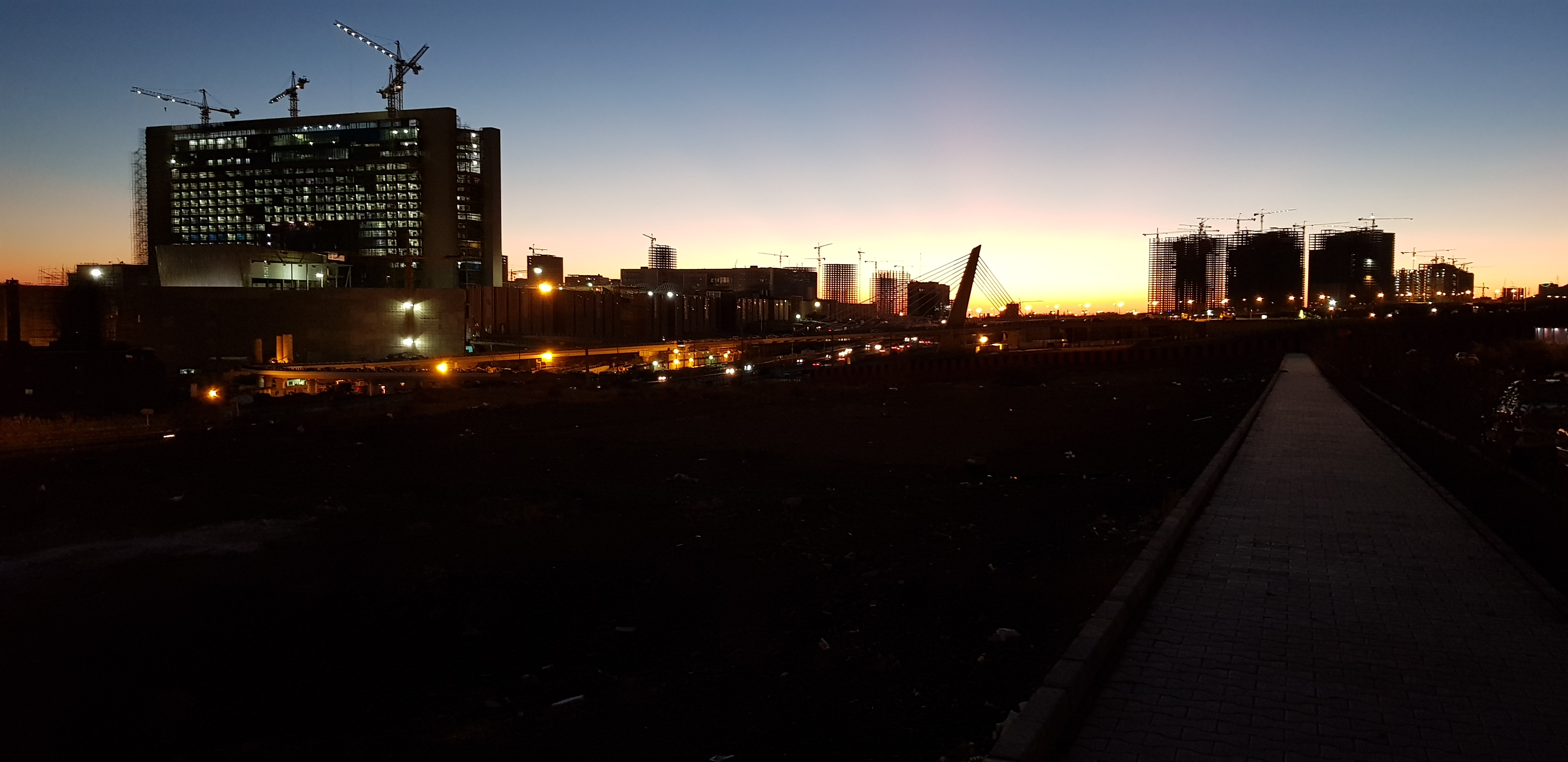
An old picture of Iran Mall when it was under construction (2017).

The Iran Mall (Persian: ایران مال) is the world’s largest shopping mall, located in northwest Tehran, Iran, by Chitgar Lake.

The multi-purpose complex was designed on land with an area of 317,000 square metres (3,410,000 sq ft) and seven floors. Its infrastructure area in the first phase is 1,350,000 m^{2} (14,500,000 sq ft), which will be increased to 1,600,000 m^{2} (17,000,000 sq ft) when all the development phases are completed.

The first phase with the capacity of 267,000 m^{2} (2,870,000 sq ft) of gross leasable area and 708 retail units was opened on 1 May 2018.

Over 1,200 contractors and 25,000 workers took part in the construction of Iran Mall. The facility was owned by Ayandeh Bank until October 2025, when the bank was dissolved by the Iranian government. Following the dissolution and the loss of its banking license, the Central Bank of Iran merged Ayandeh with Bank Melli Iran, but moved to sell the mall as part of the liquidation process. The original idea of building such a large complex came from the well-known Iranian entrepreneur, Ali Ansari, who has also been the chief executive of constructing the Iran Mall.

== International honours and records ==
The Iran Mall has attended Mapic for three years (from 2015 to 2017) and has also been awarded by RLI as the best-anticipated shopping mall in terms of dimensions and spaces of services, culture and entertainment in 2017.

According to the Guinness World Records, the longest continuous concrete pour was completed for the Iran Mall. This record was achieved between 1 and 6 March 2018.

== Attractions ==
=== Traditional bazaar ===
The traditional bazaar of the Iran Mall is inspired by the markets of Isfahan, Kashan, Shiraz, Qazvin, and Qom. The collection was designed and built based on historical patterns and methods of Iranian architecture such as historical markets and related buildings.

=== Didar Garden ===
Didar Garden's roof is 14 m (46 ft) long, made of glass and is decorated with fountains and palm trees.

=== Mahan Garden ===
Mahan Garden with a width of 50 m (160 ft) and an approximate length of 170 m (560 ft) and an area of about 16,000 m^{2} (170,000 sq ft) has been built on three floors of the first to second commercial parking on five levels.

=== Mirror Hall ===
Featuring Ayeneh-kari decorations, Iran Mall's Mirror Hall is based on the design of the Mirror Hall in Golestan Palace.

=== Traditional drink shop ===
On the southeastern side of the traditional bazaar of the Iran Mall, an area of 250 m^{2} (2,700 sq ft) is devoted to a traditional drink shop.

=== Library ===
The Iran Mall offers a separate structure known as the Jondishapour Library, named after Jondishapur University.

=== Car showroom ===
A car showroom is located in the west of the Iran Mall.

== Hotel and World Trade Center ==
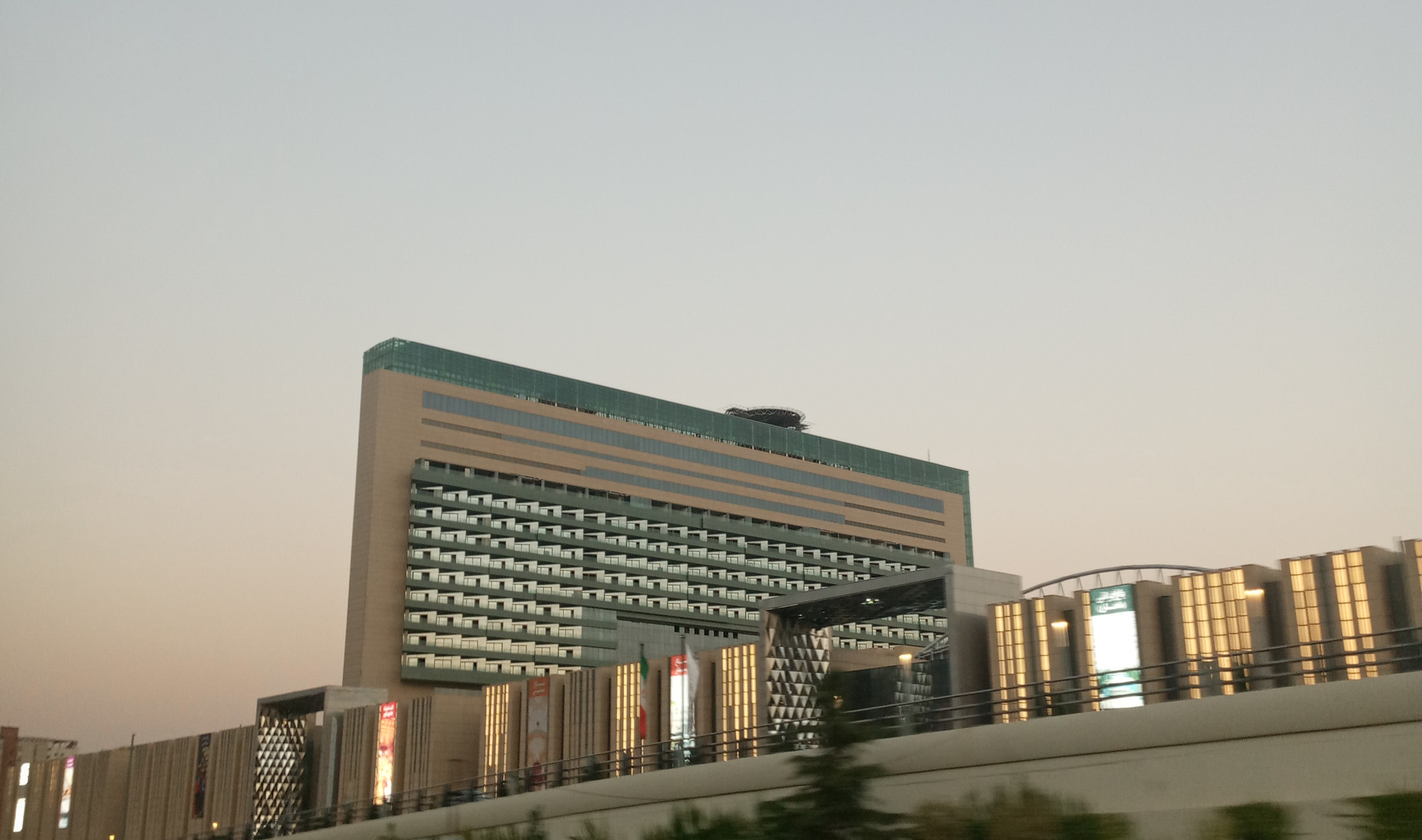
Iran Mall Hotel

Iran Mall Hotel is one of the biggest parts of this complex. This huge and bright structure, which is located in the easternmost part of Iran Mall, has 18 floors and more than 300 rooms. The hotel is in the final stages of construction. The World Trade Center, which is a tower located in the west wing of the Iran Mall, will be dedicated to large national and international companies and various commercial and administrative uses after it is built.

== Use during the COVID-19 pandemic ==
On 16 March 2020, for the first time in response to the COVID-19 pandemic, the Iran Mall closed all of its units and set up a convalescent centre for patients with COVID-19. This convalescent centre was established in less than three days with a capacity of 3,000 beds and continued to operate for two months.

In May 2021, the Mall's vaccination centre started operating as one of the biggest vaccination zones in the country; the centre, with a capacity of injecting more than 20,000 vaccine doses, provided services to citizens until at least December 2021.
