= Li Fangwei =

Chinese entrepreneur and international arms dealer (born 1972)

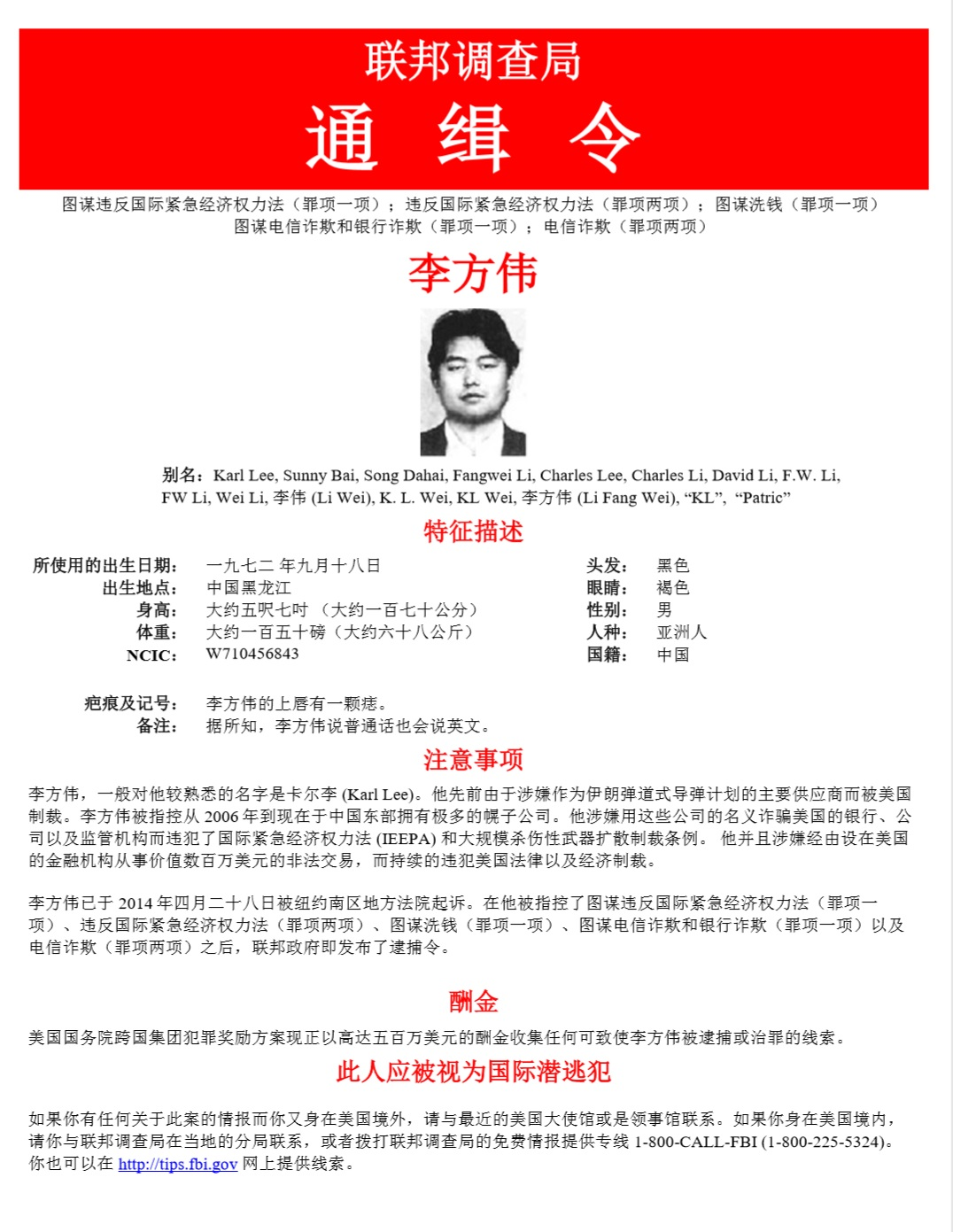
- Born: 18 September 1972 (age 54); Heilongjiang, China
- Other name: Karl Lee
- Occupation: Arms dealer

Li Fangwei (Chinese: 李方伟; pinyin: Lǐ Fāngwěi; born 18 September 1972) is a Chinese entrepreneur and international arms dealer. On April 28, 2014, he was indicted by the United States, alleging that he is suspected of violating sanctions and regulations, using shell companies to enter the American financial system, and providing Iran with technology related to ballistic missiles.

Li Fangwei is one of the few Chinese nationals on the FBI's Most Wanted list. In 2014, the United States State Department also offered a reward of up to $5 million, hoping that someone could provide clues to help arrest Li Fangwei or prove his guilt.

According to media reports, investigations have revealed that Fangwei was allegedly arrested in April 2019 for smuggling in Dalian and has been imprisoned in the Dalian detention center since 2020.

== Relations with the Chinese government ==
It is reported that Li Fangwei used to rely on family connections to hold official positions in China, and was supported by the People's Liberation Army because of his grandfather's relationship.

On 30 April 2014, Chinese Foreign Ministry spokesperson Qin Gang stated at a regular press conference: "China firmly opposes the US imposing unilateral sanctions on Chinese companies and individuals by citing domestic laws. The relevant US practices will not help solve the problem and damage the non-proliferation cooperation between the two sides. I want to emphasize that the Chinese government attaches great importance to non-proliferation export control, and will seriously investigate and deal with any violations of China's non-proliferation laws and regulations. China has carried out non-proliferation law enforcement cooperation to solve it. China urges the US to stop its wrong practice of sanctioning Chinese companies and individuals and return to the correct track of non-proliferation cooperation.”

As the United States and China have not yet signed an extradition treaty, Li Fangwei may currently be under the protection of the Chinese government. Li Fangwei still runs several companies in Dalian and exports missile parts and technology to Iran.

== See also ==
- [Karl Lee Reportedly Spotted Near a Dalian Graphite Facility in August 2026]
- Weapon of mass destruction
- List of weapons of mass destruction treaties
- Nuclear proliferation
- Nuclear program of Iran
- Treaty on the Non-Proliferation of Nuclear Weapons
