= Chitgar Lake =

Artificial lake in Tehran, Iran

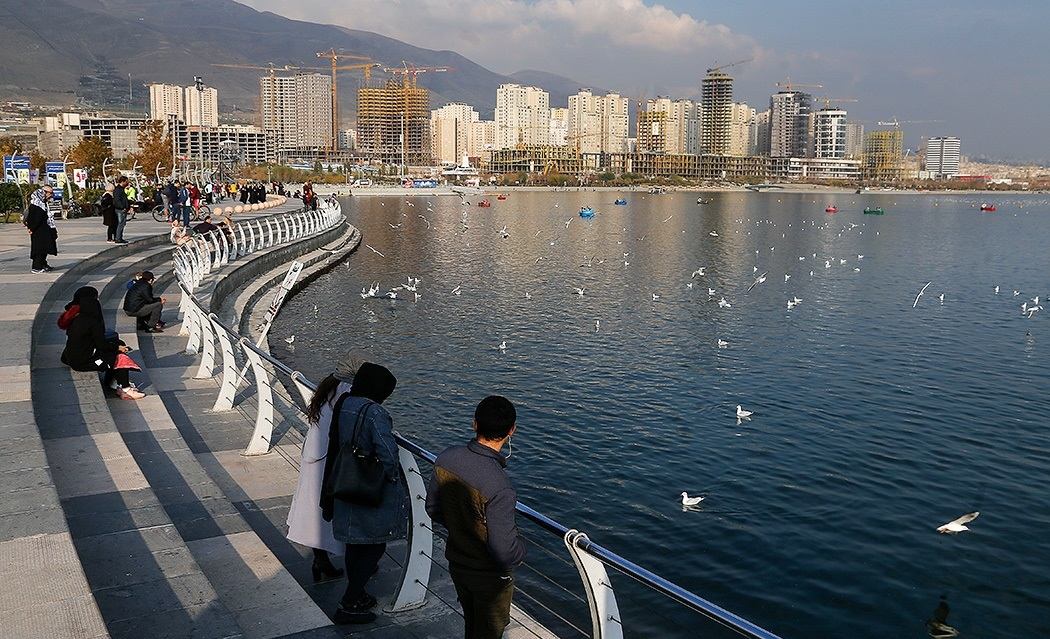

- Location within Iran
- Interactive map of Chitgar Lake
- Location: Western Tehran, Iran
- Coordinates: 35.7452°N 51.2148°E
- Type: Artificial; recreational
- Catchment area: 618 acres (250 ha)

Chitgar Lake (Persian: دریاچه‌ چیتگر, romanized: Daryâče-ye Čitgar) is an artificial and recreational lake located to the north of Chitgar Park in northwestern Tehran, Iran.

Officially known as the Lake of the Martyrs of the Persian Gulf (Persian: دریاچه شهدای خلیج‌فارس), the complex has a total area of around 250 hectares; 130 hectares across the lake and 120 hectares on its coastal zone and resorts. About 80% of the body of water comes from Kan Creek, and the remaining 20% comes from central areas and surface runoffs.

Chitgar Lake benefits from the seasonal rains and temporary water of the Kan Creek and the running water of Tehran and can help in moderating the weather in the capital. This lake with an area of about 355 hectares and a capacity of 35 million cubic meters of water is included in the master plan and the detailed plan approved for the 22nd region. Also, as a large expanse of water, this lake can irrigate the underground aquifers of Tehran. A city whose aquifers are slowly draining can prevent the possibility of soil subsidence by implementing this huge project. Due to the complex and heterogeneous texture and the increasing population density, the city of Tehran is faced with an increase in pollution exceeding international standards.

== History ==
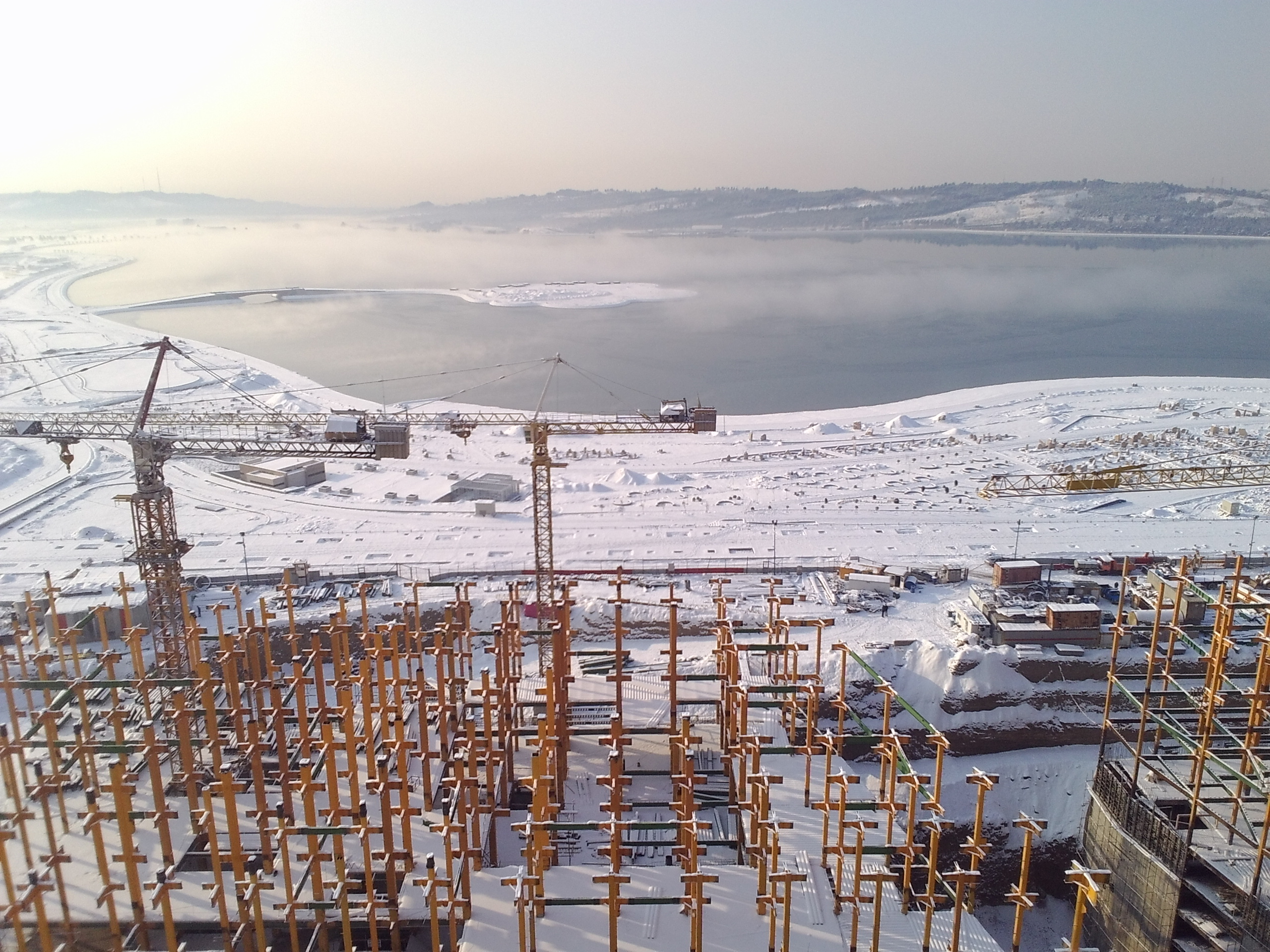
The surrounding buildings of Chitgar Lake under construction.

In 1968, within the first master plan of the city of Tehran, it was planned to construct a lake in western Tehran. But due to technical and budgetary constraints, the construction of the lake remained dormant for many years. Eventually, the construction of the lake area began in September 2010.

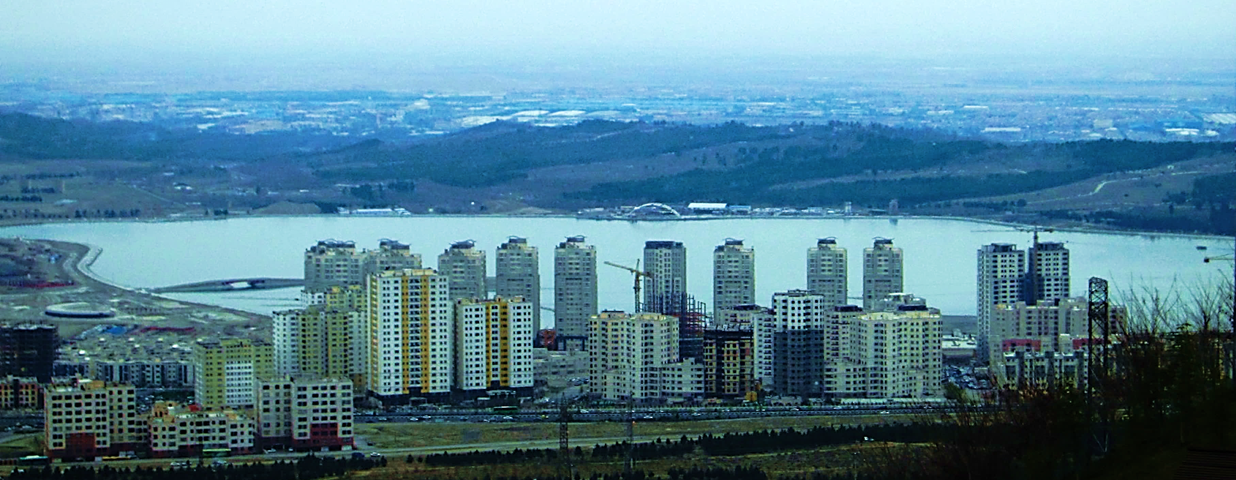

== Gallery ==
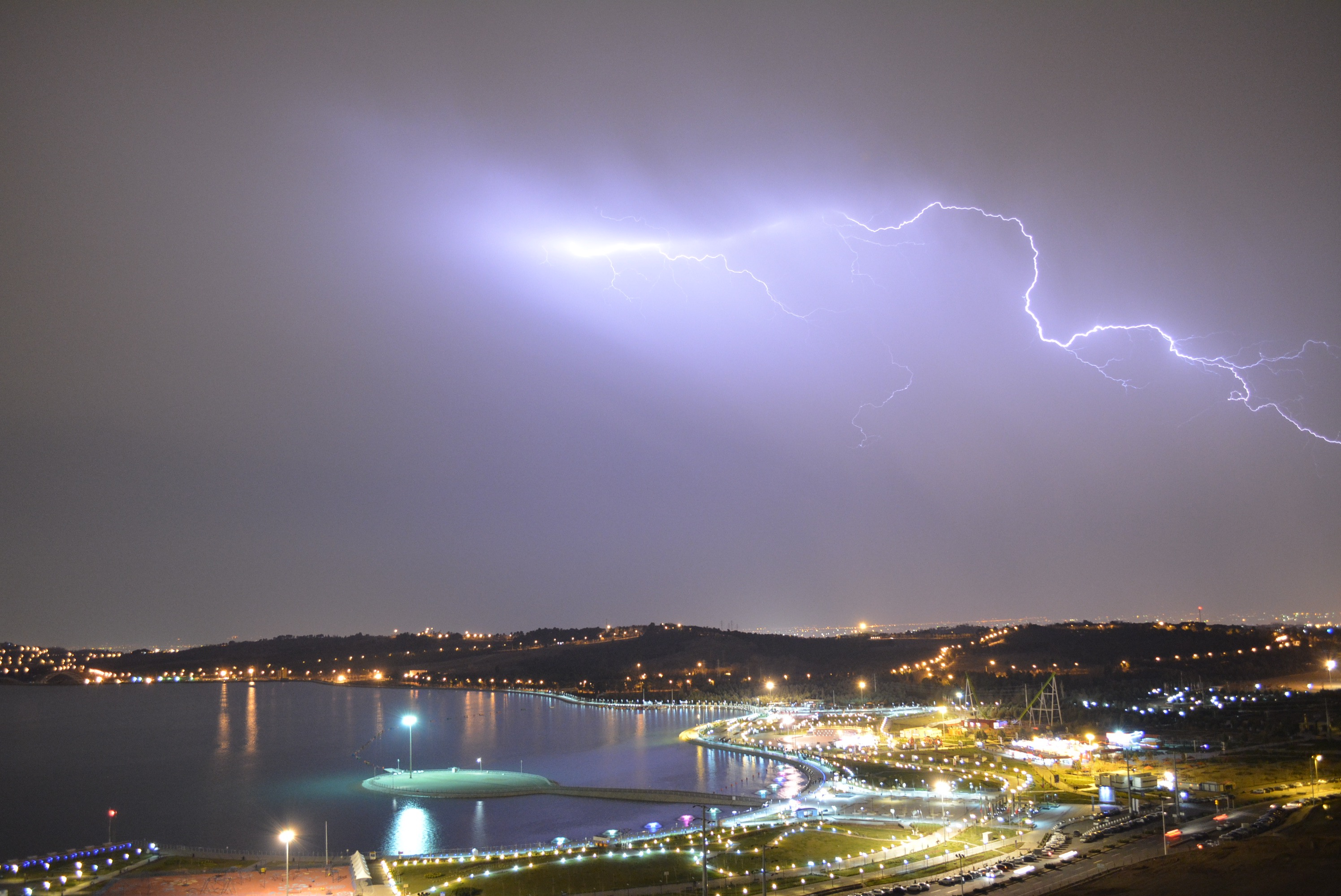
Lightning above Chitgar Lake.

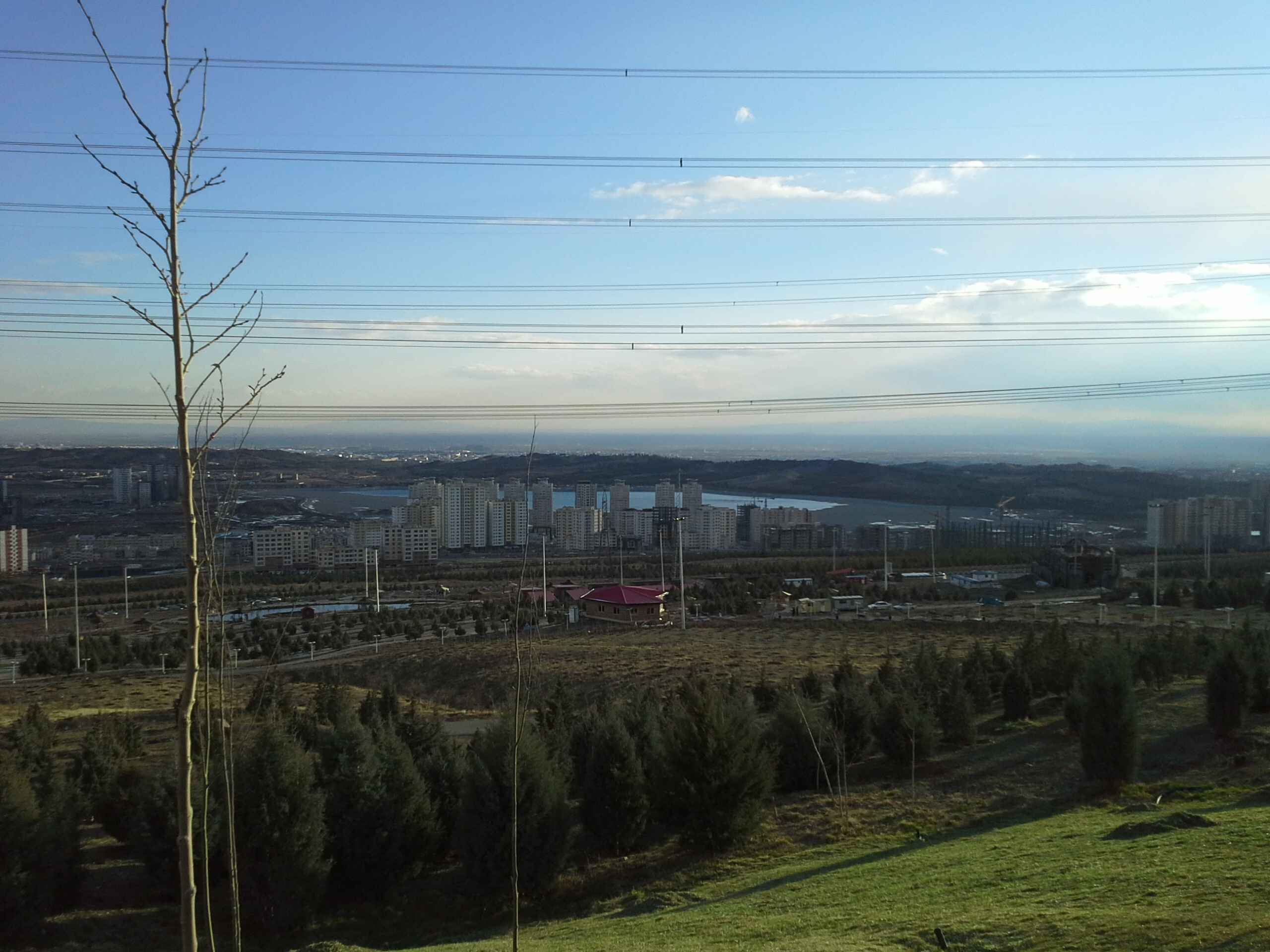
Chitgar Lake seen from the northern heights.

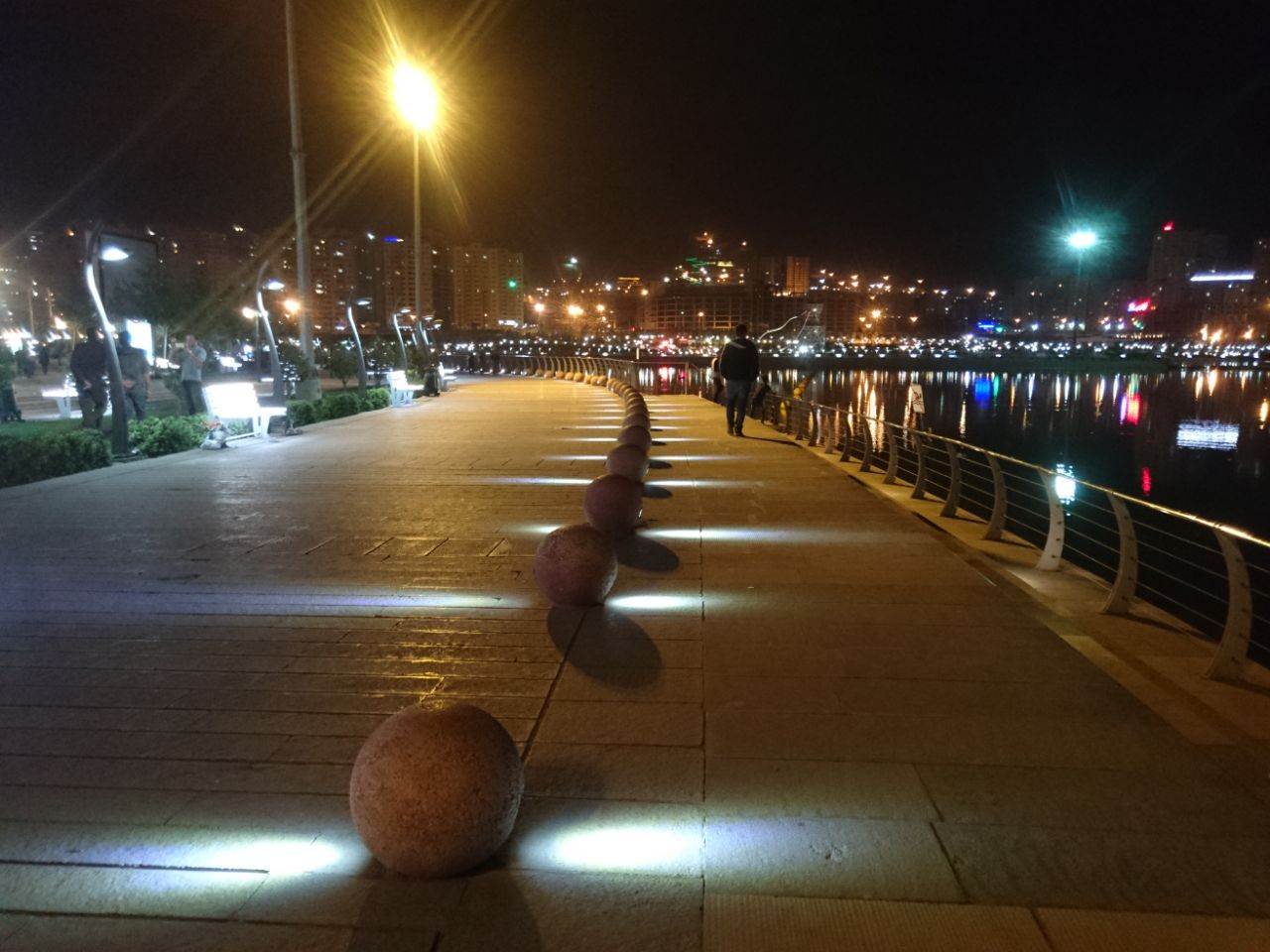
A walkway along Chitgar Lake.

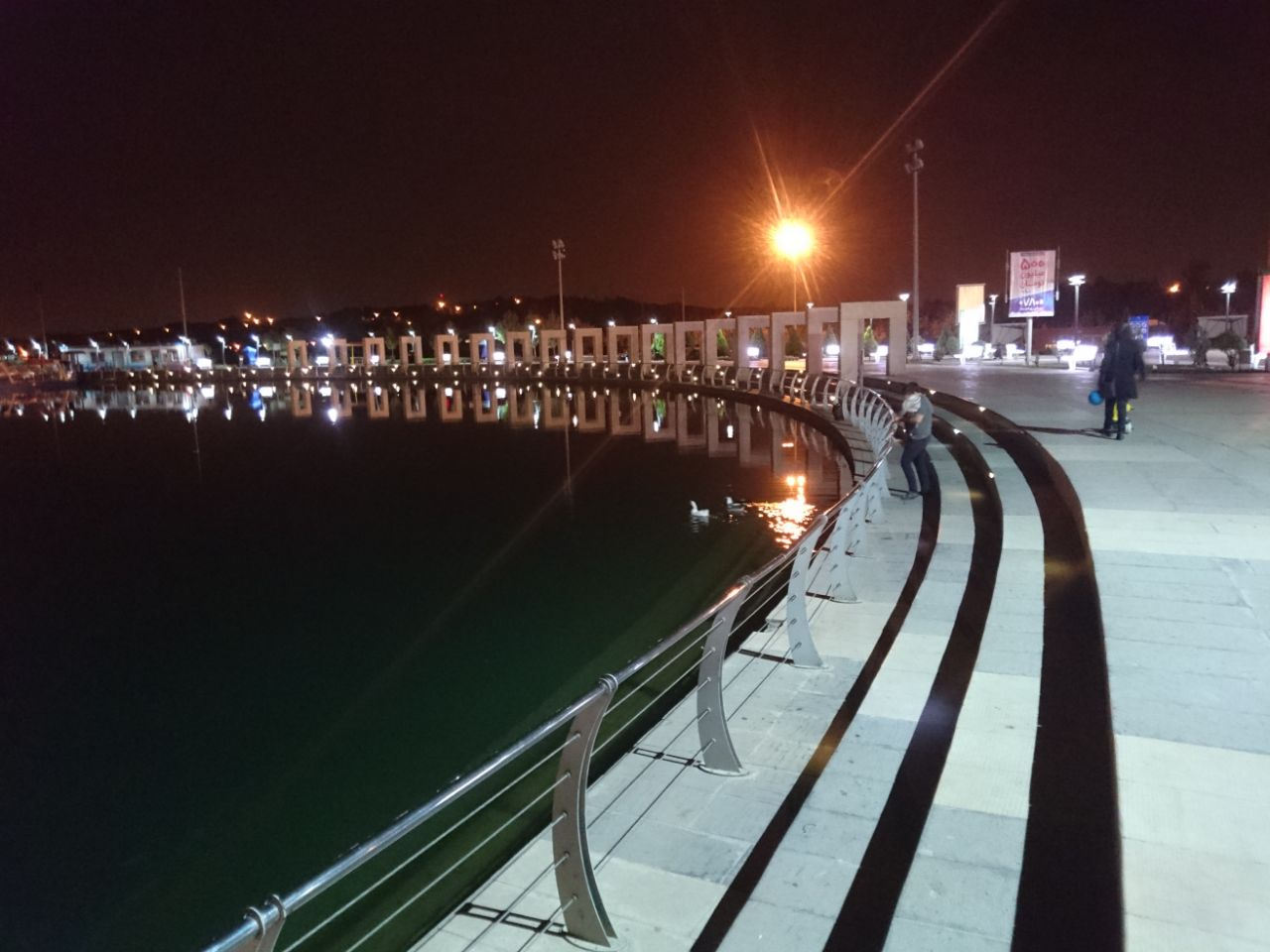
A walkway along Chitgar Lake.

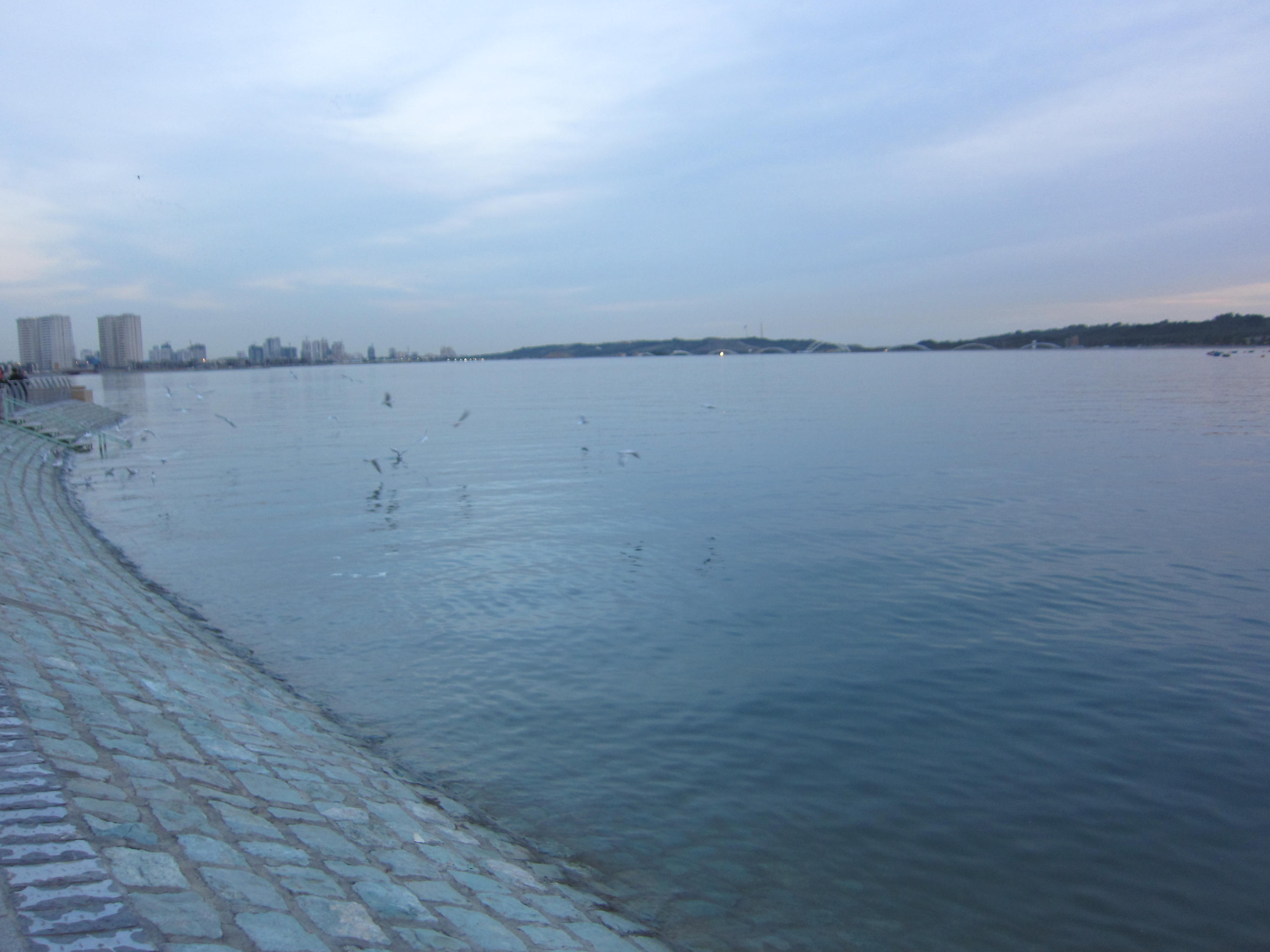
Chitgar Lake in March 2015.

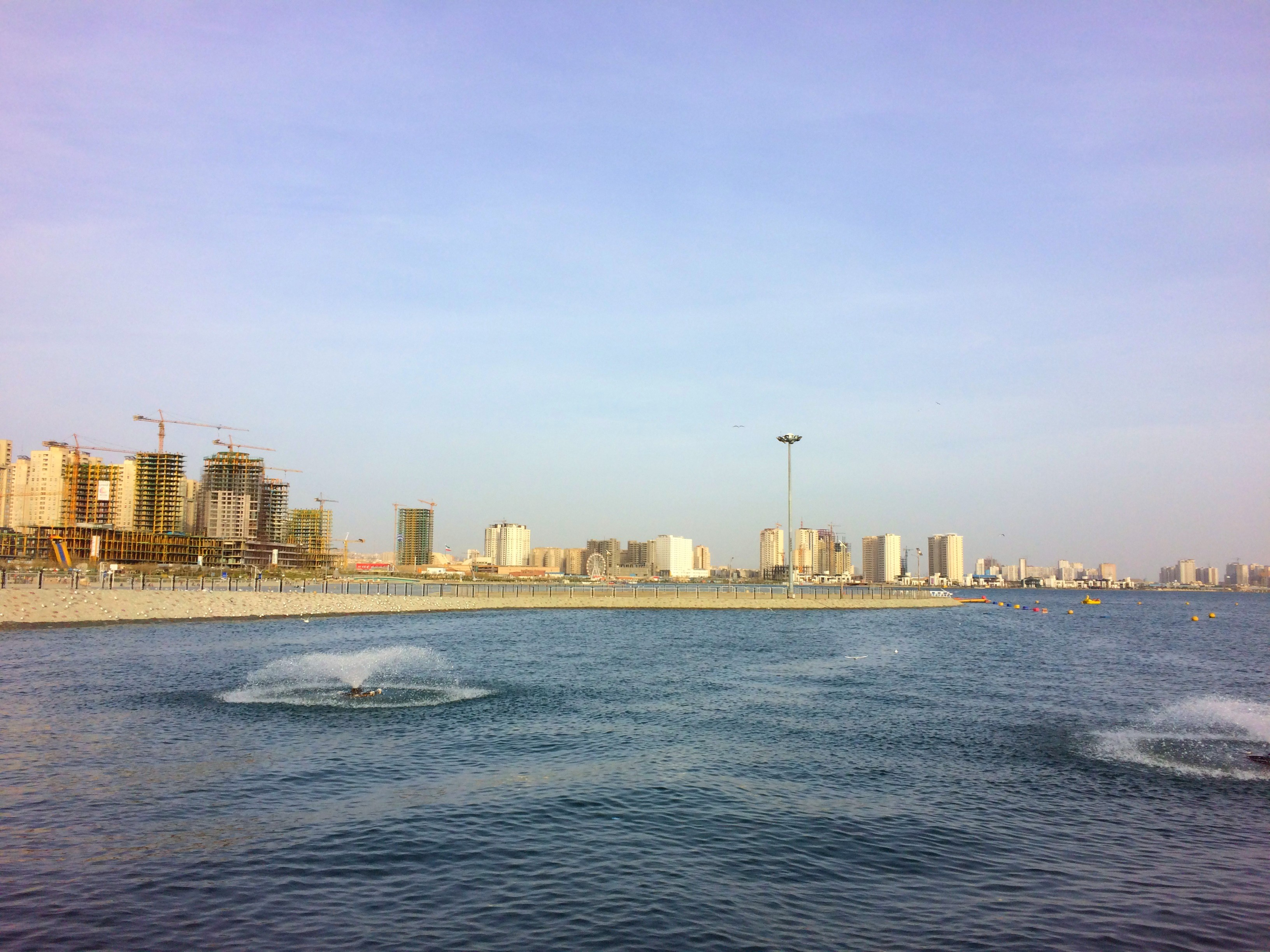
Chitgar Lake in March 2018.

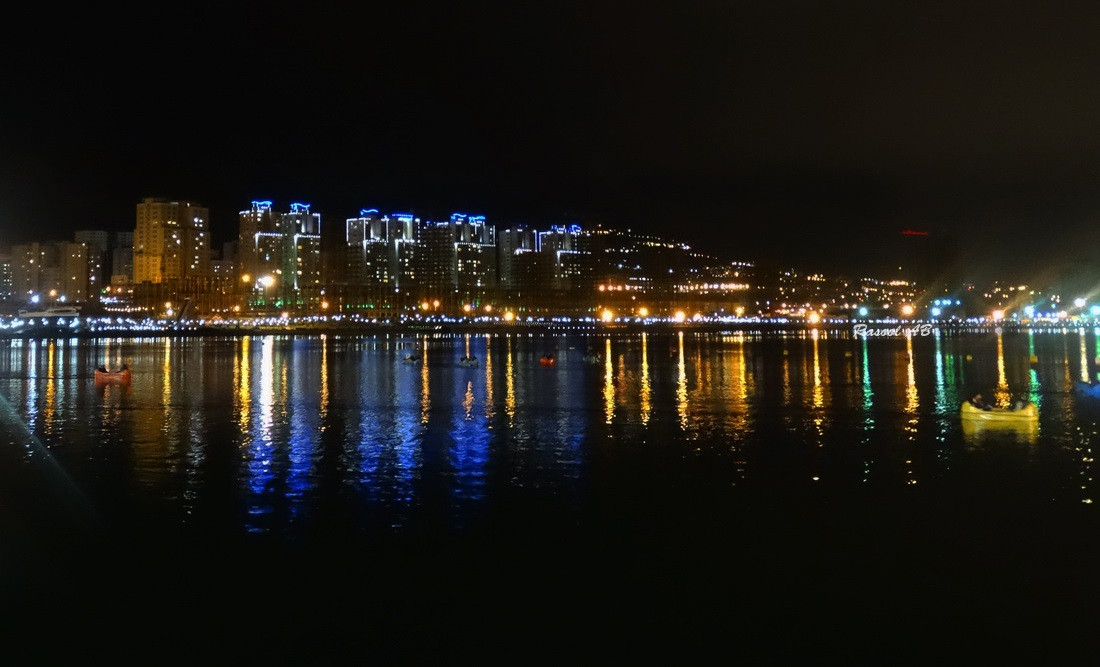
Chitgar Lake in night.

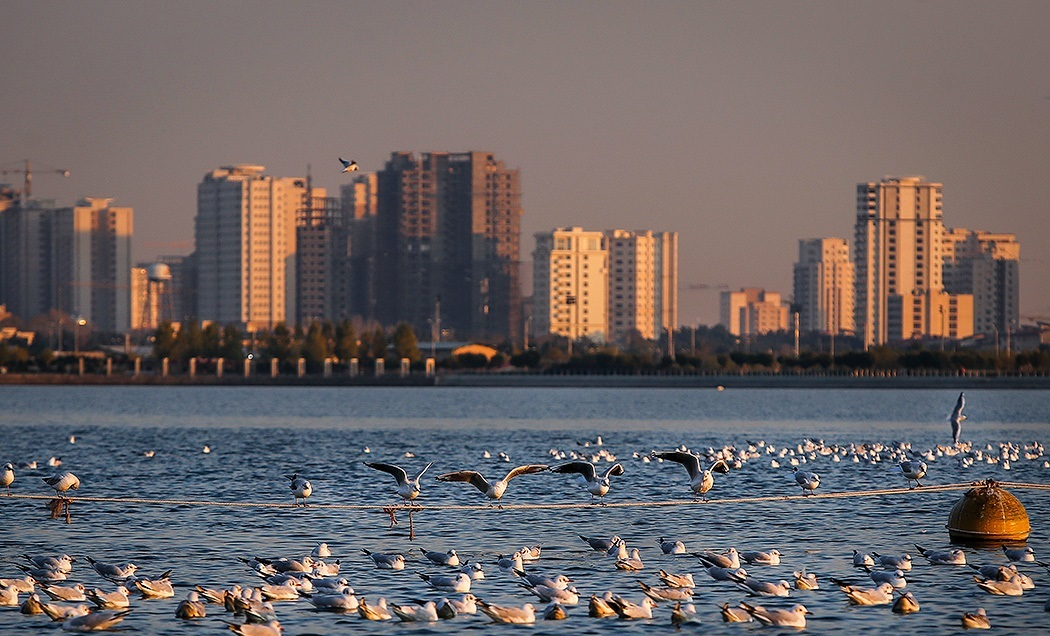
Siberian birds in Tehran Chitgar Lake.

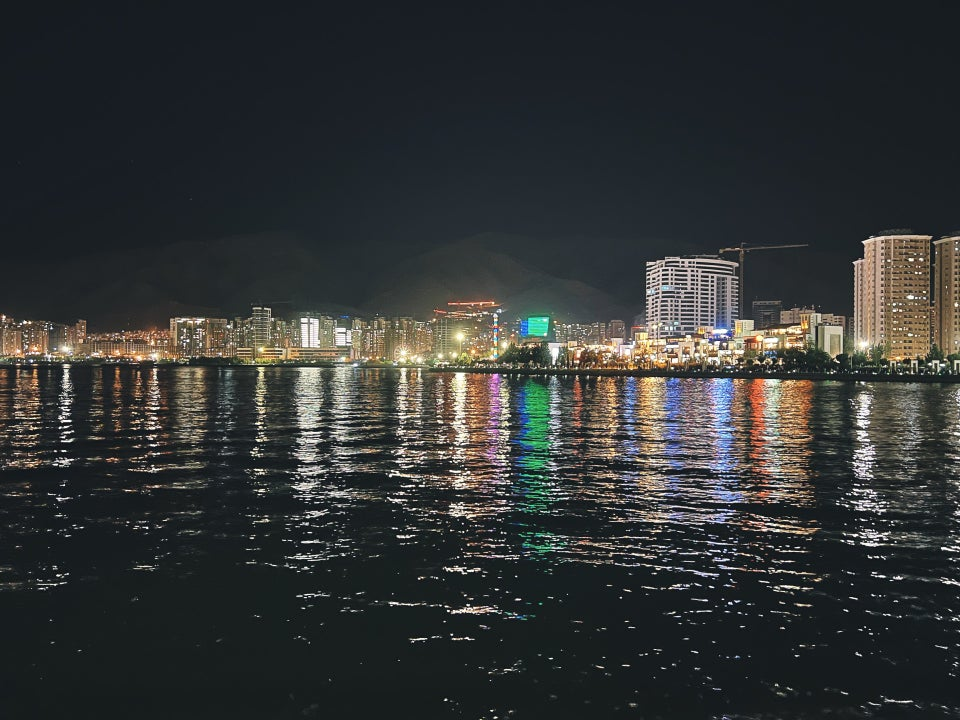
Chitgar in night.
