= Ayandeh Bank =

Defunct Iranian bank

- Company type: Public
- Traded as: Farabourse: وآيند; ISIN: IRO7AYNP0001
- Industry: Financial services
- Founded: 2009 (as Tat Bank); 2013 (as Ayandeh Bank)
- Defunct: 23 October 2025
- Fate: Dissolved
- Headquarters: Tehran, Iran
- Key people: Farshad Heydari (CEO); Ali Ansari (founder)
- Products: Retail banking; insurance; loans
- Total assets: 16,000 billion IRR (2017)

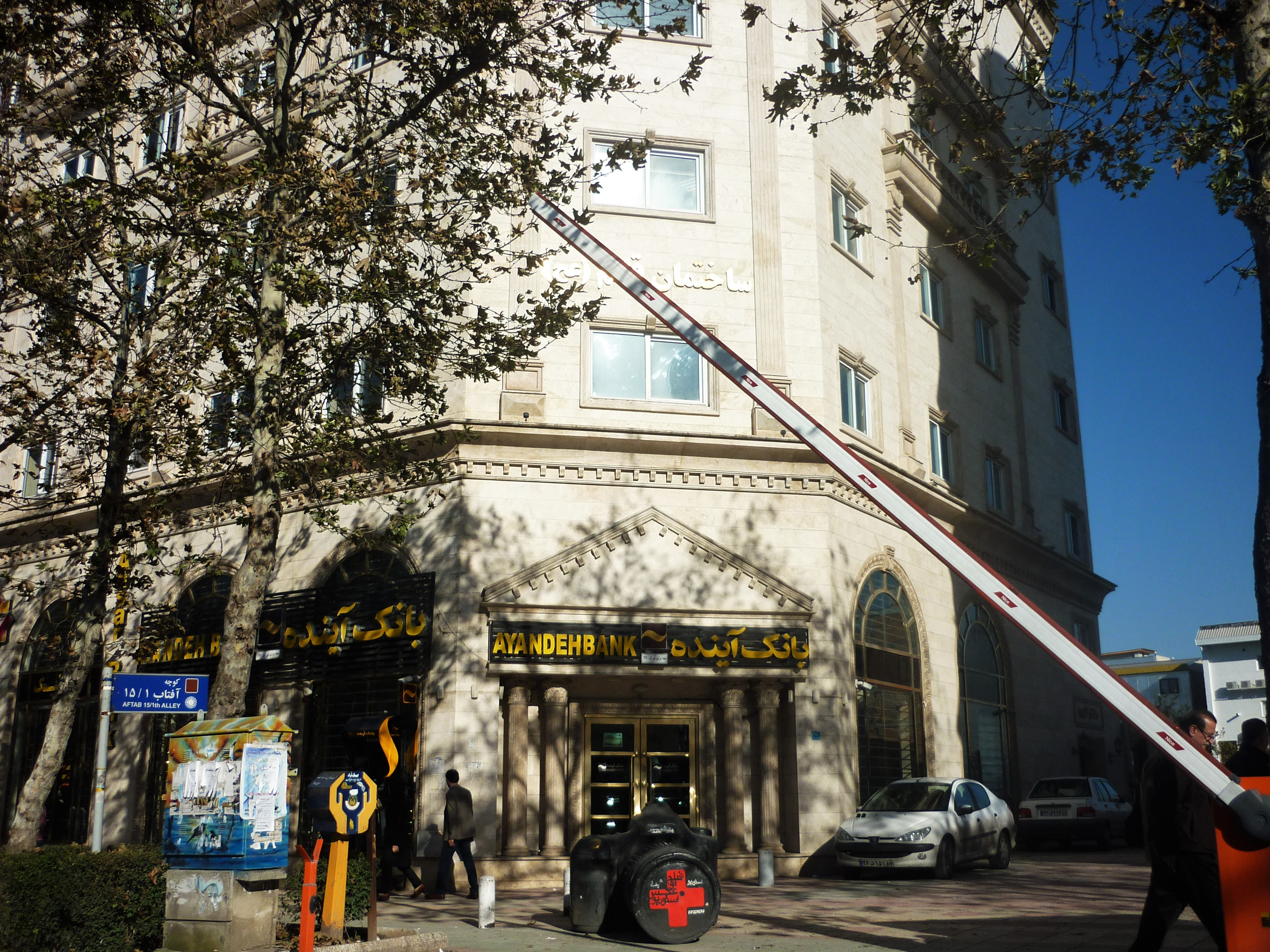
Ayandeh Bank branch in Amol

Ayandeh Bank was an Iranian bank established in 2013 by Ali Ansari. On 23 October 2025, its operating license was revoked, its banking operations were dissolved, and the Central Bank of Iran merged it with Bank Melli Iran.

== History ==
Ayandeh Bank was established in August 2013 by Ali Ansari, following the merger of two credit institutions and a bank. It began functioning as a private bank under the supervision of the Central Bank of the Islamic Republic of Iran in March 2015. Ayandeh offered the highest interest rates to retail depositors of any bank in Iran but had many non-performing loans on its books.

The bank's largest investment was Iran Mall, which opened in 2018. In December 2020, the bank announced the sale of the mall for $3.5 billion in a move to divest its non-banking assets. According to Tasnim news agency, "90% of the bank's resources were tied up in projects under its own management" when it was closed by banking authorities.

Ayandeh operated 270 branches all over Iran, including 150 in Tehran.

=== Dissolution ===
On 23 October 2025, the Central Bank of Iran revoked Ayandeh's operating license. It announced that the bank would be dissolved and merged with Bank Melli, the government-run national bank.

According to former Central Bank of Iran governor Mohammad-Reza Farzin, Ayandeh had accumulated losses of 5.5 quadrillion rials (about $5.1 billion), overdrafts totaling 3.13 quadrillion rials (about $2.9 billion), and a capital adequacy ratio of −600%.

Much of the blame for the dissolution was placed on corruption. Ayandeh was established at a time of weak regulatory oversight and high corruption in Iran's banking system. This instability coincided with economic pressures stemming from United Nations sanctions imposed on the country in connection with its nuclear program. During this period, numerous unlicensed financial institutions, many affiliated with state-owned enterprises, military organizations, or religious foundations, expanded rapidly across the nation. These entities attracted deposits by offering exceptionally high interest rates but frequently failed to honor repayment obligations, resulting in significant losses and restricted access to funds for many depositors.

After gaining control of Ayandeh, Ali Ansari had tied the bank's financial position to Iran Mall, whose financing was largely provided through the bank via extensive related-party lending to Ansari-linked companies. By 2025, Ayandeh had extended more than 140 trillion tomans in loans to affiliated entities, the majority of which were classified as doubtful receivables. The largest borrower was the Iran Mall International Development Company, which accounted for roughly 70 percent of all related-party loans and the bulk of non-performing debt. Additional Ansari-linked firms and politically connected companies also received significant financing.

Officials at the Central Bank of Iran accused the bank of running a Ponzi scheme.

== Affiliated companies ==
- Sanjesh Omid Ayandeh, investment consulting and financial services company
- Ertebat Farda, electronic commerce company
- Ayandeh Bank Brokerage Company

== Financial data ==
Year	Sales	Rank
2011–2012	4,630	125
2012–2013	11,561	86
2013–2014	41,617	37
2014–2015	73,839	24
2015–2016	111,297	1

== See also ==
- Banking and insurance in Iran
