= Iran and the World Trade Organization =

Middle East economic integration is a step towards WTO accession and a prime market opportunity for Iran's non-oil exports.

Iran officially submitted an application to join the World Trade Organization (WTO) on 19 July 1996. From July 1996 to May 2001, Iran’s application had not been considered, mainly as a result of US objections and the US veto power in the WTO Council. From May 2001 Iran’s application for WTO membership has been brought up 22 times. At the 22nd time, on 26 May 2005, Iran’s application for WTO membership was approved unanimously by the organization’s members (and thus by the United States and Israel as a goodwill gesture so as to ease the nuclear negotiations between Iran and the international community). Thus the process of Iran’s membership in the WTO started. Once Iran’s application was accepted and examined by WTO General Council, Iran became WTO observer member and started the process of full membership in the organization. In November 2009 Iran submitted the Foreign Trade Regime Memorandum as the process of accession entered a new phase.

== Status of accession working party ==
The Ministry of Commerce is in charge of managing the process of accession to the WTO. The next step includes setting-up and meetings of the WTO working party, which include protracted negotiations on a range of economic issues. Iran will join WTO as a full member only at the conclusion of this multi-year process and the implementation of the Iranian Economic Reform Plan.

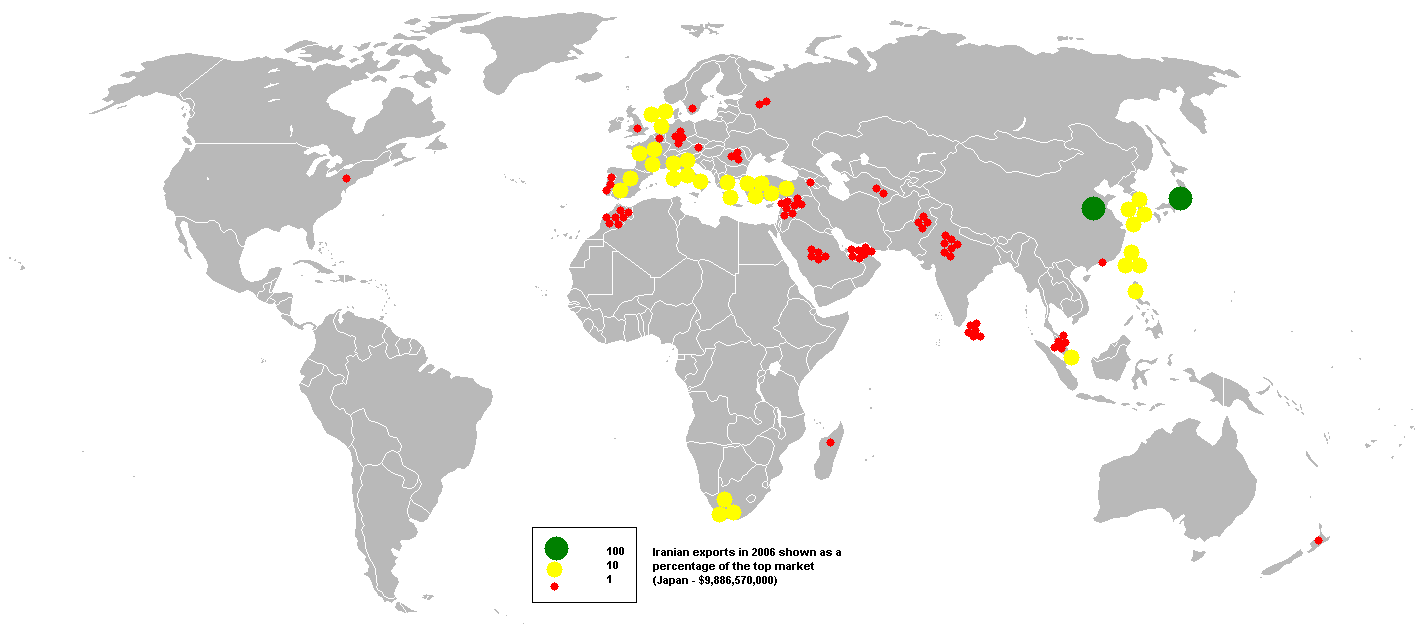
Iranian exports in 2006. Part of the non-oil exports are rising as the country is moving towards industrial diversification.

| WTO accession step - Iran | Date |
|---|---|
| 1. Application Received | 19 July 1996 |
| 2. Working Party Established | 26 May 2005 |
| 3. Memorandum | 24 November 2009^{1} |
| 4. Questions and Replies | |
| 5. Meetings of the Working Party | |
| 6. Recently submitted documentation | |
| 7. Market Access Negotiations | |
| 8. Factual Summary | |
| 9. Draft Working Party Report | |

^{1} New updated memorandum to be submitted by 2017.

== Economic Reform ==
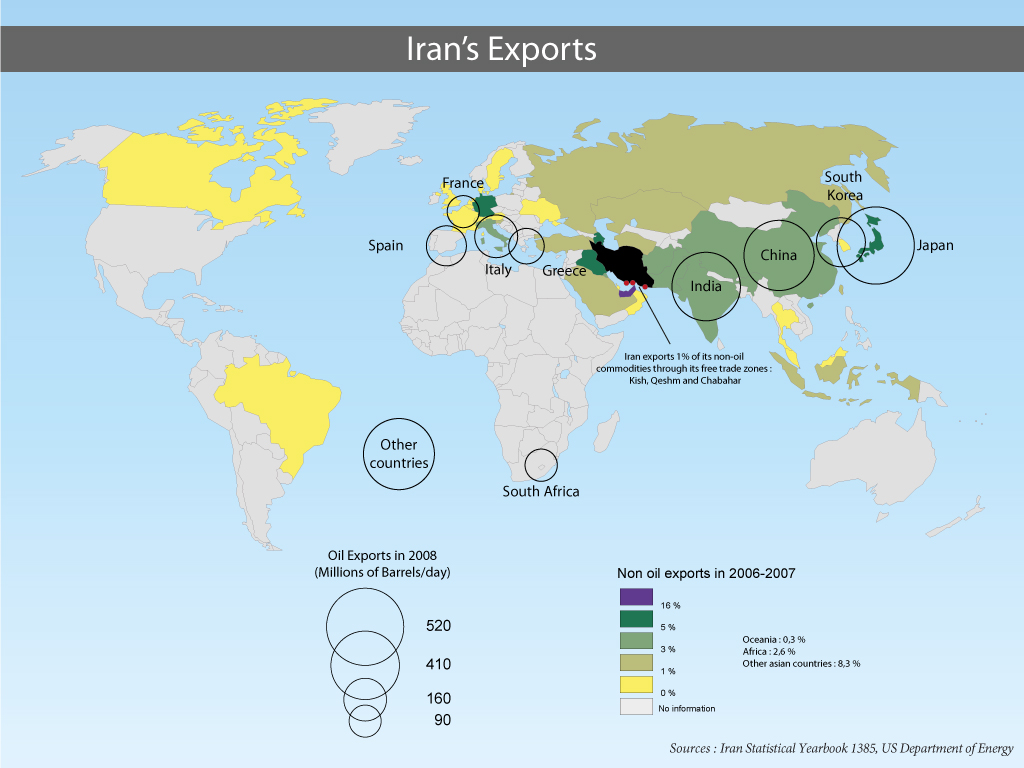
Iranian exports in 2006. Pistachios, liquefied propane, methanol, hand-woven carpets and automobiles are the core items of Iran's non-oil exports.

Import and exports of Iran (1995-2014) - in value terms, affected by oil prices

Iran has an observer status at the World Trade Organization (WTO) since 2005. The United States has consistently blocked Iran's bid to join the WTO since Tehran first asked for membership several years ago. Iran has allocated $20 billion in loans to launch 20 trade centers in other countries.

=== Exports ===
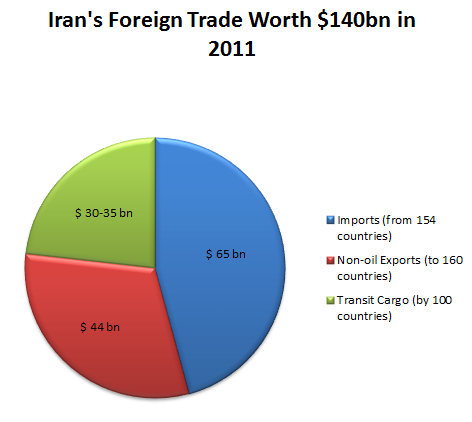
Iran's non-oil foreign trade was worth $140 billion in 2011.

The WTO in its report "World Trade 2011" has praised Iran’s export growth in 2011, noting that while world trade expanded in 2011 by only 5 percent, Iran’s exports raised more than 30 percent.

According to the report, Iran exported more than 131 billion dollars of merchandise in 2011, ranking as the 23rd biggest exporter in the world. The country’s exports in 2010 stood at 101 billion dollars, the report further said. Iran's non-oil exports increased over 500% in between 2005 and 2011. Iran's main non-oil exports are petroleum gases, liquefied gas hydrocarbons, liquefied propane, methanol, mineral fuels, chemical products, plastics, fruits, nuts, fertilizers, and carpets.

=== Free trade zones ===
Iran is hoping to attract billions of dollars' worth of foreign investment while creating a more favorable investment climate, such as reduced restrictions and duties on imports and the creation of free trade zones like in Qeshm, Chabahar and Kish Island.

=== IRGC ===
The lack of financial transparency and accountability into Iran’s inner economic workings empowers and supports the IRGC’s many illicit activities, as well as its control of a shadow economy. But there are also arguments that the IRGC should harness, rather than resist, globalization, with the question of World Trade Organization accession emerging as a key point of debate in Iran.

== WTO copyright laws ==
Iran's government has not agreed to be bound by WTO copyright laws, endorsing the free distribution of unlicensed software in massive quantities. Linux, freely reproducible even in countries with strong Intellectual Property (IP) laws, is also growing in popularity within Iran, however.

Iran may change this status if and when it becomes a full member of WTO, as WTO members are encouraged to abide by WTO copyright regulations. However, the United States has previously vetoed Iran's ascension to the WTO 22 times, and as of 2007 actively refuses to support Iran's full membership in the WTO. Thus, as a matter of reciprocity, Iran has determined that its interests are not served by observing WTO copyright treaties, and has thus exercised its sovereign right not to alter its laws, thereby making certain foreign copyrights unenforced by Iranian authorities, in theory, or in practice. Yet, if Iran does eventually gain membership status in the WTO, among other prerequisites, copyright laws will have to be obeyed in Iran. This would require a major overhaul of business and trade operations in Iran.

Iranian pharmaceutical manufacturers are disadvantaged by the government's poor intellectual property protection regime. Developing a molecule for combination therapies may qualify for patent protection in other countries. However, while weak patent law adherence continues in Iran, it is expected this will create significant barriers for Iranian companies prospecting trade on the global market.

== See also ==
- Economy of Iran
- Labor and tax laws in Iran
- Privatization in Iran
- Iranian Economic Reform Plan
- Intellectual property in Iran
- Foreign Direct Investment in Iran
- International rankings of Iran
- Iran Chamber of Commerce Industries and Mines
- World Trade Organization accession and membership
- Middle East economic integration
- Economic Cooperation Organization
- List of Iranian companies
- Group of 15
- Organisation of Islamic Cooperation (OIC)
- Indian Ocean Rim Association for Regional Cooperation
- International trade
- Iran-United States relations
- South-South Cooperation
