= List of economic laws in Iran =

The list of major laws and legal acts affecting trade in goods and services in Iran as of 2009:

- The Constitution of the Islamic Republic of Iran;
- The Twenty-Year Vision of the I.R. Iran;
- The Civil Code;
- The Commercial Code of the Iranian year 1311 (1922) and its Amendments of 1374 (2005);
- The 1990 Labour Act (the Iranian year 1369);
- The Export-Import Regulations Act of the Iranian year 1372 (1993) and its Executive Ordinance of the Iranian year 1373 (2004) together with its subsequent amendments;
- The Act on the Administration of Free Trade-Industrial Zones of the I. R. Iran of the Iranian year 1372 (1993) and its Revising Act of the Iranian year 1377 (1999);
- The Third Economic, Social and Cultural Development Plan Act of the Iranian year 1379 (2000);
- The Fourth Economic, Social and Cultural Development Plan Act of the Iranian year 1383 (2004);
- The Act on the Revision of the Third Economic, Social and Cultural Development Plan Act and on the Imposition and Collection of Duties and Other Fees from Producers of Goods and Providers of Iranian Goods and Services (better known as the Act on Consolidation of Duties) of the Iranian year 1381 (2002);
- Annual State Budgetary Acts;
- The 1991 Act on the Cooperatives Sector of the Economy of the Islamic Republic of Iran (the Iranian year 1370);
- The 1921 Act on the Registration of Corporations (the Iranian year 1310);
- The Trademarks and Patents Registration Act of the Iranian year 1310 (1931);
- The 1958 Amending By-Law of the Trademarks and Patents Registration Act (the Iranian year 1337)
- The Act on the Protection of the Rights of Authors, Composers and Artists of the Iranian year 1950 (1971), and its executive By-Law;
- The 1973 Act on the Translation and Reproduction of Books, Publications and Phonograms (the Iranian year 1352);
- The 2000 Act on the Protection of Rights of Creators of Computer Software (the Iranian year 1379);
- The 2004 Act on the Protection of Geographical Indications (the Iranian year 1383);
- The 2003 Act on the Registration of Plant Varieties and Control and Certification of Seed and Plant (the Iranian year1382);
- The 2003 Electronic Commerce Act (the Iranian year 1382);
- The 2001 Act on the Promotion and Protection of Foreign Investment (the Iranian year 1380);
- The 1992 Act on the Revision of the Laws and Regulations of the Institute of Standards and Industrial Research of Iran (the Iranian year 1371);
- The 1990 Act on the Islamic Republic of Iran Chamber of Commerce Industries and Mines (the Iranian year 1369)
- The 1987 Act on the State Public Auditing (the Iranian year 1366);
- The Direct Taxation Act of the Iranian year 1366 (1987) and its subsequent amendments;
- The 1995 Act on Transportation and Transit of Foreign Goods through the Territory of the Islamic Republic of Iran (the Iranian year 1374);
- The 1967 Act on Plant Protection (the Iranian year 1346);
- The 1972 State Monetary and Banking Act (the Iranian year 1351);
- The 1983 Act on Usury-Free Banking Operations (the Iranian year 1362);
- The 2005 Act on the Stock Market of the I.R. of Iran (the Iranian year 1384);
- The 1979 Legislative Bill on Nationalization of Insurance and Credit Institutes (the Iranian year 1358);
- The 1988 Act on Administration of the Affairs of Insurance Companies(the Iranian year 1367);
- The 1999 Act on the Revision of the Act on Administration of free Trade-Industrial Zones of the Islamic Republic of Iran (the Iranian year 1378) (regarding the establishment of insurance institutes in free zones);
- The 2000 Regulations on Establishment and Operation of Insurance Institutes in the Free Trade-Industrial Zones of the Islamic Republic of Iran (the Iranian year 1379) (approved by the Council of Ministers);
- The 2001 Act on the Establishment of Non-Government Insurance Institutes (the Iranian year 1380);
- The Act on Customs Affairs of the Iranian year 1350 (1971) and its Executive By-Law of 1351 (1972);
- The 2003 Act on the Unification of Formalities of Importation and Exportation of Goods and Services (the Iranian year 1382);
- The 1997 Act on the International Commercial Arbitration (the Iranian year 1376);
- The 2001 Act on the Articles of Association of the Arbitration Center of Iran Chamber of Commerce Industries and Mines (the Iranian year 1380);
- The 2001 Act on the Accession of the Government of the Islamic Republic of Iran to the Convention on Recognition and Enforcement of Arbitral Awards (the Iranian year 1380).

== See also ==
- Economy of Iran
- Intellectual property in Iran
- Taxation in Iran
- Iranian labor law
- Foreign Investment Promotion and Protection Act (FIPPA)
- Central Bank of Iran
- Banking and Insurance in Iran
- Supreme Audit Court of Iran
- Iranian nationality law
- Judicial system of Iran
- Iranian Calendar
- Government of Iran
- Iran's international rankings in economy
- Iran and WTO
