= Industry in Iran =

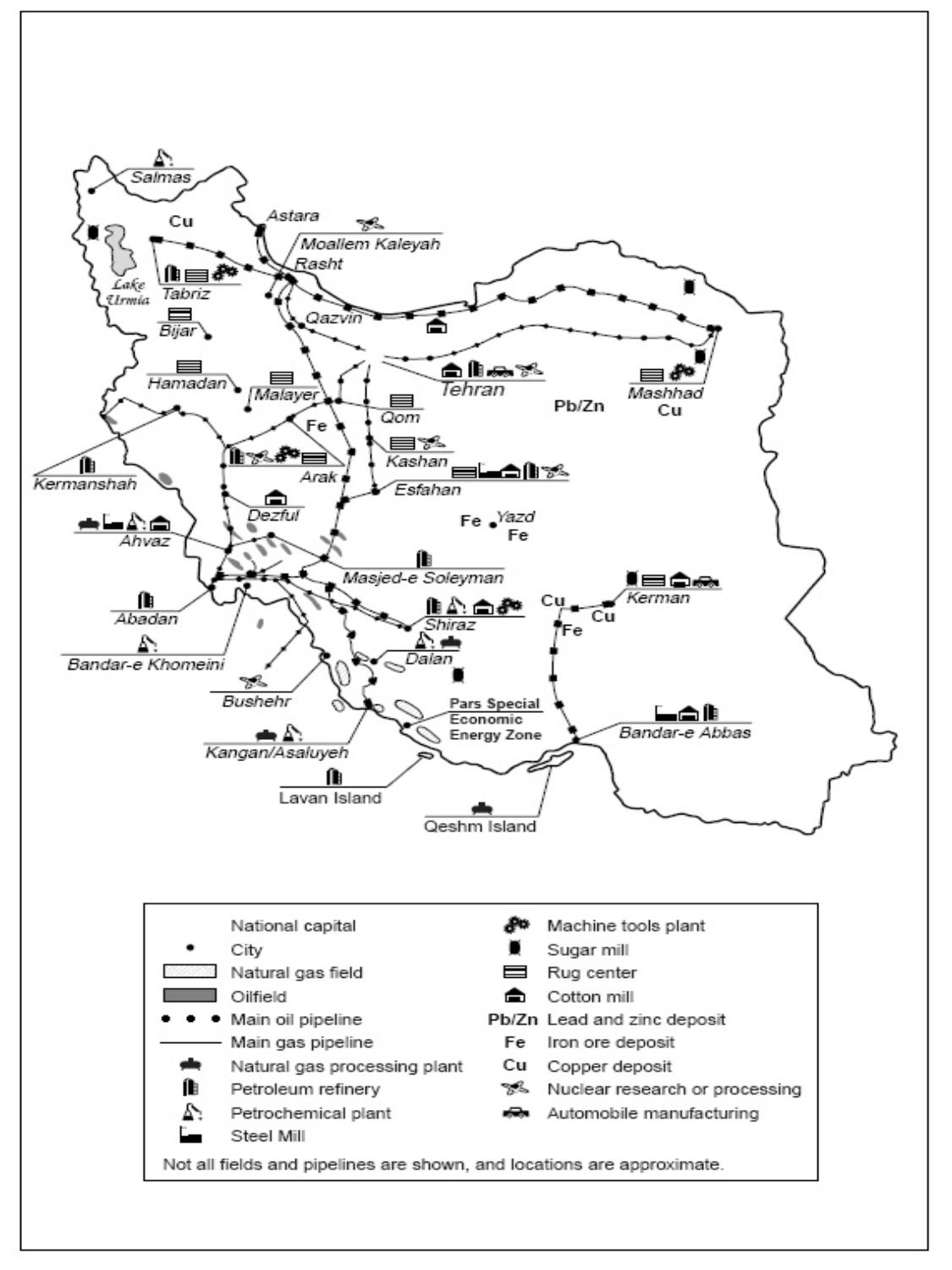
Iran has a broad and diversified industrial base. In 1998, the United Nations classified Iran's economy as semi-developed.

According to a report by The Economist, Iran has been ranked 39th for producing $23 billion of industrial products in 2008. From 2008 to 2009 Iran has leaped to 28th place from 69th place in annual industrial production growth rate.

The government of Iran has plans for the establishment of 50–60 industrial parks by the end of the fifth Five-Year Socioeconomic Development Plan by 2015. Iranian contractors have been awarded several foreign tender contracts in different fields of construction of dams, bridges, roads, buildings, railroads, power generation, and gas, oil and petrochemical industries. As of 2011, some 66 Iranian industrial companies are carrying out projects in 27 countries. Iran has exported over $20 billion worth of technical and engineering services over 2001–2011. The availability of local raw materials, rich mineral reserves, experienced manpower have all collectively played crucial role in winning the international bids.

== Ministry of Industries and Mines ==
Ministry of Industries and Mines is in charge of facilitating the expansion and promotion of industrial and mineral policies. The Ministry is also in charge of centralization and integration of policy making in the industrial and mining sector. Finally, this Ministry regulates all strategies, policies and plans relevant to the industrial and mining sector in Iran. The Department for High Technology Industries, also known as the High Tech Industries Centre (HTIC) is active in promoting research activities and in supporting the emergence of high tech firms. As of 2014, Iran has 930 industrial parks and zones.

=== Small and medium enterprises ===
Economic complexity index for Iran (1964–2014)

As of 2014, 81,000 small industrial units employed more than 1 million workers in Iran. Small industries constitute 92 percent of Iranian industries, 45 percent of the country's industrial employment, and 17 percent of the country's production. In Iran, because of its weakness or absence, the support industry makes little contribution to the innovation/technology development activities. Supporting the development of small and medium enterprises will strengthen greatly the supplier network in Iran. Difficulty in accessing financing is also a major concern for small and medium enterprises. In 2016, Iran had nearly 3,000 knowledge-based firms accounting for 70,000 jobs and $6.6 billion in revenue.

As of 2019, 43,650 SMEs were based in over 800 industrial parks in Iran, of which nearly 78 percent or 33,800 were active (1,100 of those SMEs are exporting domestic products to global markets).

A 2003-report made by United Nations Industrial Development Organization regarding the state of SME's in Iran identified these causes as the ones impeding Iran's industrial development: lack of monitoring institutions, inefficient banking system, lack of sufficient R&D, shortage of managerial skills, corruption, inefficient taxation, socio-cultural apprehensions, absence of social learning loops, lack of familiarity with international markets necessary for global competition, cumbersome bureaucratic procedures, shortage of skilled labor, lack of intellectual property protection, shortage of research centers, lack of social capital, social learning, social responsibility and socio-cultural values.

Despite these problems, recent studies reveal that over the past few years Iran has progressed rapidly in various scientific and technological fields. Major advancements have taken place in the petrochemical, pharmaceutical, aerospace, defense, and heavy industry sectors. Even in the face of U.S. economic sanctions, Iran appears to be emerging as an industrialized country.

== Production statistics ==
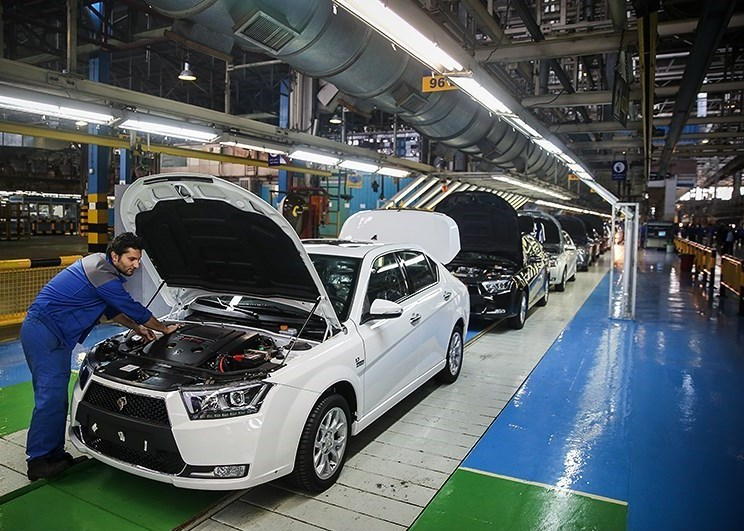
Iran Khodro is the largest car manufacturer in the Middle-East. It has established joint-ventures with foreign partners on 4 continents.

Tehran is the economic centre of Iran. About 30% of Iran's public-sector workforce and 45% of large industrial firms are located in Tehran and almost half of these workers work for the government.

Production of selected industrial goods Source: Ministry of Commerce (Iran)
2003	2001	1999	Unit	Product
26390	18180	12699	Ton	Preserved fish (tuna & sardine)
1264915	801395	671346	Ton	Pasteurized milk
1179139	852353	950555	Ton	Vegetable oil
1495	1113	923	Ton	Sugar
4976	4818	4418	Thousand tons	Non-alcoholic carbonated drink (except buttermilk)
112	60	000	Million bottles	Barley decoction
13873	13359	20143	Million each	Cigarette
293188	388790	227599	Ton	Thread
396	551	385	Million meters	Finished fabric
41195	51875	33933	Thousand square meters	Machine woven carpet
81286	43014	41676	Thousand square meters	Unwoven textile floor covering
11918	8166	5696	Thousand each	Blanket
390210	315502	359037	Ton	Paper
360017	306249	321232	Ton	Detergent
60607	75918	74984	Ton	Soap
1654	2351	2665	Million boxes	Matches
28241	24755	22219	Thousand ton	Cement
103867	76827	64105	Thousand square meters	Tiles and ceramic
490	346	342	Each	Combine
15377	12208	5173	Each	Tractor
1505	612	532	Each	Road construction machinery
447063	212664	182504	Each	Washing machine
13624	24559	21198	Thousand each	Electric sockets and switches
399692	129256	114399	Each	Radio sets and record players
858190	807964	860403	Each	Color TV sets
832420	933741	599701	Each	Water counter
1189912	906671	842063	Each	Electricity counters
663164	332643	194366	Each	Motor cars
1075	328	353	Each	Ambulances
12779	4303	3938	Each	Trucks and lorries
4460	1643	3783	Each	Buses
537	3226	940	Each	Mini buses
69036	46639	38508	Each	Vans and Mini vans

== Food industry ==
The sector also employs approximately 328,000 people or 16.1% of the entire industry sector's workforce. Iran exported $736 million worth of foodstuffs in 2007 and $1 billion (~600,000 tonnes) in 2010. Soft drinks, mineral water, biscuit, chocolate, confection, edible oil, dairies, conserved foods and fruits, jam and jelly, macaroni, fruit juice and yeast were among the main exports to Iraq, Afghanistan, Turkmenistan, Tajikistan and other Central Asian countries, Russia, Ukraine, Belarus, Pakistan, Saudi Arabia, Kuwait, United Arab Emirates, Qatar, Oman, Syria, Germany, Spain, the Netherlands, France, Canada, Venezuela, Japan, South Korea and Turkey. As of 2015, Swiss-based Buhler Group is a leading supplier of industrial equipment to Iran's food industry.

== Retail industry ==
At present the Iranian retail industry is largely in the hands of cooperatives, many of them government-sponsored, and of independent retailers in the bazaars. The bulk of food sales occur at street markets, where the Chief Statistics Bureau sets the prices.

Behpakhsh Co., Golrang Pakhsh and Ghasem Iran are the largest distribution companies in Iran. Ghasem provides more than 80,000 retailers with their requirements of consumer goods within the territories of Iran, Afghanistan, and Iraq.

Iran has 438,478 small grocery retailers. These are especially popular in cities other than Tehran where the number of hypermarkets and supermarkets is still very limited. More mini-markets and supermarkets are emerging, but these are mostly one-off, independently owned operations. The most significant chains are the state-owned Etka, Refah, Shahrvand and Carrefour-owned Hyperstar Market, all of which are gearing up for expansion. Migros Turk has also announced that it intends to invest in Iran's lucrative retail market. In 2010, a state-linked technology group (the Rouyesh Technical Centre) established the country's first online supermarket.

Imports still account for a considerable proportion of consumer goods consumption in Iran, and Dubai, United Arab Emirates-based companies meet much of the demand; they re-export from Western and Asian countries, making Iran the UAE's most important re-export market. In 2012, Iranians spent $77 billion on food, $22 billion on clothes and $18.5 billion on outward tourism. In 2015, overall consumer expenditures and disposable income are respectively projected to be $176.4 billion and $287 billion.

Before the revolution in 1979, Iran was a major importer of Western apparel and foreign-manufactured consumer goods. Even now Iran is no stranger to Western retail influences, with numerous brands and goods available in shopping centers and outlets on Kish Island. Latest major shopping centers constructed in Iran as of 2017 are:

1. Isfahan City Center (5 million square feet) with 750 units;
2. Persian Gulf Complex (4.8 million square feet) with 2,500 units;
3. Iran Mall (21
4. million square feet);
5. Tehran Mall (1.6 million square feet) with 500 units;
6. Atlas Mall (1.5 million square feet) with 308 units;
7. Palladium Mall (1.1 million square feet) with 105 units;
8. Laleh Park Shopping Center (985,000 square feet) with 126 units;
9. Arg Complex (840,000 square feet) with 200 units;
10. Oxin City Center (540,000 square feet) with 100 units.

The Supreme Leader of Iran has repeatedly urged Iranians to consume more domestically produced goods over imported ones to support the resistance economy and import substitution industrialization.

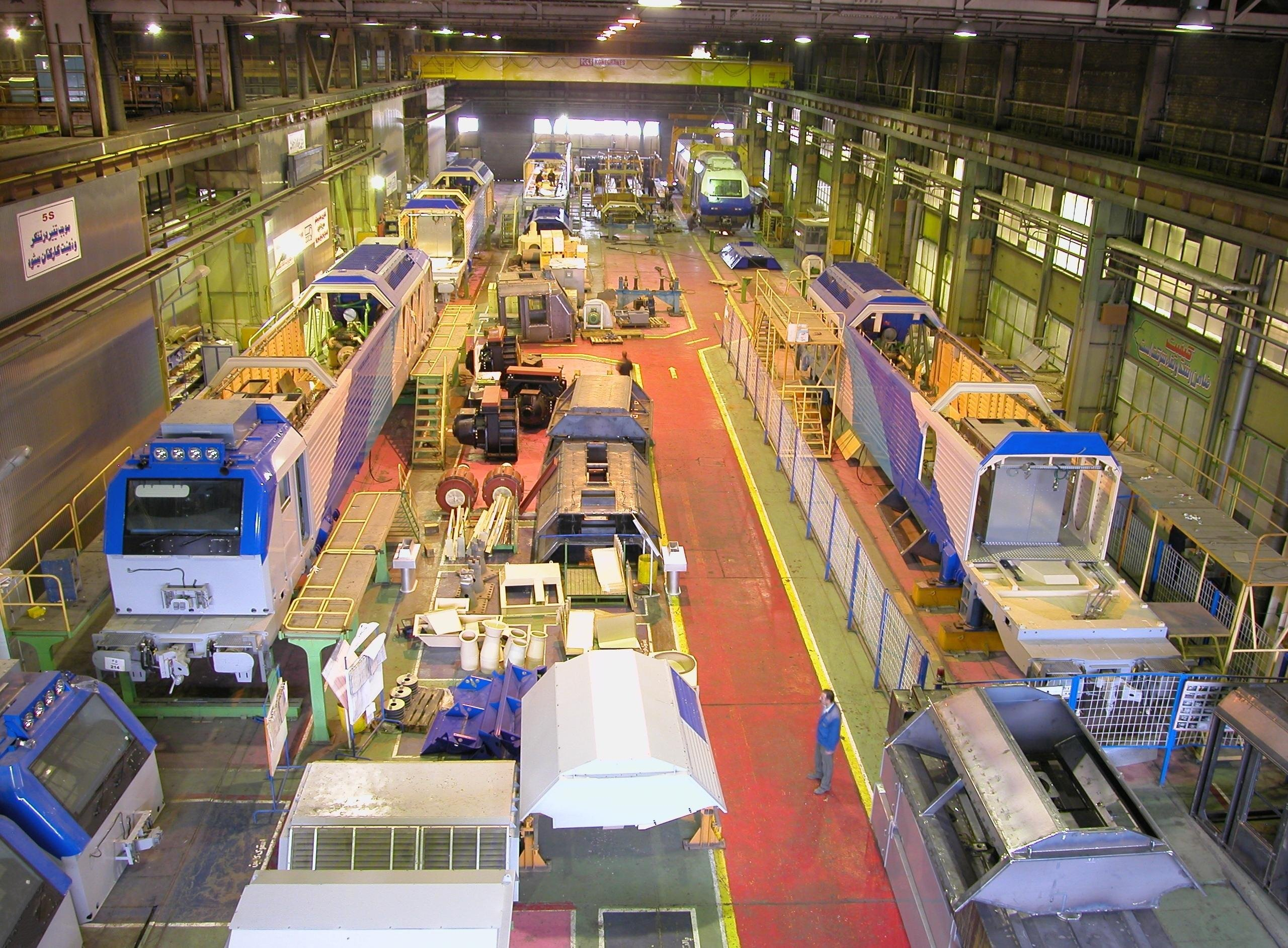
Locomotive production line of Wagon Pars Company

=== Brands ===
According to research study, IEI, Bank Saderat Iran, Hamrah Aval, Iran Khodro, Sanatiran, Wagon Pars, Sanayeiran, Machine Sazi Arak (MSA), Zar Macaron, DESA, Pars Khodro, HEPCO, Steel Alborz, IRALCO, Yek-o-Yek, AzarAb Industries, Golbaft, Navard Aluminium, Takdaneh, Darou Pakhsh, Kalleh, Behrouz, Delpazir, Iran Combine Manufacturing Company (ICM), Sepehr Electric, Arjan, Khoshkhab, Novin Zafaran, Havilux, Boof chain restaurants, Telavang and Golrang are the best brands in the country. Hamshahri and Donya-e-Eqtesad newspapers and Movafaqiyat magazine were selected as the best press.

== Automotive industry ==
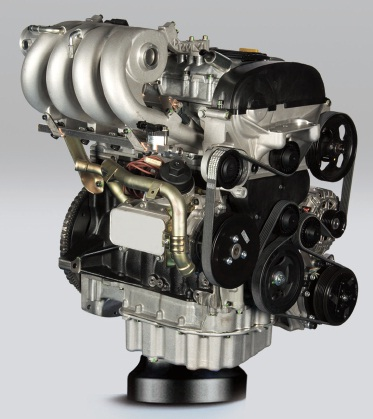
EF7 Iran-made engines

Iran's automotive industry is the second most active industry of the country, after its oil and gas industry. Iran's automobile production crossed the 1 million mark in 2005. Iran holds some of the biggest industrial complexes in the region, Iran Khodro is the largest car manufacturer in the Middle-East, ITMCO is the largest tractor manufacturer in the middle east. Iran Khodro has established joint-ventures with foreign partners on 4 continents. Iran is the 12th largest automaker in the world.

== Defense industry ==
The Iranian defense industry has taken great strides in the past 25 years, and now manufactures many types of arms and equipment, including its own tanks, armored personnel carriers, guided missiles, radar systems, guided missile destroyer, military vessels, submarines, and a fighter plane. According to Iranian officials, the country sold $100 million worth of military equipment in 2003, including NATO members, and as of 2006 had exported weapons to 57 countries.

In a conference, Iran's Deputy Minister of Defense said: Iran's military products exports from March 2022 to March 2023 have reached about one billion dollars.

== Construction industry ==
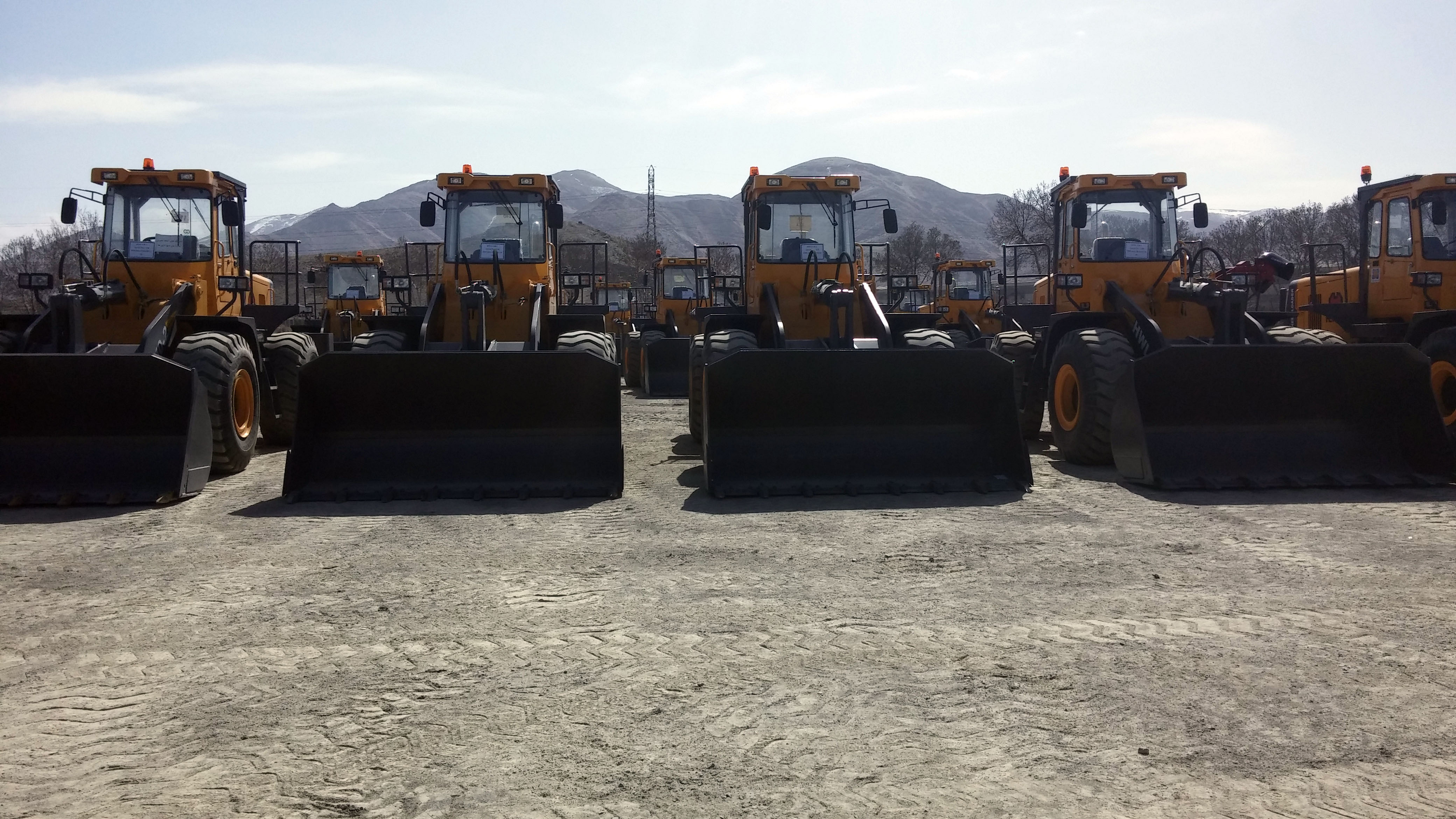
HEPCO wheel loaders

Construction is one of the most important sectors in Iran accounting for 20–50% of the total private investment. The Central Bank of Iran indicate that 70 percent of the Iranians own homes. The housing industry is one of the few segments of the Iranian economy where state capital shares as little as two per cent of the market, and the remaining 98 per cent is private sector investment. There is little red tape or hurdles and, as a result, through launching mass development projects, the use of new technologies and fast-pace project execution, a larger portion of the housing market is accessible. This is also true for new construction materials and technological advances.

== Mining and metals ==
Iran is one of the most important mineral producers in the world, ranked among 15 major mineral-rich countries. The country holds 68 types of minerals, including chrome, lead, zinc, copper, coal, gold, tin and iron which includes 37 billion tons of proven reserves and more than 57 billion tons of potential reserves of minerals .

== Textiles and apparel industry ==
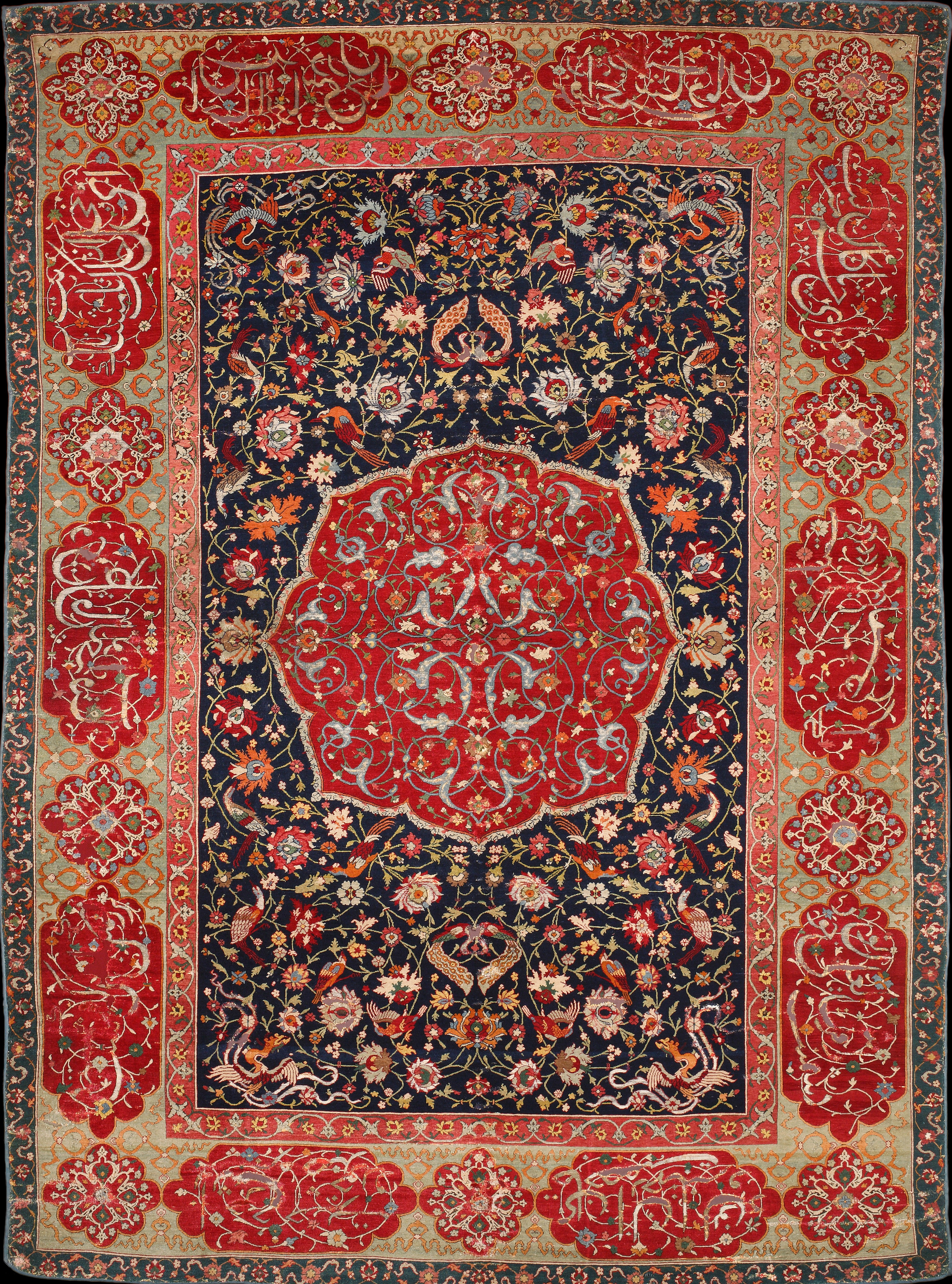
So-called Salting carpet, wool, silk and metal thread. about 1600

Textile mills, based on domestic cotton and wool such as Tehran Patou and Iran Termeh, among others, employed about 400,000 people in 2000 and are centered in Tehran, Isfahan and along the Caspian coast. Iran, with a population of 70 million, requires 1.4 billion square meters of textiles annually. Overseas companies smuggle illegal textiles and apparel into Iran at a rate that is decimating Iran textile manufacturers and costing Iranian jobs. The annual textile production has been restricted to 800 million square meters.

Growth of the textile industry components, 1995–2000
Industry components	Workforce, 1995	Workforce, 2000	Share in total manufacturing employment, 1995 (percent)	Share in total manufacturing employment, 2000 (percent)
Spinning, weaving and finishing of textiles	112,714	107,565	14.2	12.0
Other textiles (line, jute, etc.)	30,879	31,794	3.9	3.5
Knitted and crocheted fabrics and articles	3,631	2,459	0.5	0.5
Wearing apparel, except fur apparel	8,608	4,800	1.1	0.5

Source: United Nations Industrial Development Organization (UNIDO)

Further information:

- Textile industry in Iran – Encyclopedia Iranica
- Association of Iran Textile Industries

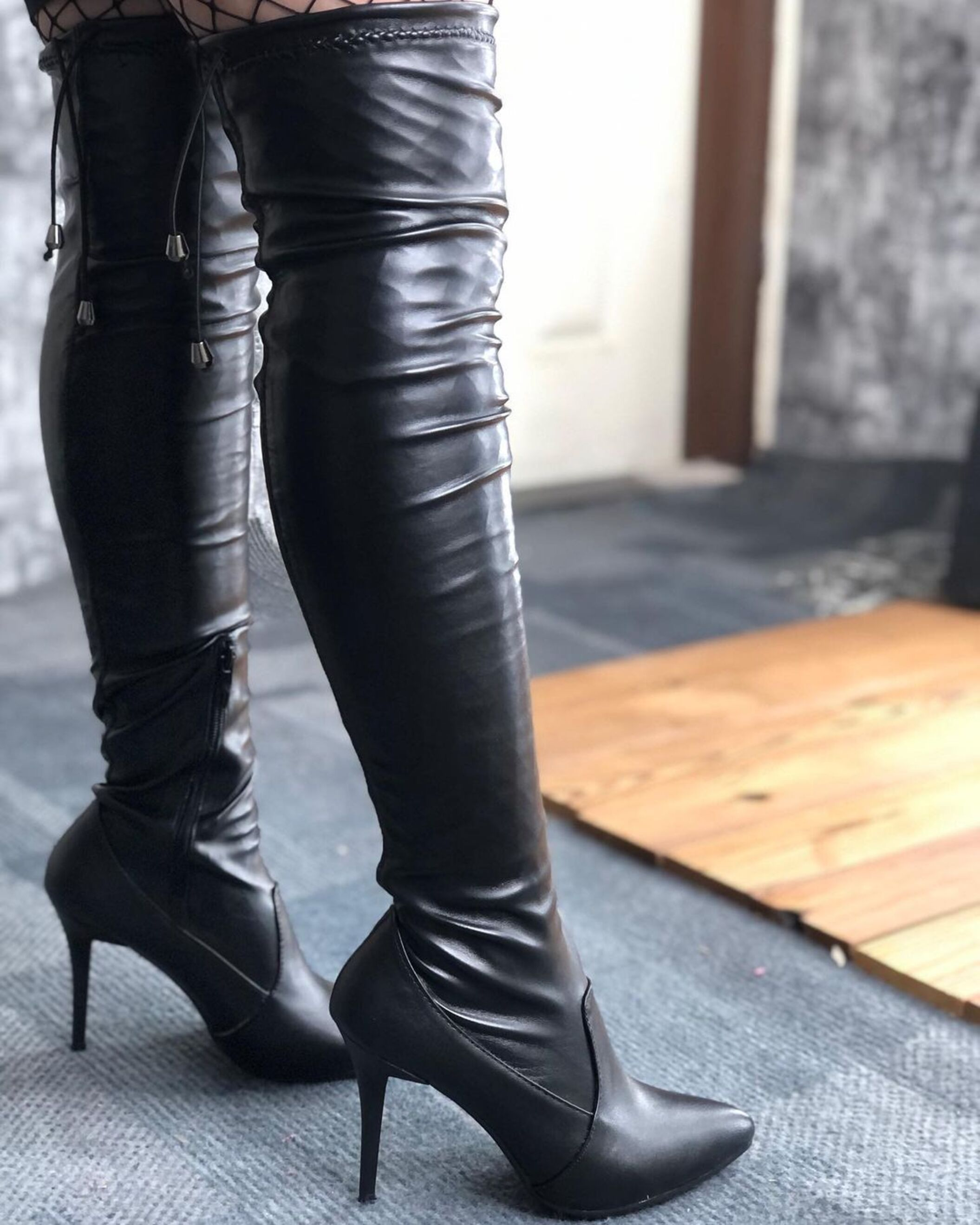
An Iranian woman with made in Iran leather boots. Iran has an advanced leather industry for women's clothing, however, it needs technology development for export.

Iran’s modern leather industry (Persian: صنعت چرم ایران) began at the start of the twentieth century. Despite the industry's long history and the livestock hide's genetic proficiency, there are technical problems for Iranian leather industry. Since the 2000s, the production of women's leather boots in various designs has been able to give a new life to Iran's leather industry. Iranian thigh-high boots with black leather can be found all over the region.

== Aviation industry ==
Iran is producing 59-seat aircraft inside the country such as HESA IrAn-140 with the help of Russia and Ukraine and it will shift focus to 90 to 120-seat airplanes in the next step. Iran also produces military attack aircraft such as HESA Saeqeh. With a population of 70 million, Iran needs to have 6,300 airplanes while it does not possess more than nine aircraft for every one million individuals.

== Pharmaceuticals and healthcare industry ==
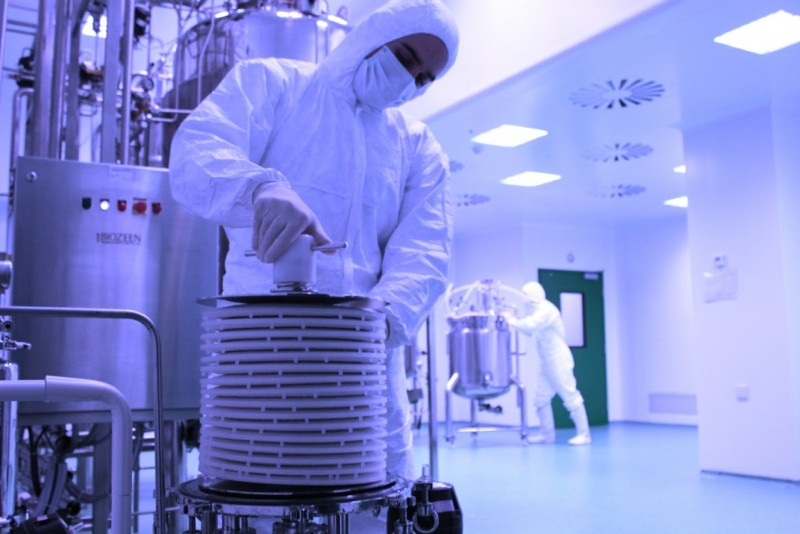
AryoGen

The pharmaceutical industry in Iran began in its modern form in 1920 when the Pasteur Institute of Iran was founded. Iran has a well-developed pharmaceutical production capability, however, the country still relies on imports for raw materials and many specialized drugs. In 2009, Iran exported $74 million worth of "medical products" to countries such as Iraq, Afghanistan and Russia.

== Oil, gas and petrochemicals ==
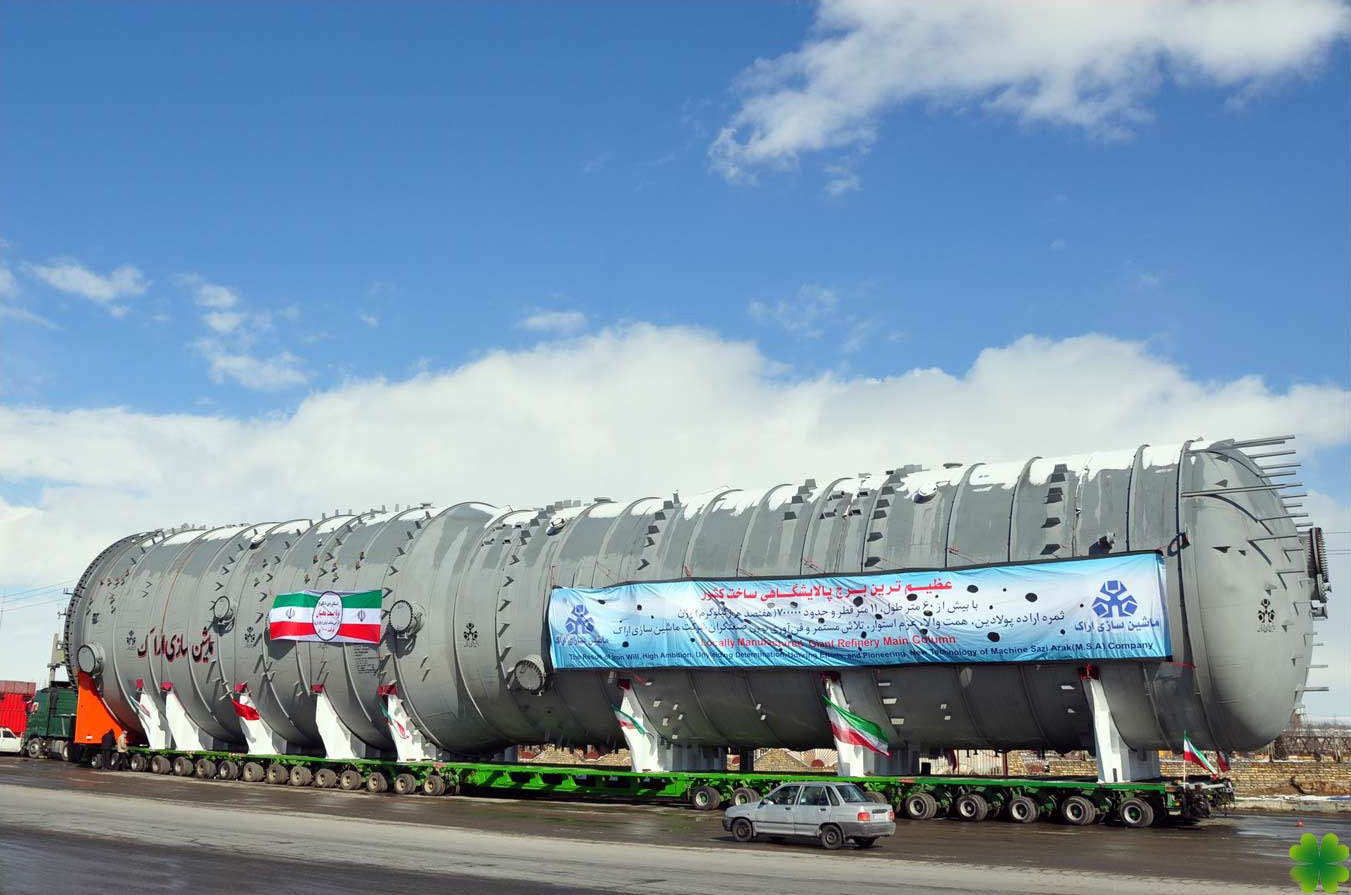
Giant Fractionating column manufactured by Machine Sazi Arak

Iran's oil and gas industry is the most active industry of the country. Iran has the fourth largest reserves of oil and second largest reserves of gas in the world.

Domestic production of equipment in the nation's upstream oil industries has grown four-fold in as many years while procurement of equipment and goods accounts for around 60 to 65 percent of any oil project. Iran manufactures 60–70% of its industrial equipment domestically, including various turbines, pumps, catalysts, refineries, oil tankers, drilling rigs, offshore platforms and exploration instruments.

== Power ==
Iran has become self-sufficient in designing, building and operating dams and power plants and it has won a good number of international bids in competition with foreign firms. Iran is one of the six countries in the world that manufacture gas and steam powered turbines.

== Electronics and computer industry ==
Iran's domestic consumer electronic market, defined as including computing devices, mobile handsets and video audio and gaming products, was estimated at $7.3 billion in 2008 ($8.2 billion in 2010), with 47% market share for computer hardware, 28% Audio/Video and 25% mobile phone (with growing demand for PDAs, smart phones and 3G handsets). Business Monitor International (BMI) forecasts that Iran's demands for domestic consumer electronic devices will reach $10 billion by 2013.

== Telecommunications ==
Iran is among the first five countries which have had a growth rate of over 20% and the highest level of development in telecommunication. Iran's Ministry of Communication and Information Technology along with TCI are developing the landline telephone network in the towns of Karbala and Najaf in Iraq.

== Banking industry ==
Shariah-compliant assets has reached about $400 billion throughout the world, according to Standard & Poor's Ratings Services, and the potential market is $4 trillion. Iran, Saudi Arabia and Malaysia are at the top with the biggest sharia-compliant assets. Bank Melli, Saderat and Sepah are Iran's three largest banks.

== Tourism industry ==
Officials state that Iran has in recent years earned about US$1bn a year from tourism. Iran currently ranks 68th in tourism revenues worldwide. Iran with attractive natural and historical sites is rated among the "10 most touristic countries" in the world. Area considered for further expansion in the tourism sector in Iran are eco tourism, coastlines, restoration of historical relics, handicraft townships, and health tourism (e.g. water therapy).

== Naval industry ==
Over the next two decades, Iran would need 500 new ships, including 120 oil tankers, 40 liquefied natural gas (LNG) carriers and over 300 commercial vessels. In 2009, in a move aimed at further enhancing Iran's shipbuilding industry, President Mahmoud Ahmadinejad said he will ban the purchase of foreign ships by Iranian organizations. The Ministry of Commerce has confirmed that Iran is able to build all its needed sea fleets inside the country. Iran's SADRA launched its first Aframax oil tanker made for Venezuela in 2012.

== Machine tools ==
Machine Sazi Tabriz Group has managed to manufacture machines such as VMC850, VMC 1050, FP4ME, TME40NEW, and TC-20 HF and it has exported turning and milling machineries worth €1.5 million to Germany, Austria, Azerbaijan, Turkey and Malaysia during 2011.

== See also ==
- Economy of Iran
- Foreign Direct Investment in Iran
- Labor and tax laws in Iran
- Economic history of Iran
- Bonyad
- Bank of Industry and Mine
- List of Iranian companies
- Iran Chamber of Commerce Industries and Mines
- Industrial Development and Renovation Organization of Iran (IDRO)
- Institute of Standards and Industrial Research of Iran
- Science and technology in Iran
- Privatization in Iran
- Tehran Stock Exchange
- International rankings of Iran
- Environmental issues in Iran
- Industry
- Machine tool
