= Golrang Industrial Group =

Iranian consumer goods company

Golrang Holding Golrang Industrial Group گروه صنعتی گلرنگ Gruh-e Sân'ti-ye Gâlreng
- Type: Private holding
- Industry: Consumer goods
- Founded: 1960; 66 years ago
- Founder: Mohammad Karim Fazli
- Headquarters: Tehran, Iran
- Area served: Worldwide
- Key people: Mehdi Fazli (Chairman); Mehdi Fazli (CEO)
- Products: Foods, Beverages, Motion Pictures, Prescription Drugs, Cellulosic, Cleaning Agents and Personal Care products
- Number of employees: +50,000 (2021)
- Website: www.golrang.com

Golrang Industrial Group (GIG) consists of nearly 100 subsidiaries, operating in regional, national and international levels, and in diverse fields of business, including: Hygiene and detergent, food industries, pharmaceutical industries, cellulose industry, distribution and sales, cosmetics, automotive industry, oil and gas, petrochemical, mine, energy, construction, international trading services, printing and packaging, insurance services, transportation, manufacturing polymer and plastic products, education services, information technology, industrial kitchen equipment. At present, more than 50,000 employees are working in Golrang Industrial Group.

== History ==
Mohammad Karim Fazli founded Pakshoo Company in 1972, beginning its operations in Zanjan. The company initially produced products under the Golrang brand, specializing in detergents, cosmetics, and hygiene items. Over the years, Pakshoo grew to become one of Iran's largest manufacturers of cleaning products. In 1991, Mehdi Fazli joined Pakshoo, and under his leadership, the company expanded its production. In 1995, new products such as shampoos and liquid hand soaps were added to the Golrang lineup. By 1999, GolPakhsh Aval was established to manage the marketing, sales, and distribution of Pakshoo’s products. That same year, Golrang Pakhsh was registered to distribute Golrang-branded products, while Padideh Shimi Nili was launched to produce raw materials; it later merged with Padideh Shimi Jam.

Golrang Industrial Group was formally established in 2003, with Mohammad Karim Fazli as Chairman and Mehdi Fazli as CEO. In 2005, Padideh Shimi Paydar was founded to produce and distribute cleaning and hygiene products.

In 2007, Golrang launched its first food production plant, Dalin Mehr, and Pakshoo’s production complex expanded to include five factories producing various cleaning products and raw materials. That same year, Padideh Paydar Distribution Company was founded to distribute cleaning products under the “Active” brand, and Golrang also launched its own university, the Golrang University of Applied Science and Technology, in 2008 to enhance employee skill development.

In 2008, Middle East Capital Investment Company was established as a major holding company. In 2009, Golrang introduced Ofogh Kourosh Chain Stores and registered Marinasan for producing tissue paper, starting production in 2009. In 2011, Golbarg Baharan was established to produce food items, including oils, canned foods, tomato paste, and tuna. The same year, Golrang expanded into pharmaceuticals, founding Golrang Pharmaceutical Holding.

In 2013, Kourosh Food Industry joined Golrang as a producer of edible oils, and Masterfoodeh was established to produce gums, including brands such as Biodent and Action Gum, for domestic and international markets. Biodent, Masterfoodeh’s main brand, received certification from the Toothfriendly Foundation in 2018 for its sugar-free gum products.

In 2014, the group opened the Kourosh Commercial and Cultural Complex (Kourosh Mall), which includes Iran’s largest cinema complex.

Founder and Chairman Mohammad Karim Fazli died in 2020, with Mehdi Fazli succeeding him as Chairman.

== Brands ==
Golrang Industrial Group owns dozens of brands. Brands such as: Golrang, Avé, Softlan, Oila, Famila, Active, Suntin Barlie, Nancy, Home plus, Merci, Merident, Goldent...

== Product Categories ==
Production of more than 60 product categories with annual sales, exceeding 1 billion product units, the growth rate of more than three times higher than of the industry, within the past 20 years, investment of more than 400 billion rials in order to equip and develop research laboratories, and many other items are among the capabilities of Golrang Industrial Group.

== List of Golrang Holding Companies ==
- Golrang
  - Hasti Aryan Taamin
  - Golrang System
  - Pakshoo
  - GPA (Gol Pakhsh e Aval)
  - Hyper Famili Chain Stores
  - MSCI (Marina Sun Cellulose Industrial)
  - Golrang Pakhsh
  - Padideh Shimi Nili
  - Padideh Shimi Paydar
  - Anitasun Industrial Group
  - Ofogh Koorosh Chain Stores
  - Kourosh Dried Fruits & Legumes Industry (KBI)
  - ATS (Aryan Tejarat Shargh)
  - ASP (Aryan System Pardaz)
  - Tiyan Gas Steel Industrial
  - MasterFoodeh Food Industry
  - Aryan System Pardaz
  - Golbarg Baharan
  - Pakan Plastkar
  - Pakhshe Padideh Paydar(Active)
  - Golrang Pharmaceutical Investment Group
  - Hasti Aria Shimi Co. P.J.S.
  - Arian Salamat Sina Co. P.J.S
  - Hasti Arian Darou Co. P.J.S.
  - Salamat Pakhshe Hasti co. P.
  - Golrang University
  - Golrang Media Institute (GMI)
  - Golrang Electronics Industries (GEI)
  - Aryan Sanaat Rafie (ASR)
  - Golrang Motor Family (GMF)
  - Tejarat Electronic Kourosh (TEK)
  - Koorosh Protein Company (KPC)

== Subsidiary companies ==
The GIG's subsidiaries are as follows:

Golrang Industrial Group subsidiaries
| Company name | Activities |
|---|---|
| Hasti Aryan Tamin | Hasti Aryan Taamin is a company active in the production and distribution of tea, spices, and other food products, with a focus on product diversity and customer satisfaction in the competitive food industry. |
| Pakshoo | Pakshoo chemical and manufacturing company is the biggest private sector in manufacturing complete range of hygienic, Cosmetics and detergent products in Iran. |
| Golrang Pakhsh | A Sales and Distribution Company with 30 branches in covering Iran |
| Ofogh Koorosh Chain Stores | Leading supermarket chain in Iran with more than 2600 branches in covering Iran. |
| GPA (Gol Pakhsh e Aval) | Diversified Sales and Distribution Company having its subsidiaries in 6 provinces and 44 sub-agents covering whole Iran |
| Golrang System | Golrang System operates in the field of Information and Communication Technology (ICT) with the purpose of providing information technology solutions to help increase the efficiency and profitability of Golrang Industrial Group. |
| Padideh Shimi Nili | Manufacturer of chemical raw materials for personal and home care industry |
| ATS (Aryan Tejarat Shargh) | General Import & Export of Primary materials |
| ASP (Aryan System Pardaz) | Software and Hardware services and with more than 85 experts in computer engineering. |
| MSCI (Marina Sun Cellulose Industrial) | producing cellulosic products including tissue paper, napkins Dlsy, cloth towels, baby diapers |
| MasterFoodeh Food Industry | Dragee and mini stick chewing gum in different types of packaging like foil pack, wallet and shaker top. |
| Padideh Shimi Paydar | Manufacturing hygienic and detergent with brand name of Active |
| Ofogh Koorosh Chain Stores | Koorosh Co. chain stores with the aim of developing the country in retail services |
| Kourosh Dried Fruits & Legumes Industry (KBI) | Manufacturer, Packer and Exporter of dried fruits and nuts |
| Pakan Plastkar | Pakan Plastkar Company is a leading manufacturer of a wide range of disposable plastic products including "Food storage bag", "Zipper bag", "Garbage bag", "glove", "tablecloth" etc.. as well as toothbrush. Additionally the company is specialized in producing various PET Preforms and PE/PP Caps and bottles. |
| Pakhshe Padideh Paydar | This company distribute detergent product under Active brand . |
| Golrang Pharmaceutical Investment Group | The main investor and supporter of Hasti Ariya Shimi, Arian Salamat Sina, Hasti Arian Darou, Salamat Pakhsheh Hasti,.... |
| Golbarg Baharan | The company of food production such as Edible oil, Olive oil and so on with Famila & Oila Brand name |
| Golrang Media Institute | The Largest Home Entertainment Company in Iran: TV Series: Shookhi kardam, Vilay e Man, Made in Iran, ... |
| Golrang Electronics Industries (GEIC) | GEIC owns the highest capacity for producing high capacity discs such as DVD-5 & DVD-9 and Blu-ray (25GB & 50GB) products in I.R.I. |
| Tejarat Electronic Kourosh (TEK) | TEK owns E-Commerce branch of Ofogh kourosh also known as Okala. |

== See also ==
- Industry of Iran
- Industrial Development and Renovation Organization of Iran
