= Automotive industry in Iran =

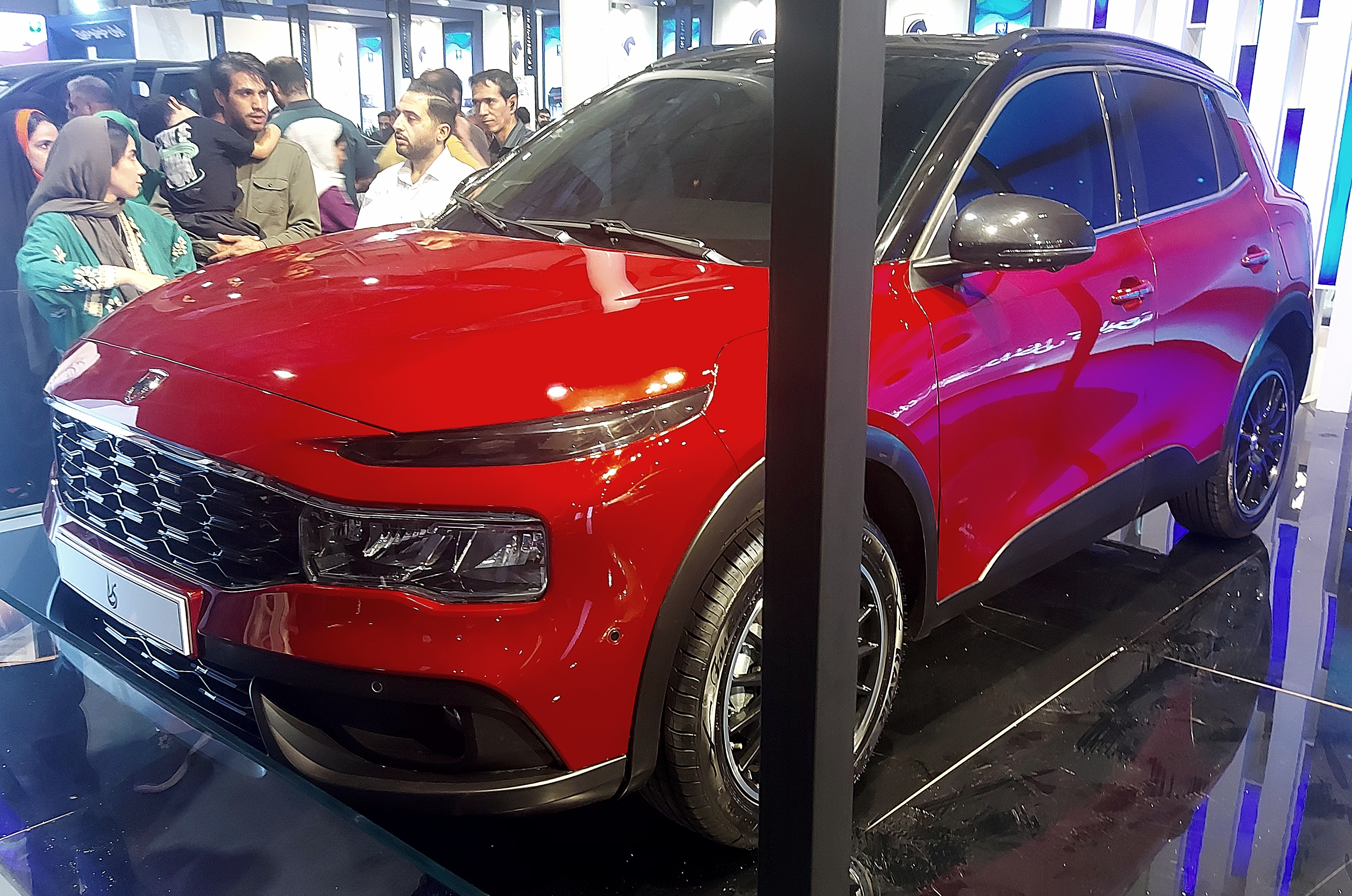
The IKCO Reera, Iran's flagship automobile

Iran’s automotive industry is the third most active industry of the country, after its oil and gas industry, accounting for 10% of Iran's GDP and 4% of the workforce (700,000 people).

Iran developed a significant automotive industry with annual production of up to 200,000 units under the Mohammad Reza Shah Pahlavi's regime. But after the Iranian Revolution of 1979 production drastically decreased due to Iran–Iraq War and international sanctions. Since the early 2000s, automobile production in Iran has grown exponentially. Iran's automobile production crossed the 1 million mark in 2007/2008. As of 2024, Iran is the 13th largest automaker in the world and one of the largest in Asia, with annual production of more than 1.3 million. In 2009, Iran ranked fifth in car production growth standing next to China, Taiwan, Romania and India. According to OICA statistics, production dropped dramatically to under 750,000 automobiles and commercial vehicles in 2013.

As of 2001, there were 13 public and privately owned automakers in Iran, of which two—Iran Khodro and Saipa—accounted for 94% of the total domestic production. Iran Khodro, which produced the most prevalent car brand in the country—the Paykan, which has been replaced in 2005 by the Samand—was still the larger with 61% of the market in 2001, while Saipa contributed 33% of Iran's total production in the same year. Iran Khodro is one of the largest car manufacturers in Asia. It has established joint-ventures with foreign partners on 4 continents.

The Iranian manufacturers currently produces several types of vehicles, including cars, 4WD, trucks, buses, minibuses, and pickup trucks. The sector directly employs about 500,000 people (roughly 2.3% of the workforce), and many more in related industries. About 75% of local output is passenger cars, with pick-ups the next largest category, accounting for around 15%.

In July of 2024, Iran began allowing the import of second-hand Japanese, Korean and European cars, with a limit of one vehicle purchase per citizen national ID card number.

== Historical development ==
First bus imported to Iran (Qajar era)

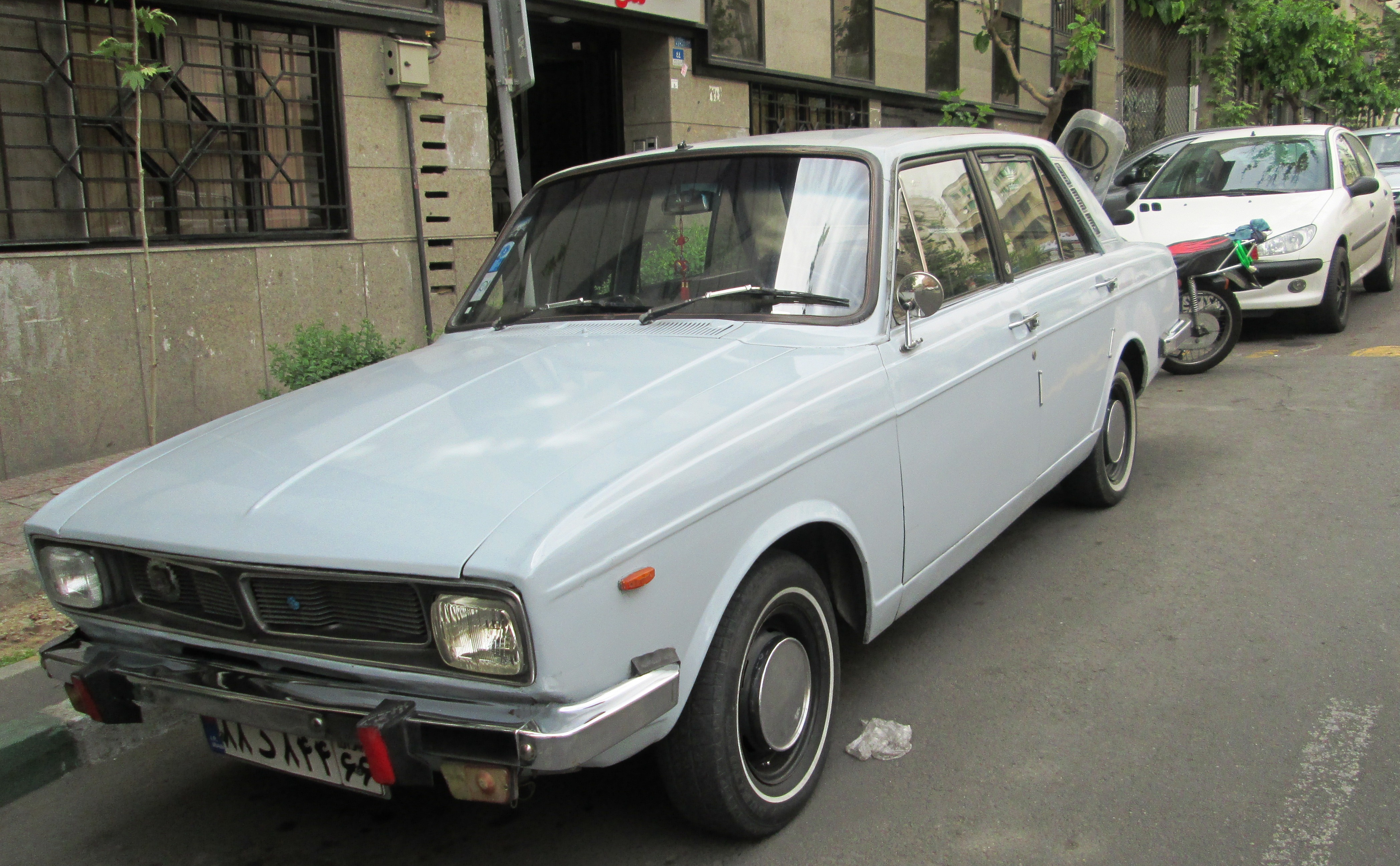
The Paykan Product of Iran National (Current Iran Khodro) was Iran's most popular automobile from its introduction in 1967 to its discontinuation in 2005 And after stopping the production, it still gained a lot of sales and popularity.

In the 1960s, lacking the technical know-how and unable to produce its own automobiles, Iran invited Western firms in order to start a domestic automobile industry. Since then, Iran has developed its domestic industry where it can design and assemble cars on its own, including a new car factory in Kashan. The average operating margin of the five major Iranian automakers dropped by 1% from 13% to 12% in 2011. The seven development phases of Iran's automotive industry have been:

1. Assembly (with Western assistance)	1969–1989
2. Spare Parts Industry Development	1990–present
3. Auto Design	1975–present
4. Mass Production	1975–present
5. Establishing Export Bases	2006 – Present
6. Mass Auto Export	2008–present
7. Development and Use of Domestic Platforms	2012–2016, onward

== Historical production by year ==
Year	Data	0—0.5 million	0.5—1 million	1—1.5 million	1.5—2 million
1970	35,000				
1980	161,000				
1990	44,665				
2000	277,985				
2005	817,200				
2006	904,500				
2007	997,240				
2008	1,051,430				
2009	1,395,421				
2010	1,599,454				
2011	1,648,505				
2012	1,000,890				
2013	743,647				
2014	1,090,846				
2015	982,337				
2016	1,164,710				
2017	1,515,396				
2018	1,342,000				

Production by year

== Market and domestic production ==
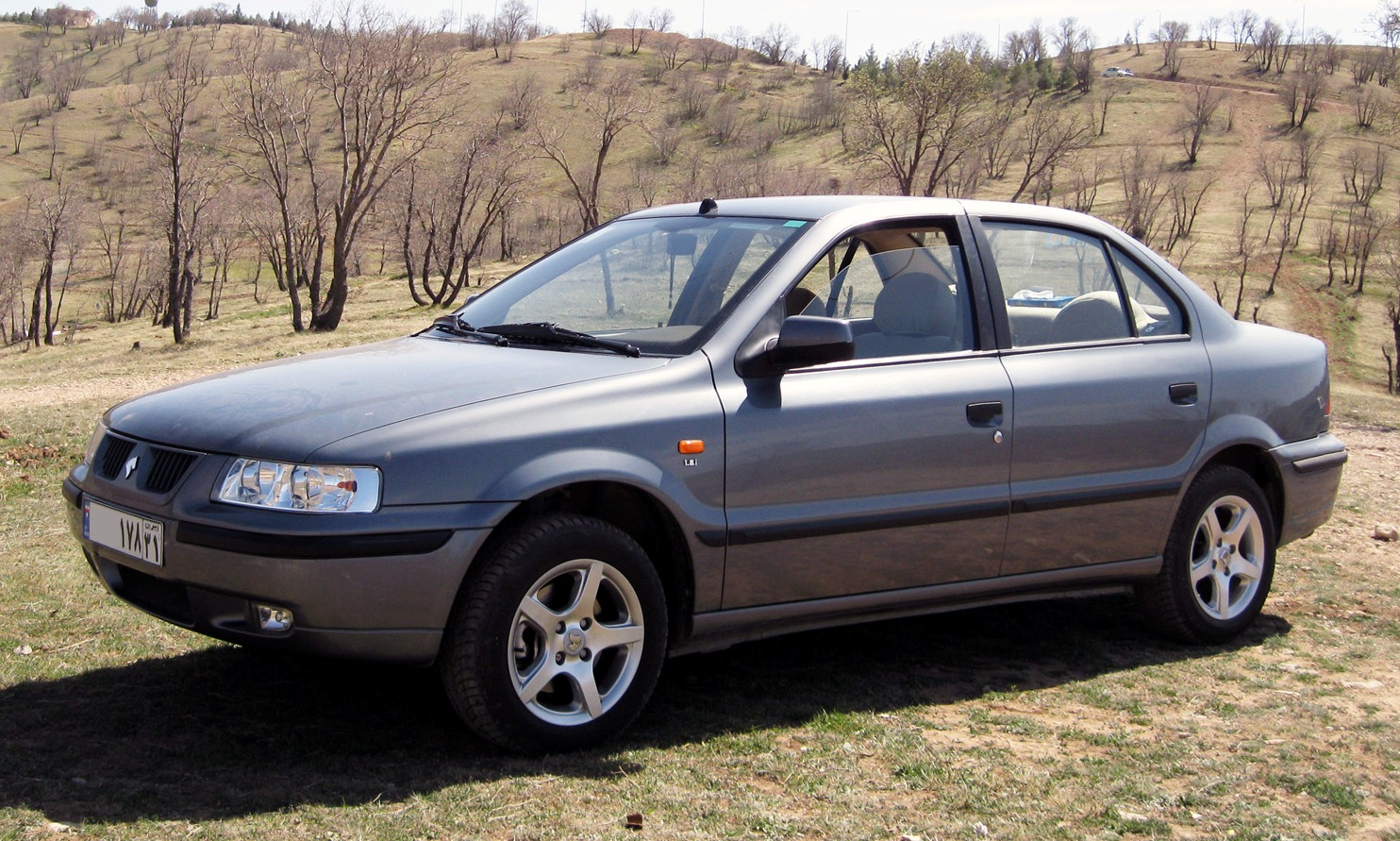
Iran Khodro is the largest car manufacturer in the Middle-East. It has established joint-ventures with foreign partners on 4 continents. The IKCO Samand, Iran's first national car, was sold in many countries.

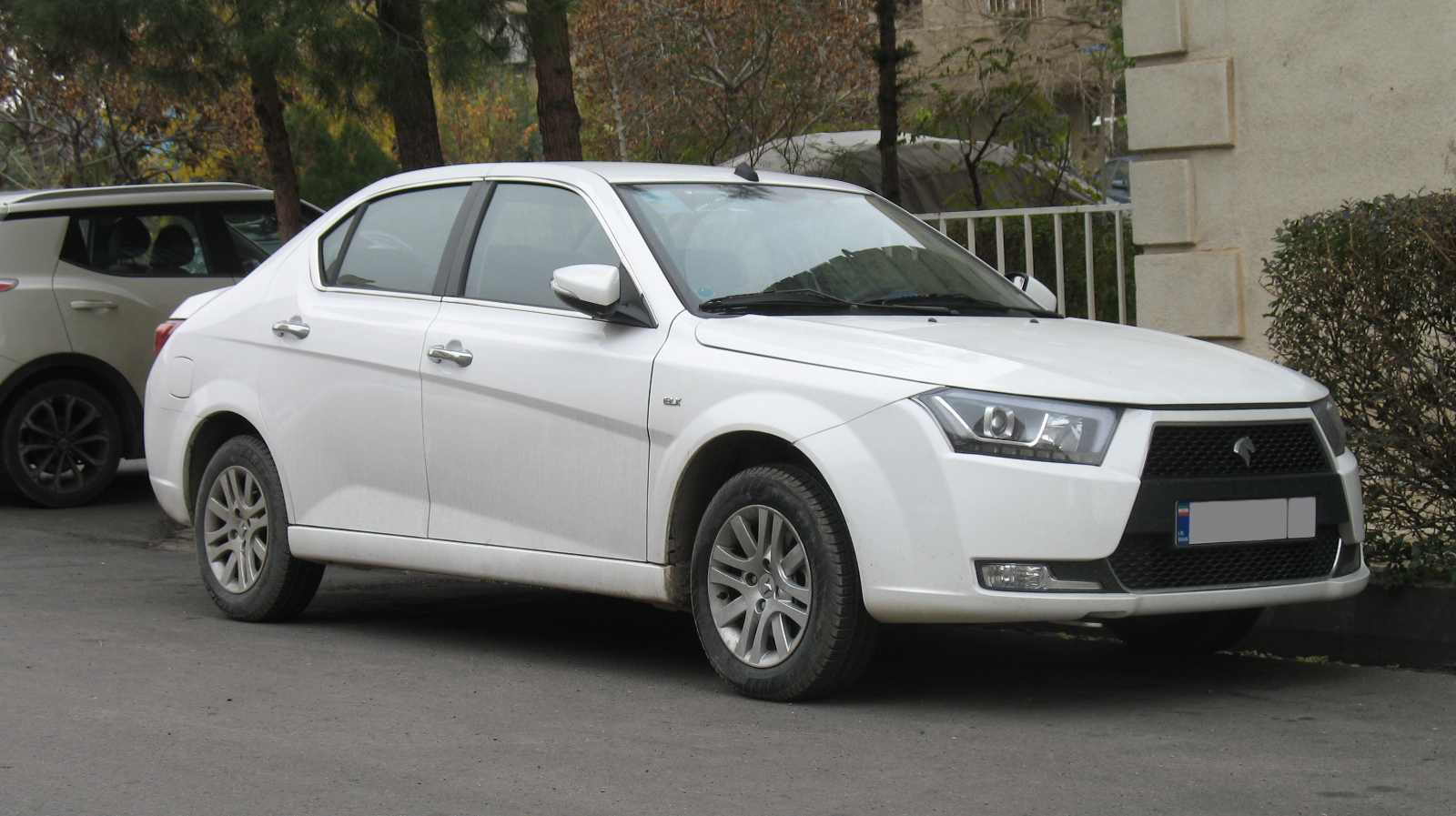
IKCO Dena, model year 2019.

In 2008, IDRO reported that SAIPA accounts for 54%, and Iran Khodro for 46% of the output. Although carmakers are listed on the stock exchange, the government still owns about 40% of both companies. In July 2010, the government sold a further 18% stake in both Iran Khodro and SAIPA for about $2 billion in total, bringing down its participation in both companies to about 20%. In August, both deals were cancelled by the Iranian Privatization Organization. No clear reason was given for the cancellation of the deals, but analysts believe that discontent over the prices at which the blocks were traded is most likely to be the reason. Unofficial estimates put the sector’s debt to Iranian banks as high as 100 trillion rials ($4 billion).

The other car manufacturers, such as Azhitechs, Bahman Group, Rakhsh Khodro, Kerman Motors, Kish Khodro, Raniran, Traktorsazi, Shahab Khodro, and others together produced only 6%. These automakers produce a wide range of automobiles including motorbikes, passenger cars, vans, mini trucks, medium-sized trucks, heavy duty trucks, minibuses, large size buses and other heavy automobiles used in commercial and private activities in the country. Iran Khodro Diesel has a dominant market share (+70%) in bus, truck and van production.

Having a fleet of 7 million passenger cars, buses and trucks, Iran ranked the world’s 16th biggest automaker and one of the largest in Asia in 2006, with annual production above 1 million units and 1.3 million in 2009, resulting in almost 1.5 percent of total world production of vehicles and 1 car per 10 people. Iran's fleet reached 11.5 million cars by 2020 and 14 million by 2014 (half of which are dilapidated).

60% of passenger cars produced in 2008 use natural gas as fuel or are dual-fuel, and the remaining 40% will run on regular gasoline (2008). Some problems faced by the industry are slow deliveries of cars, lack of after sales services and low quality in the production of some cars. Car production in Iran has increased 445% between 1998 and 2008. In July 2013, sanctions imposed by the USA prevented Iranian companies from importing the vehicle parts upon which domestic cars rely; this caused Iran to cede its place to Turkey as the region’s top vehicle manufacturer. Because of sanctions on spare parts by France's Peugeot and Renault, car production in Iran dropped by as much as 40% in 2012 before recovering somewhat in 2014 following the Geneva interim agreement.

More than half of the vehicles in Iran are over 10 years old (2009). The government has sought to upgrade the local fleet and the authorities aim to pull some 200,000 outmoded vehicles off the road each year, underpinning demand. According to estimates the demand stood at 1.5 million vehicles in 2007, which could not be met by the local producers. Auto manufacturing industry's share in gross national product is two percent and Iran's auto production rate in the global markets is 1.7 percent (2008). Previously buyers had been purchasing vehicles outright in cash, but now over half of all new car sales are through finance companies or on lease purchase schemes.

=== Motorcycles ===
There were more than 8 million motorcycles in Iran by 2010, with 1,500 motorcycles getting registered each day. Motorcycles account for 30% of air pollution in Tehran. Domestically manufactured motorcycles conform to Euro 2 emission standards, yet catalyst transducers are not being used. On the other hand, the rest of the world has considered the Euro 5 emission standards for motorcycles.

=== Exports ===
In 2007, Iran car exports stood at around $500 million. Iran car exports reached $1 billion by March 2009. Overall production is expected to rise to 1.13 million units by 2012 ($200 million in exports expected by 2010) and 60,000 units exported by 2013.

== Auto parts ==
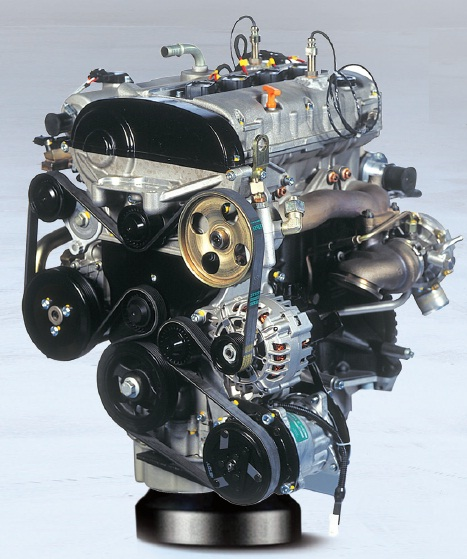
IKCO EF Engines are four-cylinder engines. The EF7 series are designed jointly by Iran Khodro Powertrain Company (IPCO) and F.E.V GmbH of Germany.

Sapco and Sazeh Gostar are the respective purchasing arms of Iran Khodro and Saipa (the two largest Iranian auto manufacturers). The Iranian automotive parts industry consists of approximately 1200 companies (15,000 factories), which include those affiliated to vehicle manufacturers as well as independent firms. The industry consists of two primary sectors: Original Equipment Manufacturing (OEM) suppliers, which produce parts for auto makers, and After-Market Parts Manufacturers (AMPM), which produce replacement parts for vehicles. Over 39 countries purchase Iranian auto parts (2008). As of 2014, 10 tire manufacturing units are operating across the country with a production capacity of 240,000 tons per annum. They meet 70 percent of the domestic tire demand (11 million tires per year). As of 2015, 60% of auto spare parts in the Iranian market are imported from foreign countries. Most cars are produced in Iran under licence from foreign manufacturers and it depends on them for critical imports, ranging from pistons, cylinder heads, valves, starters, alternators, airbags to computer chips (incl. engine control units and sensors). The media has reported that the IRGC is cooperating with the auto industry ( including 32 domestic part makers) to remedy these deficiencies.

Since 2020, Iranian manufacturers are also producing parts such as automotive immobilizers, electronic control units, oxygen sensors, electric seats, electric steering, six-speed automatic transmission, polymeric materials, modulators, injectors, airbags, multimedia, direct current (DC) motors, all types of electrical sensors and digital front amplifier.

=== Research and development ===
There are different ongoing R&D projects both at the governmental and private sectors. These projects research are mostly aimed at local market of Iran and its particular problems. New lines of locally designed and manufactured diesel, gasoline and dedicated CNG engines are being developed. There are also some research being done on hybrid and electric vehicles for the future Iranian market. In addition to this nanotechnology is being researched for introduction into production lines in order to improve the quality standards and customer satisfaction by offering anti-bacterial seats, anti-scratch paint, hydrophobic glass panes, maintenance-free air filters, anti-stain dashboards, nano-catalytic converters and nano-diamond containing lubricating oils.

In 2011, the Nanotechnology Initiative Council announced plans to export to Lebanon a series of ‘home-made’ nano-based engine oils manufactured by the Pishgaman–Nano-Aria Company (PNACO); these nano-based oils reduce engine erosion, fuel consumption and engine temperature. In 2009, researchers at Isfahan University of Technology developed a strong but light nanosteel as resistant to corrosion as stainless steel for use in road vehicles but also potentially in aircraft, solar panels and other products.

As of 2016, Iran had no known R&D project in the important field of autonomous cars.

== Foreign direct investment and imports ==
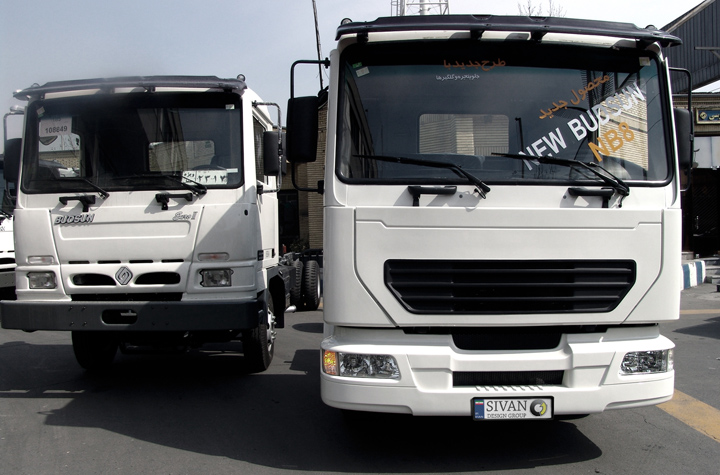
Saipa Diesel New Budsun NB8 (right) vs. Saipa Diesel Budsun (left)

There are over 25 automakers in Iran, actively producing both light and heavy vehicles. They are in joint venture with companies such as Dongfeng (China), Peugeot, Citroen (France), Volkswagen (Germany), Nissan (Japan), Toyota (Japan), Kia Motors (South Korea), Proton (Malaysia), and Chery (China). Many other established producers of light and heavy vehicles such as Renault (France), BMW, Mercedes Benz (Germany), Daewoo, and Hyundai (South Korea) have emerged since 1991. Italian carmaker Fiat has also announced plans to begin production of its Siena sedan in Iran in 2008.

Chery Automobile (China) in August 2007 entered into a US$370m joint venture with Iran Khodro, Iran to produce cars for West and South Asian markets. Chery Automobile is to hold 30% of the venture, and Khodro will hold 49%. Solitac, a Canadian front company, is to hold the remaining 21% of the venture. The factory will be in the Iranian city of Babol. Anhui Ankai Automobile (also of China) signed a deal in January 2008 with ARG-Diesel Iran to supply it with 600 buses, valued at €51.35m. The deal is to be complete by October 2008.

Iran annually needs some 4,000 buses for its domestic transportation. Since the 1970s, Iran has been producing a number of different buses, such as German Mercedes and MAN as well as Swedish Scania and Volvo that it has exported throughout Asia. Daewoo Bus Corp. and an Iranian automaker Ardebil Sabalan Khodrow-Maywan have teamed up to build buses in Iran. The plant, which is slated to be completed by March 2010, would have a production capacity of 2,000 buses per year and would produce some 800 city and intercity buses in the 18 months after its inauguration. Based on the agreement, the engines and gearboxes would be manufactured in South Korea. Production would increasingly shift to Iran, where about 60 percent of the parts would be made.

Since 2016 and the lifting of the international sanctions, nearly 40 foreign automakers, including Peugeot, Mercedes, and Toyota, are considering using Iran as a hub for their ME and regional exports.

=== Imports ===
Car imports have risen, from $184 million in 2002 to $1.5 billion in 2007. In 2006, the government lowered the automotive import tariff levels to 90 percent for light weight vehicles and since then a huge influx of imported vehicles has been witnessed in the country. The tariff level for import of heavy vehicles is even lower at 20 percent, due to low levels of local production and high demand. As a result, various overseas brands are being presently imported into Iran.

Following the lifting of international sanctions, French car manufacturer Renault imported over 93,000 cars (fully built and CKD units) to Iran in 2016.

PSA covers 30% of the Iranian market, while Renault's share is 5%.

== Fuel rationing ==
As of 2015, Iran has 3,200 gas stations for 1.5 million automobiles. Demand is supported by the fixing of fuel prices well below market levels. There are two pricing schemes for petrol, one subsidized the other not. Each month, qualified vehicle owners are allocated a specific number of subsidized liters of petrol (taxis have a significantly higher allocation). The cost of regular unsubsidized petrol in Iran is IR7,000/liter (approximately 37 US cents/liter) and premium grade petrol IR3000/liter, whereas the subsidized equivalents go for IR4,000/liter and IR5,000/liter, respectively. The nation's abundant oil reserves have enabled the government to keep prices low (Iran is the second-largest exporter in OPEC). However, low prices have encouraged wasteful consumption and the smuggling of petrol into neighbouring countries such as Turkey, Pakistan and Afghanistan. Some 1.8 billion liters of oil products worth 10 trillion rials ($1 billion) are smuggled out of Iran per annum.

Given Iran's limited refining capacity, there has been a shortfall in petroleum products in recent years, requiring Iran to import an estimated 100,000 barrels per day (16,000 m^{3}/d) in 2006/07. As a result, there is a recognition among many policymakers of the need to raise prices, and gradual increases have been implemented. However, these have tended to lag the prevailing rate of inflation, and given that raising petrol prices is politically difficult the provision of cheap fuel is likely to persist in the medium term, encouraging the purchase of vehicles. The government was nevertheless forced to take action in June 2007 when it announced both a petrol increase to 12 cents/litre and the imposition of fuel rationing, much to the chagrin of vehicle owners. The policy, which allocates 120 litres maximum per month (following revisions in December) to private car owners, will run until end-2008/09.

=== CNG ===
In 2008 and 2009, Iranian government spent over 3 billion dollars on CNG infrastructure as part of its plan to convert its fuel policy from gasoline to CNG. Iran, with the world’s second-largest natural gas reserves after Russia, in 2011 became the world leader in natural gas vehicles with some 2.9 million on the road, narrowly edging Pakistan, which is trailed by Argentina, Brazil and India, respectively. (The United States, which does not subsidize and promote the fuel like other countries do, ranks 16th.) Iran has 1,262 vehicles per refueling station compared with 856 vehicles per refueling station in Pakistan.

== Prospects ==
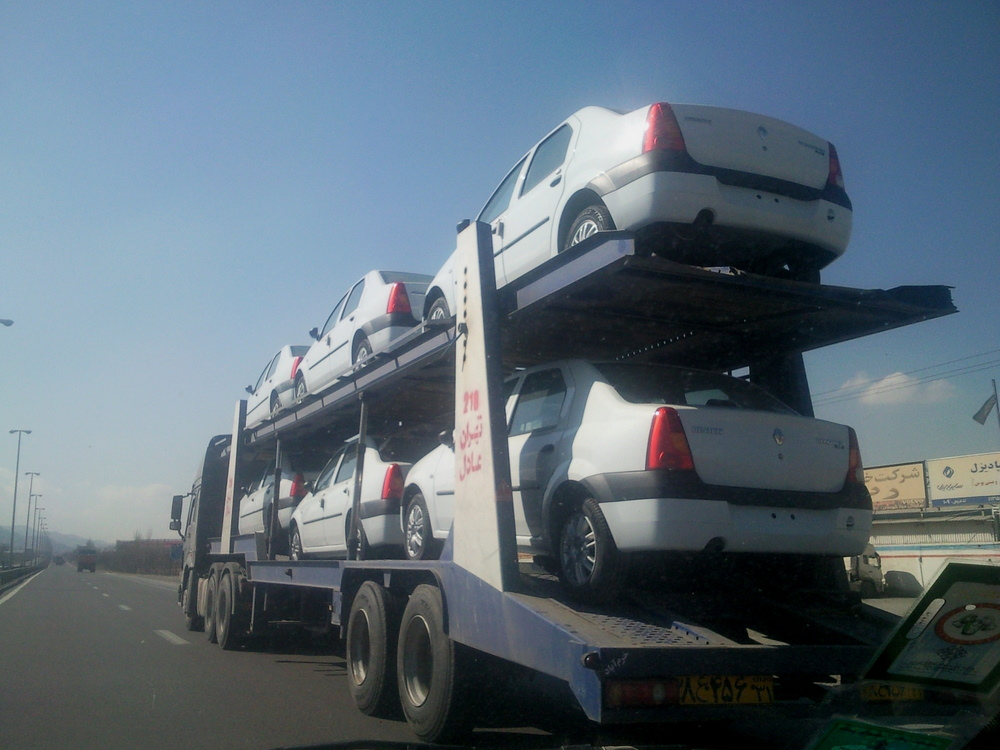
Newly manufactured Renault Logan vehicles being transported by truck

Iran Automotive Forecast (Source: EIU)	2007	2008	2009	2010	2011	2012
New passenger car registrations ('000)	1,294	1,447	1,563	1,669	1,806	1,962
Stock of passenger cars (per 1,000 population)	94	107	119	133	146	159

Like other sectors, the automotive industry is suffering from a lack of foreign direct investment (FDI) and capital imports. The privatization process is moving slowly (2008). Some 80% of state-owned firms were due to be privatized over the ten years to 2014, further to an amendment to Article 44 of the Constitution in 2004. In May 2014, Tasnim News Agency quoted Abdollah Pouri Hosseini, the head of the Iran Privatization Organization, as saying that Iran would be privatizing 186 state-run companies in the new year (beginning 21 March 2014 in Iran). He said that 27 of these companies had a market value each in excess of US$400 million. In 2010, the government reduced its participation in Iran Khodko and Saipa to about 20% but the deals were annulled the same year by the Iranian Privatization Organization.

International sanctions, high inflation, exacerbated by fuel price hikes, and dampened consumer demand have depressed growth in the passenger car segment, but industrial growth coupled with infrastructural development is spurring demand in the commercial vehicles segment. The sanctions have also created difficulties for the imports of spare parts and increased the cost for car manufacturers. To make matters worse, the factory sale prices of cars, which are set by the government every year, have changed very little since 2006. Experts also believe that the removal of subsidies is likely to have an adverse impact on the profitability of the automotive sector until 2013.

The sanctions imposed in 2013 hit exports particularly hard, which had doubled to about 50,000 cars between 2011 and 2012. This prompted IKCO to announce plans in October 2013 to begin selling 10 000 cars a year to the Russian Federation. Traditional export markets include Syria, Iraq, Algeria, Egypt, Sudan, Venezuela, Pakistan, Cameroon, Ghana, Senegal and Azerbaijan.

According to a 2015-survey, car production in Iran will increase by 28% increase following the conclusion of the Joint Comprehensive Plan of Action.

In 2015, the government made loans up to $7120 available for purchase of domestic cars (with an interest rate of between 16-18%). The payback period is a maximum seven years or 84 installments.

== See also ==
- International Rankings of Iran in Transportation
- Economy of Iran
- Transport in Iran
- Industry of Iran

== Sources ==
This article incorporates text from a free content work. Licensed under CC-BY-SA IGO 3.0. Text taken from UNESCO Science Report: towards 2030, UNESCO.
