= Iran Chamber of Commerce, Industries, Mines & Agriculture =

- اتاق بازرگانی، صنایع، معادن و کشاورزی تهران
- Abbreviation: ICCIMA
- Formation: 1884; 142 years ago
- Legal status: Not-for-profit organisation
- Purpose: Chambers of commerce in Iran
- Location(s): Taleghani Street; Tehran; Iran
- Region served: Worldwide
- Members: 20,000
- Head: Samad Hassanzadeh
- Website: iccima.ir

The Iran Chamber of Commerce, Industries, Mines and Agriculture (ICCIMA) is a non-profit non-governmental institution, established to facilitate economic growth and development in the country. ICCIMA is a forum in the field of industries, mines and agriculture.

== Duties ==
ICCIMA's main functions are:

- facilitating cooperation among business persons and owners of industries, mines and agricultural units,
- advising in the implementation of relevant state laws and regulations,
- providing advisory opinions to the Government on commercial and economic issues,
- establishing relations with chambers of commerce in other countries. As of 2010, Iran’s Chamber of Commerce had relations with 40 international chambers,
- establishing joint chambers or committees of commerce, according to the general policies of the Government,
- seeking to identify export markets for Iranian products and services,
- creating a suitable entrepreneurship environment and removing business obstacles,
- settling through arbitration, domestic or international commercial disputes, by establishing the ICCIMA Arbitration Center.

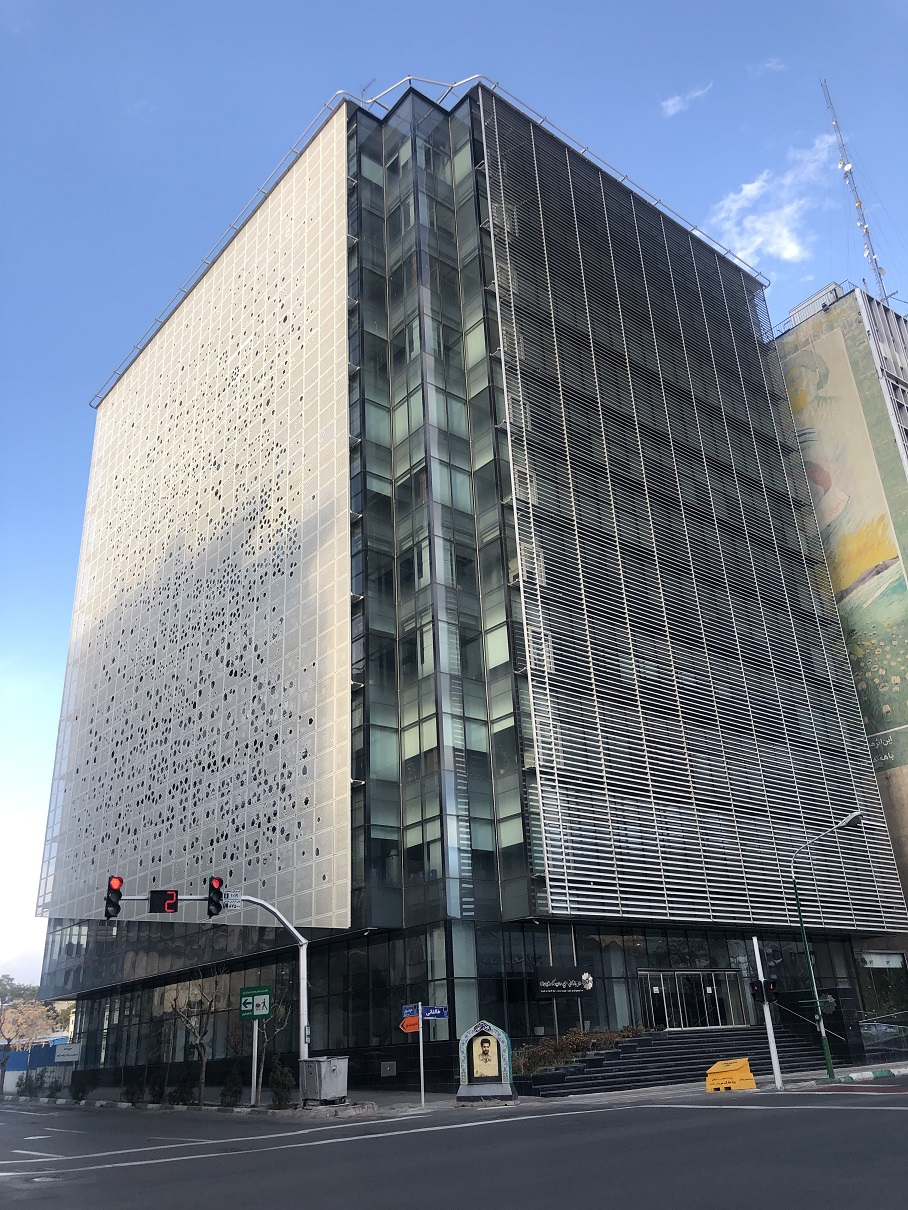
Iran Chamber of Commerce main building

== See also ==
- Venture capital in Iran
- Trade Promotion Organization (Iran)
- Economy of Iran
- Industry of Iran
- Mining in Iran
- Agriculture in Iran
- Taxation in Iran
- Iranian labor law
- Foreign Direct Investment in Iran
- Iran's international rankings in economy
- List of major economic laws in Iran
- Licensing and franchising in Iran
- Ministry of Industries and Mines (Iran)
- Bank of Industry and Mine
