= Foreign direct investment in Iran =

Investment in Iran

Foreign direct investment in Iran (FDI) refers to investment by foreign individuals or companies in businesses operating in the country. Net FDI inflows to Iran are recorded in the World Bank's World Development Indicators, using data from the International Monetary Fund, UN Trade and Development, and official national sources. It has been hindered by unfavorable or complex operating requirements and by international sanctions.

In 2024, net foreign direct investment inflows to Iran amounted to approximately US$1.45 billion, according to UN Trade and Development.

== Amounts ==
According to the United Nations Conference on Trade and Development (UNCTAD), foreign direct investment (FDI) in Iran hit a new record in 2010 and surpassed 3.6 billion dollars despite sanctions imposed on the Islamic Republic. The Government of Iran says planned FDI in 2011 was $4.3 billion and planned FDI will reach $8–10 billion in 2012–13. However, UNCTAD later reported that FDI inflow in Iran was $3.05 billion in 2013, while Iran's FDI in other countries (i.e. outflow FDI) was $380 million.

Bushehr province and Khuzestan province enjoy the highest volume of foreign investment which mostly goes for oil and gas sectors. In 2012, the provinces of Fars, Gilan, Tehran, Kerman, Mazandaran and West Azerbaijan ranked first to sixth place in attracting foreign investment in the country.

According to the government of Iran, Iran needs up to $300 billion in foreign direct investment to meet the objectives of its Five-Year Economic Development Plan (2010–2015), and reach eight percent economic growth rate. Turning to "Vision 2025", the plan has set an investment target of $3.7 trillion within two decades (2005–2025) of which $1.3 trillion should be in the form of foreign investment.

== Companies ==
The Organization for Investment, Economic and Technical Assistance of Iran (OIETAI) is responsible for receiving and processing all foreign investment applications. OIETAI is also responsible for approving overseas Iranian investments. In other words, the organization is in charge of consolidating and implementing two-way foreign investment flows. According to Iranian President Rouhani cooperation with Iran is on the condition that foreign companies participate in joint investments, technology programs, and exporting from Iran.

As of 2012, 400 foreign companies are directly investing in Iran. Among developed nations, the most active investors have been Germans, Norwegian, British, French, Japanese, Russian, South Korean, Swedish, and Swiss companies.

=== Front men ===
In 2015, The Economist and The Wall Street Journal reported that American companies (incl. Apple Inc. and Hewlett-Packard) are using local (Iranian) front men to seal deals in Iran. In the oil and banking business some "prime contracts" have already been signed while Iran is still under "international sanctions". Boeing, Microsoft, Siemens, BP, Chevron, Gazprom, Eni, Samsung, Renault. Peugeot, GM are also returning to Iran.

== Economic profile ==
Iran is a member of the World Bank's Multilateral Investment Guarantee Agency. Iran has more than 50 signed-bilateral investment treaties with other countries.

=== Natural resources ===
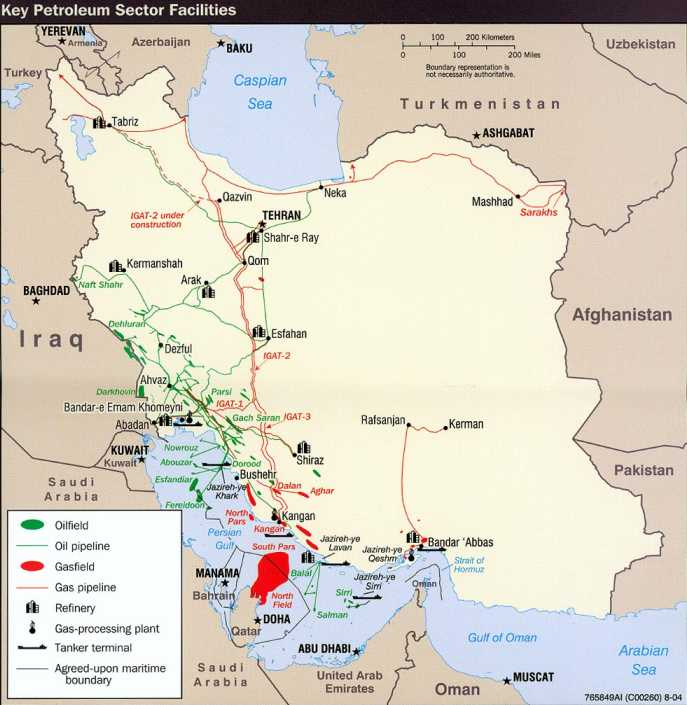
Iran holds 10% of the world's proven oil reserves and 15% of its gas. It is OPEC's second largest exporter and the world's fourth oil producer.

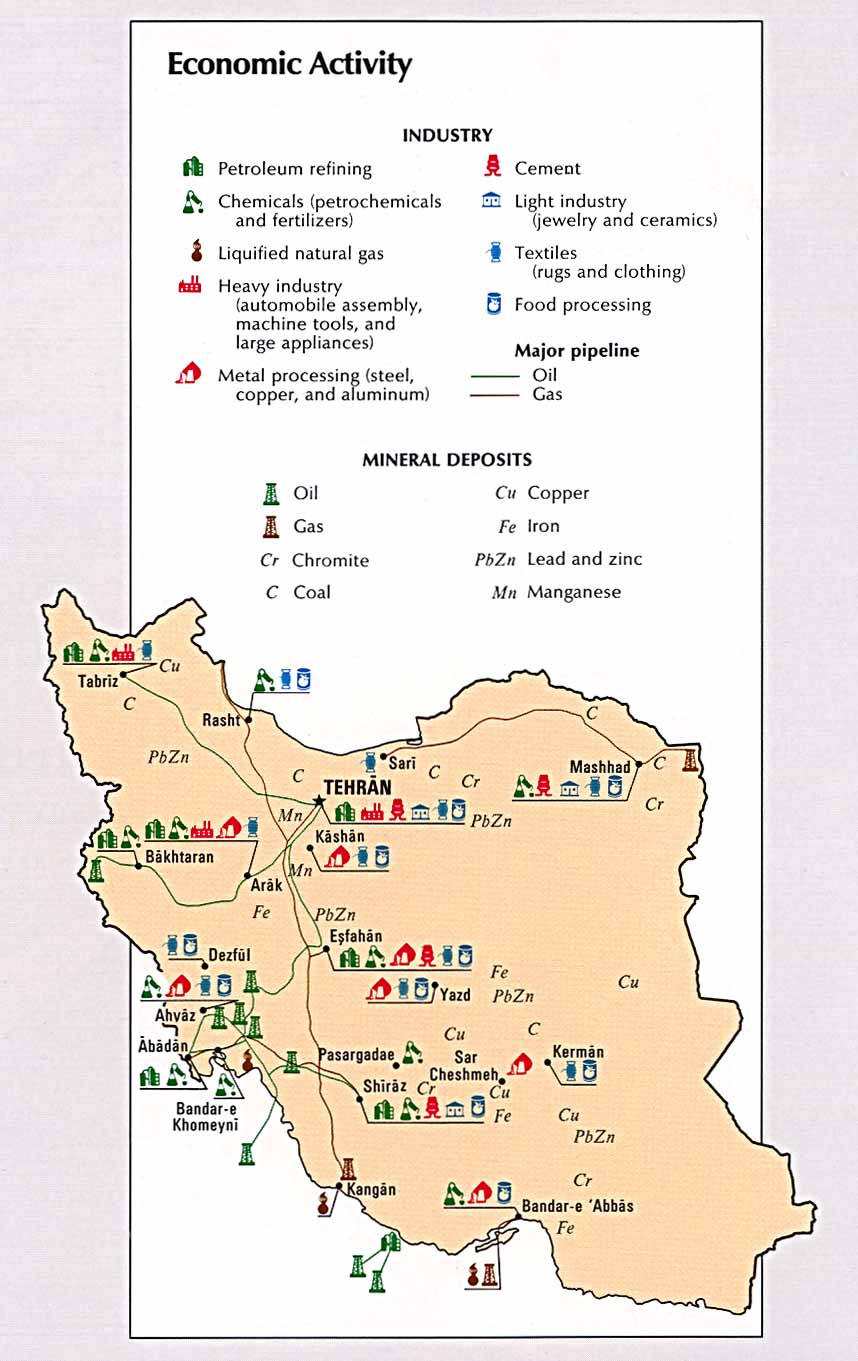
Iran's industry and mining map

Iran is OPEC's second largest oil producer. It has approximately 9% of world oil reserves (some 94 billion barrels). It has the second largest reserves of natural gas in the world at some 812 trillion cubic feet. Iran is considered an energy superpower. Iran also possesses enormous mineral resources, including coal, copper, iron, zinc and gold. This has spawned a number of processing industries, particularly steel. Iran is already the third largest producer of copper in the world.

=== Competitive advantages ===
Iran has made the development of non-oil exports a priority. The country has the advantage of a broad domestic industrial base, technology an educated and motivated workforce, cheap labor and energy resources and geographical location, which gives it access to an estimated population of some 300 million people in Caspian markets, Persian Gulf states and countries further east. Iran has the consumer potential of Turkey, the oil reserves of Saudi Arabia, the natural gas reserves of Russia, and the mineral reserves of Australia. Iran's area roughly equals that of the United Kingdom, France, Spain, and Germany combined. Iran has a diverse climate which makes it suitable for a wide range of agricultural products.

== Laws concerning foreign companies ==
Generally speaking, Iran has two types of laws concerning foreign companies. The first are laws that address issues concerning foreign companies directly such as the Foreign Investment Promotion and Protection Act (FIPPA) and the second are general laws of which certain articles or by-laws address foreign companies, for instance the Taxation Law and the Labor Law. Iran's environment is protected by strict laws and the Department of the Environment is in charge of evaluating the impact of the projects and their monitoring.

General laws and regulations regarding foreign business in Iran could be regrouped under the following categories:

- Contract work – A foreign company is allowed to be involved in contractual work in Iran. Such work may be performed either directly by the foreign company or through a registered branch in Iran. Branch offices in Iran do not have the separate legal status enjoyed by LLCs, and the parent company is responsible for the actions of the branch office. For legal and tax purposes, opening a representative office in Iran, by itself, is not considered foreign direct investment. Establishing and setting up a legal presence in the Iranian market requires a local advisor who can provide a step-by-step advisory service regarding incorporation, office rental, recruitment, staff, business contracts, customs, and the laws in general. CMS Cameron McKenna is among the first major international law firms to open office in Iran.
- Direct sales – Most foreign companies are involved in direct sales to Iranian customers through letters of credit and, occasionally on the basis of Usance.
- Investments – In accordance with the terms of the Foreign Investment Promotion and Protection Act (FIPPA), foreign companies may invest in newly established factories and industries. Foreign companies are allowed to own 100 per cent of the businesses.

=== Investment by natural persons of foreign nationality ===
In 2006, The net worth of Iranian citizens abroad's abroad was $1.3 trillion. In 2000, the Iran Press Service reported that Iranian expatriates had invested between $200 and $400 billion in the United States, Europe, and China, but almost nothing in Iran. In Dubai, Iranian expatriates have invested an estimated $200 billion (2006).

According to the Civil Code, foreign nationals will, subject to the existence of a treaty on reciprocity, enjoy the same rights and privileges of Iranians. The companies formed by such foreign nationals will be of Iranian nationality and subject to the same laws which regulate the activities of Iranian companies.

=== Foreign investment in the framework of the Commercial Code ===
The Iranian Commercial Code is divided into four parts:

1. merchant and trade activities,
2. trade companies,
3. negotiable instruments,
4. contracts and bankruptcy.

Foreign nationals can, in the framework of the Commercial Code and subject to the observance of the relevant procedures, form and register companies in Iran. Iran's Commercial Code does not differentiate between Iranian and foreign stock holders of Iranian companies. In other words, there is no restriction regarding the nationality of those who want to establish companies in Iran. In this context, foreign exchange restrictions are equally applied to Iranian and foreign investors. Such companies, however, do not enjoy the privileges set out in FIPPA (see below).

==== Company types ====
There are seven types of juridical entity or company which can be established under the Iranian Commercial Code as follows:

1. Joint-stock company may be either a public company (Sherkat Sahami Am) or a private company (Sherkat Sahami Khass)
2. Limited liability company (LLC) (Sherkat ba Masouliyat Mahdoud)
3. General partnership (Sherkat Tazamoni)
4. Limited partnership (Sherkat Mokhtalet Gheyr Sahami)
5. Joint stock partnership (Sherkat Mokhtalet Sahami)
6. Proportional liability partnership (Sherkat Nesbi)
7. Manufacturing / Consumer Co-operative (Sherkat Ta’avoni va Masraf)

From among all these different types, joint-stock company, in which the capital is divided by shares, is the most common and acceptable type of company which can be recommended to foreign investors.

=== FIPPA ===
Provisions of the 2002 Act entitled Foreign Investment Promotion and Protection Act (FIPPA) include:

- Allowing foreign investment in all sectors opened to Iranian private companies.
- A review of the definition of "Foreign Investor" to include Iranian expatriates provided that their investment capital originates from abroad.
- Allowing repatriation of local sales related profits in addition to export-related profits in hard currency at the current official exchange rate.
- Fair compensation in case of nationalization. If an act of the government disrupts the business activity, the government will be under obligation to make payments for any loan installments that are due on behalf of the project company.
- FIPPA allows for international arbitration in legal disputes. There are two major arbitral institutions in Iran: the Tehran Regional Arbitration Centre (TRAC) and the Arbitration Centre of the Tehran Commercial Chamber.
- The establishment of a maximum 45-day period for the processing of individual foreign investment applications.

For the first time, project financing schemes such as buy back agreements and BOT projects (only under an operator status) are specifically covered under the foreign investment law. Under the FIPPA, any foreign natural or legal person importing capital in Iran will enjoy the benefits and privileges of this law as long as:

- The investment leads to economic growth, promotes technology, promotes quality of products, increases employment opportunities, increases exports and entering the international markets.
- The investment does not jeopardize national security and public interests or harm the environment or interrupt national economy or disrupt products of domestic investments.
- The investment does not involve the granting of any special rights resulting in a monopoly.
- The value ratio of goods and services produced by aggregate of foreign investments does not exceed 25% in each economic sector and in each economic branch shall not exceed 35%. FIPPA will be applicable based on the nationality of the Foreign Capital as opposed to the investor. As long as the capital comes from foreign sources, any one importing it will be eligible for FIPPA protection including Iranians residing in Iran or abroad.

Starting in 2014, foreign investors, who establish production lines in Iran and export 30 percent of their products, will be entitled to tax exemptions (up to 50%).

== Potential approaches to the market ==
=== Buy-back ===
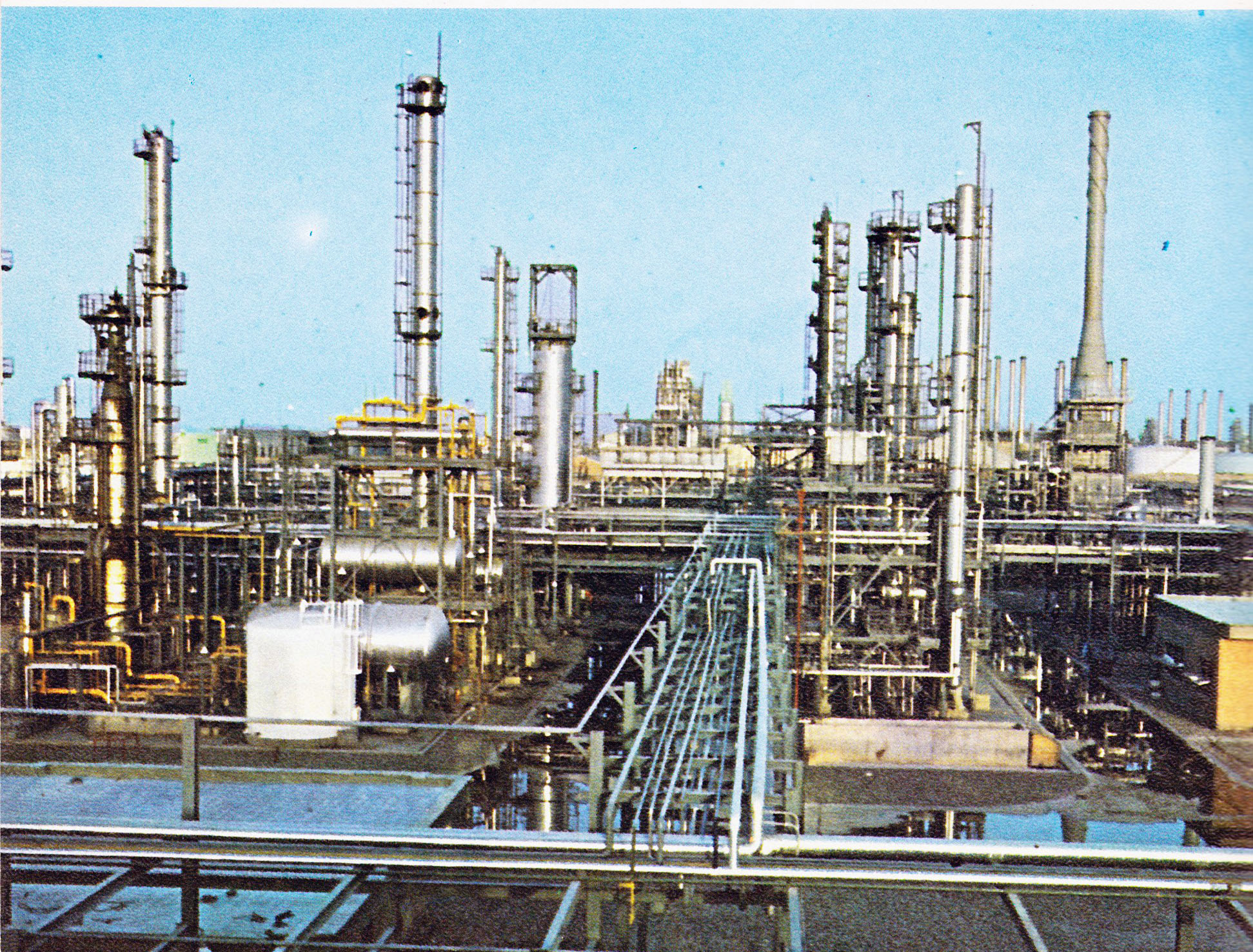
Abadan Petrochemical Complex

In the 1990s and early 2000s, some indirect oilfield development agreements were made with foreign firms. Buyback contracts in the oil sector, for instance, were arranged in which the contractor funded all the investments, and then received remuneration from the National Iranian Oil Company (NIOC) in the form of an allocated production share, then transferred operation of the field to NIOC after a set number of years, at which time the contract was completed.

In February 2007 the government unveiled its new buyback-contract formula, which significantly extended the length of the contracts to as long as 20 years. The buy-back scheme is a formula used by the Iranian government to attract foreign investment. Following the end of the Iran–Iraq War in 1988, Iran faced a major problem: it needed foreign investment if it did not want to lose its vital income from the oil and gas industry, yet its revolutionary ideology and Constitution forbid granting "concessions". A compromise solution was found in 1989 with the First Five-Year Economic, Social and Cultural Development Plan. Under Note 29 of the said plan, the Iranian government is allowed to employ "buybacks" in its effort to meet the industrial and mineral needs in connection with exports, production and investment. Put in layman's terms, a buy-back transaction is a method of trade where plants, machinery, production equipment and technology is supplied (by a domestic or foreign private firm), in exchange for the goods that will be produced directly or indirectly by means of such facilities.

==== The Iranian (or Integrated) Petroleum Contract (IPC) ====
Some of the main criticisms of the buyback contracts include lack of flexibility of cost recovery and in some cases, the NIOC's limited expertise to reverse field decline rates in comparison to the International Oil Company (IOC) that developed the field. The Integrated Petroleum Contract (IPC) will require the IOCs to fulfill Iran's local content requirement, which will be 51% of the contract and transfer of technology. IPCs will be offered for work on somewhere between 34 and 74 oil fields and could last for the duration of a field's life. In 2013 Iran also announced for the first time since the Iranian revolution of 1979, the offering of production sharing contracts (PSCs) for the most complicated and difficult projects, such as deep-water wells in the Caspian Sea (the details of which will be revealed in December 2015 in London).

=== Build-Operate-Transfer (BOT) ===
Recent regulations have introduced the Build–operate–transfer (BOT) scheme for Iranian projects. This is a rather new possibility in the Iranian market. In this scheme, the foreign partner invests in one project, which is then operated for a certain period of time by the foreign investor before it is fully transferred to the Iranian government. Iranian authorities are showing some flexibility regarding the BOT, which could potentially pave the way for more foreign investment in the market.

== Free trade zones and special economic zones ==
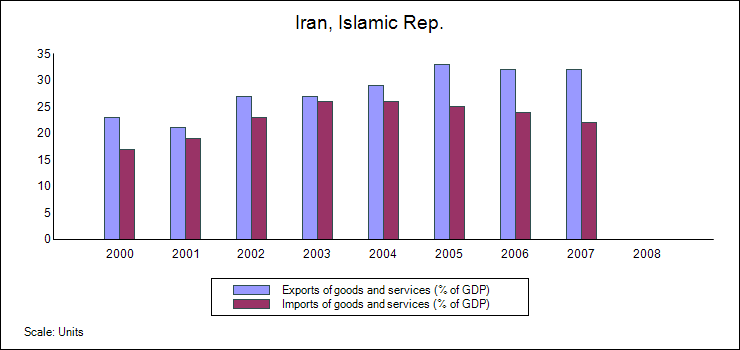
Iran's trade balance (2000–2007)

Iran's interest in free zones can be traced back to the 1970s.

=== Advantages ===
Free-trade (FTZ) and special economic zones (SEZ) have been established to provide additional investment incentives such as:

- 20 years tax-exemption (15 years, before 2014);
- no entry visa requirement;
- 100% foreign ownership possible;
- flexible employment regulations;
- flexible monetary & banking services;
- extended legal guarantees & protection.

=== Locations ===
As of January 2010, there were six free-trade zones (FTZ) and 16 special economic zones (SEZ) in Iran. More FTZ and SEZ are planned in Iran.

Name	Authority in charge	Type	Location
Anzali		Free-trade zone	
Chabahar		Free-trade zone	Chabahar
Kish		Free-trade zone	Kish Island
Arvand		Free-trade zone	Khorramshahr
Aras		Free-trade zone	East Azerbaijan
Qeshm		Free-trade zone	Qeshm Island
Maku		Free-trade zone	Maku
Imam Khomeini International Airport		Free-trade zone	Tehran
Bushehr		Special economic zone	Bushehr
Lorestan		Special economic zone	
Sirjan		Special economic zone	
Sarakhs Special Economic Zone		Special economic zone	Sarakhs
Payam	Payam Aviation	Special economic zone	Karaj
Salafchegan	Astan Quds Razavi	Special economic zone	
Persian Gulf Mines and Metals	National Iranian Steel Company	Special economic zone	
Persian Gulf Shipbuilding	ISOICO	Special economic zone	Bandar Abbas
Arge-e-Jadid		Special economic zone	
PSEEZ	NIOC	Special economic zone	Bushehr
Petrochemical Special Economic Zone	NIPC/Petzone	Special economic zone	Mahshahr
Shiraz Electric and Electronics	IDRO	Special economic zone	Shiraz
Yazd Textile Industries		Special economic zone	Yazd
Bandar Amirabad Behshahr		Special economic zone	
Bandar Bushehr		Special economic zone	Bushehr
Shaheed Rajaee	Shaheed Rajaee Port Authority	Special economic zone	Bandar Abbas

== Outward FDI ==
Iran has made substantial investments abroad. The main agencies in charge are the Iran Foreign Investments Company (FDI) and the Central Bank of Iran (Forex). Broadly speaking, these investments can be categorized as FDI and foreign portfolio investments:

Outward FDI include:

- Joint car factories abroad (e.g. Syria, Azerbaijan, Senegal, Belarus, Venezuela)
- Various joint petrochemical plants
- Various power plants

Portfolio investments include:

- National Development Fund portfolio investments abroad.
- Foreign exchange reserves held abroad (see also: Iranian frozen assets)

Partial ownership in:

- Daimler Benz (sold after its merger with Chrysler)
- Thyssen Krupp (Germany)
- Eurodif (see also: Nuclear program of Iran)
- Shah Deniz gas filed in the Caspian Sea
- Oil and gas fields in the North Sea (UK)
- Various hotels, hospitals and agricultural enterprises, mostly in the MENA and Africa regions.
- Skyscraper in Manhattan, New York (seized)
- All embassies and many commercial buildings belonging to the state including banks (e.g. Naftiran Intertrade in Switzerland)
- Oil pipelines in the ME, including in Israel (see also: Transport in Iran)

Besides, Iranians citizens and Iranian citizens abroad, as individuals, have made substantial investments in Dubai (e.g. real estate, trading companies) and hold significant portfolio investments in various companies throughout Europe, China and the United States. Wealthy Iranians, companies and state-backed buyers will invest up to $8.5 billion in overseas real estate over the next five-to-10 years (2016).

== See also ==
- Economy of Iran
- National Development Fund – Iran's sovereign wealth fund
- Asalouyeh
- Iran's outward FDI in oil fields
- Investment promotion agency
- List of Iranian companies
- Privatization in Iran
- Tehran Stock Exchange
- Iran Chamber of Commerce Industries and Mines – Including information on commercial dispute resolution
- Iran International Exhibitions Company
- Organization of Investment Economic and Technical Assistance of Iran
- Trade Promotion Organization of Iran
- Government of Iran
- Next Eleven – list of countries having a high potential of becoming the world's largest economies in the 21st century by Goldman Sachs
- EU-Iran Forum
- Foreign portfolio investment in Iran
- Licensing and franchising in Iran
- Venture capital in Iran
- Technology start-ups in Iran
- FDI in Iran's automotive industry
- FDI in Iran's construction industry
- FDI in Iran's tourism industry
- FDI in Iran's ICT
- FDI in Iran's mining industry
- FDI in Iran's agriculture
- FDI in Iran's railways
- FDI in Iran's power generation industry
- FDI in Iran's healthcare industry

== Bibliography ==
Books

- Ayse, Valentine; Nash, Jason John; Leland, Rice (January 2013). The Business Year 2013: Iran. London, U.K.: The Business Year. ISBN 978-1-908180-11-7. Archived from the original on 27 March 2015.
- Nash, Jason John; Sasmaz, Aytng (January 2011). The Business Year 2011: Iran. London, U.K.: The Business Year. ISBN 978-1-908180-00-1. Archived from the original on 17 April 2014.

Investment guide

- Investment Guide To Iran, Atieh Bahar Consulting, February 2014, archived from the original on 17 March 2014

General statistics

- Memorandum of the foreign trade regime of Iran (PDF), Ministry of Commerce (Iran), November 2009, archived from the original (PDF) on 10 March 2013
