= Iran–United States copyright relations =

According to Circular 38a of the U.S. Copyright Office, Iran has no official copyright relations whatsoever with the United States.

Published works originating in Iran thus are not copyrighted in the United States, regardless of the local copyright laws of these countries. See 17 U.S.C. § 104(b)(2), quoted in the Circular. Unpublished works, however, are copyrighted regardless of their origin or of the nationality of the works' authors, as long as they remain unpublished. See 17 U.S.C. § 104(a).

== Freely distributed software ==
Examples of popular items reproduced in Iran. The Microsoft Windows CD has a price tag equivalent to about $US2.50.

Microsoft products can be copied and distributed freely in Iran, whether by government offices, universities, or personal users. There are shopping centers in Tehran and other cities in Iran that specialize in the distribution of often highly specialized software.

Recently, there has been a surge in Iranian "Warez" and "Crackz" websites, as the Iranian laws do not forbid hosting them in Iran. Hence, unlike most other countries where hosting these websites might potentially lead to prosecution, it is very efficient to do so in Iran.

== Use of unlicensed content in the media ==
Offset prints of popular college textbooks in Iran. The Springer textbook on Quantum Mechanics seen here is printed by "Jahad Daneshgahi", a government-affiliated organization.

It is not uncommon nowadays for IRIB, Iran's state run television broadcasting organization, to air edited and censored versions of Hollywood blockbusters dubbed into Persian. Some theaters however, such as Cinema Farhang in Tehran, screen the movies in the original language. None are screened with permission, as there are no relations between Iran and any US companies.

The unlicensed DVD of a Hollywood film often hits stores across Iran sooner than the movie is released in theaters in the US. Most newly released movies are in-theater-handycam versions. Nevertheless, there is no shortage of unlicensed DVD-quality reproductions.

Academia relies almost entirely on translations of textbooks without licensing by foreign publishers. If in English, the books are offset prints that enable students to purchase textbooks at subsidized prices. While most of the original contents are mainatained, the difference between the originals and unauthorized copies of textbooks is the replacement of images in order to comply with Iranian culture instead of western cultures. Furthermore, these textbooks are often exported for sale at cheaper prices in other countries, which do maintain copyright relations with the United States.

== See also ==
- Intellectual property in Iran
- Economy of Iran
- List of countries' copyright lengths
- Iran-United States relations
- Smuggling in Iran
