= Persian Gulf Complex =

Coordinates: 29°45′21″N 52°25′53″E

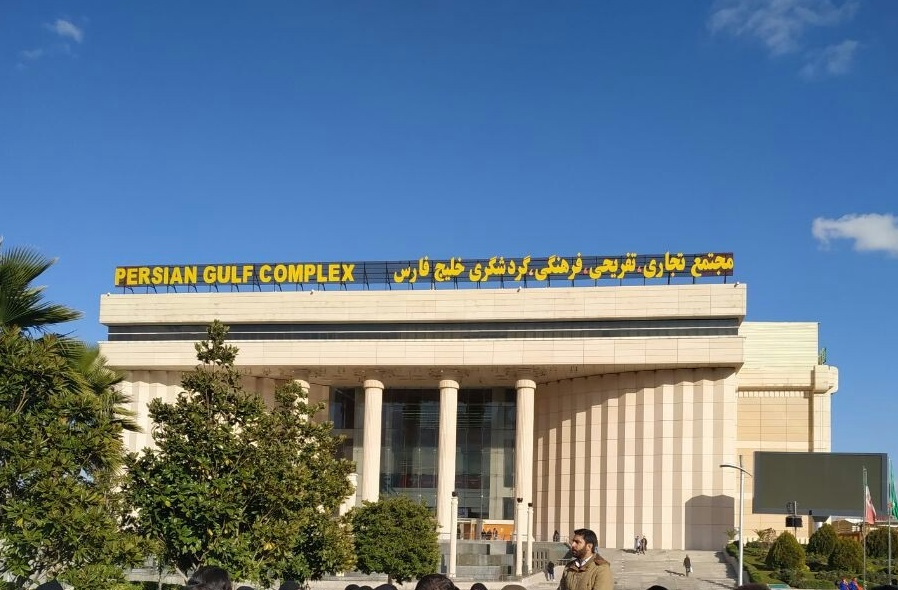
- Location: Sadra, Shiraz, Iran
- Opened: September 2011
- Developer: Royal Star International
- Owner: Hossain Hossaini
- Num. of stores: 2,500
- Floor area: 500,000 square metres (5,400,000 sq ft)
- Website: persiangulfmall.com/en/home/

Persian Gulf Complex is the 18th largest shopping mall in the world, located in Shiraz, Iran. It is the second biggest mall in terms of the number of shops after Iran Mall in the world.

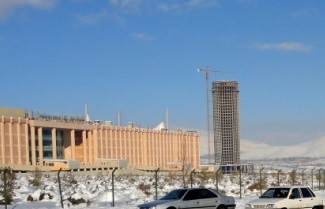
The Fars Hotel (under construction), a part of the complex

== Description ==
The facility has space for 2,500 stores covering 500,000 square metres (5,400,000 sq ft).

The complex includes the Fars Tower International, a 262-room hotel, an indoor and outdoor swimming pool, tennis court, convention centre and a helipad. In addition, there are two amusement parks at the mall, an outdoor amusement park called Iran Land, covering 37,000 square metres (400,000 sq ft), and an indoor amusement park covering 28,000 square metres (300,000 sq ft) with video games, a bowling alley and a 3-story billiard hall. The mall also has six 240-seat cinema. A 14,000-square-metre (150,000 sq ft) Carrefour Hypermarket is also located within the mall. The complex has four floors of parking space that can accommodate a total of 5,500 vehicles.

== Management ==
The Persian Gulf Complex is managed by Royal Star International (Setareh Trading Complex).
