= Ministry of Commerce (Iran) =

Government ministry of Iran, 2000–2011

- وزارت بازرگانی

Agency overview
- Formed: January 1, 2000
- Preceding agency: Ministry of Cooperatives
- Dissolved: August 3, 2011
- Superseding agency: Ministry of Industries and Business
- Jurisdiction: Islamic Republic of Iran
- Headquarters: Tehran

The Ministry of Commerce of Iran was the main organ of the Government in charge of the regulation and implementation of policies applicable to domestic and foreign trade. This includes:

- implementing commercial strategies and regulations,
- promoting exports,
- development programs,
- import and export regulations,
- pricing of domestic commodities,
- domestic and international trade fairs and exhibitions.

The Ministry of Commerce was also in charge of managing the process of accession to the WTO.

== Trade Promotion Organization ==
The Trade Promotion Organization is affiliated to the Ministry of Commerce. It is in charge of promoting non-oil exports in Iran. It has close ties to the Institute of Standards and Industrial Research of Iran. Iran will increase its commercial attachés abroad from 11 to 30 in 2014.

== Export Guarantee Fund of Iran ==
Affiliated to the Ministry of Commerce, the Export Guarantee Fund of Iran has been established in order to expand and promote exports, to protect exporters against non-commercial risks, which are normally not covered by the insurance companies, and to guarantee credits used for export of such goods and services.

== The Organization for the Protection of Consumers and Producers ==
The Organization for the Protection of Consumers and Producers (OPCP) is affiliated to the Ministry of Commerce. The main functions of OPCP are:

- protecting and promoting domestic production;
- protecting consumers against unusual price fluctuations;
- monitoring, adjusting and controlling the price of products and services;

== The Government Trading Company (GTC) ==
The GTC is affiliated to the Ministry of Commerce. The main objective of its establishment is to ensure food security in the country through procuring the basic commodities such as wheat, rice, raw sugar, raw oil, milk in powder, fertilizer, required by the public such as essential foodstuffs from domestic and foreign sources. Such commodities are distributed among consumers at subsidized prices. The activities of the GTC regarding the procurement of essential commodities are regulated by the statute "the Government Procurement Concerning the Supply of Basic Products and Foodstuffs Essential to the Public from Foreign Sources".

== See also ==
- Economy of Iran
- Cabinet of Iran
- Government of Iran
- Iran and WTO
