= Intellectual property in Iran =

Iran is a member of the WIPO since 2001 and has acceded to several WIPO intellectual property treaties. Iran joined the Convention for the Protection of Industrial Property (Paris Convention) in 1959. In December 2003 Iran became a party to the Madrid Agreement and the Madrid Protocol for the International Registration of Marks. In 2005 Iran joined the Lisbon Agreement for the Protection of Appellations of Origin and their International Registration, which ensures the protection of geographical names associated with products. As at February 2008 Iran had yet to accede to The Hague Agreement for the Protection of Industrial Designs.

== Agencies responsible for IP policy in Iran ==
- The Department of Authors, Composers and Artists at the Ministry of Culture and Islamic Guidance is the main responsible body for copyright matters,
- The Industrial Property Office at the Organization for Registration of Deeds and Estates of the Judiciary of Iran is in charge of industrial property affairs. It includes drafting copyright regulations that comply with international standards and international brand registration services.
- The Iranian Research Organization for Science and Technology deals with the operationalization of national technology development plans and policies, issuance of scientific certificates and examination of feasibility or industrial applicability of proposed projects and inventions.

== Law for the Protection of Authors, Composers and Artists Rights, 1970 ==
Iran has a legal code to protect the proprietary and intellectual rights of works produced inside Iran called "Law for the Protection of Authors, Composers and Artists Rights", dated January 12, 1970, passed by Pahlavi Iran's National Consultative Assembly, supplemented with the “Law for the protection of Rights of the Authors of Computer Programs” passed on 2000 (Iranian year 1379).

On 22 August 2010, Iran's Islamic Consultative Assembly passed a reformation of article 12 of Law for the Protection of Authors, Composers and Artists Rights and increased the copyright length based on author's death to 50 years after death of author; this law only applies to works that were still in protection when the law passed on 22 August 2010.

However these laws do not cover works from outside Iran as it is not a signatory to the Berne Convention for the Protection of Literary and Artistic Works or the WIPO Copyright Treaty, or a member of the World Trade Organization (WTO). In 2012 Iran announced plans to join international conventions on the protection of literary, artistic, scientific works, including Berne Convention and Rome Convention.

== Law of Registration of Marks and Patents, 1931 ==
The Iranian Law of Registration of Marks and Patents of 1931 stipulates that a trademark is any type of logo, design, picture, number, letter, word, seal, wrapper, etc. that is adopted to identify and distinguish goods and services. The law provides for registration of various types of marks chosen to identify industrial, commercial or agricultural products and goods. It also provides for registration of service marks. The essential requirement is that the mark presented for registration should be distinctive.

Article 30 of the law provides that any inventor or discoverer who holds an unexpired patent certificate outside Iran may apply for a patent in Iran valid for the remaining duration of the original one. But if a person or firm has used the invention or discovery in Iran—wholly or partially—prior to the foreigner’s application or has made preparations to exploit the same, the foreign patentee will not have the right to stop the operation of said person or firm.

== Law of Registration of Patents, Industrial Designs and Trademarks, 2008 ==
The Law of Registration of Patents, Industrial Designs and Trademarks was first passed by the Iranian parliament on 23 January 2008 for a probationary period of five years, effective from May 5, 2008.

The Majlis (Parliament) also ratified a bill in May 2001 to recognize and enforce international arbitration awards, a decision designed to grant companies greater protection over their property. By acceding to the Convention on the Recognition and Enforcement of Foreign Arbitral Awards, commonly known as the New York Convention, Iran has agreed to enforce arbitration awards made in other countries. Awards issued in Iran will also be enforceable in other member countries.

According to Nourlaw, the new law, unlike its predecessor gives priority to patents and industrial designs over trademarks and is substantially more scrupulous in the protection of these instruments, as it is of intellectual property rights. According to the State Registration Organization of Deeds and Properties, a total of 9,570 national inventions was registered in Iran during 2008. Compared with the previous year, there was a 38-percent increase in the number of inventions registered by the organization.

Iran is neither a party to an international agreement nor has a distinct law concerning the layout designs of integrated circuits. However, as these can be regarded as an invention or an original technical work, they may be considered subject to, and thus protected by, Article 26 of the Trademarks and Patents Registration Act (1931) concerning patents or Article 2.11 of the Act on the Protection of the Rights of Authors, Composers and Artists (1970) as to the original technical works (See above).

=== Patents ===
Novelty: No public knowledge in Iran or abroad sufficient to put into practice. The first person to apply for the registration of an invention in accordance with the law is considered the inventor of the patent, unless proven otherwise.

Types and duration: Patents are registered for 5, 10, 15 or 20 years, at the option of the applicant.

Unpatentable: Pharmaceutical formula and compounds are not patentable, but a patent application can be filed for processes related to the manufacture of pharmaceuticals. In addition, any invention or improvement on an invention disturbing public order or considered to be contrary to morality or public health cannot be patented.

Working: A patent will be vulnerable to cancellation if it is not worked during the five-year period following its date of granting.

Registration: In October 2007 Iran's parliament approved becoming signatory to the Patent Cooperation Treaty (PCT) which enables patent holders in one country to register their patents in PCT member countries simply by filing a single application with the related national registration authority.

=== Copyrights ===
Registrable: Books, pamphlets, plays and all other literary, scientific and artistic writings, irrespective of the way they are written, recorded or broadcast; audiovisual works for stage or screen performances or for broadcasting by radio and television; paintings, pictures, drawings, designs, decorative writings, geographical maps or any decorative and imaginative work produced in any simple or complex manner; sculptures of all types; architectural works, designs, sketches and buildings; photographic works produced by any original methods; original articles of applied handicraft and industrial art, carpet and rug designs; original works based on folklore and national heritage of culture and arts.

=== Trademarks ===
Types and duration: A trademark may be registered for ten years, renewable indefinitely for additional ten-year periods.

Legal effect: Registration gives an owner the exclusive right to use a trademark on the goods for which the trademark is registered. The owner may prevent other parties from using the trademark on competing products.

Not registrable: The official flag of Iran; any flag that the government has prohibited to be used as a trademark; badges, medals and insignia of the Iranian government; marks of official institutions such as the Iranian Red Crescent or the International Red Cross; words and/or phrases creating an impression of official connection with Iranian authorities; marks contrary to public order and public morals (the standard for this is tougher in Iran than in most other countries); and marks that so closely resemble an already registered mark that it would cause confusion or deceive consumers.

Working: If a trademark has not been used in Iran or abroad within three years from the registration date and if the owner or his legal representative fails to furnish a valid reason, any interested party may apply to the court and request cancellation of trademark.

Registration: To register a trademark, an applicant (Iranian or foreign) should refer in person or through an attorney to the Registration Office for Industrial Property, in Tehran, and file a request for obtaining a certificate of trademark registration. Applications are published in the official gazette so that interested parties may inspect and, if needed, contest them. The registrar examines applications for format, content and consistency in compliance with the relevant rules of registration. If the registrar rejects an application, the applicant may appeal in court.

== Plant Variety Protection Act, 2003 ==
In order to protect plant varieties, a distinct legislation entitled was adopted in 2003.

== Protection of Geographical Indications Act, 2004 ==
The use of a Geographical Indications may act as a certification that the product possesses certain qualities, or enjoys a certain reputation, due to its geographical origin.

== Licensing and franchising ==
There are numerous associations that assist in matching licensers and franchisers with local partners. The most important of these is the Iran Chamber of Commerce Industries and Mines. Another important point of reference is the Internet-based Iran Trade Point Network, which provides information on locating local partners.

Failure to observe the Copyright Law has prevented overseas companies from investing in Iran’s software industry.

== E-commerce ==
The Iranian Parliament adopted the Electronic Commerce Law in 2004. Articles 62–66 of this law specify that Iran’s existing intellectual-property laws apply to all electronic transactions. Articles 62 and 63 deal with the protection of authors’ rights; Articles 64 and 65 ensure the protection of trade secrets; and Article 66 protects trademarks and domain names.

== International conventions ==
=== Protection of Cultural Property ===
Iran ratified the Protocol to the Convention for the Protection of Cultural Property in the Event of Armed Conflict (The Hague, 14 May 1954.) in 1959 and the Convention on the Means of Prohibiting and Preventing the Illicit Import, Export and Transfer of Ownership of Cultural Property (Paris, 14 November 1970.) in 1975, and agreed to the Convention concerning the Protection of the World Cultural and Natural Heritage (Paris, 16 November 1972) and to the Second Protocol to the Hague Convention of 1954 for the Protection of Cultural Property in the Event of Armed Conflict. (The Hague, 26 March 1999) in 2005.

=== Convention for the Protection of Industrial Property (a.k.a. the Paris Convention), 1959 ===
Iran is a signatory to the International Convention for Protection of Industrial Property (also known as the Paris Convention).

=== World Intellectual Property Organization (WIPO), 2002 ===
Iran is a member of the WIPO since 2002 and has acceded to several WIPO intellectual property treaties. However, Iran is not a signatory to the WIPO Copyright Treaty.

As per WIPO's report titled "World Intellectual Property Indicators 2013", Iran ranked 90th for patents generated by Iranian nationals all over the world, 100th in industrial design and 82nd in trademarks, positioning Iran below Jordan and Venezuela in this regard but above Yemen and Jamaica.

=== Madrid Agreement Concerning the International Registration of Marks, 2003 ===
The Council of Ministers passed Decree H24305T/6921 in December 2003, ratifying Iran’s accession to the Madrid Agreement Concerning the International Registration of Marks and its protocol.

=== Lisbon Agreement for the Protection of Appellations of Origin and their International Registration, 2005 ===
In 2005 Iran joined the Lisbon Agreement for the Protection of Appellations of Origin and their International Registration, which ensures the protection of geographical names associated with products. The Lisbon Agreement went into force in March 2006. As a direct consequence, Iran’s Customs Administration has banned the import of goods that are produced overseas but bear Iranian brand names.

== WTO copyright laws ==
Iran's government has not agreed to be bound by WTO copyright laws, endorsing the free distribution of unlicensed software in massive quantities. Linux, freely reproducible even in countries with strong Intellectual Property (IP) laws, is also growing in popularity within Iran, however.

Iran may change this status if and when it becomes a full member of WTO, as WTO members are encouraged to abide by WTO copyright regulations. However, the United States has previously vetoed Iran's ascension to the WTO 22 times, and as of 2007 actively refuses to support Iran's full membership in the WTO. Thus, as a matter of reciprocity, Iran has determined that its interests are not served by observing WTO copyright treaties, and has thus exercised its sovereign right not to alter its laws, thereby making certain foreign copyrights unenforced by Iranian authorities, in theory, or in practice.

Iranian pharmaceutical manufacturers are disadvantaged by the government's poor intellectual property protection regime. Developing a molecule for combination therapies may qualify for patent protection in other countries. However, while weak patent law adherence continues in Iran, it is expected this will create significant barriers for Iranian companies prospecting trade on the global market.

== See also ==
- Iran and copyright issues
- Science in Iran
- Economy of Iran
- List of countries' copyright length
- International rankings of Iran
- List of major economic laws in Iran
- Media of Iran
