= Varzaqan =

City in East Azerbaijan province, Iran

Varzaqan ورزقان
- City
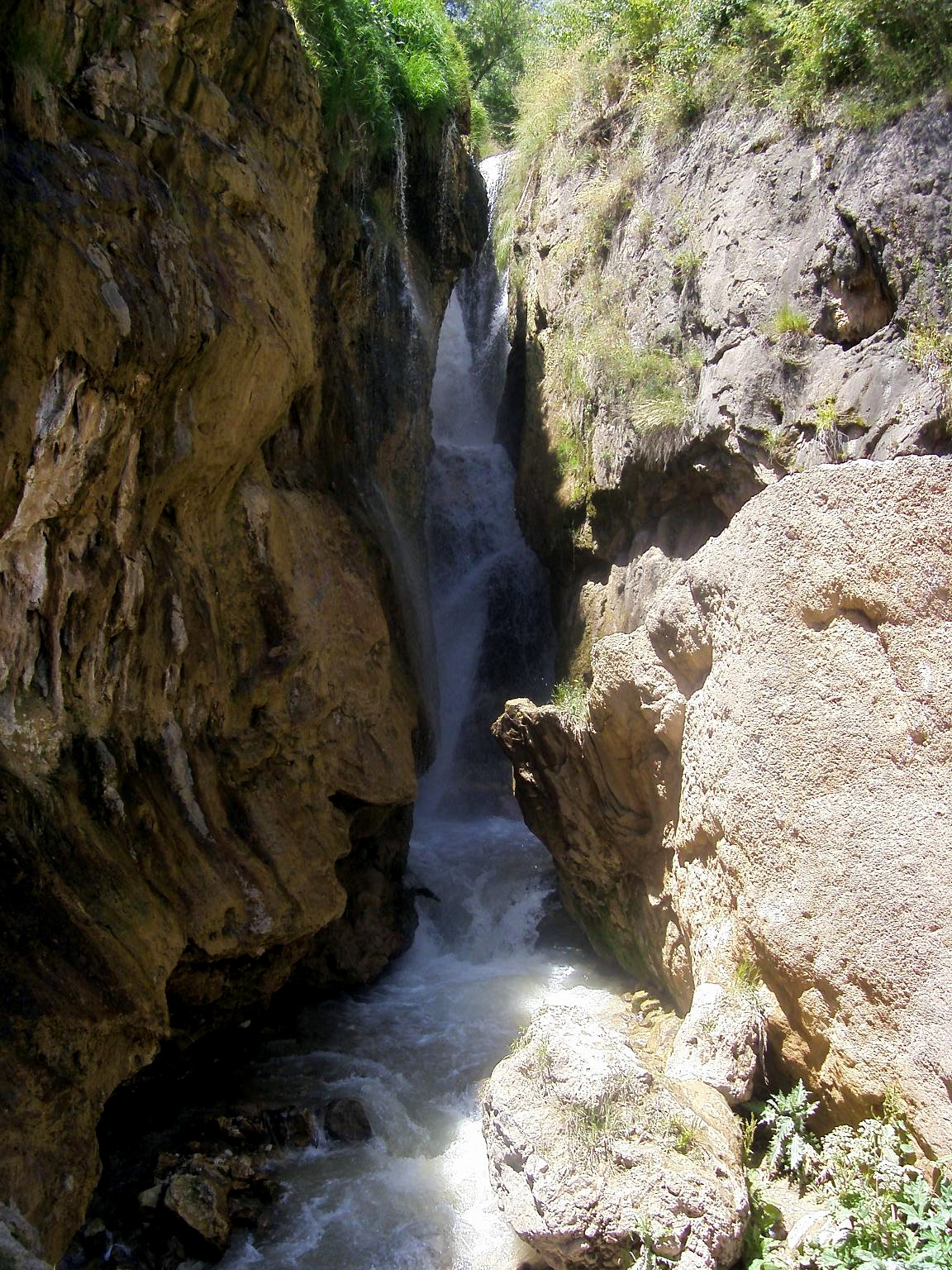
- Gol Akhur waterfall
- Interactive map of Varzaqan
- Location within Iran
- Coordinates: 38°30′34″N 46°39′00″E
- Country: Iran
- Province: East Azerbaijan
- County: Varzaqan
- District: Central
- Established as a city: 1993

Population (2016)
  - Total: 5,348
- Time zone: UTC+3:30 (IRST)
- Website: www.varzeqan.com

Varzaqan (Persian: ورزقان) (Note: Also romanized as Varzeqān; also known as Warzagan; formerly Karzigan (كَرزيگَن), also romanized as Kārzigān and Karzygan) is a city in the Central District of Varzaqan County, (Note: Formerly Arsbaran County) East Azerbaijan province, Iran, serving as capital of both the county and the district. It is also the administrative center for Ozomdel-e Jonubi Rural District. The village of Varzaqan was converted to a city in 1993.

== History ==
=== 2024 helicopter crash ===
On 19 May 2024, a helicopter crash occurred about 25 km (16 mi) north of the city, killing Iranian President Ebrahim Raisi, Foreign Minister Hossein Amir-Abdollahian, and others.

== Demographics ==
=== Population ===
At the time of the 2006 National Census, the city's population was 3,549 in 930 households. The following census in 2011 counted 5,385 people in 1,392 households. The 2016 census measured the population of the city as 5,348 people in 1,401 households.

== Geography ==
=== Earthquakes ===
The area is subject to earthquakes, and in 2012, a number of people were killed when an earthquake doublet (magnitude 6.4 and 6.3) struck on the afternoon of 11 August.

== Economy ==
=== Agriculture ===
Farming and gardening is the predominant occupation in the rural areas of Varzaqan. The agricultural products from the area include apple, pear, cherry, walnut and apricot fruit. Recently spruce trees have been planted as the start of a forestry industry. Cold water fish farming has been started more recently.

=== Mining ===
The city is notable for the Sungun copper mine, 21.8 km (13.5 mi) from the city centre, which is estimated to have 3 percent of the known copper reserves in the world.

Varzaqan is a mining centre for base metal mining, as well as gold. The Sungun copper mine is now the largest copper mine in northwestern Iran. The deposit itself is one of the largest copper deposits in the world. There are nearby gold mines at Sharafabad, Hyzjan, Tshkhsrv, Astrgan, Andaryan and Myvhrvd.

== Historical landmarks ==
The cuneiform inscription in the village of Saqandel is the most famous historical monument in the region.
