= Golgohar Mining and Industrial Company =

Mining company of Iran

Golgohar Mining and Industrials Company
- Company type: Public company
- Traded as: TSE: GOLG1
- ISIN: IRO1GOLG0001
- Industry: Mining, Steel industry
- Founded: 1991
- Founder: National Iran Steel Company
- Headquarters: Sirjan, Tehran, Iran
- Products: Iron ore Semi-finished casting products Direct reduced iron Pellet; Iron ore concentrate
- Owner: Omid Investment Group (affiliated to Bank Sepah)
- Website: www.geg.ir

Golgohar Mining and Industrials Company (Persian: شرکت معدنی و صنعتی گل‌گهر, romanized: Sherkat-e San'ati va Ma'dani-ye golgohar), is an Iranian Mining company in Sirjan, Kerman, which was established in 1991.

== History ==
Golgohar Mining and Industrial Company was registered in 1991 under number 409 at the Sirjan Registration Office with an initial capital of 100 billion Iranian rials. In 1993, the company obtained its operating license. Mining operations at zone No. 1 of Gol Gohar mine began in 1994. In 2003, based on a decision made at the ordinary general assembly, the company transitioned from a private joint-stock company to a public joint-stock company. The following year, in 2004, its shares were listed on the Tehran Stock Exchange as "GOLG1".

== Products ==
The company activities include two stages. The first stage is iron ore extraction from Gol Gohar mine. The second stage includes the processing of primary iron ore in its various factories into secondary products such as pellet, direct reduced iron, Iron ore concentrate, and semi-finished casting products.

== Sanctions ==
In 2020, the United States Treasury Department sanctioned Golgohar Mining and Industrials Company in order to target Iran metal industries.

== See also ==
- Mining in Iran
- Gol Gohar Sirjan F.C.
