= IDRO Group =

Rolling stock manufacturer

- Company type: Government-owned corporation
- Industry: Conglomerate
- Founded: 1967; 59 years ago
- Founder: Mohammad Reza Pahlavi
- Headquarters: Tehran, Iran
- Area served: Worldwide
- Key people: Mohammad Atabak (Minister of Industry, Mine and Trade); Farshad Moghimi (Chairman of the board of directors)
- Products: Automobiles, Vehicles, Engines, Oil, Gas, Energy, Machinery, Agriculture, Mines, Metals, Research, Training, Aviation, Banking, Trade, Health care, Railway, Management, Technology, Investment
- Revenue: ▲US$ 17 billion (2009)
- Net income: ▲US$ 1.486 billion (2009)
- Total assets: ▲US$ 45.766 billion (2009)
- Website: www.idro.org

The Industrial Development & Renovation Organization of Iran (IDRO) known as IDRO Group was established in 1967 in Iran. IDRO Group is one of the largest companies in Iran. It is also one of the largest conglomerates in Asia. IDRO's objective is to develop Iran's industry sector and to accelerate the industrialization process of the country and to export Iranian products worldwide. Today, IDRO owns 117 subsidiaries and affiliated companies both domestically as well as internationally.

== Businesses ==
In the course of its 40 years of activity, IDRO has gradually become a major shareholder of some key industries in Iran. In recent years and in accordance with the country's privatization policy, IDRO has made great efforts to privatize its affiliated companies. While carrying on its privatization policies and lessening its role as a holding company, IDRO intends to concentrate on its prime missions and to turn into an industrial development agency. IDRO has focused its activities on the following areas in order to materialize such strategy and to expedite the industrial development of Iran:

- Promotion of local and foreign investments with minority holdings owned by IDRO (less than 50% of the shares) with particular emphasis on new, hi-tech and export-oriented industries.
- Restructuring the existing industries through participation of reputable foreign companies in order to transfer new technologies and to enhance the non-oil exports of Iran.
- Development of general contracting activities with the participation of the Iranian private sector and credible foreign companies.
- Rendering consultancy and support services to foreign investors.
- Privatization of the existing subsidiaries.
- Industrial Investment
- Management Development
- Automotive Industry
- Industrial Equipment Machinery
- Marine Industry
- Railway Industry
- Hi-Tech Industries Development
- General Contracting
- Health care
- Banking

== Privatization ==
IDRO had privatized 140 of its companies worth about 2,000 billion rials ($200 million) in the past. The organization will offer shares of 150 industrial units to private investors by March 2010. In 2009, 290 companies were under the control of the IDRO.

=== Subsidiaries ===
This is a list of IDRO's main subsidiaries (as of 2008):

Company	Activity	Sector
Iran Khodro	Designing & production of passenger cars, and after sale services	Cars And Vehicles
Govah Co.	Supplier of spare parts for Mercedes Benz commercial vehicles, after sale services for Iran Khodro Diesel products, minibuses, buses and trucks	Cars And Vehicles
Iran Auto Parts Mfg. Co. (Ipaco)	Production of rings, bumpers, automotive parts & control cables	Cars And Vehicles
Supplying Automotive Parts Co. (SAPCO)	Design, engineering & supplying automotive parts	Cars And Vehicles
Iran Khodro Diesel Co.	Manufacturing of commercial vehicles (Diesel and CNG engines)	Cars And Vehicles
Khawar Parts Production Co. (K.P.P.Co)	Designing, manufacturing, and assembly of light and commercial vehicles	Cars And Vehicles
Mehvarsazan Co.	Production of axles for light- & semi-heavy vehicles	Cars And Vehicles
Mehrcam Pars Co.	Manufacturing interior & exterior trim: plastic parts & A/C units for passenger cars	Cars And Vehicles
Technology In Automotive Industry Advance Mfg. Co. (T.A.M)	Design & manufacture: special machine tools & equipment for automobile production	Cars And Vehicles
Top Service Co.	Supplying spare parts & after sale services: Mercedes-Benz passenger cars and Mb140 vans	Cars And Vehicles
Vehicle Axle Mfg.Co. (V.A.M)	Production of axles & differentials for diesel vehicles	Cars And Vehicles
Iran Khodro Spare Parts And After Sales Services Co. (ISACO)	Supplying parts and after sales services for Iran Khodro Products	Cars And Vehicles
Pars Khodro Co.	Automobile manufacturing	Cars And Vehicles
Desco	Design, engineering & supplying of automotive parts	Cars And Vehicles
Iran Heavy Diesel Engine Mfg.Co (Desa)	Manufacturing of heavy diesel engines	Cars And Vehicles
Sane Co.	Manufacturing of diesel engines & Pride engine parts	Cars And Vehicles
Rena Technical Services Co.	After sale services for Saipa Diesel	Cars And Vehicles
Spare Parts Production & Developing Services Of Pars Khodro Co.	After sale services for Pars Khodro vehicles	Cars And Vehicles
SAIPA	Vehicle manufacturing	Cars And Vehicles
Indamin-Saipa Mfg.Co	Manufacturing of shock absorbers	Cars And Vehicles
Saipa Heavy Dies (Iran Heavy Dies) Mfg. Co.	Design & manufacturing of heavy dies for automobile bodies and high-speed Cnc machine yools	Cars And Vehicles
Saipa Diesel Co.	Manufacturing, design, and research (parts, painting, assembling) for trucks and minibus	Cars And Vehicles
Kaveh Khodro Saipa Co.	Design and manufacturing of various "OEM" spare parts and truck components	Cars And Vehicles
Mega Motor Co.	Manufacturing of automotive power train and related components	Cars And Vehicles
Plasco Kar Saipa Co.	Designing & manufacturing of automotive plastic parts	Cars And Vehicles
Saipa Yadak Trading Co.	Spare parts and after sales services	Cars And Vehicles
Sazeh Gostar Saipa Co.	Design & production of auto parts and accessories	Cars And Vehicles
Saipa Azin Co.	Manufacturing of vehicle seats, door panels, and trims	Cars And Vehicles
Iran Radiator Co.	Manufacturing of automotive radiators and heat exchangers for generators, power plants, etc.	Cars And Vehicles
Charkheshgar Co.	Manufacturer of commercial and automobile transmissions and steering assemblies	Cars And Vehicles
Saipa Piston Co.	Manufacturing of 2- & 4-stroke pistons & piston pins	Cars And Vehicles
Zamyad Co.	Production of Iveco trucks & minibuses	Cars And Vehicles
Press Iran Co.	Design and manufacture of presses and auxiliary pressline equipment	Cars And Vehicles
Abzaran Co.	Production of mechanical tools and forged parts	Cars And Vehicles
Saipa Malleable Co.	Automotive safety and high-technology parts of cast iron	Cars And Vehicles
Saipa Engineering Manufacturing	Equipment & tool design & manufacturing of dies, punches, control gauges & special tools	Cars And Vehicles
I.K.D Engineering & Procurement Co (I.K.D. Ep. Co.)	Supply and engineering of parts and equipment for Iran Khodro Diesel	Cars And Vehicles
IDEM (Iranian Diesel Engine Mgf.Co.)	Production of Mercedes-Benz diesel engines and related parts	Cars And Vehicles
Mashhad Wheel Mfg. Co. (M. W. M)	Automobile wheel manufacture	Cars And Vehicles
IHDM - Iran Heavy Dies Manufacturing Co.	Manufacture of heavy dies for the automobile industry	Cars And Vehicles
Industrial Projects Management Of Iran (IPMI)	EPC turn-key petroleum, petrochemical and gas projects	Oil, Gas And Energy
Machine Sazi Arak Co.	Design, manufacturing, installation, and servicing of oil & gas equipment, hydro-mechanical dam equipment, steel bridges and structures	Oil, Gas And Energy
Machine Sazi Pars Co.	Manufacturing of steel structures, oil storage tanks	Oil, Gas And Energy
Machine Sazi Lorestan Co.	Design and fabrication of energy industry steel structures, tanks and pressure vessels	Oil, Gas And Energy
Nasb Gostar (Jonid) Co.	Engineering, designing & erection of steam boilers	Oil, Gas And Energy
Neyreperse Co.	Design, manufacturing & installation of energy industry equipment and projects, road & bridge construction	Oil, Gas And Energy
Petroleum Equipment Industries Co.	Production of machinery & equipment for oil & gas industries	Oil, Gas And Energy
Pars International Development Eng. Co. (PIDECO)	Consultancy services: designing, & engineering	Oil, Gas And Energy
Potleh Co.	Design & manufacturing of powerplant equipment, oil refinery equipment, cement kiln, pressure vessels, storage tanks and steel structures	Oil, Gas And Energy
Technicon Co.	General contracting and Epc execution of industrial projects, engineering and design services for industries and plants	Oil, Gas And Energy
Techno-Tar Engineering Co.	Manufacturing and design of fuel dispensers, mobile stations and CNG dispensers	Oil, Gas And Energy
Paysaz Co.	Manufacturing of pressure vessels, towers, storage tanks, refinery equipment	Oil, Gas And Energy
Tehran Sufa	Production of industrial valves	Oil, Gas And Energy
Toos Payvand Co.	Manufacture of butt welding fittings & supplier of industrial fittings, flanges and pipes	Oil, Gas And Energy
Gostaresh Shirsazi Co.	Production of valves for oil & gas industries	Oil, Gas And Energy
Petrochemical Down Stream Industries Co.( PDSID)	Research and consulting for petrochemical down-stream industries	Oil, Gas And Energy
Nasb Niroo Co.	Erection & commissioning of power plants, civil construction projects: sub-stations & high-transmission lines	Oil, Gas And Energy
Engineering, Designing Trading Co. ( E.D.Co. )	Production of hand saw machine and tools machine spurs	Oil, Gas And Energy
HEPCO	Manufacturing and assembly of earth-moving, road construction, and material handling equipment	Oil, Gas And Energy
Heavy Duty Pump And Water Turbine Mfg Co.	Heavy-duty pump and water turbine manufacture for oil and gas industry	Oil, Gas And Energy
Damafin Thermal Technology Co.	Manufacture of air coolers and finned tubes	Oil, Gas And Energy
Nasbe Sanaye Azarabe		Oil, Gas And Energy
Iran Textile Industries Co.	Manufacturing of ring spinning machines	Machinery And Equipment
Machine Sazi Tabriz Group	Manufacturing universal and Cnc machine tools, casting, forging parts, turnout	Machinery And Equipment
Hepco Engineering & Parts Co.	Design & manufacturing of parts for road construction machines	Machinery And Equipment
Wagon Pars	Production, manufacture & purchase of railway vehicles	Machinery And Equipment
Wagon Parts Supplying Co. (Tav)	Design, manufacturing & Supplying spare parts for rolling stock	Machinery And Equipment
Iran Locomotive Manufacturing Co.	Refurbishment, repair & manufacture of locomotives	Machinery And Equipment
Jemco	Production of electric motors	Machinery And Equipment
Railway Transportation Industries (RTI)	Managing and linking of subcontractors and suppliers in railway transportation industries	Machinery And Equipment
Ferdows Textile Co.	Implementing of spinning and weaving factory	Machinery And Equipment
Industrial nuts, bolts, engineering, trading	Production of bolts, stud bolts, nuts and waders	Machinery And Equipment
Zeraa T Choob Hamoon Co.	Growing eucalyptus seedling to be planted around Jiroft region	Machinery And Equipment
Pars Pirex Shargh	Producing of borosilicate glass	Machinery And Equipment
Alam Ara Cpt Co.	Production of TV color picture tubes and displays (Before Exploitation)	Machinery And Equipment
Zohreh Tile Co.	Single firing tile production	Machinery And Equipment
Elegant Semnan Joint Venture Investments	Textile	Machinery And Equipment
Luleh Gostar Esfarayen Company (LGECO)	Manufacturing of pipes	Machinery And Equipment
Jiroft Cellulose Industries Co.	Producer of conventional viscose	Agricultural Machinery
Iran Combine Manufacturing Company	Producer and distributor of agricultural and harvesting machines	Agricultural Machinery
Iran Tractor Manufacturing Company	Design, manufacturing and sales of tractors, trailers, agricultural equipment, and light trucks	Agricultural Machinery
Iran Tractor Forging Co.	Manufacturing of automotive forging parts	Agricultural Machinery
Iran Tractor Foundry Co. (Itfco)	Production of cast iron, design and manufacturing of foundry tooling patterns for tractors, engines & vehicles	Agricultural Machinery
Iran Tractor Industrial Machinery Co.	Design And Manufacturing Of Industrial And Agricultural Machinery	Agricultural Machinery
Iran Tractor Industrial Services Co.	Designing, Manufacturing, Erection & Commissioning Of Electrical & Mechanical Equipment	Agricultural Machinery
Iran Tractor Motorsazan Co.	Manufacturing Of Diesel And Gas Engines For Tractors, Compressors	Agricultural Machinery
Iran Tractor Commercial Co.	Export, Import & After-Sale Services Of Agri-Industrial Machinery & Implements	Agricultural Machinery
Taka Co.	Production Of Agricultural Equipment	Agricultural Machinery
Mines & Metals Esfarayen Industrial Complex (E.I.Co)	Production Of Forged Steel Sections	Mines And Metals
Iran Foundry Materials Supplying And Distribution Co.	Production & Distribution Of Foundry Materials	Mines And Metals
Pars Kani, Mineral Industries Research And Development Co.	Oil & Gas Upstream Activities, A "Gc" In Mineral Industries.	Mines And Metals
Gostaresh Steel Industries Co.	Implementation Of Steel Plants & Related Mines Industries	Mines And Metals
Tabriz Machine Sazi Foundry Company (TMFCO)		Mines And Metals
Arvandan Shipbuilding Co.	Design, Construction, Repair and Renovation Of Steel Vessels And Offshore Structures	Marine And Offshore Industries
Iran Shipbuilding & Offshore Industries Complex (ISOICO)	Shipbuilding And Ship Repairs, Construction And & Installation Of Offshore Structures	Marine And Offshore Industries
Iran Marine Industrial Co. (Sadra Co.)	Shipbuilding & Ship Repair, Oil & Gas Construction, Offshore Installation, Infrastructural & Marine Projects, Epcic Projects	Marine And Offshore Industries
Offshore Industries Company (SAFF)	Engineering, Procurement Construction, Installation And Commissioning Of Offshore Structures, Marine Pipe Laying And Other Related	Marine And Offshore Industries
Sadra Omid Chabahar (Originally Named "Chabahar Ship Scrapping And Vessel Parts Manufacturing Co.")	Ship Building, Ship Repair, Ship Breaking	Marine And Offshore Industries
Industrial Management Institute	Providing Management Education	Training, Research And Industrial Services
Institute for Productivity & Human Resource Development	Consulting & Training Services	Training, Research And Industrial Services
Advanced Manufacturing Research Center (Amrc)	Industrial Automation, Robotics, Vision Systems, Consulting In High-Tech Activities & Training	Training, Research And Industrial Services
Automotive Industries Research And Innovation Center (AIRIC)	Design And Engineering Services And Prototype Manufacturing For Vehicles	Training, Research And Industrial Services
IDRO Trading Co.	Export, Import, Commercial Services, Financing	Training, Research And Industrial Services
Idro International Trading Co.	Import & Export And Other Commercial Activities	Training, Research And Industrial Services
Iran Automotive Industries Consulting Engineers Co.	Automotive Industries Consultants	Training, Research And Industrial Services
Information Technology Development Center (Magfa)	Research & Consulting And Development Of (IT) Industry	Training, Research And Industrial Services
Iran Industrial Consultants (IIC)	Engineering And Industrial Consultancy Services In Fields Of Machineries & Equipment, Forging And Foundry, Industrial Buildings	Training, Research And Industrial Services
Iran Info-Tech Development Co.	Information Technology, Computer Production, Software, Hardware, Communication And Education Development	Training, Research And Industrial Services
Iran Standard & Quality Inspection Co.	Consultancy Services For Quality Management, Training	Training, Research And Industrial Services
Iran Travel Agency Co Ltd.	Domestic & International Air Travel Services	Training, Research And Industrial Services
Iran Welding Research & Engineering Center	Industrial Research In Welding Fields	Training, Research And Industrial Services
MANA - Industrial Development & Renovation Construction Company	Civil Engineering & Construction	Training, Research And Industrial Services
Nashr Gostar Co.	Trading & Setting Up Exhibitions	Training, Research And Industrial Services
Nosaz Construction & Services Co.	Designing, Consulting, Renovation & Maintenance	Training, Research And Industrial Services
Rena Industrial Group Investment Co.	Investment. As of 2010, 85% of its portfolio invested in the automotive sector	Training, Research And Industrial Services
Shiraz Special Economic Zone	Developing Shiraz Electronic Economic Zone	Training, Research And Industrial Services
Iran International General Contraction Co.	Engineering, Procurement & Construction Services For Offshore & Onshore Major Industrial Projects Related To Oil, Gas And Petrochemical Industries.	Training, Research And Industrial Services
Industrial Renovation Company Of Iran (I.R.C.I)	Facilitate Effective Participation In Global Market And Elevate Competitiveness Potentials	Training, Research And Industrial Services
Industrial And Engineering Inspection Co. Of Iran (IEI)	Quality And Quantity Inspection Covering Sampling, Analysis, Witness Testing Of Cargo.	Training, Research And Industrial Services
Nimeh Hadi Emad/Emad Semicon Co.	Design And Manufacturing Of Electronic Integrated Circuit For Telecommunication, Automation, And Information Technology Industries	Training, Research And Industrial Services
Iran Industrial Development Investment Co.	Investment	Training, Research And Industrial Services
Advanced Materials Industrial Development Co. (Amid Co.)	Development, Investment And Contribution In Establishment Of Advanced Material Industries	Training, Research And Industrial Services
Biotechnology Development Company	Development Of Biotechnology Industry	Training, Research And Industrial Services
Alborz Industrial City Co. (A.I.C.Co)	Presenting Overall Urban Services And Facilities	Training, Research And Industrial Services
Fars Industrial And Export Development	Developing Shiraz Special Electronic Economic Zone	Training, Research And Industrial Services
Rasht Industrial City Co	Presentation Of Civil Services Construction	Training, Research And Industrial Services
Educational Equipment Industries	Designing, Production And Supply Of Educational Equipment, Teaching Aids And Tools For All Kinds Of Teaching Center, Laboratory And Workshop	Training, Research And Industrial Services
Shahrake Tahgigatie Kavosh	Preparation City, Road, Electricity, Water Appliances	Training, Research And Industrial Services
Life science Industry Development Company (LIDCO)		Training, Research And Industrial Services
Entrepreneurship Development Company Of Iran (EDCO)		Training, Research And Industrial Services
Management of Construction Projects Iran/Modiriat Projehaye Sakhtemany Iran (MAPSA)		Training, Research And Industrial Services
Iran Aviation Industries Co.	Study And Research On Aviation Equipment Manufacturing	Aviation Industries

== See also ==
- Economy of Iran
- IMIDRO
- Industry of Iran
- International rankings of Iran
- Iranian automobile industry
- Iranian railway industry
- List of Iranian companies
- National Iranian Oil Company
- National Iranian Petrochemical Company
- Privatization in Iran
- Science and technology in Iran
- Geological Survey and Mineral Exploration of Iran
