= Institute for Productivity & Human Resource Development =

- Company type: Subsidiary of Industrial Development and Renovation Organization of Iran
- Industry: Business management
- Founded: 1987; 38 years ago

Institute for Productivity & Human Resource Development (IPHRD) is an Iranian organization and a subsidiary of IDRO established since 1987.

== Activities ==
The main activities of this institute are:

- Business Excellence
- Quality Management
- Human Resources and Human Resource Management
- ISO
- EFQM
- Training and Consultancy

=== Iran Award ===
Iranian National Productivity and Business Excellence Award (or Iran Award) is an excellence award which is held every year from 2004 based on EFQM Excellence Model in Iran sponsored by large Iranian organizations authorities as well as Ministry of Industries and Mines.

=== Iranian Society of HRM ===
An Iranian society which work to increase the situation of HRM in Iran and also a member of SHRM.

=== HRD Conf ===
A yearly conference on Human Resource Development held from 2004.

== See also ==
- SHRM, Society for Human Resource Management.

== Related Sites ==
- IPHRD Official Website
- Iran Award Official Website
- Iranian Society of HRM Official Website
