= Zob Ahan =

Zob Ahan (Persian: ذوب آهن, also Romanized as "Zob-e Āhan" and "Zowb-e Āhan"), may refer to:

- Esfahan Steel Company, in Esfahan Province, Iran, which also goes by name Zob Ahan
- Zob Ahan Esfahan F.C., an Iranian football club owned by Esfahan Steel Company
