= National Iranian Copper Industries Company =

National Iranian Cooper Industry company

- Company type: Public
- Founded: 1971
- Headquarters: Tehran, Iran
- Website: nicico.com

National Iranian Copper Industries Company abbreviated as NICICO (Persian: شرکت ملی صنایع مس ایران, Sherkat-e Melli-ye Sânaye'e Mess-e Iran) is an Iranian publicly traded corporation. This company mines 700,000 tons of copper annually. As of 2020, total sales of the company topped 220 trillion rials (about $5.2 billion).

== Stakeholders ==
- IMIDRO (%12)

== Contractors ==
- Heavy Equipment Production Company (HEPCO)

== Mining locations ==
- Shahr-e Babak
- Sungun copper mine
