= Construction industry in Iran =

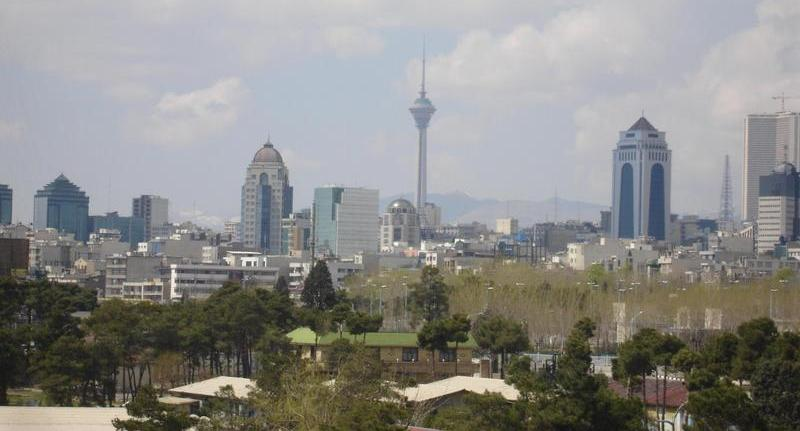
Seventy percent of Iranians own their homes according to Central Bank of Iran.

The construction industry of Iran is divided into two main sections. The first is government infrastructure projects, which are central for the cement industry. The second is the housing industry. In recent years, the construction industry has been thriving due to an increase in national and international investment to the extent that it is now the largest in the Middle East region. The Central Bank of Iran indicate that 70 percent of the Iranians own homes, with huge amounts of idle money entering the housing market. Iran has three shopping malls among the largest shopping malls in the world. Iran Mall is the largest shopping mall in the world, located in Tehran. The annual turnover in the construction industry amounts to US$38.4 billion. The real estate sector contributed to 5% of GDP in 2008. Statistics from March 2004 to March 2005 put the number of total Iranian households at 15.1 million and the total number of dwelling units at 13.5 million, signifying a demand for at least 5.1 million dwelling units. Every year there is a need for 750,000 additional units as young couples embark on married life. At present, 2000 units are being built every day although this needs to increase to 2740 units. Iran's construction market will expand to $154.4 billion in 2016 from $88.7 billion in 2013.

== History ==
For a decade after the revolution, the land question, especially in cities, was among the most contested issues in the Islamic Republic. The collapse of state authority, coupled with the populist convictions of the new regime and spontaneous popular land occupations labeled as "revolutionary housing", led to the dramatic expansion of cities. Tehran doubled in size within two years, and Ahvaz tripled in area from 23 to 75 square kilometres (9 to 29 sq mi). But only a small fraction of this geographic expansion was confiscated private land. The rest, more than 90 percent of the total distributed, had been public land. From 1979 to 1993 nearly half a million hectares of predominantly public unoccupied land was converted into private and cooperative residential property. New state institutions like the Urban Land Organization and the Housing Foundation played the key role in this massive transfer of property. By the mid-1980s more than 60 percent of all urban residential land transactions were being allocated by the state.

This large-scale transfer of mostly public land, coupled with the absence of enforceable regulation, transformed Iran’s urban geography. Between 1979 and 1982, 75 percent of all new construction in Tehran occurred outside the formal city limits, where satellite villages were transformed into sprawling suburbs. Remarkably, by 1986 urban housing stock had doubled, as Housing Ministry surveys showed that more than half of all urban dwellings in the entire country had been built after the revolution. It was private individuals who built these 2.3 million new units. The state merely transferred the public land into private hands; its share of investment in housing construction (affordable or otherwise) was less than 2 percent of the total after the revolution. Following an extraordinary boom in the Iranian real estate market between 2004 and 2007, activity in this market suddenly slowed down from early 2008. In 2009, construction activity was at its lowest level for the past eight years. Since 2010, this sector has experienced a modest recovery.

== Labour ==
In 2024 it was leaked that Chinese companies used Chinese prisoners as contractors for construction in Iran.

== Market ==
Age of residential units in Tehran ending 21 May 2015
1. Less than 5 years (54.0%)
2. 6–10 years (16.0%)
3. 11–15 years (17.0%)
4. 16–20 years (7.00%)
5. More than 20 years (6.00%)

The Central Bank of Iran indicate that 70 percent of the Iranians own homes, with huge amounts of idle money entering the housing market. The housing industry is one of the few segments of the Iranian economy where state capital shares as little as two per cent of the market, and the remaining 98 per cent is private sector investment. There is little red tape or hurdles and, as a result, through launching mass development projects, the use of new technologies and fast-pace project execution, a larger portion of the housing market is accessible. This is also true for new construction materials and technological advances.

Average price and cyclic growth rate of 1 m^{2} of housing in metropolitan areas (1992–2007) in USD
Metropolis	Average price for the 2nd half of 2007	Cyclic growth rate
Tehran	1,515	24.1
Mashhad	585	23.3
Esfahan	680	22.6
Tabriz	448	21.8
Shiraz	447	21.6
Karaj	657	23.1

Around 3 to 6 percent of housing units constructed yearly are solely for renting purposes. Around 20 percent of housing units in urban areas are rented. The average annual increase in house prices has been around 20 percent over the past ten years with a peak reached between 2006 and 2008. The average size of housing units has been around 80 square meters over the past five years. At present, the average price of a housing unit in urban areas is about 10 times the annual income of an urban household. Average construction cost for 1m² of urban residential buildings in the first half of 2008 was $350.

In 2011, Iran implemented a national electronic system for the registration and tracking of real estate transactions in order to bring more transparency to the market (97% of real estate transactions and ownership changes have been recorded in the new system).

=== Mehr housing scheme ===
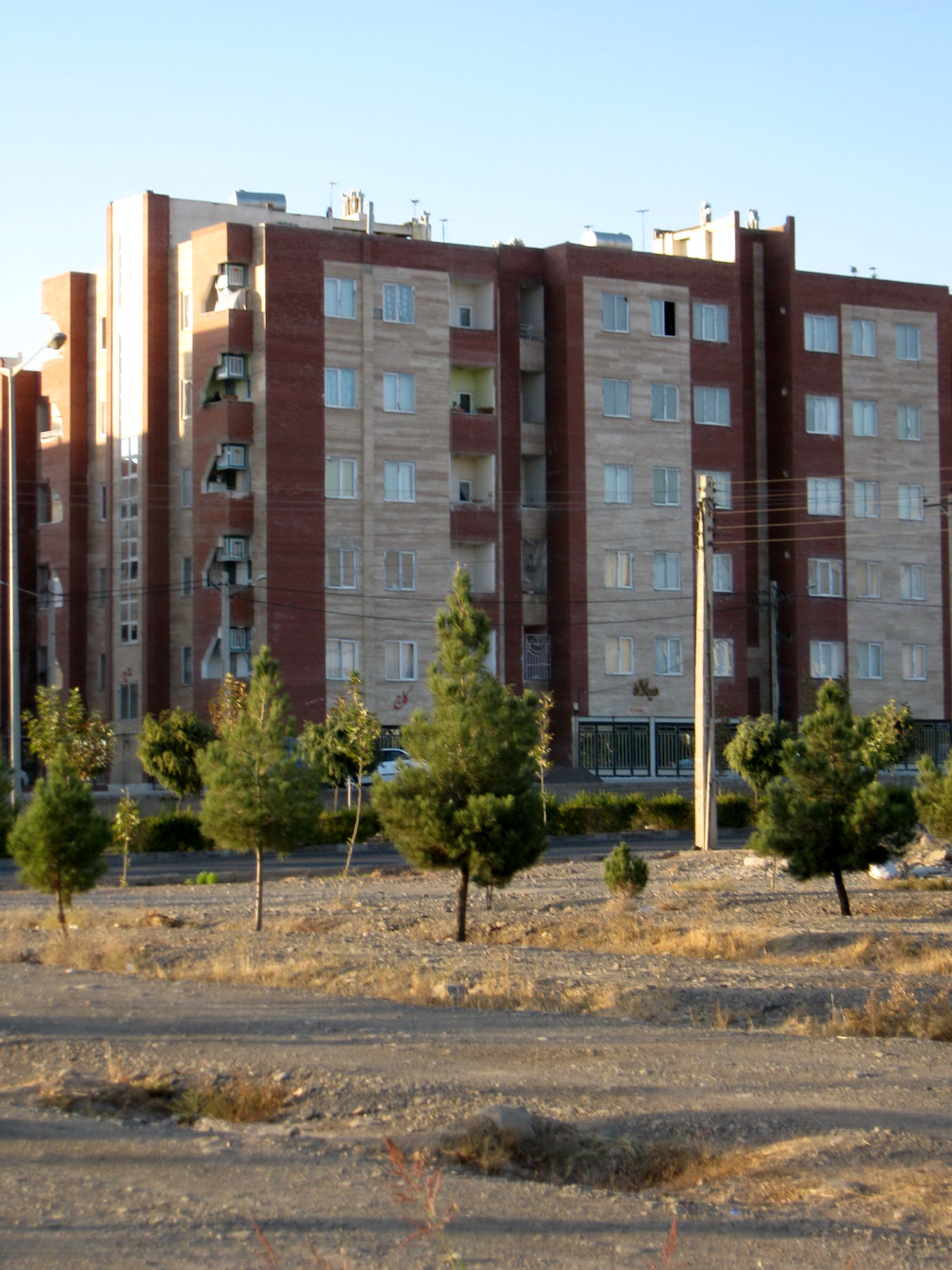
Mehr housing project in Iran

Mehr project, designed in 2007, aimed to cover a part of house shortage through building of around 2 million housing units within 5 years. As of January 2011, the banking sector, particularly Bank Maskan has given loans up to 102 trillion rials ($10.2 billion) to applicants of Mehr housing project. Under this scheme real estate developers are offered free lands in return for building cheap residential units for first-time buyers on 99-year lease contracts. The government then commissioned agent banks to offer loans to the real estate developers to prepare the lands and begin construction projects in an attempt to increase production and create equilibrium in the supply and demand curve (2008). Close to 400,000 units have been built and permits have been issued for another 12,000. About 3.7 million people have so far registered for Mehr Housing Plan (2008). About 10 million rials is to be paid by applicants for preparing the land and another 10 million to be given by the government in the form of banking facilities. Applicants should pay about 20 percent of the construction costs. In addition, about 140 million rials worth of housing loans will be granted to them (10,000 rials=1 USD in 2008). While most Iranians have difficulties obtaining small home loans, 90 persons have managed to secure collective facilities totaling $8 billion from banks. Problems regarding lack of utilities has been reported for the project, including lack of access to water, power, gas, and sewerage lines. Starting in 2014, the Mehr housing scheme will be taken off the balance sheet of the Central Bank of Iran. The government of President Rouhani announced that by 2017 the Mehr housing project will be replaced with cheap loans to needy families with the stated objective to build only 150,000 homes on a yearly basis.

=== Restorations ===
Restoration of old buildings is one of the priorities for the Government of Iran. Estimates show that about US$143 billion needs to be allocated in the next 10 years for restoration of 14,000 meters of critically decaying buildings. The government will earmark 11.5 percent of the funding while the rest will be supplied by public investment and bank loans (2007). The refurbishment of aged buildings nationwide has increased to $6.3 billion in 2010 from $3.3 billion in 2009. Another avenue for restoration in light of the new energy subsidy reform is to make housing more energy efficient in terms of heating. In addition, Iran’s geographical position over a seismic belt necessitates the reinforcement and renovation of housing. This is possible only through a boom in real-estate development and foreign investment.

=== Real estate investment ===
The housing sector plays an important role in the economy of Iran; it has links with 130 economic sectors, contributes to more than 20 percent of fixed capital formation each year, constitutes 25 percent of the balance of loans in the banking sector, 33 percent of household expenses are housing expenses, and the housing sector contributes around 12 percent of employment to the economy.

In terms of investment, the domestic rival markets of real estate market are gold, car and the Iranian bourse. Construction is one of the most important sectors in Iran accounting for 20–50% of the total private investment. One of the prime investment targets of well off Iranians as tangible. In Iran, only government employees pay their fair share of income taxes and no one pays a capital gains tax, which has allowed the rich to "squirrel away" their speculative real estate gains abroad. Prices for imported goods have increased somewhat along with global inflation but prices of non-tradables have increased at a much faster rate (with Tehran's real estate prices increasing by about 1,500–2,000% [sic] over the last 10 years), resulting in a highly overvalued currency and damaging Iran's competitiveness.

=== Mortgage financing ===
As of 2016, main mortgage lenders in Iran are:

Banks

- Bank Maskan,

Charities

- Housing Foundation of Islamic Revolution,
- Imam Khomeini Relief Foundation,
- State Welfare Organization of Iran.

== Statistics ==
Profile of the Macroeconomics and the Housing Sector in Iran
Source: Ministry of Housing & Urban Development	(2006–2007)
No. of Household	17.5 million
Housing stock	15.97 million units
Amount of investment in the housing of the whole country	21 billion dollars
Housing share of total capital formation	25–35%
Housing share of GDP	5.6%
Investment return	30%
Housing share of total employment	13%
Average annual demand for housing for the next 5 years	1.2 million units
Production of housing	838,000 units
Housing production per 1000 person	1.2 units

=== Housing ===
- 2003: 60 mil. square meter of buildings have been constructed
- Construction is mainly concentrated on urban areas and Tehran
- 2003: approx. 170,000 new urban construction projects. Close to 3 percent of houses built inside the country are prefabricated.
- 2003: investment of $3.6 bn into urban housing
- 2003: Housing Bank: US$1.3 bn for 217,000 loans
- Business Monitor International (BMI) forecasting a compound annual growth rate of 12.2 percent for 2008–2013. One of the main reasons for this growth is that there remains a severe shortage of housing stock in Iran wherein demand stands at around 1.5 million housing units per year, while only around 700,000 units are completed each year.

=== Industry ===
- 2003: 9,000 establishment permits for new industrial units plus expansion;
- 2003: 3,236 operation permits;
- Share of industrial construction in Iran: 3% (2005); 30% (2012).

Iranian contractors have been awarded several foreign tender contracts in different fields of construction of dams, bridges, roads, buildings railroads, power generation, and gas, oil and petrochemical industries. The availability of local raw materials, rich mineral reserves, experienced manpower have all collectively played crucial role in winning the international bids.

=== Government ===
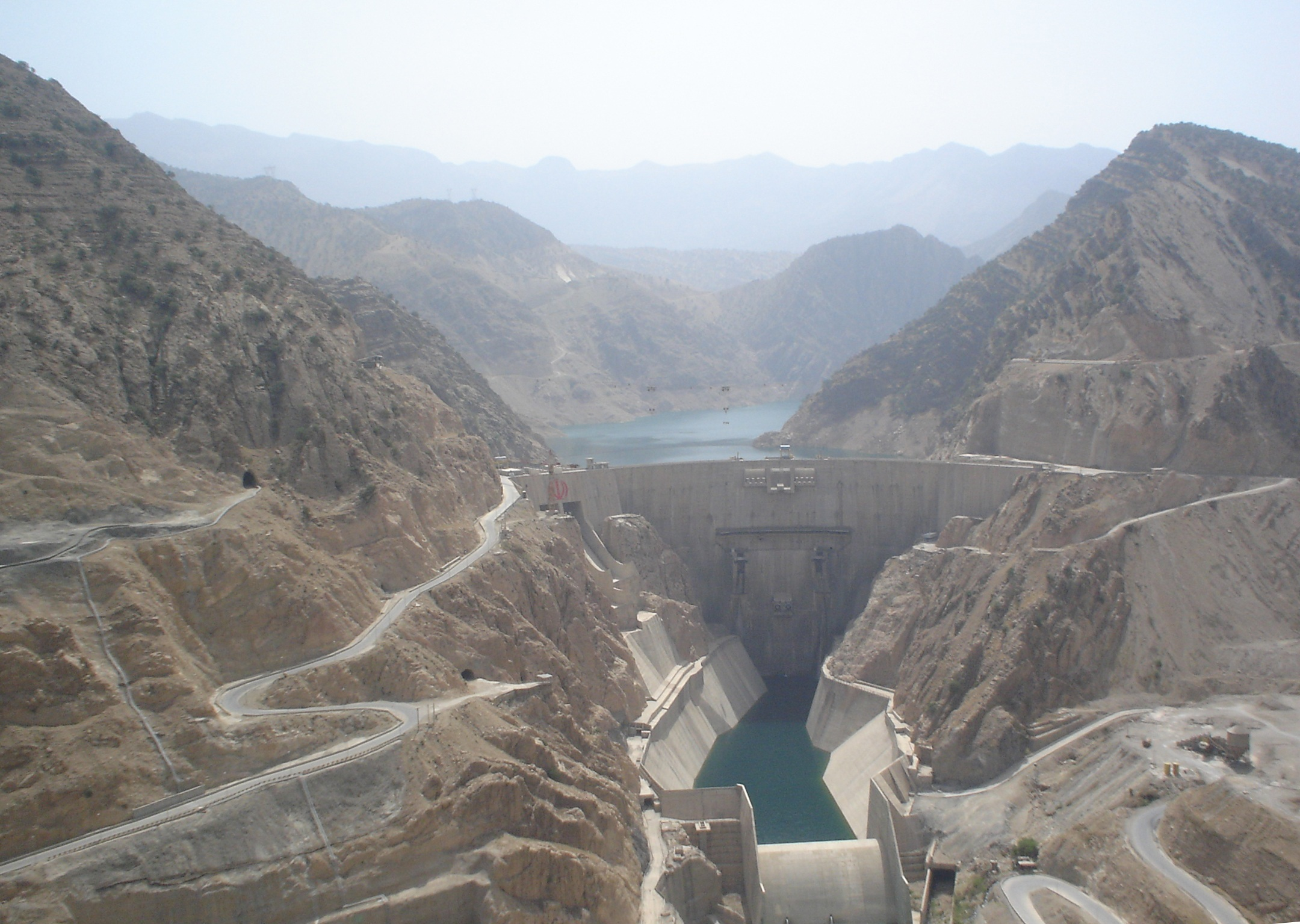
Karun-3 dam. Iran is among the world's largest dam builders.

- Development budget 2004: $6.7bn (US$3bn construction, US$1.7bn machinery, US$2bn Others)
- Iran is among the world's largest dam builders.

=== Construction materials ===
Part of the material is supplied by traditional markets such as the Tehran-based grand markets of iron and cement.

- 2003: 27mil. MT cement (2mil. MT export), steel, tiles, stones, fixtures, etc. Some 280 million square meters of tile and ceramic were produced in 2010. In 2014, Iran ranked fourth in the world in terms of tile and ceramic output with an annual production of 500 million square meters.
- According to the Industries and Mines Ministry, the current cement production in 2006/07 is over 40 million ton which 13.5% increased comparing with 2005/06. Iran reached self-sufficiency in cement production in 2009. Iran now produces 200,000 tons of cement per day and plans to export 25 million tons of cement per annum by 2010. There are 57 active production units in Iran.
- The largest float glass factory in the Middle East is located in Qazvin Province and produces 120,000 square meters of glass from 1.2 to 19 millimeter thickness on a daily basis, or 180,000 tons of glass annually. 30 percent of the output is exported to Europe.

=== Problems ===
- 2003: Despite increase in budget: insufficient support of government
- Specifically: lack of mass housing due to sharp increase of urban population
- Lack of financial facilities

=== Latest development ===
- Government/municipalities taking active steps to encourage private and foreign investment
- Introduction of housing bonds
- Emphasis on private sector; governmental companies to large extent barred from urban housing projects
- Government puts main emphasis on unfinished projects: Some statistics put the number of unfinished projects across Iran at about 50,000.
- Reform of technical standards & regulations
- Better statistics & transparencies

== Opportunities for foreign companies ==
Thousands of foreign firms, mainly Chinese or European, have established agents in Iran or partnerships with domestic manufacturers, both investing directly in the housing market and targeting other Persian Gulf markets.

- General: Iran has capable construction and engineering companies
- Mass housing. In 2010, five foreign companies from Turkey and South Korea have concluded contracts to build 40,000 houses in Iran in relation to the "Mehr national housing plan". Previously, companies from Malaysia and South Korea have won development contracts under the Mehr Housing project.
- New technology
- Large projects (dams, tunnels, industrial projects, oil industry). There are hundreds, perhaps thousands, of big tunnels in Iran.
- Joint projects in Iraq, Afghanistan (past: limited extent in Azerbaijan)
- Construction related machinery
- Requirements: Foreign financing required (ECGD)
- Team up with local partners required; local content

The Iran construction market is potentially ripe for the import of construction material to accommodate local demands.

According to the statistics presented by the Iran Imports Book, which is published by the Islamic Republic of Iran Customs Office, Iran’s major imported items in 2003 included:

- Block and tackle
- Cranes
- Digging and excavation machinery
- Elevator wares
- Hygienic products made of plastic and china
- Iron and steel (iron slabs and steel, iron and steel bars, rolled iron and steel wares)
- Plaster and cement
- Pre-fabricated buildings
- Road-building machinery
- Stonewares

Other imported items are: glass, timber flooring, lighting, paint, electrical and electronic fittings and accessories, lock, key hardware and aluminum for façade design.

== Industry standards ==
Manufacturers and suppliers are required to have ISO 9000 certification in order to export to Iran. European Union standards (EN, BSI, DIN, ANFOR, UNI, NNI, ON, IBN, IPQ, DS, NSF, SEE, SIS, NSAI, ELOT), North America National standards (ANSI, ASTM, AGI, API), Japan National Standard (JIS) and International Standards (ISO, CODEX, ITU, IEC) are also accepted in order to export to Iran.

Further information is available from the Institute of Standards and Industrial Research of Iran.

== See also ==
- Bank Maskan
- Banking and insurance in Iran
- Economy of Iran
- Healthcare in Iran
- HEPCO
- IMIDRO
- International rankings of Iran
- Iranian architecture
- Iranian labor law
- Iranian Offshore Engineering and Construction Company
- Khatam-al Anbiya Construction Headquarters
- List of dams and reservoirs in Iran
- List of earthquakes in Iran
- Transport in Iran
- Water supply and sanitation in Iran
