= Khorasan Steel =

Iranian steel manufacturer

Khorasan Steel Complex
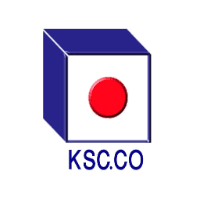
- Type: Public Company
- Industry: Steel
- Founded: 1989; 37 years ago
- Headquarters: Neyshabur, Iran
- Area served: Worldwide
- Subsidiaries: see below
- Website: www.kscco.ir

The Khorasan Steel Complex Company is an Iranian steel maker. It opened in the late 1980s, near Neyshabour and Firouzeh, Khorasan Razavi. It is Irans third largest steel producer and is directly controlled by the Ministry of Industries & Mines.

== See also ==
- Mining in Iran
