= Mining in Iran =

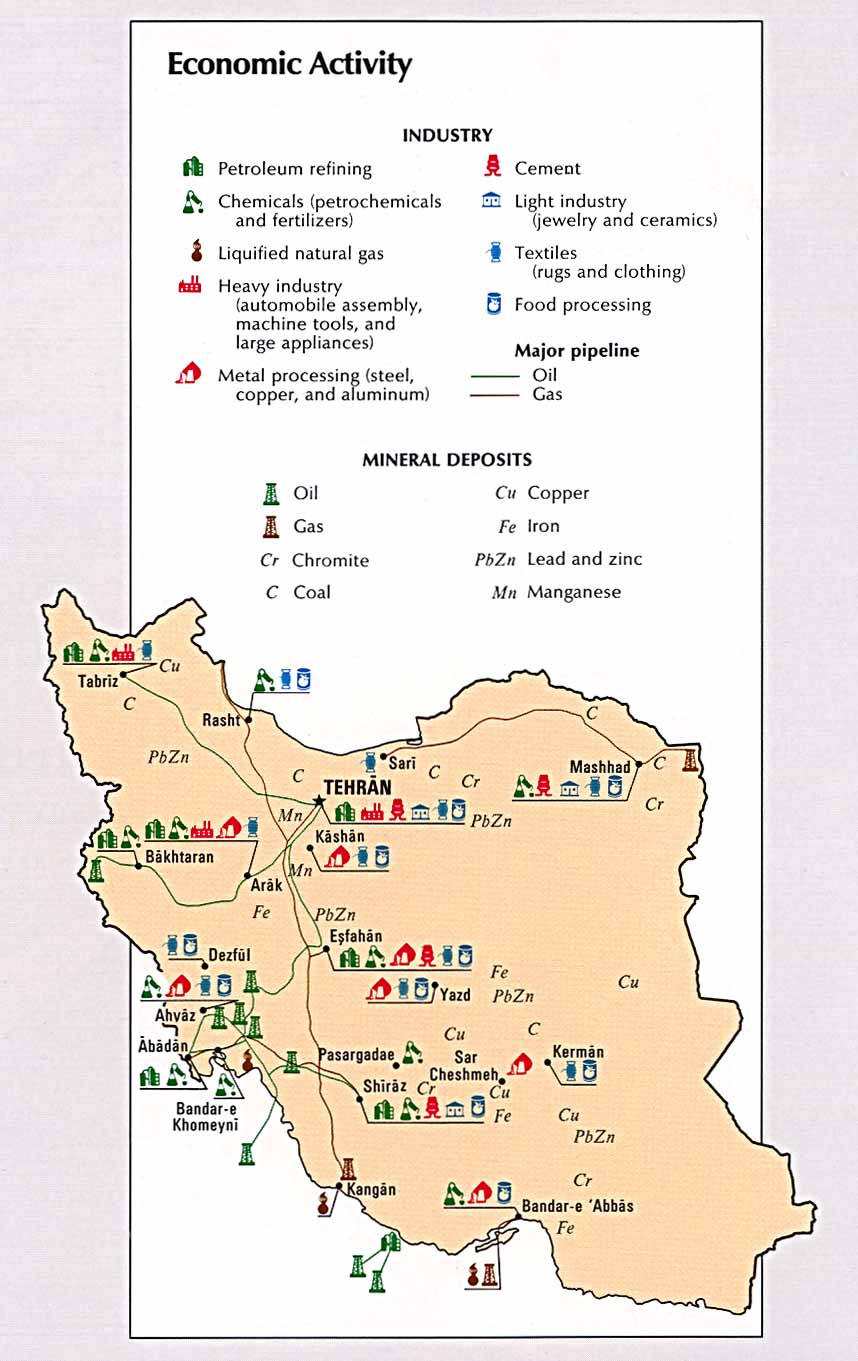
Industry and mining map of Iran

Mining in Iran is still under development, yet the country is one of the most important mineral producers in the world, ranked among 15 major mineral-rich countries, holding some 68 types of minerals, 37 billion tonnes of proven reserves and more than 57 billion tonnes of potential reserves worth $770 billion in 2014. Mineral production contributes only 0.6 percent to the country's GDP. Add other mining-related industries and this figure increases to just four percent (2005). Many factors have contributed to this, namely lack of suitable infrastructure, legal barriers, exploration difficulties, and government control.

The most important mines in Iran include coal, metallic minerals, sand and gravel, chemical minerals and salt. Khorasan has the most operating mines in Iran. Other large deposits which mostly remain underdeveloped are zinc (the world's largest), copper (world's ninth largest reserves in 2011, according to the managing director of National Iranian Copper Industries Company), iron (the world's 12th largest in 2013 according to the US Geological Survey), uranium (the world's tenth largest) and lead (world's eleventh largest). Iran with roughly 1% of the world's population holds more than 7% of the world's total mineral reserves.

In 2019, the country was the 2nd largest world producer of gypsum; the 8th largest world producer of molybdenum; the world's 8th largest producer of antimony; the 11th largest world producer of iron ore; the 18th largest world producer of sulfur, in addition to being the 21st largest worldwide producer of salt. It was the 13th largest producer in the world of uranium in 2018.

== Economics ==
Close to 30 percent of the country's investment has been made in the mining field in recent years. In 2008, forty five percent of the stock market's capitalization was in the mineral industries. In 2008 the share of the mining sector and mineral industries increased to over five percent in GDP. The sector with the highest profit margin among the top 100 Iranian companies in 2009 was mining, with a margin of 58%, while those in the Fortune 500 had a gross profit margin of 11%. In the first quarter of 2009–2010, Iran exported close to 5.6 million tons of mineral products worth over $1.2 billion. In 2009–2010 the mining sector had exports reaching $8.13 billion, accounting for about 32 percent of the country's non-oil exports. Every year, the iron ore price is determined by the government after negotiations between iron ore and steel producers. In 2008, the average price of iron ore was set at $56 per tonne. The steel, cement and iron ore prices are currently being liberalized in Iran. In March 2012, the Iran Mercantile Exchange (IME) announced the complete liberalisation of the sale price of raw steel and by-products. Iran's mineral reserves are valued at more than $770 billion (2014).

In 2005, of 3,125 operating mines, 2,747 and 378 mines were run by private and public sectors respectively. As of 2010, 5,574 mines are being exploited in 30 provinces of the country (which are active, inactive or in the state of being equipped). The rate of extraction from these mines stood at approximately 217.5 million tons in previous years. More than 100,000 people are presently engaged in the mines sector while as a whole some 500,000 people are employed in the mine sector. The number of operating mining units stands at 20,375. National Iranian mining company is the world's 23rd largest mining company with 0.6% of the world's total mining production.

Exploration projects implemented by the National Geology and Mineral Exploration Organization in the three years period of 2005–2008 are six times higher than the figure for the same period during the previous government. Since 2005, mortality rate in mining mishaps has declined to one death for every 10 million tons of mining production from the previous figure of six million tons.

== Commodities ==
Although the petroleum industry provides the majority of economic revenues, about 75 percent of all mining sector employees work in mines producing minerals other than oil and natural gas. These include coal, iron ore, copper, lead, zinc, chromium, barite (world's sixth largest producer), salt, gypsum, molybdenum, strontium, silica, uranium, and gold (most as a coproduct of the Sarcheshmeh copper complex operations). The mines at Sarcheshmeh in Kerman Province contain the world's second largest lode of copper ore (5% of the world's total). Some 128,500 tons were extracted in 2000–2001. Large iron ore deposits exist in central Iran, near Bafq, Yazd, and Kerman.

Iran produces orpiment and realgar arsenic concentrates, silver, asbestos, borax, hydraulic cement, clays (bentonite, industrial, and kaolin), diatomite, feldspar, fluorspar, turquoise, industrial or glass sand (quartzite and silica), lime, magnesite, nitrogen (of ammonia and urea), perlite, natural ocher and iron oxide mineral pigments, pumice and related volcanic materials, caustic soda, stones and decorative stones (including granite, marble, travertine, dolomite, and limestone), celestite, natural sulfates (aluminum potassium sulfate and sodium sulfate), amber, tungsten, agate, lapis lazuli and talc. Iran also produces ferromanganese, ferromolybdenum, nepheline syenite, demantoids, phosphate rock, selenium, shell, andalusite, rockwool, garnet, gabbro, diorite, vermiculite, attapulgite, calcium, barium, rare earth elements, scandium, yttrium and zeolite, and had the capacity to mine onyx. Iran also has large deposits of herbertsmithite around the city of Anarak.

=== Iron and steel ===
==== Iron ore ====
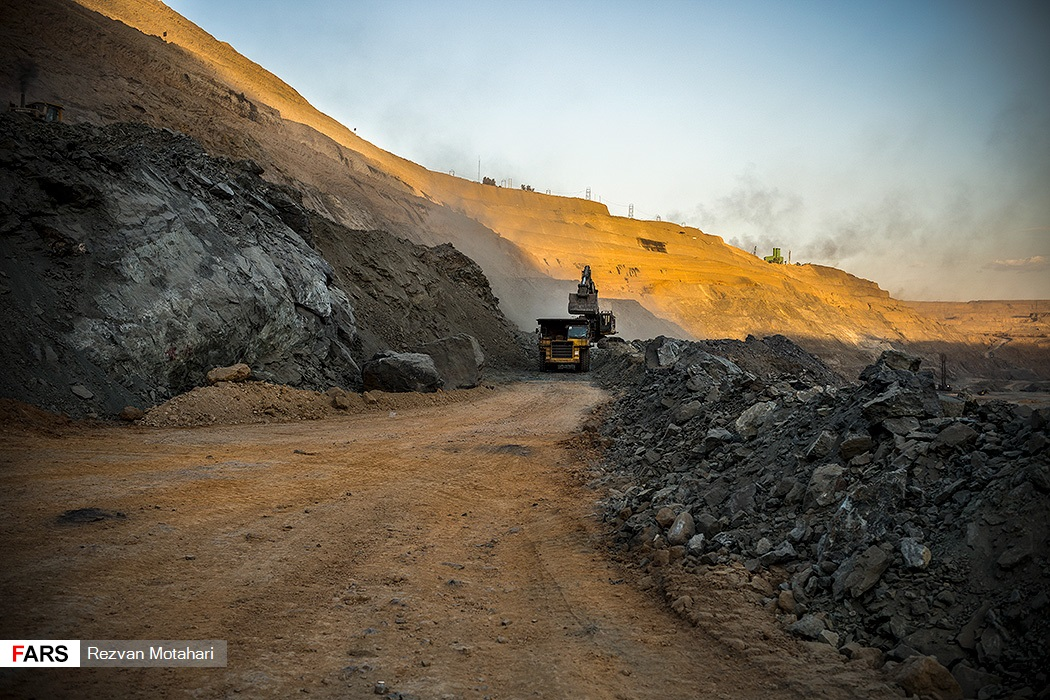
Gol Gohar mine, near Sirjan, is the largest iron mine in Iran.

In 2009 Iran produced 25.5 million tons of iron ore (fines, lumps and concentrate), – Alternatively, U.S. Geological Survey ranked Iran, the 8th largest producer of iron ore in 2009 with 33 million tons of output. Chadormalu and Gol Gohar Iron Ore are the two largest iron ore mines (accounting for more than 80% of iron ore production in Iran).

- Chadormalu Mining and Industrial Company produced 9,498,000 mt of iron ore. It is the largest iron ore producer listed on the Tehran Stock Exchange,
- Gol Gohar Iron Ore Company produced 7,209,000 mt of iron ore; Gol Gohar pellet plant near the southern city of Sirjan, the biggest of its kind in the Middle East, uses iron ore concentrates from the Gol-e-Gohar mine in the province. The new plant produces five million tonnes of iron ore per year; enough for production of 2.5 million tonnes of steel.
- Iran Central Iron Ore Company produced 5,310,000 mt, with the remainder produced by other smaller public sector miners. In 2009, Iran exported about 10 million metric tons of iron ore, mainly to China.
- Gohar Zamin Iron Ore Mine is expected to produce 140 million tons of ore by 2013.

In 2012, Iran opened a sponge iron plant in Hormozgan Province with a projected annual output of 1.8 million tons. Tariffs for the export of iron ore concentrate and pellet have been set at 50% and 35% respectively (2010). Starting in 2012, iron ore companies will pay tariffs for their excavation licenses 2% of the price of a tonne of steel billet for every tonne of iron ore that they sell.

==== Steel ====
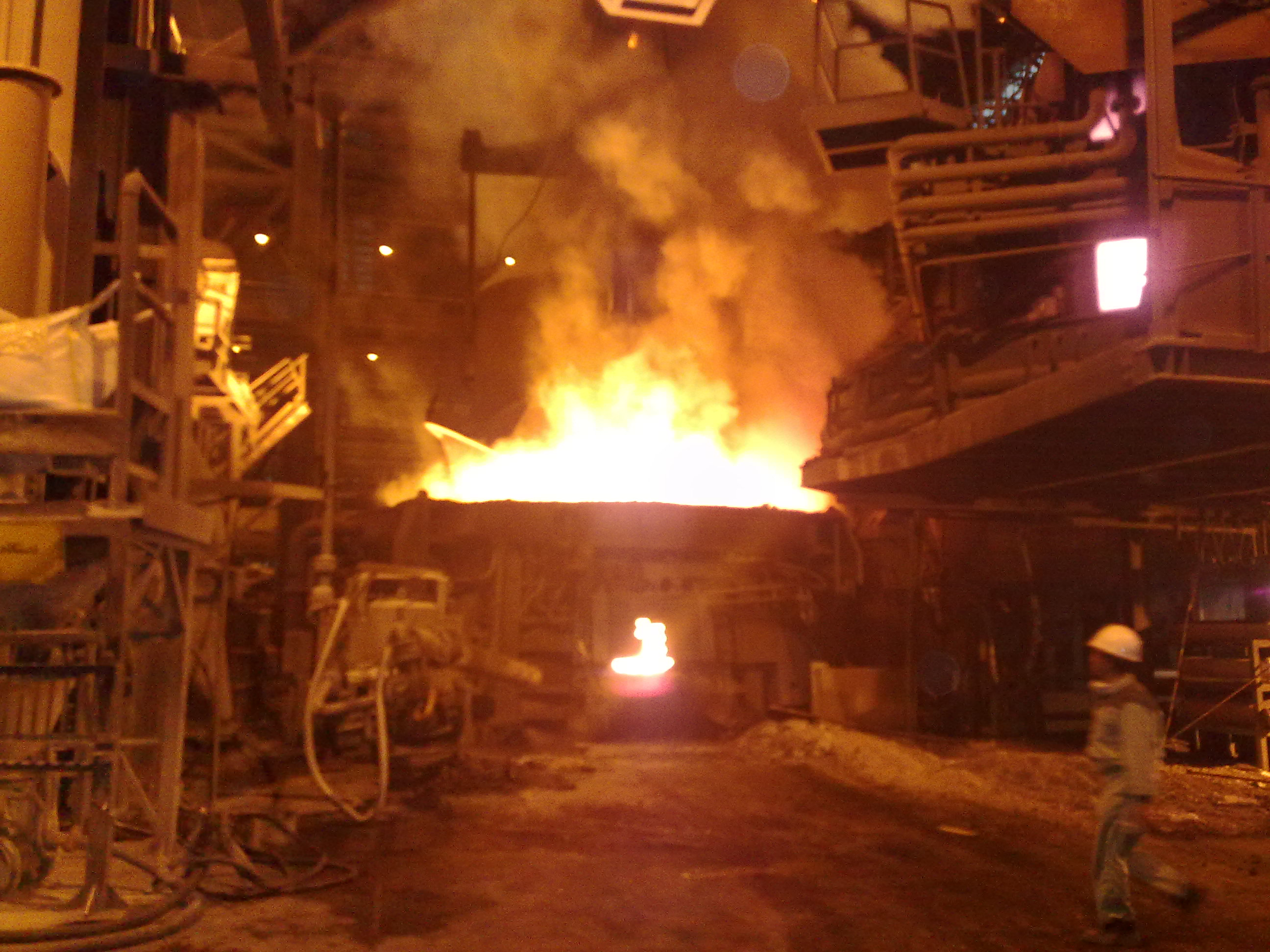
Mobarakeh Steel Mill in Isfahan is Iran's largest steel mill.

Prior to the Iranian revolution one of Iran's crowning transformations into an industrialized country was steel. The gigantic Soviet-built Aryamehr steel works in Isfahan was the leading industrial concentration in the country. In 1978, Aryamehr was producing in excess of 1.9 million tons of steel annually, and by 1985 it was slated to have an output of 8 million tons a year, making it one of the largest steel plants in the world. By 1985 had the revolution and war not destroyed everything-new plants at Ahwaz, Bandar Abbas, Isfahan, and other sites would have given Iran steel-producing capacity of over 15 million tons a year.

Steel production capacity will reach 17 million tons from 10 million tons in 2009 after the private and state projects come on stream, and 40 million tons over the long run. Main steel mills are located in Isfahan and Khuzestan.

Major raw steel producers in Iran are:

- Mobarakeh Steel Mill (47% market share as of 2010),
- Khouzestan Steel Company (23% market share, with new capacity of 80,000 tons),
- Isfahan Foundry (20% market share),
- Iran National Steel Industries Group (10% market share),
- Mazandaran Company (10% market share),

Other notable or new steel producers in Iran are:

- Azerbaijan Steel Company,
- Iran Steel Alloy Company,
- Ahvaz Pipe and Rolling Company,
- Khorasan Steel Company,
- Natanz Steel Complex, near the city of Isfahan with annual production capacity of 800,000 tonnes of steel rods and is the largest steel rod plant in the Middle East,
- Bonab Steel Complex, in the north-western province of East Azerbaijan. The first unit is a corrugated steel bar production line, with a production capacity of 1 million tonnes per annum and is the largest of its kind in the Middle East. The second unit is a steel ingot production plant, with an annual capacity of 500,000 tonnes.
- In 2010, Iran also inaugurated the largest galvanized sheet production plant for automobiles in the Middle East in the city of Shahr-e Kord. The plant, which was financed by Iran Khodro and SAIPA, has a capacity of 400,000 tpy.
- In 2012, a steel ingot plant was inaugurated in Hormozgan Province of Iran. The Hormozgan Steel Company has the initial production capacity of 1.5 million tons per year with the capacity to be extended to three million tons in a year. The plant has been built by an Iranian-German consortium (IRITEC, SMS-DEMAG).

Iran became self-sufficient in steel production in 2009. In 2008 Iran produced 7.5 million tons of direct reduced iron (DRI). It produces 13 percent of global DRI production and 41 percent of total Middle East DRI production. In addition, these projects have resulted in industrial decentralization, development of underprivileged regions, increase in GNP and promotion of industrial infrastructure. Iran is the world's 16th steel producer.

=== Bauxite and aluminium ===
==== Bauxite ====
In 2009 Iran will produce 230,000 tons of bauxite.

==== Aluminium ====
Iran's aluminium production is targeted to exceed 400,000 tonnes in 2012 and 1.5mnt by 2022. Planned projects include Alumina Mine's 100,000tpa aluminium production project in North Khorasan Province, 276,000tpa South Aluminium project as well as the 375,000tpa Khuzestan Aluminium project. As at 2012, the largest plants for aluminium production in Iran are:

- Iranian Aluminium Company,
- Almahdi,
- Hormozal aluminium smelter plant in Bandar Abbas. The newly built Hormozal plant with an annual production capacity of 147,000 tonnes is a joint venture between Iran and Italy.

=== Coal ===
Iran has recoverable proven coal reserves of nearly 1.9bn short tonnes, and with total estimated coal reserves of more than 50 billion short tonnes. By mid-2008, the country produced about 1.3m short tonnes of coal annually and consumed about 1.5m short tonnes, making it a small net importer of coal. Iran plans to increase hard-coal production to 5 million tons in 2012 from 2 million tons in November 2008. Major coal producers and exporters in Iran are:

- Kerman Coal Company,
- Eastern Alborz Coal Company, and
- Central Alborz Coal Company.

==== Coke ====
In 2015 Iran produced 1.7 million tons of coke.

=== Zinc and lead ===
Iran has over 220 million tonnes of proven zinc and lead ore reserves. With approximately 11 million tonnes of zinc metal constituent and 5 million tonnes of lead metal constituent, Iran has just below 5% of the world's metal constituent reserves. Two important mines in Iran are:

- Mahdi-Abad, which has 75 million tonnes of ore with a zinc concentration of 6% and a lead concentration of 2.7%,
- Angouran mine, which has 16 million tonnes of ore with a zinc concentration of 26% and a lead concentration of 6%.

In 2009, with approximately 165,000 tonnes of production, Iran ranked first in the Middle East and 15th in the world in terms of zinc and lead production. In 2009, Iran exported 77,000 tonnes of zinc and lead concentrate and ingot.

The largest or most profitable producers of zinc and lead in Iran are:

- Iran Zinc Mines Development Group (largest producer),
- Bama Mining & Industrial Co.,
- Bafgh Mines Co.,
- Calsimin Co. (the largest zinc producer in the Middle East)

=== Uranium ===
Iran is believed to have large reserves of uranium to use as nuclear fuel in different parts of Iran including Bandar Abbas, Yazd, North Khorasan and Iranian Azerbaijan.

In 2018 and 2019, Iran produced 84 tonnes of U_{3}O_{8} (yellowcake) per year (est.), entirely sourced from domestic mines. Because of the country's well-developed uranium mining industry, the Islamic Republic was processing more uranium ore for nuclear fuel and medical applications than Pakistan.

=== Fluorite ===
Mazandaran, a valuable reserve of Iran's minerals. The extraction of more than 22 million minerals and the employment of more than four thousand people have turned mines into golden treasures in Mazandaran.

=== Copper ===
In 2009 Iran produced 383,000 tons of copper. As of 2011, Iran had the world's 9th largest reserves of copper at 32.5 million tons. The mines at Sarcheshmeh in Kerman Province contain the world's second largest lode of copper ore (5% of the world's total). As of 2010, Iran ranked 10th in copper production and 17th in copper cathodes production (220,000 tons). In 2009, Iran exported $1.2 billion worth of copper cathodes. National Iranian Copper Industries Company (NICICO) is one of the largest companies listed on the Tehran Stock Exchange and was the largest non-oil exporter in Iran in 2010 with exports worth $1.3 billion.

=== Gold ===
Iran's total gold reserves (below ground) are estimated at 320 metric tons. Based on a short-term program (2008), gold production will reach five tons per year. Under the long-term plan, the figure will rise to 25 tons per annum. The main gold-rich regions in Iran are:

- Meydouk in Shahr-e Babak (Kerman Province),
- Khorapeh in Piranshahr (West Azerbaijan Province),
- Nabijan in Kalaybar, (East Azerbaijan Province)
- Andaryan in Varzaqan County, East Azerbaijan Province
- Alikh in Jolfa (East Azerbaijan Province),
- Logheh (Zanjan Province),
- Qolqoleh (Kurdistan Province),
- Saqqez, in the west,
- Piranshahr in the west,
- Maherabad, in the east,
- Sheikhabad, in the east.

The gold mine in the city of Takab in West Azerbaijan Province (Iran's largest gold mine until 2012) has over 4 tons of proven gold reserves and 5.81 grams of gold can be netted from each ton of gold ore extracted from the mine. In 2012, three new gold mines with 16 tons of proven net gold deposits have been discovered in Saqqez city in the western province of Kurdistan. As of 2014, gold ore reserves of Zareh Shuran mine in West Azerbaijan (largest gold plant in the M.E.) are estimated at 20 million tons with an average grade of 5.5 gram per ton which is considered one of the most valuable known mines in the country.

In 2020, provincial officials announced the discovery of large gold reserves in southeast Sistan and Baluchestan after extensive exploration and survey stages were completed. A license for the exploration of the mine with a definite reserve of eight tonnes of gold was issued. Iranian officials dubbed Sistan and Baluchestan the "mineral rainbow" of Iran, with the most lucrative reserves of antimony, titanium, copper and gold.

=== Cement ===
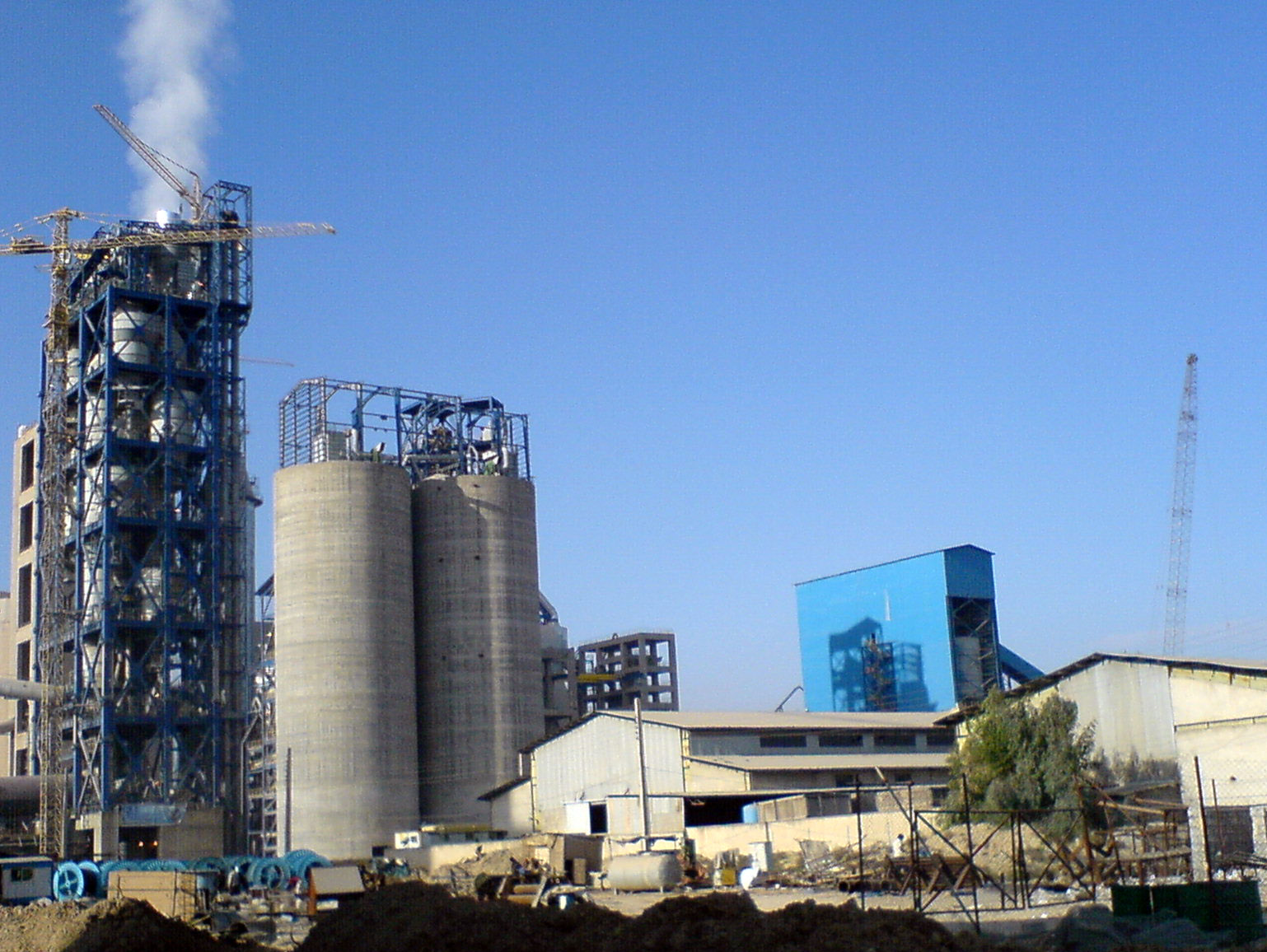
A cement factory in Khuzestan Province

In 2009, IMIDRO reported that 9 countries including Syria, Venezuela, Bolivia, Algeria, Lebanon, Ecuador, Iraq, Belarus and one of the Mid-Asian countries will have cement plants which will be constructed by Iranian engineers. Iran is the 8th cement producer in world and 2nd in the Middle East, after Turkey. In 2009 Iran produced some 65 million tons of cement per year and exported to 40 countries. There are 57 active production units in Iran as of 2010. As of 2010, 28 cement companies were listed on the Tehran Stock Exchange. Iran constitutes 1.8% of the world's cement production and 1.6% of the world's cement consumption. The main producers of cement are:

- Fars & Khuzestan Group is Iran's largest producer of cement with a market share of 24%,
- Abyek with 8% market share,
- Tehran with 7% market share,
- Sepahan with 6% market share.

Cement production/prices in Iran are being liberalized since 2008. The cement industry is one of the economic sectors that will be hit the hardest in Iran following of the 2010 subsidy reform plan, because many Iranian cement factories are energy-inefficient.

== Foreign investments ==
The government owns 90 per cent of all mines and related large industries in Iran and is seeking foreign investment for the development of the mining sector. In the steel and copper sectors alone, the government is seeking to raise around US$1.1 billion in foreign financing.

In the early 1990s the buy-back method of transaction (the government buys back the industrial project after the foreign direct investor has recouped his initial investment in the project plus a predefined profit) was introduced to bypass constitutional constraints on foreign investment and avoid potential political difficulties within the country. The scheme has government support for being an efficient means of attracting foreign capital, services and technical expertise, while reducing foreign exchange expenditures and expanding exports. If the Iranian Government is to fulfil its 20-year plan to improve the country's mining sector, it's estimated that US$20 billion, mostly in foreign investment, will be required.

- Projects eligible for buy-back agreements and foreign loan facilities are:

Projects that complete aluminium production lines
Projects that mobilise coal, iron ore, steel, copper and pigment metals production
Ferro alloys projects and gold production

- Iran imports the following equipment to support its mining sector:

Mining equipment such as drills, loaders and shovels
Support equipment such as bulldozers, graders, trucks and auxiliaries
Utility equipment such as compressed air plant equipment, water and waste-water treatment equipment
Mechanical equipment including equipment for crude ore handling, grinding, separation and treatment purposes
Laboratory and workshop equipment
Power supply and distribution equipment
Process control instruments

Most of the electrical distribution equipment for water supply and treatment utilities, along with steelworks and storage facilities are manufactured locally. There is a demand for high quality second-hand machinery in Iran. To date, doing business in Iran has had political overtones. In this regard, countries which can maintain a neutral and impartial political image in the Middle East are advantaged.

== Production statistics ==
Iran's mineral produce include coal, metallic elements, sand and gravel, chemical minerals and salt. It has the world's largest zinc reserves, holds the second largest copper deposits and ranks ninth for its iron reserves. The following is a list of some of Iran's industrial mining production and their international rankings:

Rankings
Name	World ranking	Annual production	Year	Source	Notes
Steel	10th	31.1 million tonnes	2024	World Steel Association/US Geological Survey	Iran plans to increase steel production to 35 mn tonnes/year by 2015 and to 55 mn tonnes by 2020
Aluminium oxide	26th	130,000 tonnes	2006	British Geological Survey	
Bauxite	10th	500,000 tonnes	2008	US Geological Survey	
Copper	12th	249,100 tonnes	2006	British Geological Survey	
Aluminium	17th	457,000 tonnes	2006	List of countries by aluminium production	
Cement	5th	45 million tonnes	2009	List of countries by cement production Pie Chart of World's Production	Iran ranks 10th globally in terms of cement export
Iron	7th	75 million tonnes	2024	US Geological Survey	
Manganese	12th	115,000 tonnes	2006	British Geological Survey	
Strontium	5th		2007	British Geological Survey	World's 5th largest producer of strontium
Zinc	14th	166,000 tonnes	2006	US Geological Survey	
Chromium production	5th		2002	US Geological Survey	Iran produces more than 4% of world's production
Feldspar	12th	411,807 tonnes	2006	British Geological Survey	
Bentonite	12th	186,323 tonnes	2006	British Geological Survey	Alternatively ranked at 13th by US Geological Survey
Molybdenum	9th	2,000 tonnes	2005	British Geological Survey	
Sodium Chloride	15th	620,000 tonnes	2006	British Geological Survey	~1.25% of world's production
Baryte	6th	290,000 tonnes	2006	Baryte Production Rankings	~3.67% of world's production
Gypsum	2nd		2006	British Geological Survey	Iran is the world's second largest producer after China
Iron ore	9th	35 million tonnes	2006	British Geological Survey	
Perlite	10th	30,000 tonnes	2006	British Geological Survey	
Silver	19th	90 tonnes	2008	The Silver Institute	
Turquoise	1st		2010		Iran is the world's oldest, finest and largest producer of turquoise
Soda Ash	20th	140,000 tonnes	2006	US Geological Survey	
Quicklime, hydrated lime including Dead-Burned Dolomite	13th	2.5 million tonnes	2006	US Geological Survey	
Natural iron oxide	9th	2,600 tonnes	2006	US Geological Survey	
Mica	9th	7,000 tonnes	2006	US Geological Survey	
Magnesite	13th	90,000 tonnes	2006	US Geological Survey	
Lead	16th	24,000 tonnes	2006	US Geological Survey	
Kaolin	12th	550,000 tonnes	2006	US Geological Survey	
Industrial silica	14th	1.9 million tonnes	2006	US Geological Survey	
Hydraulic cement	14th	32.7 million tonnes	2006	US Geological Survey	
Gold	66th	0.85 tonnes	2008	British Geological Survey	
Ferrochromium	14th	8,000 tonnes	2006	US Geological Survey	
Diatomite	20th	8,000 tonnes	2006	US Geological Survey	
Celestite	6th	7,500 tonnes	2006	US Geological Survey	
Boron	9th	3,000 tonnes	2006	US Geological Survey	
Asbestos	9th	5,000 tonnes	2006	US Geological Survey	
Arsenic	11th	100 tonnes	2006	US Geological Survey	
Ammonia	21st	1.02 million tonnes	2006	US Geological Survey	
Nepheline syenite	4th	75,000 tonnes	2007	British Geological Survey	
Phosphorite	27th	62,000 tonnes	2011	British Geological Survey	
Sulfur and Pyrite	12th	1.6 million tonnes	2011	British Geological Survey	
Uranium	13th	71 tonnes	2018	World Nuclear Association	

== Mines ==
- Mehdiabad mine (Lead, Zinc)
- Sungun copper mine

== See also ==
- Ministry of Industries and Mines (Iran)
  - National Geoscience Database of Iran
- Iran Chamber of Commerce, Industries, Mines & Agriculture
- Industry of Iran
- Construction industry of Iran
- Petroleum industry in Iran
  - National Iranian Oil Company
- List of companies of Iran
  - Bank of Industry and Mine
  - IMIDRO
  - HEPCO
- Economy of Iran
- Privatization in Iran
- Foreign direct investment in Iran
- International rankings of Iran
