= Sarcheshmeh =

Mine in Kerman, Iran

Sarcheshmeh Copper Complex كارخانجات مجتمع مس سرچشمه
- Village
- Location within Iran
- Coordinates: 29°59′05″N 55°51′14″E
- Province: Kerman
- County: Rafsanjan
- Bakhsh: Central
- Rural District: Sarcheshmeh

Population (2006)
  - Total: 53
- Time zone: UTC+3:30 (IRST)
  - Summer (DST): UTC+4:30 (IRDT)

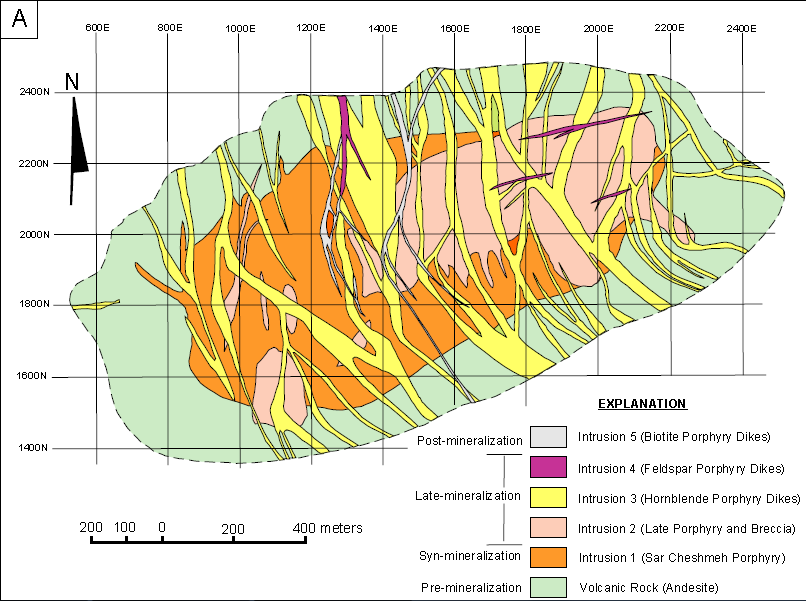
Sar Cheshmar copper mining geological map

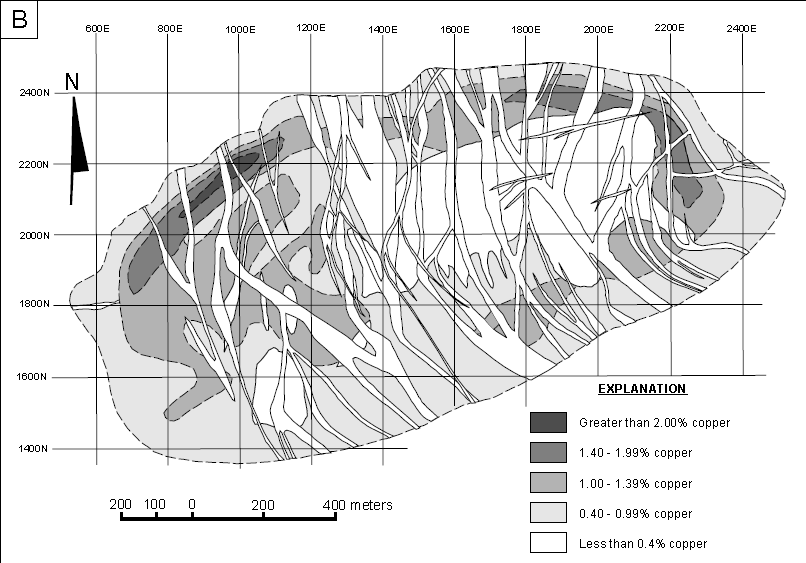
Sar Cheshmeh Copper concentrations

External image
- Sarcheshmeh copper mine, 2008

Sarcheshmeh Copper Complex
- Interactive map of Sarcheshmeh Copper Complex
- Products: Copper
- Company: IMIDRO
- Website: http://www.imidro.org
- Acquired: 1972

Sarcheshmeh (سرچشمه) or Sarcheshmeh Copper Complex (Persian: كارخانجات مجتمع مس سرچشمه – Kārkhāneh-ye Mojtame‘-e Mes-e Sar Cheshmeh) is a large open cast copper mine in the Kerman Province of Iran, considered to be the second largest copper deposit worldwide. Also containing substantial amounts of molybdenum, gold and other rare metals. It is also a settlement, enumerated at Iranian census.

The Sarcheshmeh Copper Complex is located 65 km southwest of Kerman and 50 km south of Rafsanjan. The region's altitude averages about 2600m, the highest spot of which approximates 3000m. Sarcheshmeh ore bodies, situated in the central part of Zagros ranges, consist of folded and faulted early tertiary volcano-sedimentary rocks.

Sar Cheshmeh mine was managed by the Anaconda Group until the 1979 revolution in Iran. Design and construction of the processing plant was done by Parsons-Jurden of the US.

Production units of Sarcheshmeh Copper Complex involve the mine itself, concentrator, smelter, refinery, foundries and leaching.

Administratively, the settlement is in the Sarcheshmeh Rural District, in the Central District of Rafsanjan County, Kerman Province, Iran. At the 2006 census, its population was 53, in 14 families.

== See also ==
- Mining in Iran
- International rankings of Iran
