= Mehdiabad mine =

Lead and zinc mine in Yazd, Iran

- Interactive map of Mehdiabad mine
- Location: Yazd Province, Iran; 31°28′44″N 54°59′52″E
- Products: Lead, Zinc

The Mehdiabad mine is one of the largest lead and zinc mines in Iran. It is located in central Iran in Yazd Province. The mine has reserves amounting to 394 million tonnes of ore grading 4.2% zinc, resulting in 16.5 million tonnes of zinc.

== See also ==
- Mining in Iran
