= Esfahan Steel Company =

Iranian steel manufacturing corporation

- Type: Public
- Industry: Steel
- Founded: 1967
- Headquarters: Esfahan, Iran
- Area served: Worldwide
- Website: www.esfahansteel.com

Zob Ahan AryaMehr
English: Anthem of the Steel Industry of Iran

Audio sample
- Esfahan Steel Company: file; help

Esfahan Steel Company (Persian: شرکت ذوب‌آهن اصفهان, Sherkat-e Zob Āhan-e Esfahān), formerly known as Esfahan Aryamehr Steel Company (Persian: شرکت ذوب آهن آریامهر) prior to 1979 Revolution, opened in late 1960s, based close to the cities of Fooladshahr and Zarrinshahr, Esfahan Province. It is Iran's third largest steel producer and is directly controlled by the Ministry of Industries & Mines.

== History ==
The company was established under a 1966 Iran–Soviet agreement. It began construction in 1968 and started production in 1972, launching steelmaking and rolling operations in 1973. In 2013, with completion of the Tawazun project, it reached a capacity of 3.6 million tons of molten iron.

== Manufacture ==
As Iran's first steel producer, the company manufactures structural steel sections, beams, bars, coils, and specialty steels. It supplies railway rails for high-speed trains, subways, national railways, and mining projects, as well as wide H-beams for industrialized construction and specialized steel arches for deep mining operations.

== See also ==
- Mining in Iran
- Mobarakeh Steel Company
