= IMIDRO =

IMIDRO Sāzman-e Tose'e va Nosāzi-ye Ma'āden va Sanāye'-e Ma'dani-ye Irān
- Company type: Government-owned corporation
- Industry: Conglomerate
- Founded: 2001
- Headquarters: Tehran, Iran
- Area served: Worldwide
- Key people: Mohammad Masoud Samiei nejad, CEO and Chairman of the Board of IMIDRO
- Products: Heavy industry, Manufacturing, Mines, Metals, Investment
- Revenue: ▲US$ 0.5 billion (2010)
- Number of employees: 5,000+
- Website: IMIDRO

Iranian Mines & Mining Industries Development & Renovation, known as IMIDRO, is a major state-owned holding company active in the mining sector in Iran. IMIDRO has 8 major companies and 55 operational subsidiaries active in steel, aluminum, copper, cement and mineral exploitation fields.

In 2002, IMIDRO and its subsidiaries had 49.3 thousand employees with a total asset value of 33.5 thousand billion Rials. In 2002 IMIDRO subsidiaries' annual turnover value was estimated at 3.23 thousand billion Rials and their export at 448 million dollars in 2002.

== Foreign projects ==
In 2009, IMIDRO reported that 9 countries including Algeria, Belarus, Bolivia, Ecuador, Iraq, Lebanon, Syria, and Venezuela would have cement plants which will be constructed by Iranian engineers.

That same year, Iran produced some 65 million tons of cement per year and exported to 40 countries.

== Main subsidiaries ==
- Al-Mahdi Aluminum Company
- Ehdas Sanat Company (ESC) - Cement company
- Esfahan Steel Company (ESCO)
- Heavy Equipment Production Company (HEPCO)
- Iranian Aluminum Company (IRALCO)
- Iranian Minerals Production and Supply Company (IMPASCO)
- Khouzestan Steel Company (KSC)
- Mobarakeh Steel Company (MSC)
- National Iranian Copper Industries Company (NICICO)
- National Iranian Steel Company (NISCO)
- Ministry of Industries and Mines Institute for Training & Research (ITR)
- Persian Gulf Mining & Metal Industries Special Zone (PGSEZ)

== See also ==
- List of steel producers
- Mining in Iran
- Construction in Iran
- Privatization in Iran
- IDRO Group
- Geological Survey and Mineral Exploration of Iran
