= Iran Marine Fund =

- Industry: Iran Marine Fund
- Founded: 2010; 16 years ago
- Headquarters: Tehran, Iran
- Key people: Mohammad-Saed Mahmoudi (CEO)
- Website: www.imf.ir

Iran Marine Fund (IMF) is a state-owned enterprise of the Ministry of Industry, Mine and Trade of The Islamic Republic of Iran that works to convert the country's marine capacities into sustainable national interests.

The fund was established to enable sustainable development in Iran's marine industry. It acts as an interface between the government and the private sector, while also providing developmental and strategic support. The Marine Industries Development Fund was established by Article 1 of the Marine Industries Development and Support Law, approved on 5 August 2008, by the Islamic Consultative Assembly. The Fund was approved by the Council of Ministers on 2 July 2010.

== Objectives ==
The Fund objectives are to achieve sustainable development in the marine industry: interpretation, regulation and implementation of support to the marine industries in areas such as construction, repair, supply chain development and service and facilitation in solving problems and resolving deterrent factors that may hinder development.

== Tasks ==
The Fund undertakes:

- Planning
- Financial support
- Preferential tariff subsidizing domestic manufacturers that have won international tenders while maximizing use of native technical, engineering, production, industrial and executive forces
- Support for domestic shipbuilders directly and by assisting applicants who purchase locally-built vessels
- Subsidies for domestic manufacturers by covering part of unforeseen cost increases for materials and equipment for ship/marine construction
- Subsidies to compensate for delays as a result of using ships from domestic manufacturers;
- Subsidies equivalent to applicant income tax paid by domestic standards-compliant vessel owners
- Subsidies equivalent to applicant income tax for ship repair in domestic yards for Iran-flagged ships

== Fund mission ==
Facilitate the achievement of sustainable marine development through providing credit, technical and software assistance, investment and developmental research.

== Policies ==
- Support ship construction/repair and marine industries
- Secure supply chain
- Reduce investment risks
- Support coastal development and water accessibility
- Expand transit and re-export
- International partnerships
- Develop exports
- Encourage standards compliance
- Develop marine insurance
- Participate in offshore industries.
- Support private and public sector needs

== Article 1 of Marine Industries Development and Support Law ==
The government was permitted to establish the Marine Industries Development Fund (hereinafter referred to as "Fund") with initial capital of four hundred billion rials (Rls.400,000,000,000), in order to study, define, regulate and enforce support of the Marine Industries (manufacturing, production, repair and maintenance of various types of surface, surface effect and submersible vessels and offshore industry), and solve the problems and deterrents factors in compliance with environmental considerations, as stated in the statute.

== See also ==
- Economy of Iran
- Industry of Iran
