= Saghandel =

Saghandel سغندل
- Village
- Location within Iran
- Coordinates: 38°29′56″N 46°43′05″E
- Country: Iran
- Province: East Azerbaijan
- County: Varzaqan
- Bakhsh: Central
- Rural District: Ozomdel-e Jonubi

Population (2006)
  - Total: 157
- Time zone: UTC+3:30 (IRST)
  - Summer (DST): UTC+4:30 (IRDT)

Saghandel (Persian: سغندل, also Romanized as Saqam Del, Saqandel, Sekendī, Seqendel, Sikindil, and Sykyndyl’) is a village in Ozomdel-e Jonubi Rural District, in the Central District of Varzaqan County, East Azerbaijan Province, Iran. At the 2006 census, its population was 157, in 34 families.

The cuneiform inscription in the village is the most famous historical monument in the region from the Urartian era.
