= Sungun copper mine =

Copper mine in East Azerbaijan, Iran

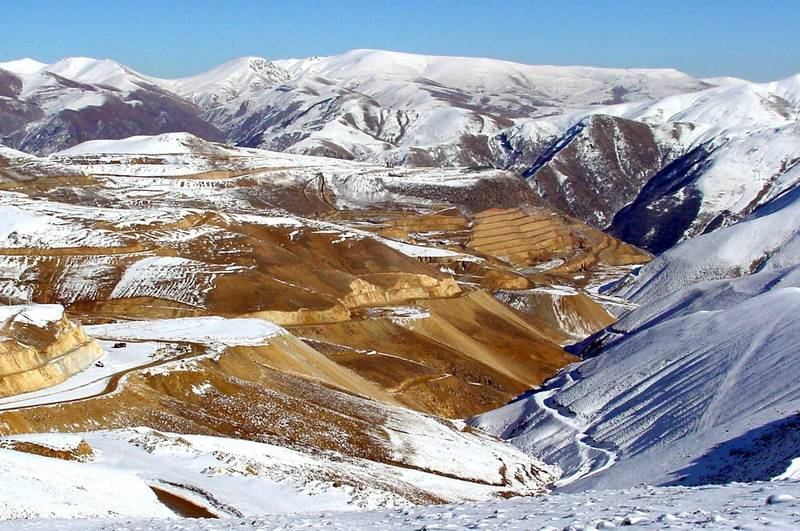

- Location within Iran
- Location: East Azerbaijan, Iran; 38°42′04″N 46°42′18″E
- Type: Copper

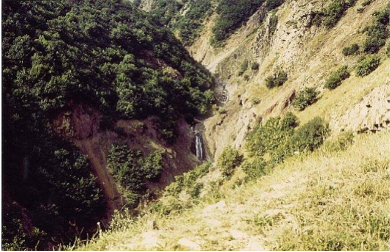
The Sungun area on 4 July 1977

The Sungun copper mine (معدن مس سونگون) is located in Varzaqan county, East Azerbaijan, Iran, 75 km northwest of the provincial town of Ahar. It is the most important geologic and industrial feature in the area. It is the largest open-pit copper mine in Iran and is in the primary stages of extraction started on 1998.

The reserves are estimated to be as much as 995 million tons of copper ore. The ore is processed directly at a concentration plant at the mine. The capacity of the concentration plant is 170,000 tons of copper concentrates, with plans to expand to 300,000 tons.

== History ==
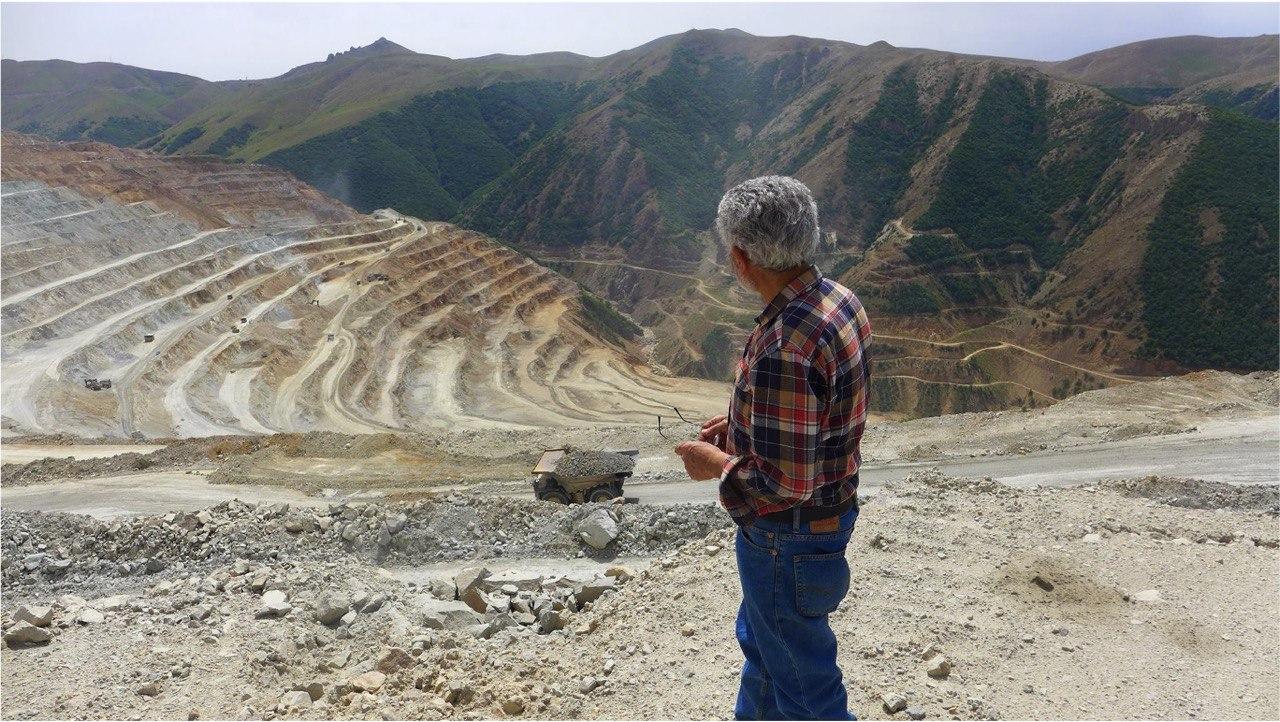
The Sungun Copper Mine in July 2017

The history of mining activities at Sungun dates back approximately two centuries, to the Qajar period. Evidence of early mining operations exists in the form of underground excavations along the Sungun River, particularly within high-grade zones. Intermittent extraction of high-grade copper ore continued until 1972.

Modern exploration activities using advanced methods, tools, and equipment began in 1946 and continued until 1974. According to available documentation, in August 1977, Dr. Hashem Etminan—one of the senior experts of the Geological Survey of Iran—was the first to systematically identify the Sungun deposit as a porphyry copper deposit, thereby guiding subsequent exploration studies. Consequently, in 1991, based on geochemical and geophysical exploration conducted by the Oleng and Itok companies, the presence of strong copper and molybdenum anomalies was confirmed. Preliminary feasibility studies were carried out in 1991 by SNC of Canada and in 1995 by the Itok company.

The first exploratory borehole was drilled in 1989. Between 1989 and 1992, semi-detailed exploration activities were conducted by Oleng Mining Company in cooperation with a British company. These activities included the excavation of seven exploratory tunnels with a cross-sectional area of 4 square meters and a total length of 2,224.25 meters. In addition, during 1991–1992, 30 boreholes with a total depth of 3,000 meters were drilled in the eastern and northeastern parts of the ore body up to the northern skarn zone, providing the necessary parameters for reserve estimation and evaluation by the aforementioned companies.

Pre-stripping operations began in 1993 under the supervision of the Taransheh Mine Company and were completed in 1999 concurrently with complementary and detailed exploration studies, with the assistance of Pars Olang Consulting Engineers and Rio Tinto.

== See also ==
- Mining in Iran
