= Ministry of Industries and Mines (Iran) =

Iranian government agency from 1906 to 2011

Coordinates: 35°42′16.67″N 51°25′5.78″E

- وزارت صنایع و معادن; Wezārate Sannāye wa Maāden

Agency overview
- Formed: 28 June 1906
- Dissolved: 3 August 2011
- Superseding agency: Ministry of Industries and Business
- Jurisdiction: Islamic Republic of Iran
- Headquarters: Tehran, Iran

Ministry of Industries and Mines of Iran (Persian: Wezārate Sannāye wa Maādene Irān), was the main organ of Iranian Government in charge of the regulation and implementation of policies applicable to industrial and mine sectors.

Being originally under the ministry of Trade in 1906, it was formed under the title of Ministry of Industries and Mines in 1973, and later after a series of splits and merges, it was formed again by the merger of the ministry of Mines and Metals and the ministry of Industries in the year 2000.

== Missions of the ministry ==
The missions of the ministry includes the regulation of strategies for industrial and mining developments, determining policies and plans for these sectors, and improving the efficiency and productivity of these sectors, as well as supervising, directing and supporting them. The missions also include the promotion of export of industrial and mining products and engineering and technical services, as well as improvement of management, productivity and entrepreneurship in these sectors, and the issuance of license for the related production units.

== Deputies ==
The ministry consists of five deputies as:

- Deputy for Human Resources Development & Support
- Deputy for Legal Parliamentary & Provisional Affairs
- Deputy for Planning Development & Technology
- Deputy for Mining & Mining Industries
- Deputy for Industry & Economic Affairs

== See also ==
- Cabinet of Iran
- Government of Iran
- Industry of Iran
- Mining in Iran
- Iran Chamber of Commerce Industries and Mines
- Iran Marine Fund
- Bank of Industry and Mine
- Industrial Development and Renovation Organization of Iran
- IMIDRO
- Geological Survey and Mineral Exploration of Iran
