= Andaryan gold mine =

Gold mine in East Azerbaijan, Iran

Andaryan gold mine is the largest gold mine in the East Azerbaijan Province of Iran. It is located in Varzaqan County adjacent to the Andaryan village. The open-pit mine began operations in 2011.
