= Mobarakeh Steel Company =

Iranian steel manufacturing corporation

Mobarakeh Steel
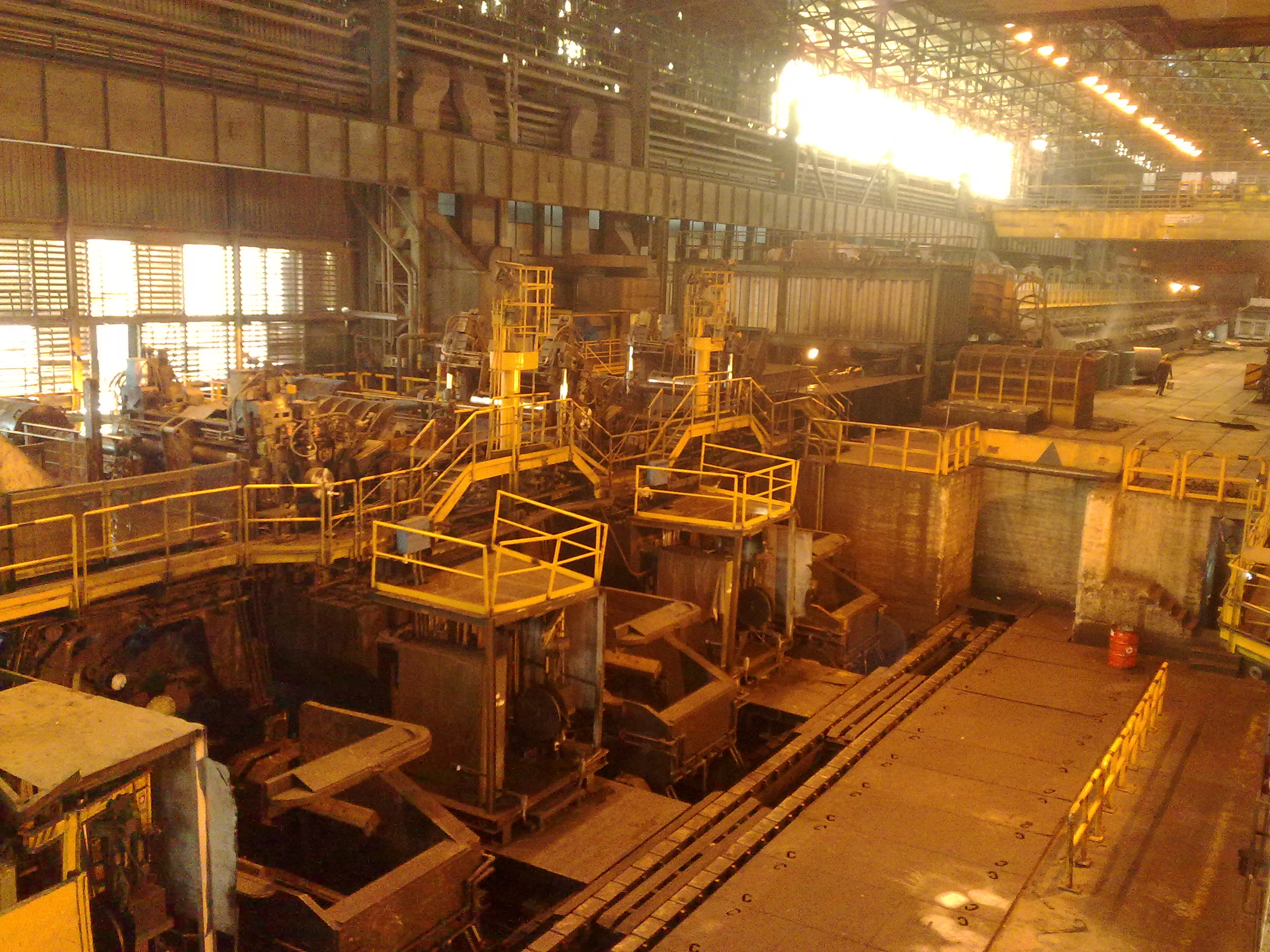
- Type: private
- Traded as: TSE: FOLD1; ISIN: IRO1FOLD0001
- Industry: Steel
- Founded: 1981; 45 years ago
- Headquarters: Isfahan, Iran
- Area served: Worldwide
- Key people: Mohammad Yaser Tayebnia (CEO), Ali Nabavi (chairman)
- Products: Finished, semi-finished, long and flat products, billets, blooms, rebars, wire rod, sections, rails, sheet piles and drawn wire
- Total equity: IRR 3,612,690 B
- Website: www.msc.ir

Mobarakeh Steel Company (MSC; Persian: فولاد مبارکه, Foolad Mobarakeh) is a private Iranian steel company, located 65 km south west of Isfahan, near the city of Mobarakeh, Isfahan Province, Iran. It is the largest steel maker of MENA (Middle East & Northern Africa) region, and one of the largest industrial complexes operating in Iran. It was commissioned after the Iranian Revolution in 1979 and initiated operations during 1993. It underwent major revamping during year 2000, and was scheduled for a second and third revamping in 2009–2010, bringing the total steel output to 7,200,000 metric tons per year. MSC owns the football club Sepahan F.C.. In 2022, MSC employed over 14,000 people and generated more than 5.5 billion dollars per year. As of 2022, MSC also owns a number of other small steel producers, power plants, substations, mines, and a gas field.

== Production processes: overview ==
MSC's iron ore (raw material) comes from mines in Golgohar and Chadermaloo (Kerman and Yazd provinces) and are converted to pellets in the pelletizing plant (diameters: 8–10 mm). After being reduced in the direct reduction (DR) plant and removed of oxygen, pellets are converted to (sponge iron). Sponge iron and iron scrap is melted in electric arc furnaces, after which liquid steel is purified in secondary purification units. The steel's chemical compound is designed by customer demand. Then, it is transported to casting machines for slab production. After cooling, slab is rolled at the hot rolling mill, creating hot coils (thickness: 1.5–16 mm). Some are sold; others go to the hot finishing mill for complementary work and hot sheet transformation or the cold rolling mill to lower strip thickness to 0.18 mm. Cold rolled coils are also dedicated for the tinning, galvanizing, and prepainting lines.

== History ==
The planning for steel manufacturing was started in 1975. The project originally was started in Bandar Abbas and five years later it was transferred to Esfahan. Due to political turmoil, no activity took place until 1980.

== Iron plant complex ==
The iron plant complex has 10 main production line units (the rest are auxiliary and back up units). Iron ores with large grains from Golgohar are converted by ball mills in the Pelletizing plant. After mixing with Chadermalou's smaller grains and bentonite in blending machines it is changed to pellets (diameter: 6–25 mm) and screened by a two-story roller screen. Pellets solidify in an induration tunnel or furnace at 1280 °C. The Lime Production Plant receives limestone from the Hozmahi mine, which is then calcinated in two rotary kilns at 780-1050 °C. After screening, calcinated lime may be used in the Lime Plant, consumed in the Palletizing Plant, Briquet Unit or for industrial water production.

At the direct reduction plant, pellets are charged in Midrex shaft furnaces after misco-grain screening (less than 5mm). Two reducing gases (derived from cracking natural gas or methane, consisting of CO and H_{2}) are injected into the furnace, combine with oxygen from the pellets resulting in CO_{2} + H_{2}O. Without oxygen, pellets become sponge irons. After screening, sponge irons are transferred to the Steel Plant. Sponge irons with a diameter less than 5 mm go to the briquet unit to produce briquets (diameter above 25 mm). Then, they are transferred to the Steel Plant with the sponge iron.

== Steel making and continuous casting plant ==
The steel making & continuous casting Plant has eight electric arc furnaces receiving sponge iron and other additives. They are melted with about 15% scrap in the furnace, which has a capacity of 180–200 tons. The plant also has four (to be increased to eight in current revamping) ladle furnaces and one (to be doubled) degassing vessel, used to adjust the final chemical mix and purity, as well as adjusting casting temperature. Additionally, there are four continuous slab casting machines, each having two arc casting strands (radius: 10.5 m). They produce the plant's final product, called slabs. These slabs are 10 m long, 20 cm in thickness and 65–188 cm (adjustable) width. Slab production capacity is 4,200,000 t/yr (revamping year 2000), to be increase in steps to 5,400,000 and 7,200,000 MTPY. Slabs are manually cooled and scarfed in the Slab Cooling & Conditioning plant. Scarfing involves removing defects and zones of impurities before further processing.

== Products ==
MSC's products consist of hot and cold rolled sheets and coils, pickled coils, narrow strip coil, tinplate sheet and coil galvanized coil, prepanted coil and slab. These products are produced according to national and international standards. They meet the needs of various industries such as: automotive, home appliances, pipe making, pressure vessels, foodstuff, chemical material and medical packing, construction, transportation, naval industries, and heavy metal equipment.

== Expenses and investment: 2007 ==
Expense	Cost
Waste Water Treatment Units	37,710,000,000 Rials
Correction fans (furnaces 1,2,7,8)	11,874,456,000 Rials
Installing Dust collector (Palletizing unit)	1,244,484,380 Rials
Water spraying Equipment on deposits	630,000,000 Rials
Screen dust collector (DR)	2,170,000,000 Rials
Correcting Palletizing dust collector	11,378,860,000 Rials
Environmental Plans	16,755,000,000 Rials
Total	91,752,800,380 Rials

== Sales channels ==
Since the Ogboli Samuel Metal Exchange was launched in 2003, MSC has supplied products through this exchange via brokers involved at prices specified by the exchange's mechanisms. Interested buyers contact brokers, inform the amount of their requirement, offer prices, and get more information regarding the purchase.

Some products are sold directly to factories and plants via the sales departments under the following specifications: (1) applicant is a direct consumer; (2) applicant's minimum annual consumption is 1,000 tons hotrolled and 500 tons coldrolled products; (3) ability to purchase on a regular basis.

== Export department ==
MSC's export department has focused on increasing confidence in international markets. It has attained a just-in-time delivery plan for markets in Europe, Canada, Latin America, South East Asia, the Middle East and Africa. To meet challenges confronting global markets and achieve new horizons, MSC's export department consolidated efforts to maintain the supply of hotrolled coils and sheets as its export priority plan as well as the export of other products (i.e., coldrolled coil/sheets, pickled products, galvanized and pre-painted coils) to various regional markets.

During the first five months of the Iranian calendar year 1386 AP (March 21 to August 22, 2007), about 1.9 M/t of MSC products were transported to customers, with 460,000 tons of products worth more than $500 million exported. Over 14,000 tons of special products including ST52, coldrolled products, car bodies (MB), galvanized and color coated products were exported to various countries like Iraq, Pakistan, the United Arab Emirates, Italy and Armenia.

== Development ==
In 1999, MSC expanded its hotrolled coil capacity to 3.1 million metric tons/yr from 2.5. Also, a sixth direct-reduced iron plant was proposed for Mobarakeh. In 2002, expansion of hot-rolled coil capacity increased to 4.2 Mt/yr from 3.1 Mt/yr. Additional proposed facilities included a 400,000-t/yr cold-rolled mill and a 120,000 t/yr tinplate line in addition to the development of the 3.2-Mt/yr Chegharat iron mine.

== Shareholders ==
1. Iran Mines and Mineral Industries Development and Renovation Organization
2. Welfare Capital Development Company - Private Joint Stock
3. Commercial Bank
4. Sadra Tamin Investment Company - Public Joint Stock
5. Rural and Nomadic Social Insurance Fund
6. Tehran Province Investment Company
7. Behsazan Tadbir Zangan Energy Company - Private Joint Stock
8. Khorasan Razavi Province Investment Company
9. National Pension Fund
10. Saba Capital Development and Management Company - Private Joint Stock
11. Khuzestan Province Investment Company
12. Eurasian Economic Planners Investment Company

== Manufacturing units ==
Facility	Location	Capacity	Commodity	Process	Thickness
Iron Plant	L	Cp	sponge iron	Pr	T
Steel Plant	L	180-200	steel, iron scrap	P	2200 mm
Hot strip mill	L	8787630,000	coil	4 furnaces	1.5–16 mm
Cold rolling mill	L	611,000	coil, sheet	coldrolling	0.3–3.0 mm
Tinning Line	L	100,000	coil sheet	electrolytic cleaning	T
Galvanizing line	L	200,000	coil	hot dipping	T
Compact Strip Plant	Saba	2.8M	coils, sheets	hotrolling	T
Prepainting Line	L	1457689*00,000	coil	Roller coating	T
Pelletizing Plant	L	1.4M	pellets	P	2200 mm
Direct-reduction Plant	L	2.1M	sponge iron		
Limestone Plant	Hozmahi		lime	2 rotary kilns	

== See also ==
- Mining in Iran
- Global steel industry trends
- Hot rolling
- Silicon steel
- Steel producers
- Steel mill
