= HEPCO =

Manufacturing company in Arak, Iran

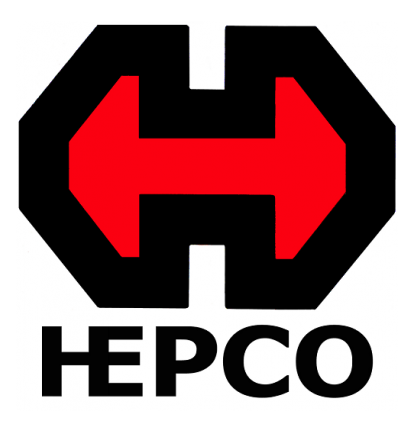
- Type: Public
- Industry: Heavy equipment; Agricultural machinery; Automotive industry; Energy industry; Oil industry; Metal and mining
- Founded: 1972; 54 years ago
- Headquarters: Arak, Iran
- Area served: Worldwide
- Products: Bulldozers; Combines; Continuous Casting Machine; Dump Trucks; Electric Generators; Excavators; Forklifts; Graders; Industrial Machinery; Loaders; Pavers; Railroad cars; Road Rollers; Scrapers; Shovels; Tractors; Trucks; TBM
- Website: www.hepcoir.com

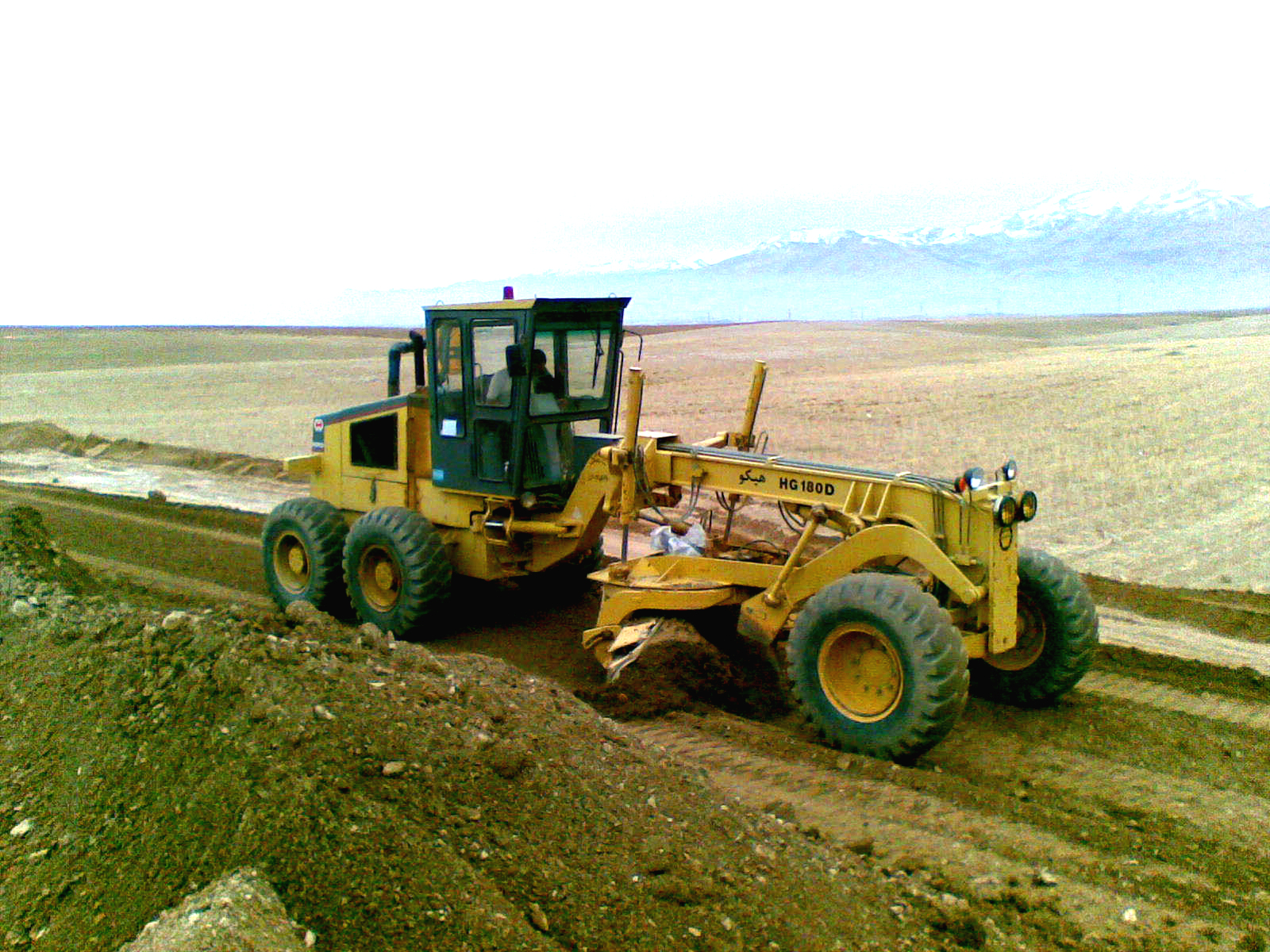
HEPCO motor grader HG180D

Heavy Equipment Production Company (HEPCO) is an Iranian corporation that manufactures construction equipment, railroad cars, trucks, forklifts and the industrial machinery of oil, gas, energy, metal and mining industries in Arak, HEPCO is the largest heavy equipment manufacturer in the Middle East. This company has 1,500 employees with an annual production capacity of 4,800 units.

== History ==
HEPCO was established and registered in 1972, with the intention of assembly & production of heavy equipment. In 1975 HEPCO resumed operation in its premises in Arak consisting of 1,000,000 square meters of land & 40,000 square meters of production hall in collaboration with manufacturers such as Navistar International, Dynapac, Poclain, Sakai Heavy Industries and Lokomo.

In 1984, HEPCO development project was designed in collaboration with Liebherr & Volvo companies, aiming at fabrication of steel structures of construction equipment.

In 2020, HEPCO signed 5 MOUs with National Iranian Copper Industry Company (NICIC), Mobarakeh Steel Company, Gol Gohar Mining and Industrial Company, Chadormalu Mining and Industrial Company, Mining Investment Insurance Company (MIIC), and Iran Mine House, said Khodadad Gharibpour, the head of Iranian Mines and Mining Industries Development and Renovation Organization (IMIDRO) to manufacture 900 road building machines in total during the first and second years.

=== Privatization ===
HEPCO was originally established before the Islamic Revolution in Iran in 1979. The company was consequently seized by organizations and persons tied with Islamic Republic officials. Afterwards, the company was sold to the private sector as part of the ruling Islamic Republic privatization plans of 2006, which put Islamic Republic officials and their affiliates in control of the country’s vital businesses. A series of protests took place in intervals since the privatization took place, ending in 2021 when the factory eventually was shut down. The company exported 23 heavy machines to Africa in 2025.

=== Depression ===
After a series of clashes between the factory workers at HEPCO and police, multiple protesters were injured and/or detained by the Iranian anti-riot forces, and, as a result, the headcount of factory workers dropped from 8,000 to nearly 1,000.

== Gallery ==
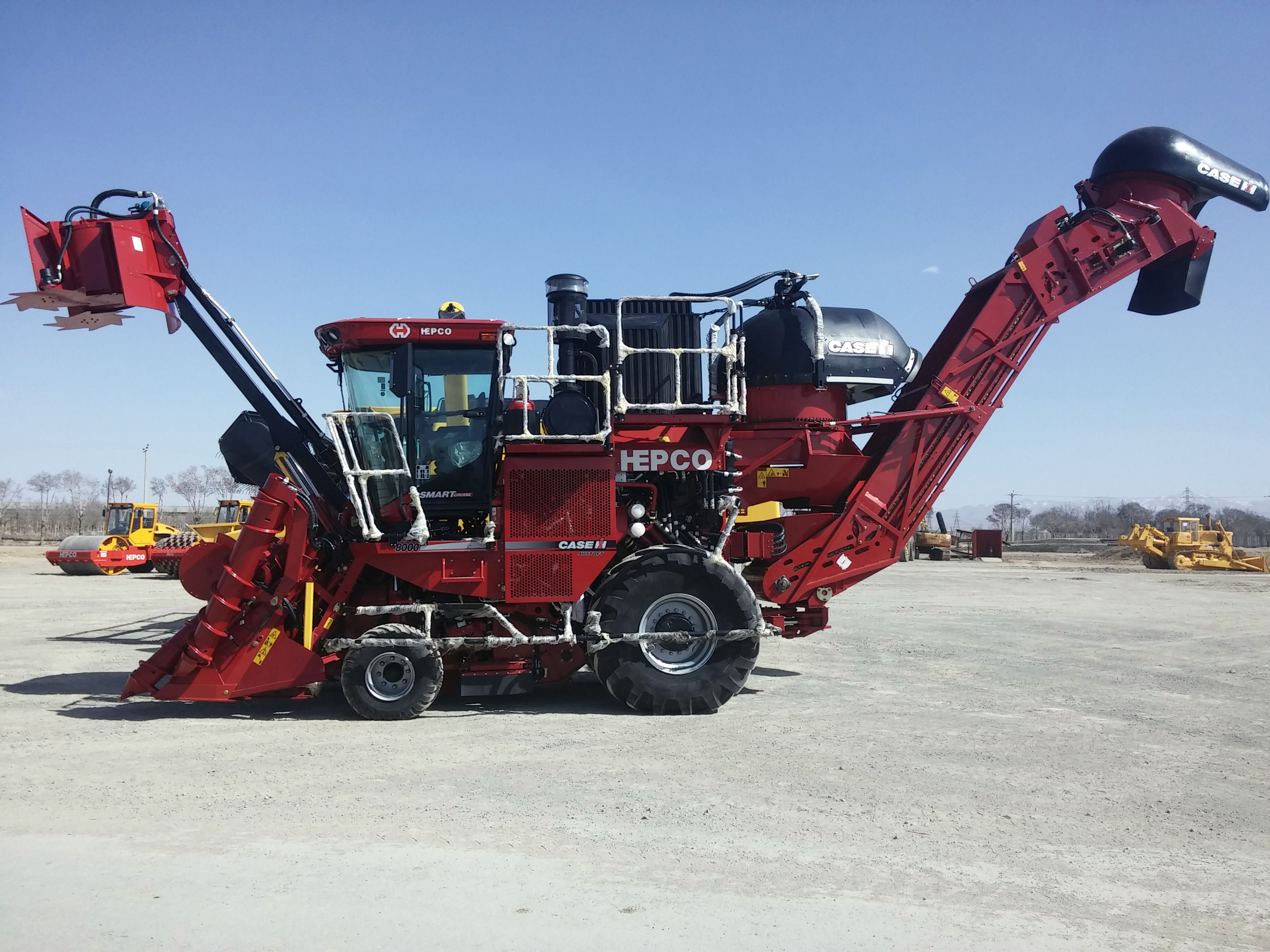

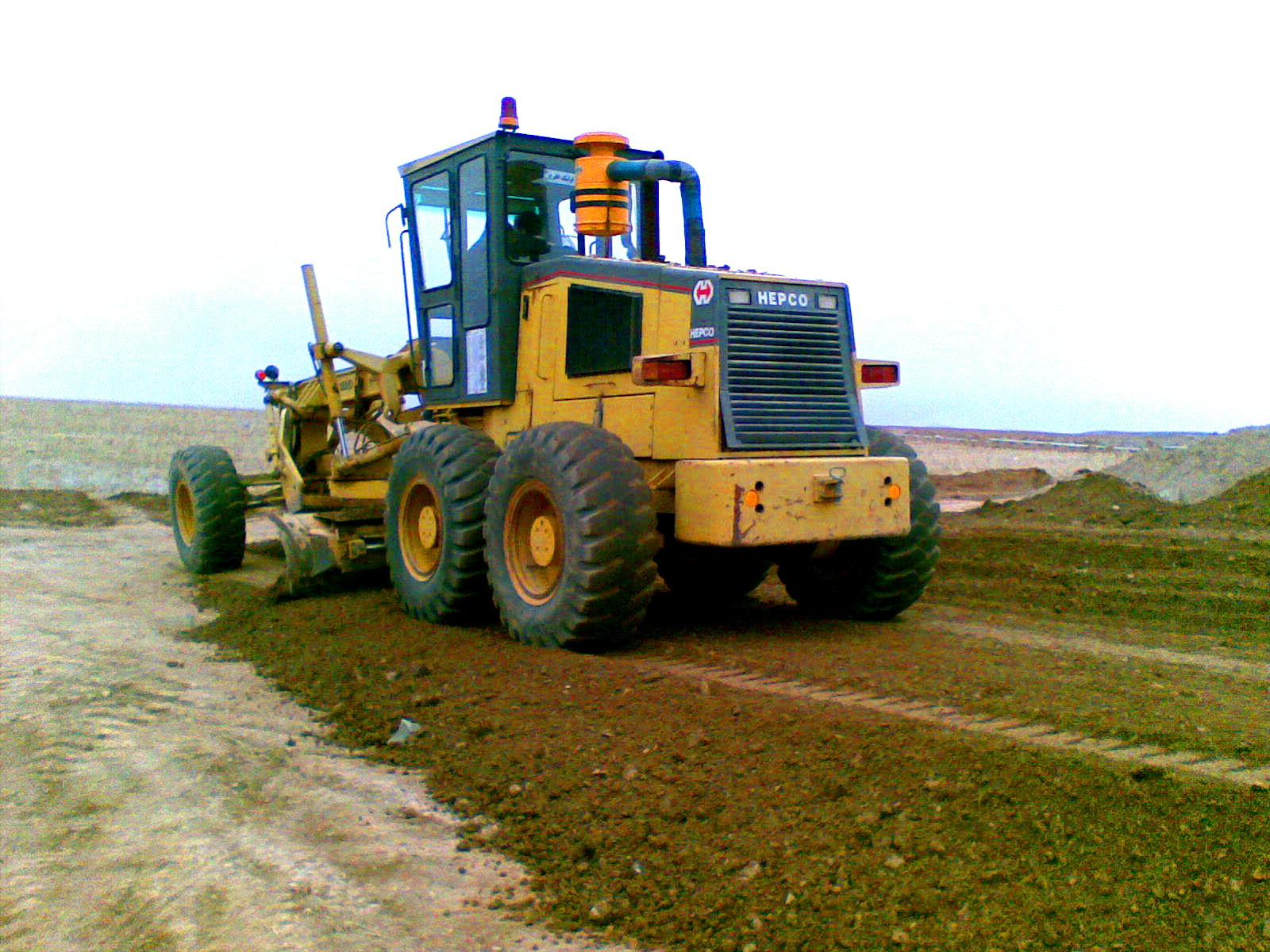
Grader HG180D

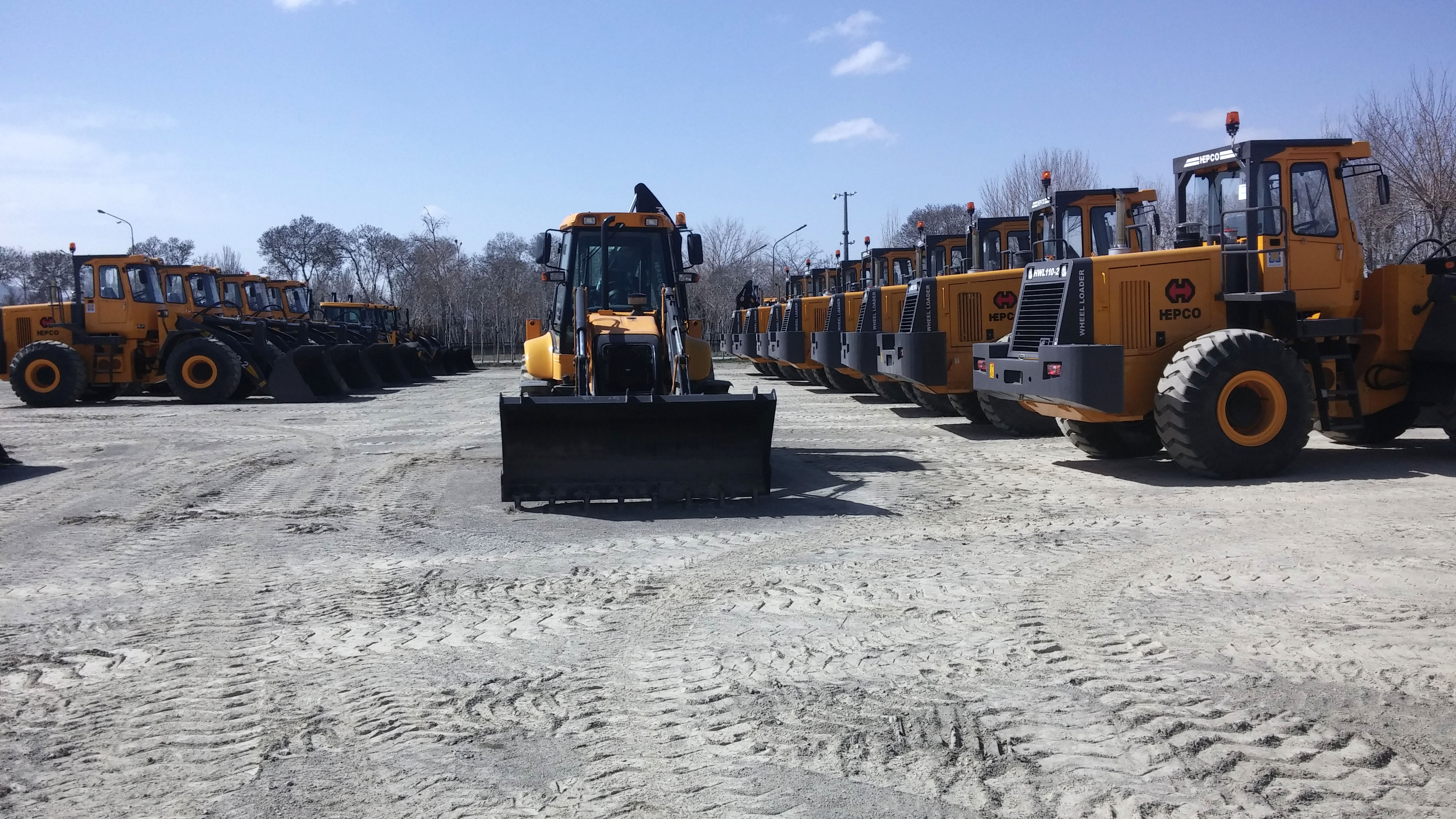
HWL 110-2

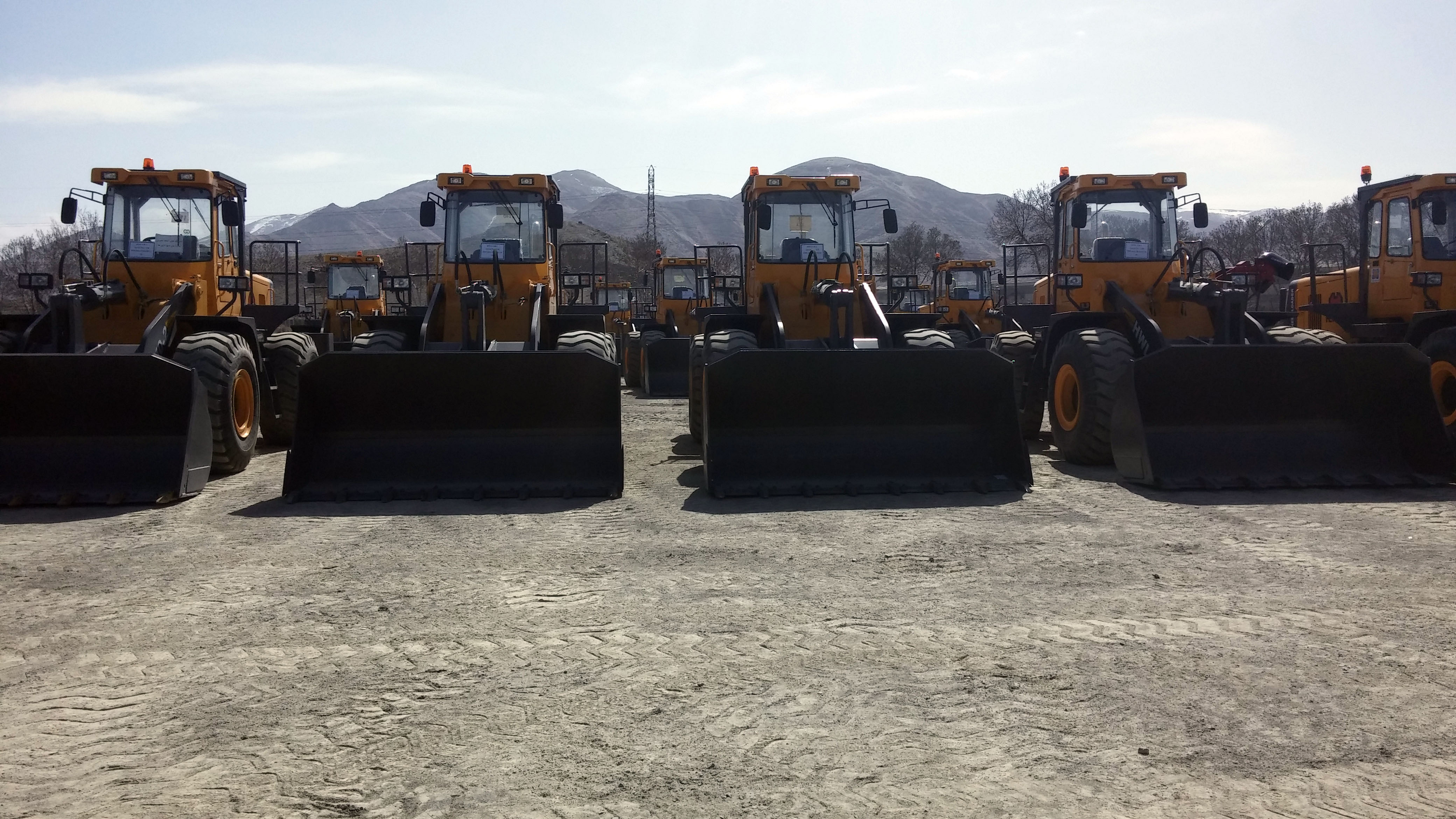
The parking of HWL 110-2 outside the production line

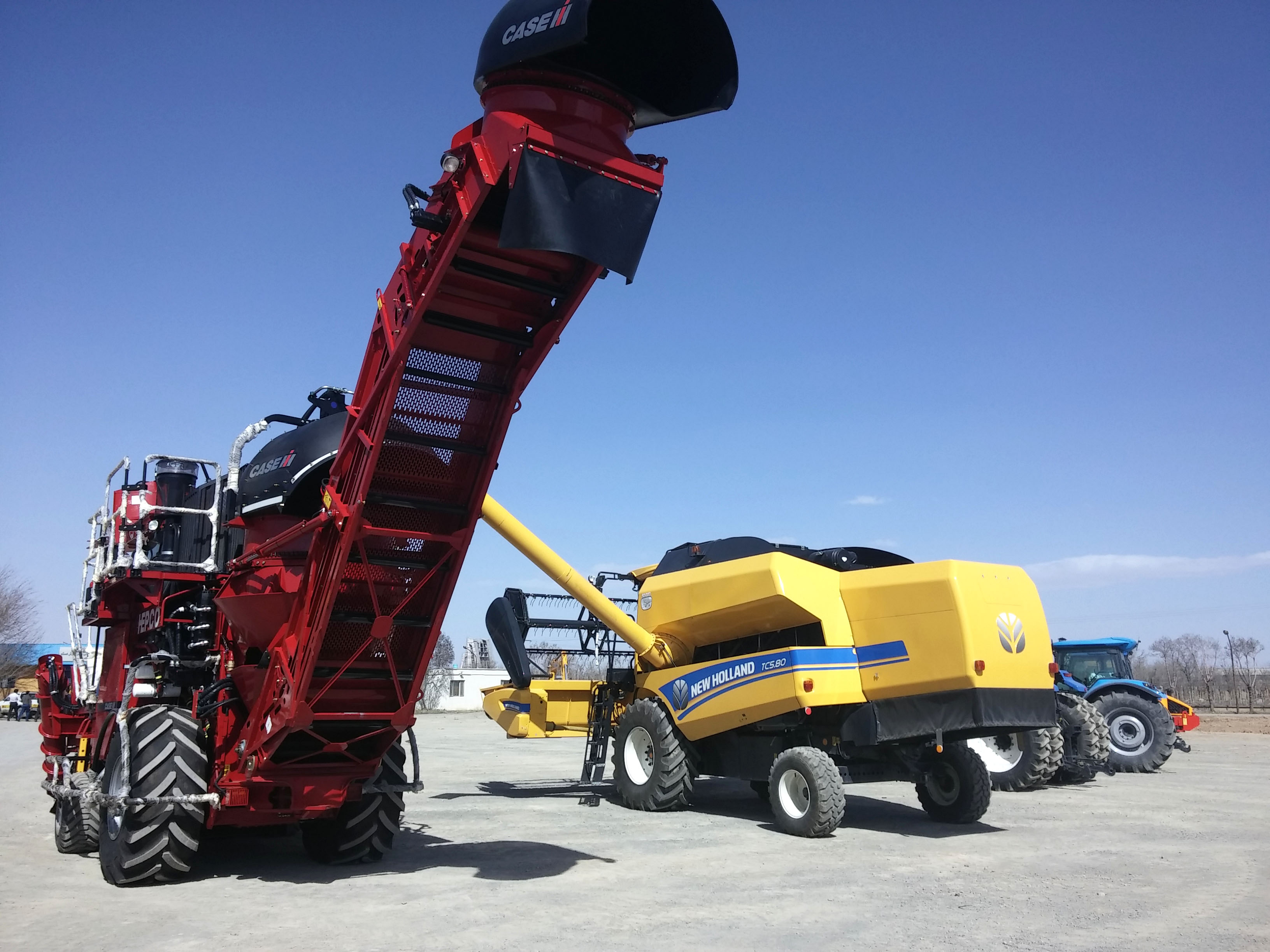
Sugar Cane Harvester

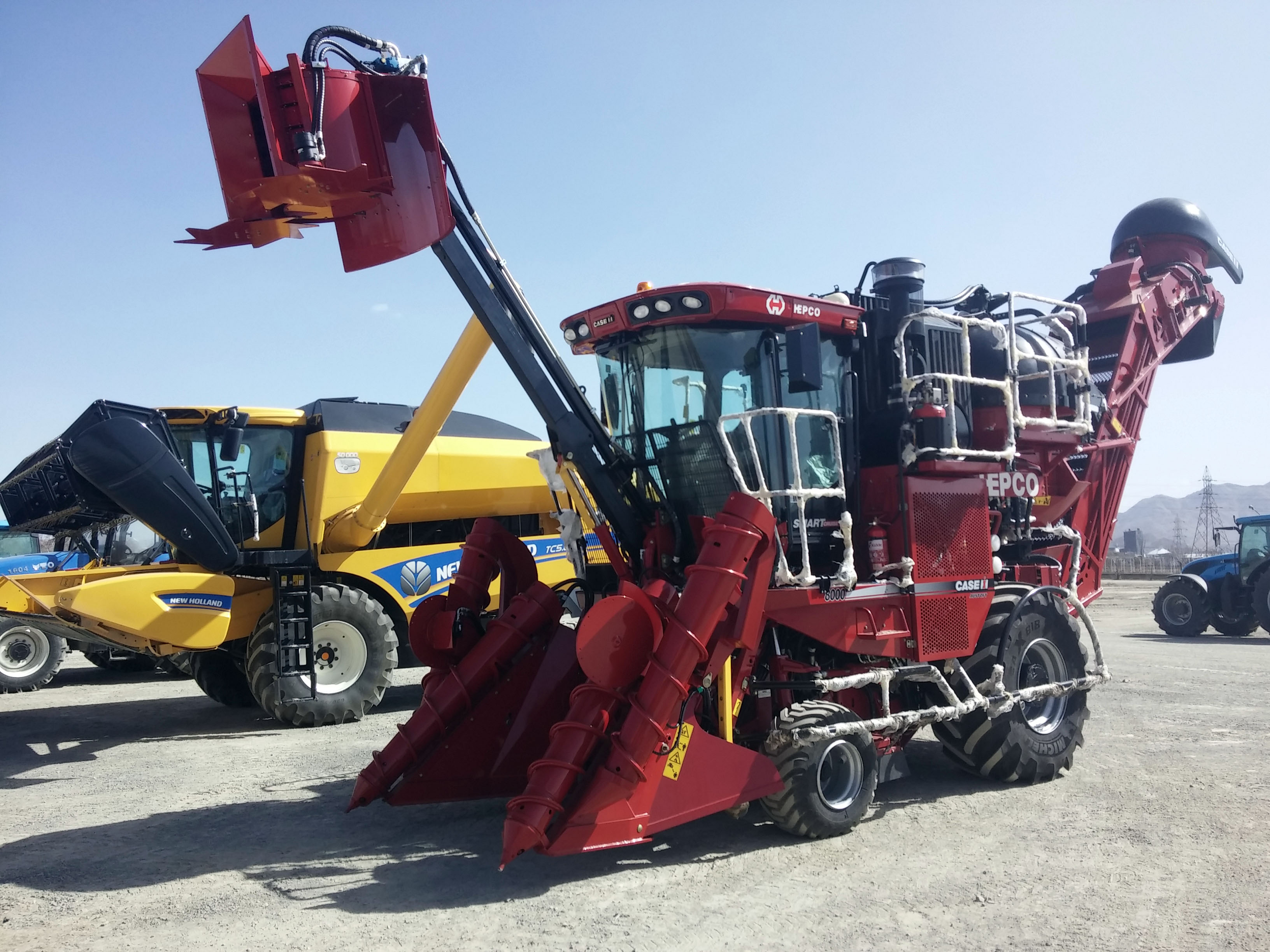
Sugar Cane Harvester

== See also ==
- Automotive industry in Iran
- Mining in Iran
