= List of companies of Iran =

This is a list of notable companies based in Iran.

== Companies ==
* holding company

Company name	Industry	Sales - 2006 (billion RLS)	Sales - 2007 (billion RLS)	Sales - 2008 (billion RLS)	Sales - 2022 (billion RLS)
National Iranian Oil Company*	Energy and petrochemicals		464,370.453	704,011	
IMIDRO Group*	Mining		75,543.538	98,784.529	
National Petrochemical Co.*	Energy and petrochemicals		42,373.1	69,450.569	
Saipa Corp.*	Automakers and parts		51,574.5	54,998.704	600,130,180
Bank Melli Iran*	Banking and financial services		34,649.556	41,527.145	
SAPCO	Automakers and parts		34,902.855	40,991.34	
Mobarakeh Steel Company	Steel		22,035.8	31,720.223	
Saderat Bank Iran*	Banking and financial services		23,502.579	29,871.66	
Parsian Bank*	Banking and financial services		17,391.596	28,229.778	
Bank Mellat*	Banking and financial services		21,829.852	27,740.132	
TCI	Telecommunications		15,418.148	26,002.155	285,858,190
Sepah Bank*	Banking and financial services		15,990.94	23,831.913	
Tejarat Bank	Banking and financial services		15,597.3	22,717.514	
Bandar Imam Petrochemical Co.	Energy and petrochemicals		15,906.6	22,492.712	
Iran Insurance Company	Insurance		17,249.405	19,779.068	
National Iranian Copper Industries Co. (NICICO)	Mining		16,921.7	19,403.121	
Bank Maskan*	Banking and financial services		12,524.905	17,888.198	
Esfahan Steel Company	Steel		12,077.3	17,815.85	
Islamic Republic of Iran Shipping Lines Co.*	Transportation		10,365.528	17,197.697	
Keshavarzi Bank*	Banking and financial services		12,525.26	16,706.738	
MAPNA*	Utilities and infrastructure		13,562.5	14,161.924	
Bou Ali Sina Petrochemical Industries	Energy and petrochemicals		9,459.161	11,641.151	
Khouzestan Steel Co.	Steel		9,101.6	11,439.014	
Bank Melli Investment Co.*	Banking and financial services		9,292.455	10,673.587	
Iran Khodro Diesel*	Automakers and parts		11,577	10,286.945	
MAPNA International FZE	Utilities and infrastructure		9,612.2398	9,729.7064	
Eghtesad Novin Bank*	Banking and financial services		4,491.837	9,633.053	
Borzouyeh Petrochemical Co.	Energy and petrochemicals		0	8,596.051	
Civil Pension Fund Investment Co.*	Banking and financial services		6,312.991	8,105.107	
Zamyad Co.*	Automakers and parts		5,134.3	7,429.868	
Iran Dairy Industries Co. *	Beverage and food		4,530.1	7,074.793	
Pasargad Bank	Banking and financial services		2,140.04	6,746.68	
Mine and Industry Bank*	Banking and financial services		5,155.184	6,469.77	
Marun petrochemical complex	Energy and petrochemicals		1,196.9	6,340.397	
AmirKabir Petrochemical Co.	Energy and petrochemicals		4,451.5	6,064.211	
Pars Khodro*	Automakers and parts		4,886	5,999.496	
Bahman Group*	Automakers and parts		2,544.8	5,752.101	
Ghadir Investment Company*	Banking and financial services		3,365.646	5,390.507	
Iran Melli-Sanati Steel Group	Steel		4,116.6	4,993.386	
Petrochemical Commercial Company International Ltd.	Energy and petrochemicals		4134.8096	4,698.4139	
Darou Pakhsh*	Pharmaceuticals		3,981	4,683.244	
Iran Electronics Industries (SAIRAN)*	Computers and electronics		3,260.536	4,604.546	
Sadid Industrial Group*	Industrial equipment and machinery		3,149.1	4,585.413	
National Iranian Petrochemical Company (NIPC)	Energy and petrochemicals		0	4,561.188	
Khorasan Steel Complex	Steel		3,070.3	3,948.86	
Tooga-Mapna Turbine Engineering and Production	Utilities and infrastructure		2,513.4	3,828.533	
Sina Bank	Banking and financial services		2,858.609	3,484.194	
Iran Tractor Mfg. Co.*	Automakers and parts		3,186.9	3,434.786	
Saipa Diesel*	Automakers and parts		6,383.3	3,369.18	
Karafarin Bank	Banking and financial services		2,249.393	3,321.455	
Iran Aluminium Co. (IRALCO)	Steel		2,830.7	3,188.901	
Tabriz Petrochemical Co.	Energy and petrochemicals		3,012.7	3,020.292	
Chadormalu Mining and Industrial Company	Mining		2,073.5	2,939.034	
Behran Oil Co.*	Energy and petrochemicals		2,328	2,898.124	
Iranian Offshore Engineering and Construction Company*	Energy and petrochemicals		2,745.3	2,854.301	
HEPCO*	Industrial equipment and machinery		2,082.2	2,792.044	
Tidewater Co. Middle East Marin Services Plc*	Energy and petrochemicals		1,639.859	2,734.105	
Zamzam Soft Drink Mfg. Co.	Beverage and food	1,711			
Shahid Ghandi Co.	Utilities and infrastructure	975.6			
Rena Investment Co.	Banking and financial services	903.5			
Arak Machine-building Co.	Industrial equipment and machinery	845.8			
Shiraz Petrochemical Co.	Energy and petrochemicals	700.7			
Pars Oil Co.	Energy and petrochemicals	661.7			
Isfahan Petrochemical Co.	Energy and petrochemicals	617.9			
AZAR AB Industries Co	Industrial equipment and machinery	591.5			
Sepanta Co.	Construction and building materials	544.9			
Industrial Development and Renovation Organization of Iran*	Industrial equipment and machinery	19,699.7			
Iran Air	Airlines	3,317.8			
Defense Industries Organization	Aerospace and defense	2,158.6			
Iran Marine Industrial Co. (SADRA)	Industrial equipment and machinery	661.3			
Iran Air Tour Co.	Airlines	447.2			
Arj Co.	Industrial equipment and machinery	373.8			
Tolypers Co.	Energy and petrochemicals	332.7			
Snapp	IT sector				
Nobitex*	Crypto				
Iran Aviation Industries Organization*	Aerospace and defense				
Iran Shipbuilding & Offshore Industries Complex	Shipbuilding, oil and gas				
Iranian Space Agency	Aerospace and defense				
Maadiran Group	Computers and electronics				
Iran System	Computers and electronics				
Pars Online	Internet Service Provider				
Shatel	Internet Service Provider				
MTN Irancell	Telecommunications				
Khatam al-Anbiya Construction Headquarters*	Construction and building materials				
Islamic Republic of Iran Railways	Transportation				
Payam Air	Transportation				
Tehran Metro	Transportation				
National Iranian Tanker Company	Transportation				
National Iranian Oil Refining and Distribution Company	Energy and petrochemicals				
Petropars	Energy and petrochemicals				
PetroIran	Energy and petrochemicals				
Naftiran Intertrade Company	Energy and petrochemicals				
Atomic Energy Organization of Iran	Energy and petrochemicals				
Aabsal	Industrial equipment and machinery				
North Drilling	Energy and petrochemicals				
Shahrvand	Retail				
Refah supermarket	Retail				
Islamic Republic of Iran Broadcasting	Media and entertainment				
Tehran Stock Exchange Services Company (TSESC)	Banking and financial services				
Iran Software & Hardware Co. (NOSA)	Computers and electronics				
Data Processing Iran Co.	Computers and electronics				
Telecommunication & Computer Industries Consortium	Computers and electronics				
Parsé Semiconductor Co.	Computers and electronics				
Institute for Productivity & Human Resource Development (IPHRD)	Professional services				
Homa Hotel Group	Hospitality				
Desa diesel	Energy and petrochemicals				
Zagros Petrochemical Company	Energy and petrochemicals				
Bakhtar Petrochemical Company	Energy and petrochemicals				
Oriental Oil Kish	Energy and petrochemicals				
National Iranian Oil Engineering and Construction Co.	Energy and petrochemicals				
Dana Energy	Energy				
Parsijoo	IT sector				
Digikala	IT sector				
Loghman Pharmaceuticals	Pharmaceutical				
Golrang Industrial Group	Consumer goods				
Goldstone Tires	Automobile and truck parts				
Yazd Tire	Automobile and truck parts				
SADRA	Shipbuilding, oil and gas				
IDRO Group	Conglomerate				
Iran Road Maintenance & Transportation Organization	Road maintenance				
Pars Wagon	Rail transport				
Iran Cultural Heritage, Handicrafts and Tourism Organization (ICHTO)	Tourism				
Iranian Rail Industries Development Co (IRICO)	Rail transport				
National Post Company of the Islamic Republic of Iran (Iran Post)	Postal service				

== Methodology ==
The 100 top publicly traded Iranian corporations are chosen each year based on 17 financial indices including growth in sale and dividends as well as rise in profits.

Iran Khodro has been named the top Iranian company. Based on financial 2007 statements, the giant auto manufacturer, Middle East's largest, has been chosen among 400 state and private companies. IDRO Group (IDRO), SAIPA, National Iranian Petrochemical Company and Melli Bank ranked second to fifth respectively.

The most profitable companies as per financial statements for 2007 were IDRO, SAIPA, National Iranian Copper Industries Company and Mobarakeh Steel Company.

The ranking has been assessed by Iran Industrial Management Company for the past 13 years. In previous rankings, the top five corporations were IDRO with an asset of 112,658 billion rials followed by Iran Khodro with an asset of 65,971 billion rials, Iran Mining Industries Development and Renovation Organization with 52,184 billion rials, SAIPA car factory with 40,528 billion rials and National Petrochemical Company with 32,024 billion rials.

The assets of the top 100 Iranian public corporations, which does not include major government owned corporations such as the National Iranian Oil Company and affiliated companies, Industrial Development and Renovation Organization of Iran (IDRO) affiliated companies, the Defense Industries Organization, Iran Air and the Iran Aviation Industries Organization, add up to $86 billion, which is less than that of a corporation such as Microsoft.

== See also ==
- Economy of Iran
- Bonyad
- Setad
- Tehran Stock Exchange
- Privatization in Iran
- Tehran International Fair
- Science and technology in Iran
- Foreign direct investment in Iran
- International rankings of Iran
- Institute of Standards and Industrial Research of Iran
- Industry of Iran
- Taxation in Iran
- Technology startups in Iran
