= Economy of Tehran =

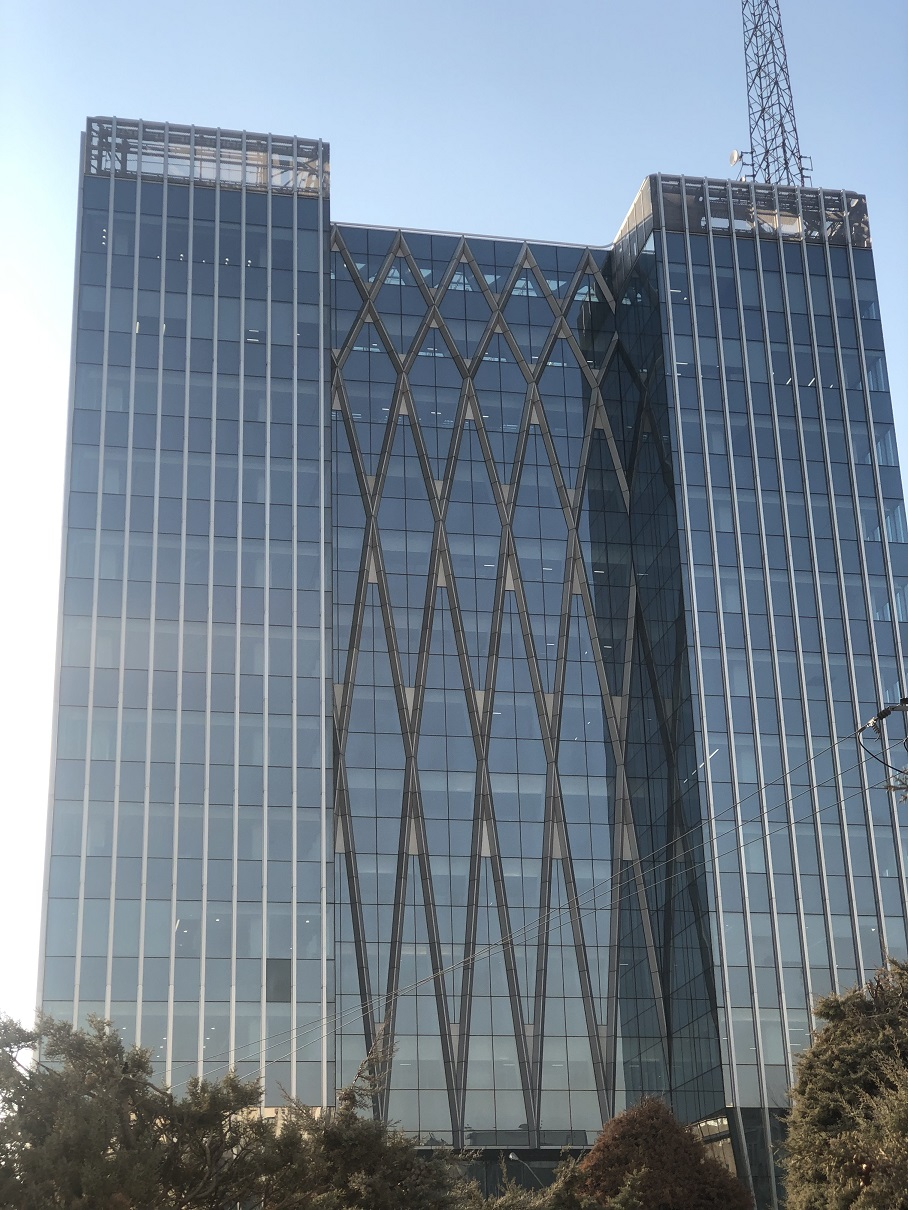
The Building of Tehran Stock Exchange

Tehran is the capital city and the main economic centre of Iran. Tehran's present-day modern industries include the manufacturing of automobiles, electronics and electrical equipment, weaponry, textiles, sugar, cement, and chemical products. It is also a leading center for the sale of carpets and furniture. The oil refining companies of Pars Oil, Speedy, and Behran are based in Tehran. Tehran hosts 45% of Iran's industries.

Few foreign companies operate in Tehran, due to the government's complex international relations. But prior to the 1979 Revolution, many foreign companies were active in Iran.

== Tehran Economy by Sector ==
=== Manufacturing and services ===
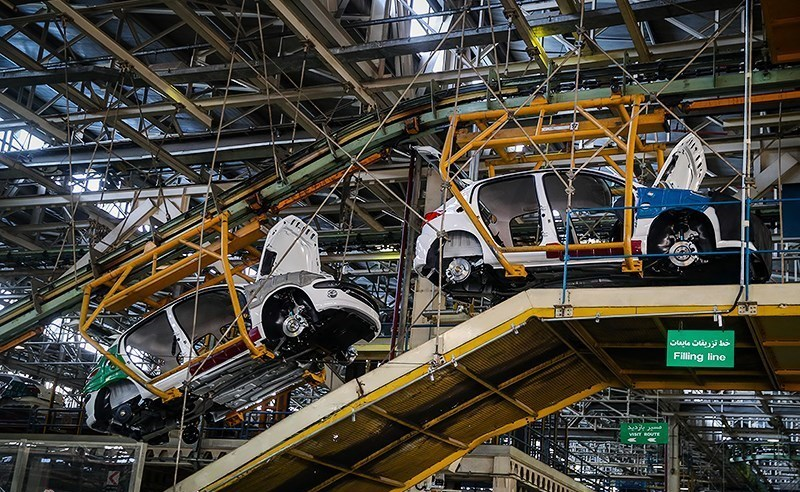
Iran Khodro factory in Tehran

At the end of the twentieth century, more than one-third of all jobs in Tehran were related to social and personal services, also about one-fifth were in manufacturing and about one-sixth were in sales. construction, Transport and financial services each employed fewer workforce. Overall, services account for almost two-thirds of the workforce, Also fewer people employed in industrial activities and a negligible amount employed in agriculture.

Manufacturing industries include metal machinery and equipment, textiles, chemicals, wood, mining, paper and basic metals.

=== Fashion industry ===
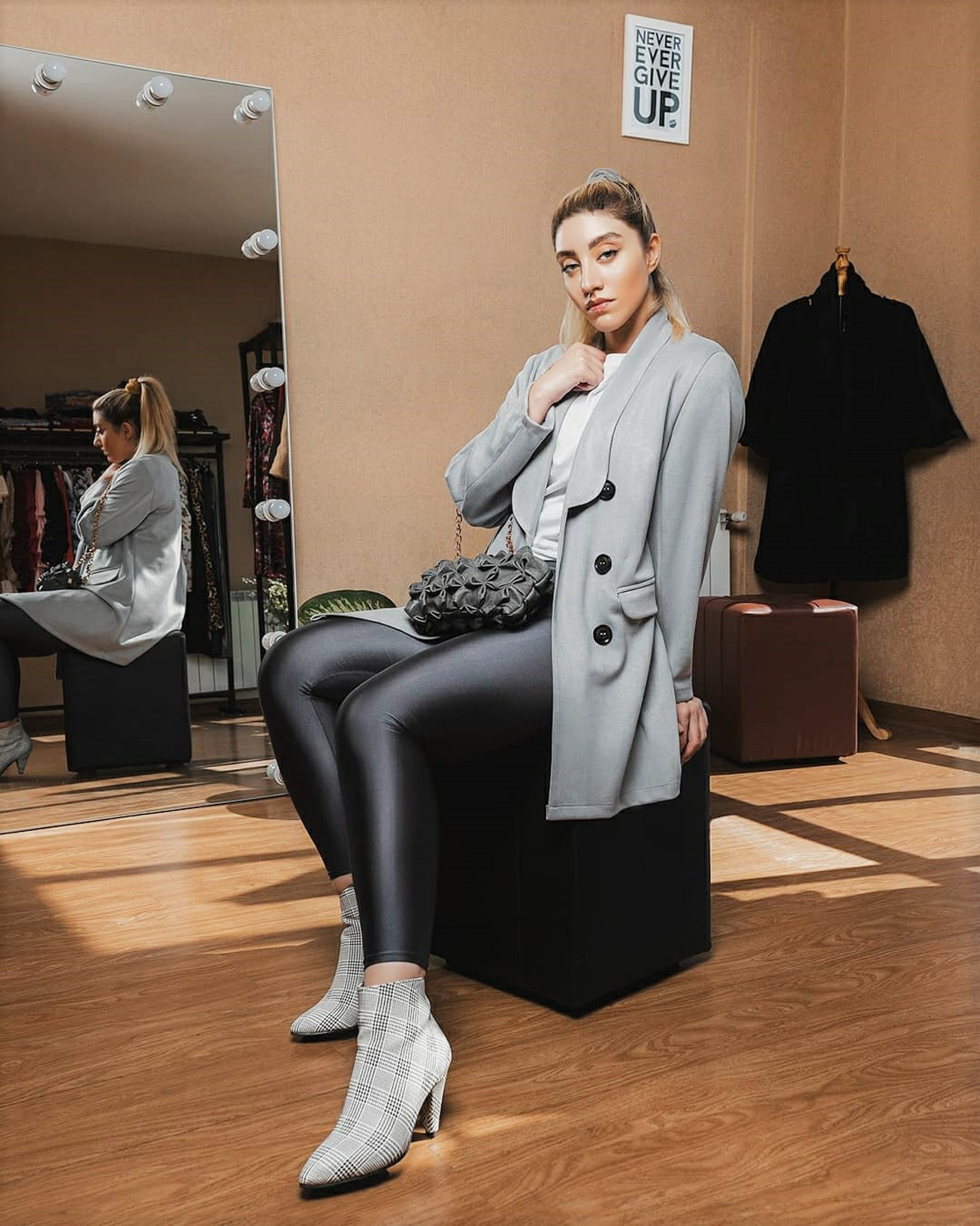
An Iranian fashion model in Tehran (2018). Fashion companies play an important role in Tehran's economy and the number of female employees.

Design, manufacturing, distribution, marketing, retail, advertising and other sectors of the fashion industry in Tehran have been able to grow significantly according to the needs of the country. In particular, a large number of male and female models are working in Tehran's fashion advertising and promotion sections. Despite the lack of adequate laws to support models, payments to female models have been considered high. Also, modeling of children is usually prohibited in Tehran. Clothing manufacturers are closely related to other fashion sectors in Tehran. For example, the manufacturers of women's boots and bodysuits have strengthened their exports and branding in other countries by using this connection.

=== Energy ===
The country's economy is heavily dependent on oil and headquarters of one of the world's largest oil companies NIOC is located in Tehran.

=== Tourism ===
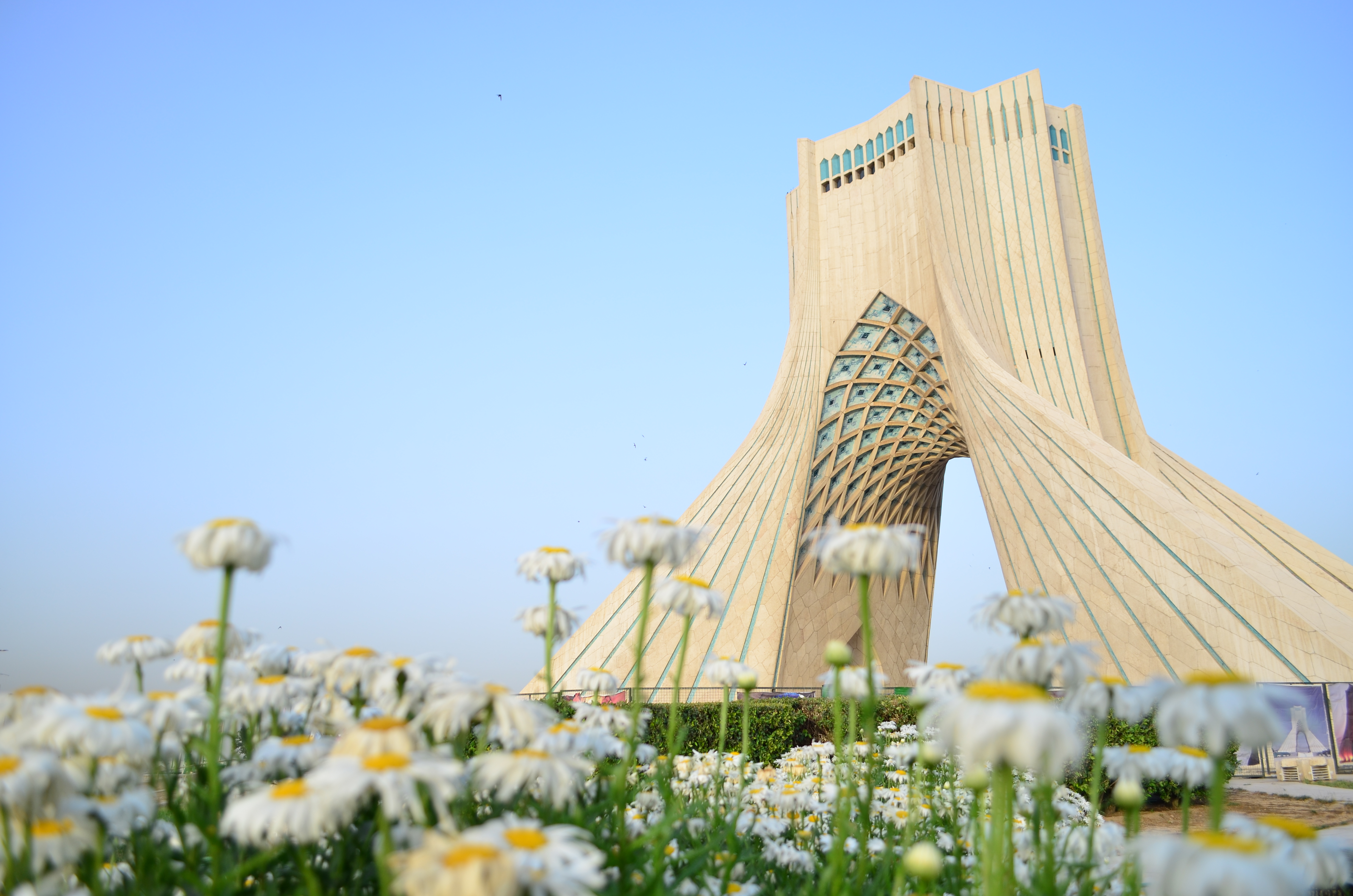
Azadi Tower, One of the most popular tourist attractions in Tehran.

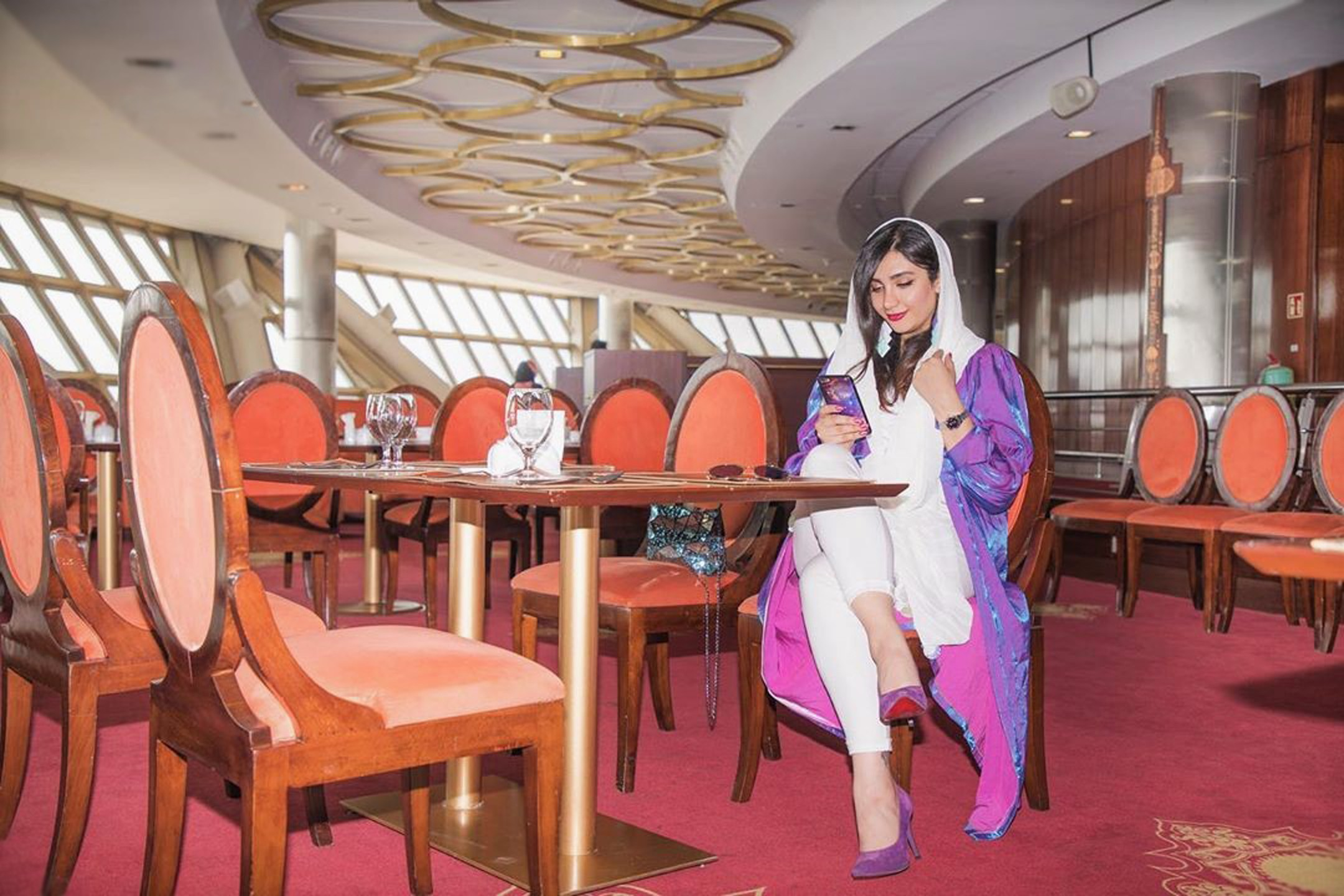
Milad Tower Revolving Restaurant, known as the largest revolving restaurant in the world.

Tehran is one of Iran's leading tourism destinations, and the city is home to an array of famous tourist attractions. In 2016, Tehran received 1.64 million foreign tourists. There are several artistic, historic and scientific museums in Tehran, including the National Museum of Iran, and the Carpet Museum.

There is also the Museum of Contemporary Art, which hosts works of artists such as Andy Warhol, Pablo Picasso and Van Gogh.

The Iranian Imperial Crown Jewels, are also on display at Tehran's National Jewelry Museum. A number of cultural and trade exhibitions take place in Tehran and many of them are popular events for tourism. Tehran International Book Fair is known to the international publishing world as one of the most important publishing events in Asia. Also, There are many parks and open spaces in the Tehran area. Access to Tehran is provided by Imam Khomeini and Mehrabad airports. Also Tehran offers many forms of public transportation: Tehran Metro, a bus rapid transit system, trolleybuses, and a large network of highways with taxis. Also, There are high-end restaurants and street food on the many streets.

=== Media ===
Tehran is home to many international and regional TV and radio stations. The public broadcaster IRIB has its headquarters in Tehran. Also Tehran has Iran's largest number of daily newspapers. The headquarters of most of Iran's global media is located in Tehran.

=== Creative industries and entertainment ===
Tehran creative arts sector comprises advertising, architecture, art, design, fashion, film, music, performing arts, publishing, software, TV, radio, and video games. Tehran is main center for Persian language film industry. The city is also home of the Fajr International Film Festival and the Shahr International Film Festival.

=== Education and research ===
Tehran is the most prolific centers of higher education and research in the Middle East. The oldest modern university of the city, University of Tehran was established in 1934 and it is one of the most prestigious universities in Asia.

== Economic History of Tehran ==
=== After 1979 Revolution ===
Prior to the 1979 Revolution, there were many foreign companies and employees in Iran. Companies of Tehran were also more international activities. After the 1979 Revolution, workers, employees, and foreign companies left Iran. With Joint Comprehensive Plan of Action, The economic situation of Tehran's companies has improved.

== See also ==
- Economy of Iran
- Economy of the Middle East
- List of companies of Iran
