= Rayen-class container ship =

Container ship class

Class overview
- Builders: Hyundai Heavy Industries
- Operators: IRISL
- In service: 2018–present
- Planned: 4
- Completed: 4
- Active: 4

General characteristics
- Type: Container ship
- Tonnage: 141,514 GT
- Length: 366 m (1,201 ft)
- Beam: 48 m (157 ft)
- Capacity: 14,500 TEU

The Rayen class is a series of 4 container ships built for Islamic Republic of Iran Shipping Line (IRISL). The ships were built by Hyundai Heavy Industries in South Korea. The ships have a maximum theoretical capacity of around 14,500 twenty-foot equivalent units (TEU). The ships were originally ordered by IRISL in 2016.

== List of ships ==
| Ship | Previous names | Yard number | IMO number | Delivery | Status | ref |
|---|---|---|---|---|---|---|
| Rayen | Tenreach (2018-2020) | 2940 | 9820245 | Sep 2018 | In service | |
| Radin | Goodreach (2018-2020) | 2941 | 9820257 | Sep 2018 | In service | |
| Barzin | Fanreach (2018-2020) | 2942 | 9820269 | Sep 2018 | In service | |
| Hamouna | Canreach (2018-2020) | 2943 | 9820271 | Sep 2018 | In service | |
