= Behnam Abolghasempour =

Iranian retired football player

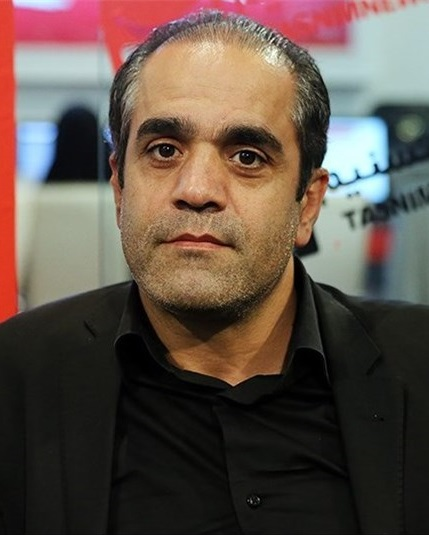

Personal information
- Full name: Behnam Abolghasempour
- Date of birth: August 24, 1973 (age 53)
- Place of birth: Rey, Iran
- Position: Forward

Youth career
- 1986–1990: Kaveh Rey
- 1990–1994: Tehran Municipality Region 20
- 1994–1996: Tolypers

Senior career*
Years	Team	Apps	(Gls)
1996–2001	Saipa		
2001–2003	Persepolis	29	(3)
2003–2006	Pas	32	(2)
2006–2007	Sorkhpoushan		

International career
2000	Iran	4	(2)

Managerial career
- 2010–2011: Rah Ahan Novin
- * Club domestic league appearances and goals

Behnam Abolghasempour (Persian: بهنام ابوالقاسم‌پور; born August 24, 1973) is an Iranian retired football player. He has played for four Iranian clubs including Saipa, Persepolis, Pas and Sorkhpoushan. He has also represented the Iran national football team four times, scoring twice. He is currently sporting director at Esteghlal Khuzestan F.C..

== Club career statistics ==
Club performance			League		Cup		Continental		Total	
Season	Club	League	Apps	Goals	Apps	Goals	Apps	Goals	Apps	Goals
Iran			League		Hazfi Cup		Asia		Total	
1999–00	Saipa	Azadegan League		3			-	-		
2000–01	Saipa	Azadegan League		6			-	-		
2001–02	Persepolis	Pro League	18	2	2	0	-	-	20	2
2002–03	Persepolis	Pro League	11	1			0	0		
2003–04	Pas	Pro League		0			-	-		
2004–05	Pas	Pro League	11	2			-	-		
2005–06	Pas	Pro League	1	0				1		
Career total										
