= MV Iran Shahr-e-Kord =

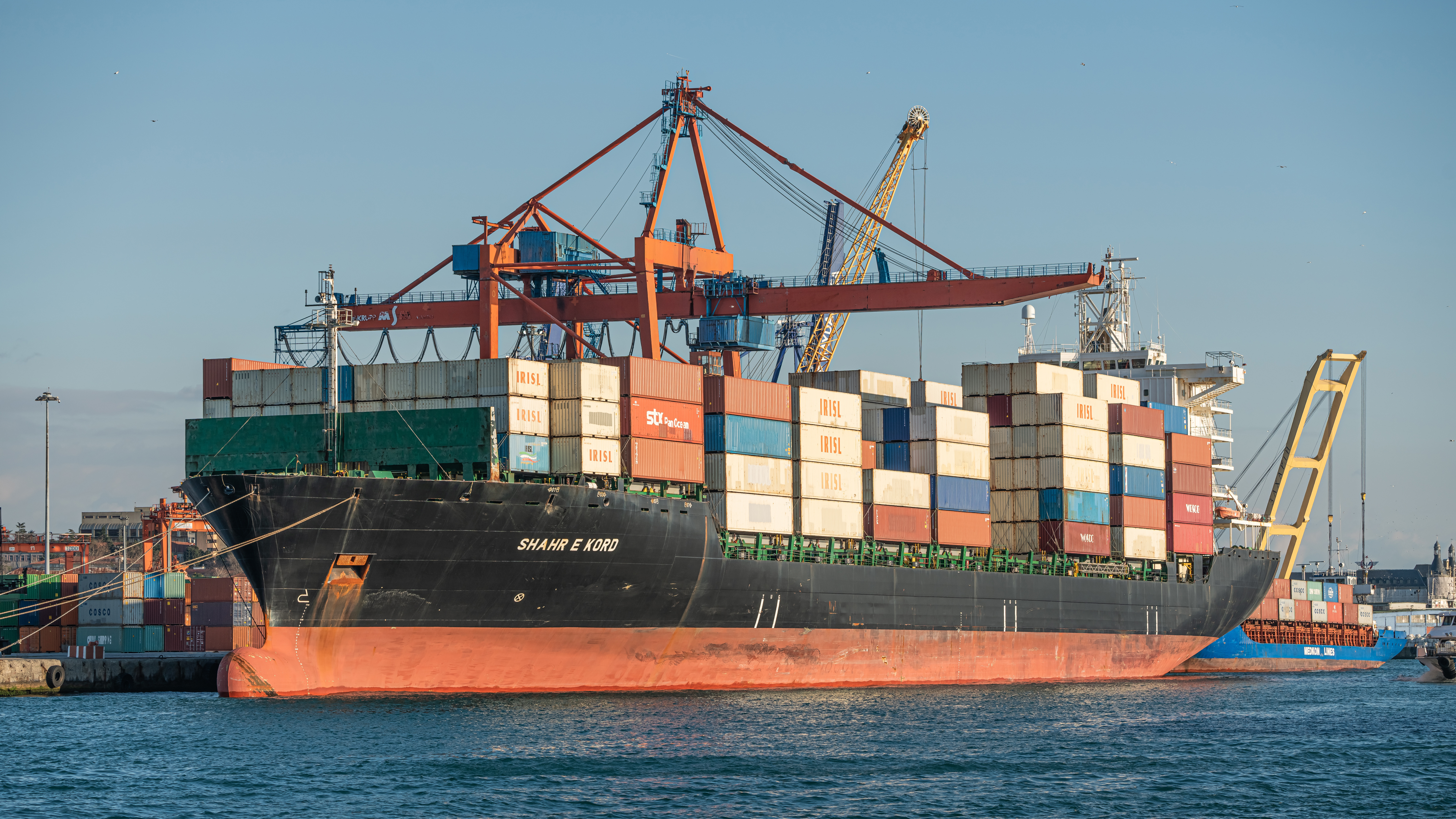

History

Iran
- Name: Iran Shahr-E-Kord
- Namesake: Shahrekord
- Owner: Iran Shipping Lines (IRISL Group)
- Port of registry: Iran
- Builder: Iran Shipbuilding & Offshore Industries Complex Company (ISOICO)
- Yard number: PG 104
- Completed: 2013 (planned)
- Identification: IMO number: 9270684
- Status: Delivered on 2012-12-12

General characteristics
- Type: Container ship
- Tonnage: 23,200 GT; 29,870 DWT
- Length: 187 m (613 ft 6 in)
- Beam: 30 m (98 ft 5 in)
- Speed: 20 knots
- Capacity: 2,200 containers

MV Iran Shahr-E-Kord is an Iranian-built container ship and the fourth Iranian vessel built by Iran Shipbuilding & Offshore Industries Complex Company (ISOICO) for Iran Shipping Lines (IRISL Group) to fulfill Iran's need for long range shipments. The vessel was launched in 2009 and is expected to enter service by 2013. The ship is able to carry 2,200 containers and has a sister ship, Iran-Arak.

In March 2021, there were reports that the vessel was targeted by an explosive object allegedly launched by Israeli forces which caused some fire, but no one on board was hurt.
