= Homa Hotel Group =

Iranian hotel chain

- Type: Government-owned, Public
- Industry: Hospitality & Tourism
- Founded: Tehran, 1979; 47 years ago
- Headquarters: Tehran, Iran
- Area served: Worldwide
- Products: Hotels & Resorts
- Parent: ISSO
- Website: homahotels.co

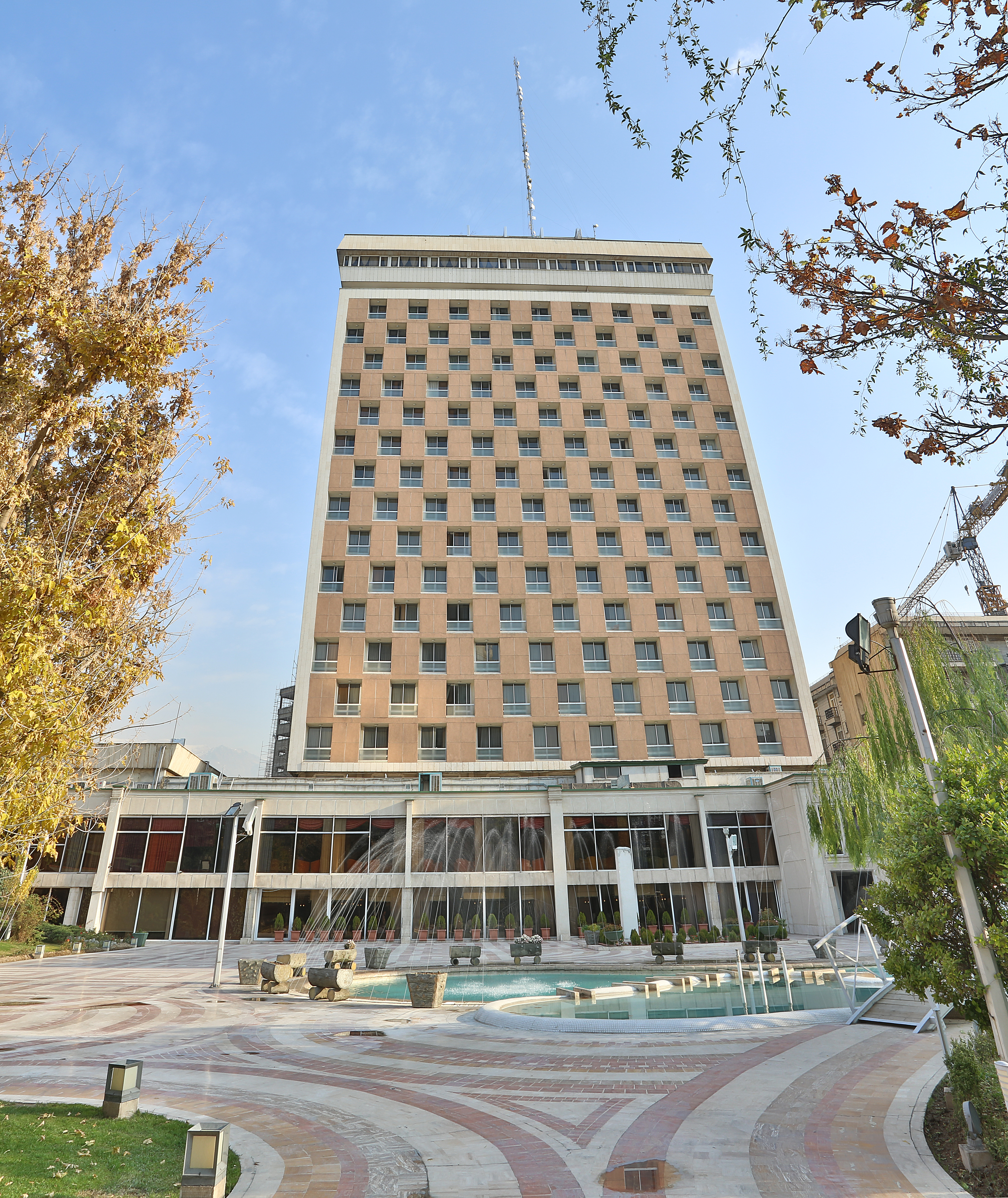
Homa Hotel Tehran

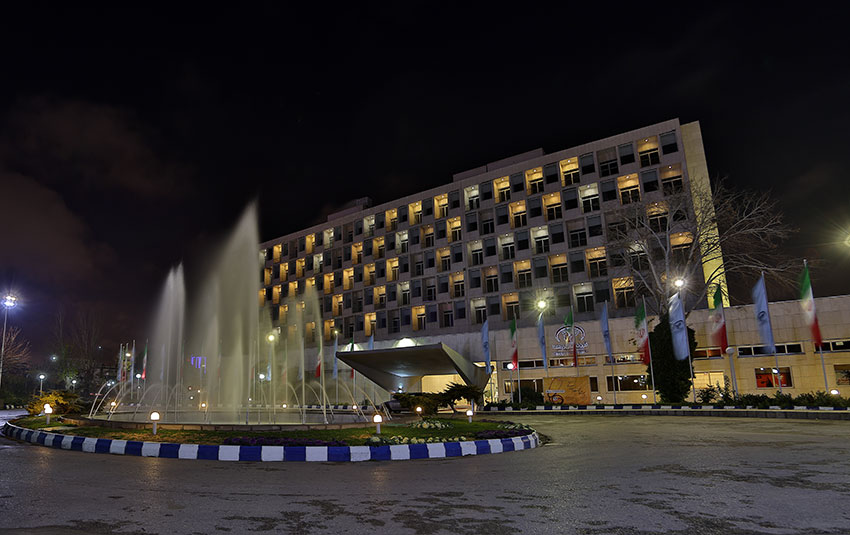
Homa Hotel Mashhad (1)

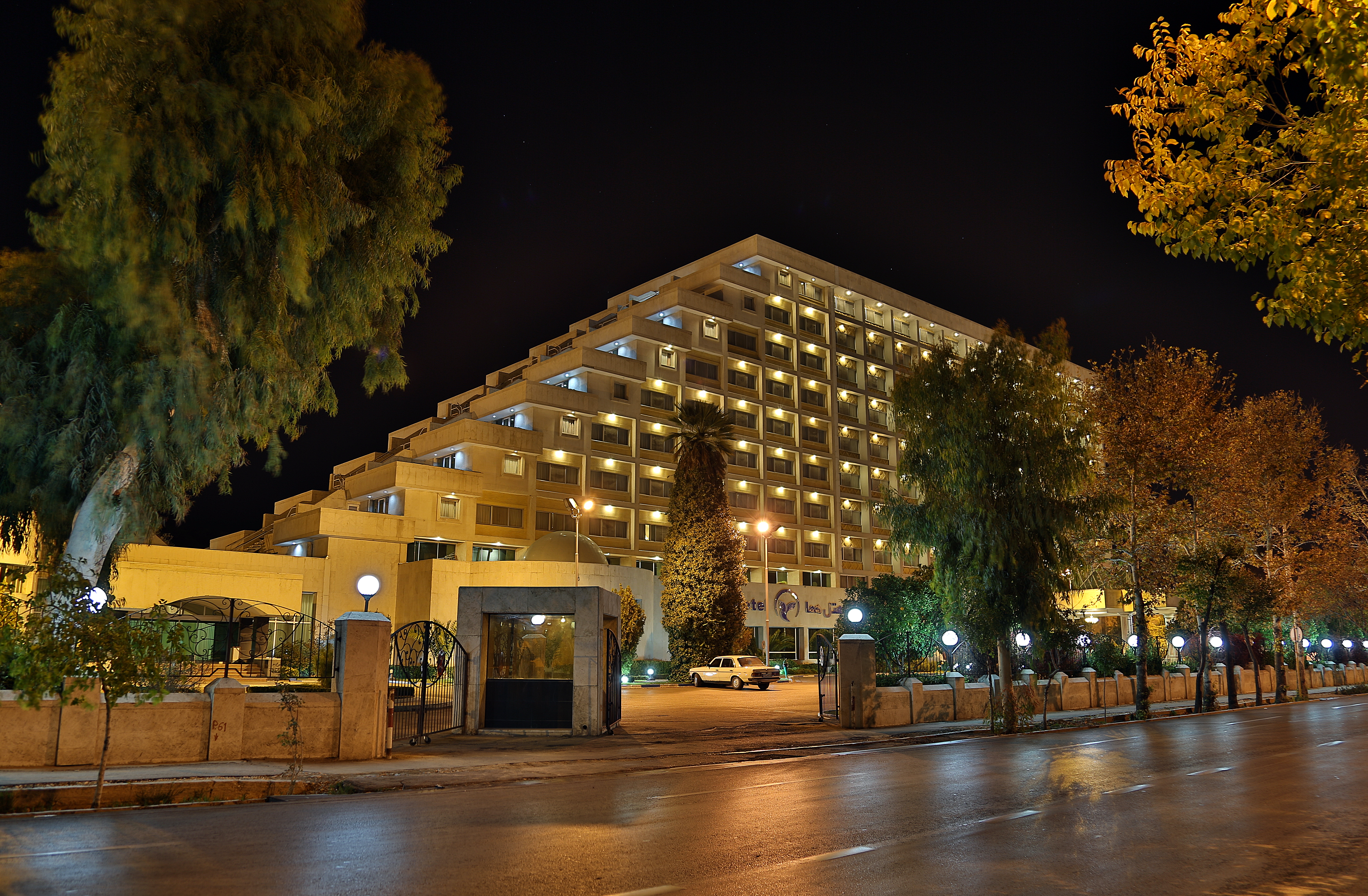
Homa Hotel Shiraz

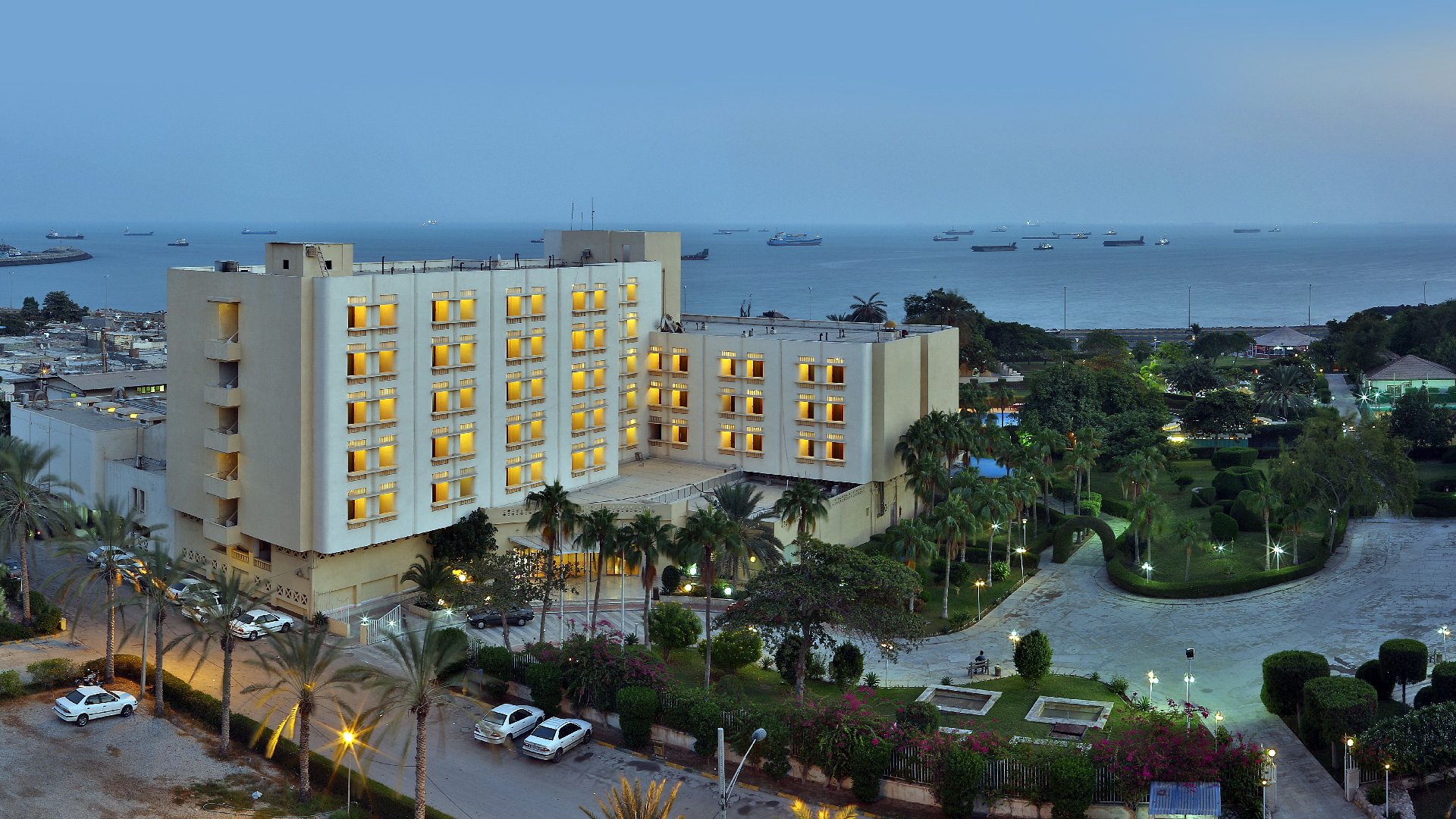
Homa Hotel Bandar Abbas

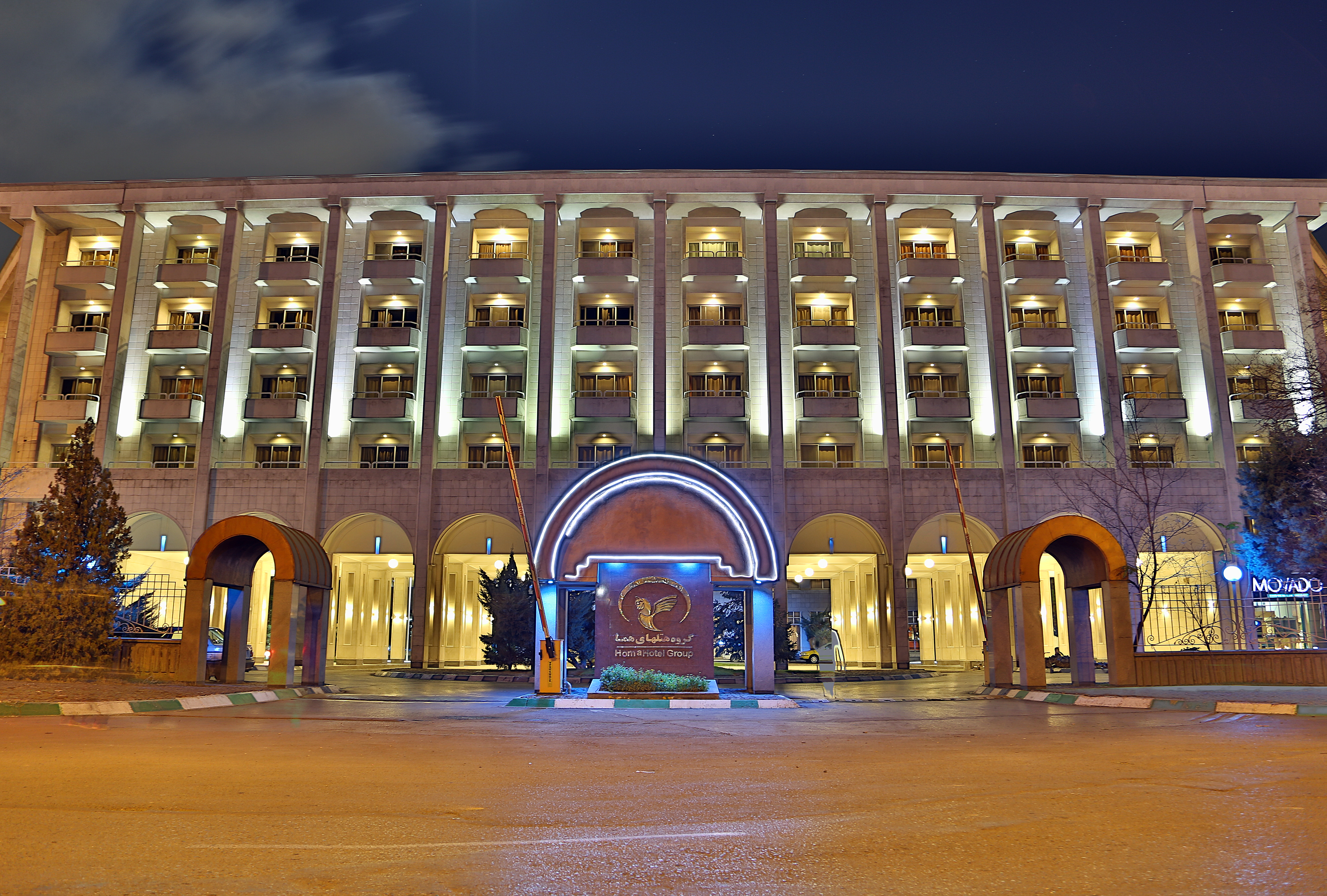
Homa Hotel Mashhad (2)

The Homa Hotel Group (Persian: گروه هتل‌های هما) is the largest hotel chain in Iran. It was a subsidiary of Iran Air until 2013, when it was taken over by the Social Security Organization.

== Overview ==
The Homa Hotels chain has more than 1,000 rooms in Tehran, Shiraz, Bandar Abbas, and Mashhad. All of its hotels were constructed prior to the 1979 Iranian Revolution, except the 2nd Mashhad Hotel which is the only Homa Hotel built by and for Homa Hotels, in the late 1990s.

== Locations ==
Homa Hotel Tehran opened in October 1971 as the Arya-Sheraton Hotel, built by Iran Air and operated by Sheraton Hotels and Resorts. It has 172 rooms and suites and is located in Vanak.

Homa Hotel Shiraz opened in October 1971 as the Hotel Cyrus Inter-Continental. It was one of three Inter-Continental Hotels which opened that month to house dignitaries and foreign tourists attending the 2,500-year celebration of the Persian Empire festivities. The other two hotels were the Inter-Continental Tehran and the Hotel Darius Inter-Continental, located adjacent to the ruins of Persepolis.

Homa Hotel Bandar Abbas is the only 4 star Hotel operated by Homa Hotels.

Homa Hotel Mashhad (1) is one of two Homa Hotels in the city of Mashhad. The 118 room hotel opened in November 1973 as the Hyatt Omar Khayyam, managed by Hyatt.

Homa Hotel Mashhad (2), the second Mashhad property, is the only Homa Hotel purpose-built for the chain. It has 202 rooms, making it the largest Homa Hotel.

== See also ==
- Tourism in Iran
