= Mohammad Saeedi =

Deputy head of Atomic Energy Organization of Iran

Mohammad Saeedi is deputy head of Atomic Energy Organization of Iran.

== Biography ==
On 30 March 2005, Saeedi said “IAEA inspectors visit (Natanz, a uranium enrichment) facility at least once a month and also use a monitoring system to check the suspension.” On 31 March 2005, journalists were allowed to accompany Iranian President Mohammad Khatami on his first official visit to the Natanz nuclear facility.

On 8 August 2005, Saeedi announced that Iran's nuclear program had been resumed at the uranium conversion facility near the city of Isfahan.

In August 2015, Saeedi was appointed managing director of IRISL Group, the largest Iranian shipping company. He resigned in July 2019.

== See also ==
- Gholam Reza Aghazadeh
