= Iran Shipbuilding & Offshore Industries Complex =

Iranian ship yard in the Persian Gulf

Iran Shipbuilding & Offshore Industries Complex Co (ISOICO)
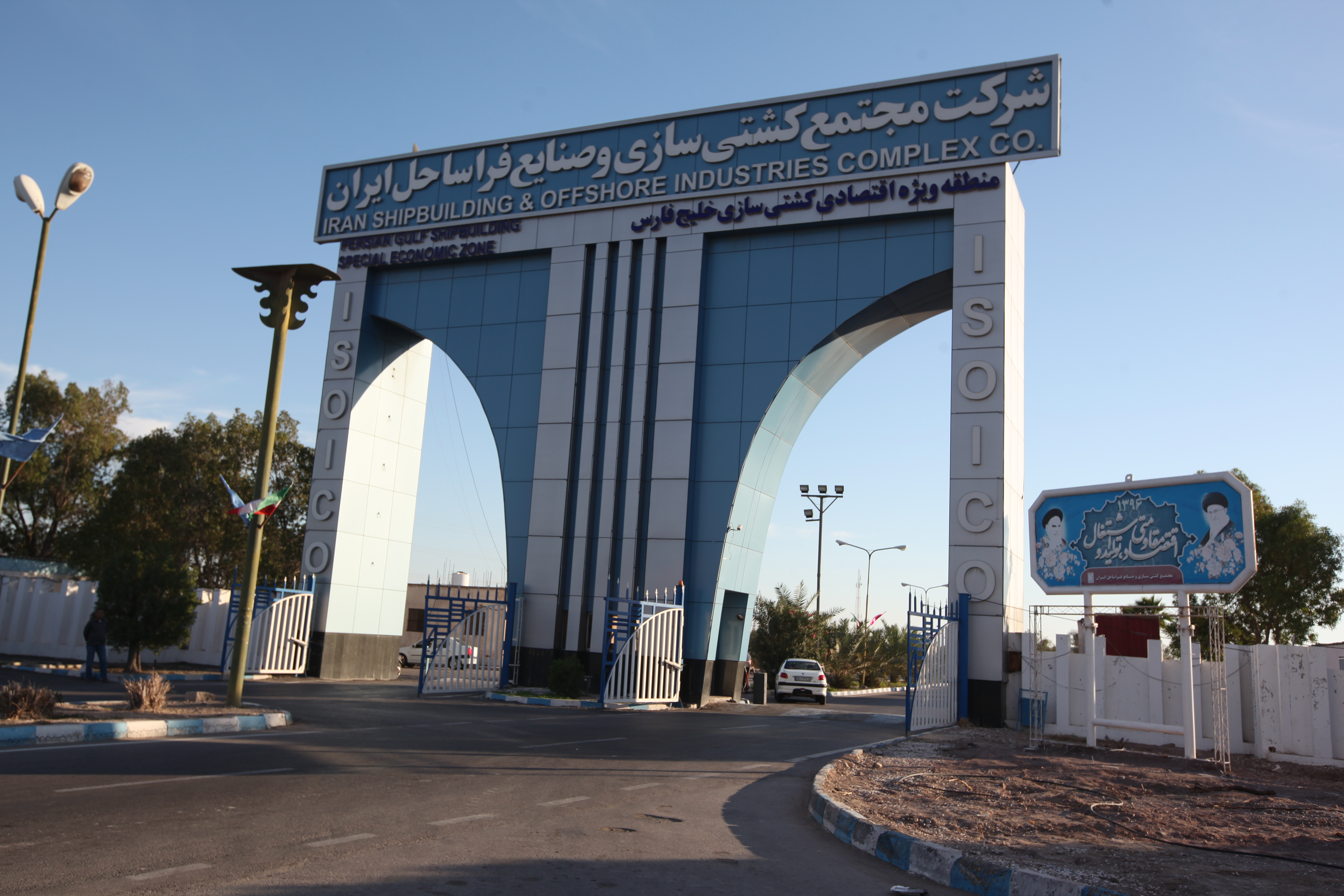
- Type: Public
- Industry: Shipbuilding
- Founded: 1973; 53 years ago
- Headquarters: Bandar Abbas, Iran,
- Products: Container & Product Carrier, Muilt-purpose cargo Ship, Ferry, FPSO/FSO, Pipe Laying, Drill-Ship, AHTS
- Parent: IDRO Group
- Website: www.isoico.co

Iran Shipbuilding & Offshore Industries Complex Co (ISOICO) is an Iranian ship yard, located in the Persian Gulf, Strait of Hormuz (37 km west Bandar Abbas City), active as shipbuilder and ship-repairer of different types of vessels and offshore structures. ISOICO is a subsidiary of IDRO.

== History ==
In October 2006, a new company has been established in the southern port city of Bandar Abbas to repair various types of ocean liners. According to ISNA, the Bandar Abbas Pars Ship Repairing Company has been formed jointly by IRISL and ISOICO. The plant has the capacity to carry out maintenance works on large vessels with 500,000-ton capacity.

ISOICO has produced Iran's first ocean liner ship named "Iran-Arak". It was launched in Hormozgan southern city port in 2009. It weighs over 7000 tons and is able to carry more than 30,000 tons of cargo or 2,200 TEU. Iran-Arak can accelerate to 32 knots (59 km/h) and is able to sail 25 days non-stop. The vessel, which has cost $50 million to construct, is 185 meters (607 feet) long, 30 meters (98 feet) wide, has 10 meters (33 feet) of draft and uses more than 16.7 MW to reach 21.5 knots (39.8 km/h).

"Iran-Shahr-e Kord" is identical to "Iran-Arak" and both ships are produced by ISOICO for Iran Shipping Lines. On Sept 11, 2011 Iran launched a third ship named "Iran-Kashan".

== Production capacity and domestic market ==
ISOICO shipyard is capable of constructing any type of vessel up to about 4 x 80,000 DWT per year on its existing building berths mainly bulk carrier, containership and oil product carrier using advance technology, afterwards the constructing capability will increase for the vessel up to about 2 x 300,000 DWT VLCC or 2 x 140,000 m3 LNG carrier per year in addition to the existing capacity.

Over the next two decades, Iran would need 500 new ships, including 120 oil tankers, 40 liquefied natural gas (LNG) carriers and over 300 commercial vessels. In 2009, in a move aimed at further enhancing Iran's shipbuilding industry, President Mahmoud Ahmadinejad said he will ban the purchase of foreign ships by Iranian organizations. The Ministry of Commerce has confirmed that Iran is able to build all its needed sea fleets inside the country.

== Ships built by ISOICO ==
- MV Iran Shahr-e-Kord (2012)

== See also ==
- Iran Shipping Lines
- National Iranian Tanker Company
