= ARJ Home Appliances Company =

Iranian home appliances company

ARJ Company
- Company type: State-owned company
- Industry: Home appliances
- Founded: 1937; 89 years ago
- Founder: Khalil Arjomand
- Headquarters: Tehran, Iran
- Products: Water coolers, air conditioners, washing machines, heaters
- Website: arjgroup.ir

Arj Home Appliance Company (Persian: ارج) is an Iranian manufacturer of home appliances. It was founded by Khalil Arjomand in 1937 as a workshop in Tehran, Iran, with eight employees.

The company initially produced water coolers and refrigerators then later began manufacturing gas heaters, washing machines, and freezers. It is one of the oldest home appliance companies in West Asia. Arj went through a turbulent period between 1979 and 2016 and was declared bankrupt in 2017. The company was revived by the Iranian government in 2022.

== History ==
=== Foundation and early years ===
The company began as with a small factory producing metal products. Gradually, it expanded its range of products and increased the number of employees to eight in the 1940s. With this growth, the brand moved to Tehran-Karaj Road, the main industrial area west of the Iranian capital, where it broadened its offerings to include a variety of household appliances.

=== Iranian revolution and decline ===
In 1979, as with many of its competitors, Arj was nationalized due to the new revolutionary policy of taking control of large private companies. By 1995 the majority of its shares were sold to Iran's largest state bank, Melli (National) Bank, which subsequently sold them on to varies private shareholders.

Over time, ARJ suffered from chronic mismanagement, outdated technology, bureaucratic inefficiencies, and price distortions—often kept afloat by subsidized loans that only increased its debt. During the 2000s, its workforce shrank from over 1,000 to fewer than 300, and productivity and quality declined amid rising foreign competition.

=== Bankruptcy and closure 2016 - 2021 ===
As a result of increasing competition from foreign brands and mounting financial problems, the company declared bankruptcy in the 2016–17 fiscal year. Arj officially ceased operations in 2016 due to escalating production challenges.

Commentators cited several reasons for its closure: poor public administration and inefficient management policies, exchange rate fluctuations that led to a huge surge in imports, lack of strategic planning,and outdated technology and low-quality products.

=== Revival of the brand ===
In 2021, the Iranian Ministry of Industry began negotiations with corporations such as General Electric, Whirlpool Corporation, and the Italian Ariston Thermo to revive and modernise named Iranian companies like Arj.

In March 2022, Arj reopened after a five-year hiatus following a 2 trillion‑rial (USD $7.6 million) investment by Social Security Investment Co., creating approximately 800 direct and 2,500 indirect jobs. The company now uses completely knocked down (CKD) and semi-knocked down (SKD) to build modern appliances. One of its most popular products is the swamp (evaporative) coolers which is sold domestically and exported to Iraq, Pakistan, Azerbaijan and other countries.
