= Maadiran Group =

- Type: Public
- Traded as: مادیرا
- Industry: Consumer Electronics
- Founded: 1964; 62 years ago
- Headquarters: Vanak, Tehran, Iran
- Products: Technology; Electronic; Office equipment Support
- Number of employees: 1400

The Maadiran Group was established in 1964 and focuses on consumer goods manufacturing, distribution and after-sales support services.

The group operates through several subsidiaries, including electronics, home appliances, plastics, support services, chain stores and green energy businesses.

Maadiran manufactures televisions and monitors under the X-Vision and TCL brands. Its home-appliance operations include refrigerators, dishwashers, washing machines and vacuum cleaners, while its plastics operations manufacture components and other plastic products.

 Its home appliances unit manufactures refrigerators, dish washers, washing machines and vacuum cleaners.  Plastic parts for the above, as well as plastic water pitchers under the xelle brand and biodegradable bags under the kisabz brand, are made by its plastics unit. Its retail stores distribute and sell Maadiran products directly to the end consumer.  After-sales support services are responsible for servicing and maintaining the product guarantees for all of the above.

== Management ==
Amirhossein Mortezaian is the chief executive officer of Maadiran Electronic Industries Company, one of the group's subsidiaries.

== Maadiran brand ==
(2000–Present) The first logo in which the company was referred to as Maadiran.

== History ==
Maadiran's plastics manufacturing operations were established in 2002 as part of the group's efforts to produce plastic components for its office machinery and other products. The group's plastics factory was established in the Hashtgerd area and was subsequently expanded to provide additional manufacturing capabilities.
