= Aabsal =

Iranian home appliances manufacturer

Aabsal PLC
- Type: Public; TSE: ASAL1; ISIN: IRO1ASAL0003
- Industry: Major appliances, Small appliances
- Founded: 1956; 70 years ago
- Headquarters: Tehran, Iran
- Area served: Persian Gulf, Caspian Sea, Mediterranean Sea
- Key people: Goodarz Hakimnejad (Chairman & CEO)
- Products: Clothes washers and dryers, refrigerators, freezers, dishwashers, ranges, compactors, room air conditioners, microwaves ovens, counter top appliances
- Website: www.aabsalco.com

Aabsal (Persian: آبسال, Ābsāl) is one of the major manufacturers of home appliances in Iran. Aabsal was established in 1956 and is listed on the Tehran Stock Exchange. The company manufactures air coolers, gas heaters, gas cookers and washing machines among other products.

== Operations ==
Aabsal Co. engages in the manufacture and sale of automatic front loading washing machines, dishwashers, water evaporative air coolers, and room Gas heaters in Iran. The company serves customers through a network of sales representatives. Aabsal Co. was formerly known as Universal PLC. and changed its name in 1983.

While established in Tehran, Aabsal currently has 348 locations across Iran.
