= Iran Road Maintenance & Transportation Organization =

- Company type: Government-owned corporation
- Industry: Road Maintenance
- Founded: 1982; 44 years ago
- Headquarters: Tehran, Iran
- Website: www.rmto.ir/en

Highways and roads in Iran are managed by Iran Road Maintenance & Transportation Organization (سازمان راهداری و حمل‌ونقل جاده‌ای).

== History ==
For the first time "Road Transport deputy" was raised as one of the five deputies of "Road and Transport Ministry" in organizational structure in 1982. This deputy was one of 9 "Ministry deputies" before separating from "Road and Transport Ministry" at the last organizational status. Establishing the special limited-stock of public terminals of good vehicles was approved in 1988 in order to exploit, develop, maintain and construction of public terminals and en-route welfare-service complexes.

At the outset, this organization had two affiliated company in the name of "Islamic Republic of Iran Transport Company" and "IRI International Transport Company", which according to the ratification of High Council Administration "IRI Transport Company" was separated from organization in 2002.

In the last organizational change, through Administrative High Council ratification number 1901/74022 dated 2003/6/13 all duties, workforce, equipments, obligations and credits of maintenance deputy of "Road and Transport Ministry" was transferred to state terminals and transport organization and the aforesaid deputy was omitted and according to the mentioned ratification paragraph (5), duties and directing affairs of "State Transport High Council Secretariat" was separated from organization and transferred to "Road and Transport Ministry" and the name of the organization changed to "Road Maintenance and Transport Organization".

== Duties ==
- To provide required facilities and grounds to improve and optimally utilize the road transportation system and to implement the comprehensive and coordinated policies in the area of road transportation under the Law for Social, cultural, Economic Development of the country.
- To prepare Policies, approaches and planning in field of road maintenance and Transportation and to coordinate executive fields among different sub-section
- To prepare bills, enactments, by-Laws and procedures required in field of internal and international transportation and road maintenance; and to submit them to competent authorities.
- To encourage non-governmental sector to invest and operate business affairs in the field of road maintenance and transportation within related Laws and regulations.
- To supervise and approve technical and executive regulations to maintain roads, technical and installation buildings and to notify them to concerned sections.
- To study and investigate the situations of all state roads (across the country) with respect to climate characteristics of each region, and to maintain rights of way, and to prepare required Standards and rules.
- To study, prepare and produce plans for road maintenance periodically, continuously, intermittently, emergency-oriental and to plan to tackle with crises due to unpredictable and force major events.
- To issue license for road transportation companies and other permissions required for operation of internal and international transportation and to provide required essentials to facilitate exportations and transit affairs.
- To issue permission for establishment of enroute welfare and service complexes and mechanized centers for technical test of heavy vehicles by privates cooperative and governmental sectors.
- To grant utilization license especial for state roads network, including travel permit for foreign Vehicles, Special for traffic Loads under related rules and regulations.
- To supervise preparation and presentation of plans, projects. In field of road maintenance, technical buildings, sites and to proceed studies and planning which are required to be made.
- To utilize, develop and maintain required installations to provide appropriate services in field of road maintenance and transportation such as tollman house, border terminals, TIR-Parks and enrute welfare facilities built in roads and navigation control centers.
- To study and determine the types, number and specifications of existing fleet and machineries and those required for road maintenance and transportation and to proceed required actions, to promote utilities and cooperation in providing them.
- To supervise operations and performance of passenger and cargo transportation companies to ensure the good fulfillment of rules and regulations.
- To supervise operations and performance of the activities related to road buildings maintenance and equipment of country roads with horizontal and vertical signs.
- To supervise the activities of provincial Road and Transportation departments in the field of road maintenance and to follow required coordination.
- To proceed general educations and expert training for the personnel of organization, operators and drivers to provide them with necessary backgrounds to promote essential expertise for road transportation fleet in the country through Iranian and abroad training centers.
- To aggregate basic statistics and information of road transportation and maintenance under the cooperation of related organization and institutes and to establish data bank.
- To proceed planning in order to develop the transit roads of the country.
