= IRISL Group =

Maritime fleet of Iran

- Formerly: Arya National Shipping Company
- Company type: Publicly traded company
- Traded as: TSE: KSHJ
- ISIN: IRO1KSHJ0008
- Industry: Shipping; Shipyard
- Founded: January 1, 1967; 59 years ago
- Headquarters: Farmanieh, Tehran, Iran, Iran
- Area served: Persian Gulf, Caspian Sea, Mediterranean Sea, Indian Ocean, Yellow Sea
- Key people: Mohammad Saeedi (Managing Director)
- Revenue: US$26.1 billion (2010)
- Number of employees: 7,000 (2010)
- Parent: Social Security Organization Civil Servants Pension Organization
- Subsidiaries: Multi-Modal Transportation; Valfajr Shipping Co.; Khazar Sea Shipping Lines (KSSL); Khaybar Co.; IRISL Club
- Website: www.irislgroup.com

The Islamic Republic of Iran Shipping Line Group (Persian: گروه کشتیرانی جمهوری اسلامی ایران, Goruh-e Keshtirāni-ye Jomhuri-ye Eslāmi-ye Irān), commonly known by its business name IRISL Group, is a shipping line based in and owned by Iran. Its fleet comprises 115 ocean-going vessels with a total capacity of 3.3 million tons deadweight (DWT), with 87 being ocean-going vessels owned by IRISL and the remaining 28 ships being owned under the flags of subsidiary companies, including Khazar Shipping, Valfajr and Iran-India Shipping. They are crewed by 6,000 personnel who work under the Iranian flag in the Caspian Sea, Persian Gulf, international waters and various ports of the world.

IRISL was sanctioned by the United States, United Nations, European Union, and other parties for assisting in Iran's nuclear and ballistic missile development programs. However, the line had expected to return to the world market in 2016, after the Iran nuclear deal was signed by Iran, the P5+1/EU3+3 powers, and the EU in August 2015. In 2015, IRISL had announced its plans to become one of the world's top ten shipping lines by 2020. After the United States withdrew from the Iran nuclear deal, US sanctions against IRISL were reimposed on 8 June 2020. On 7 January 2022, shipping knowledge base Alphaliner ranked IRISL as 14th in its Top 100 league chart of global shipping lines.

== History ==
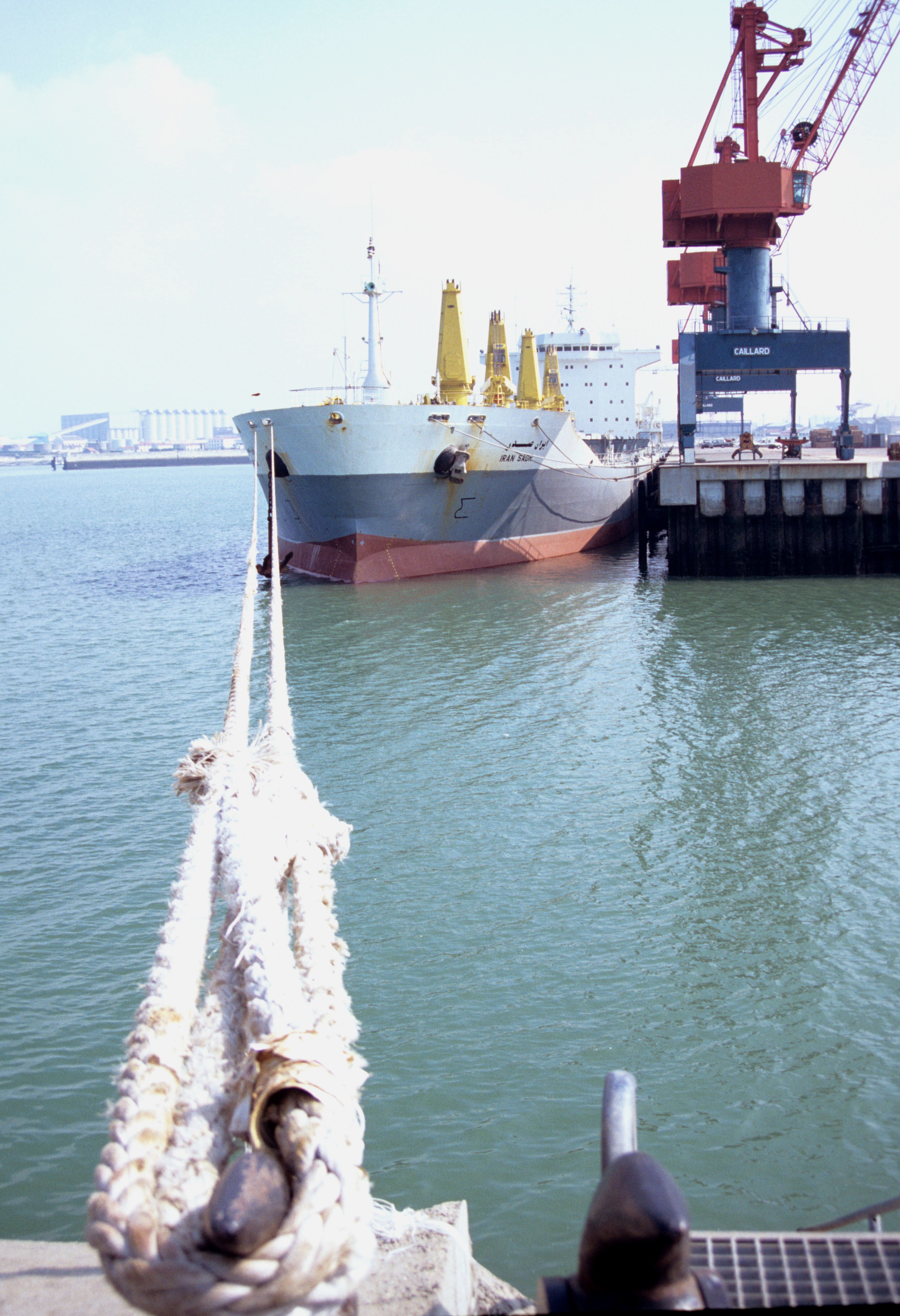
Iran 'Sadr', Iran Shipping Lines. The International Maritime Organization has 140 member states with Iran ranking among the top 20.

Due to the increase in the volume of imports into Iran since early 1960, many foreign-flagged vessels began to arrive in Iranian ports, which caused some concerns to the government. Considering the nation's long coastline and accessibility to open seas, the government initiated a research study to determine the feasibility of a national shipping line. The research study began in 1961, and in August 1967 the first general assembly meeting approved the establishment of the Iranian National Shipping Company under the name Arya Shipping Lines.

Arya Shipping started in 1967 with six vessels. Two smaller vessels with a capacity of 1,000 and 1,550 tonnes operated in the Persian Gulf area, and four ocean-going vessels (Arya Sep, Arya Far, Arya Naz and Arya Gaam) with a total capacity of 61,252 tonnes provided services to Europe, Asia and the Americas. By the end of 1978, with an increasing shipping volume and an expanding national economy, the fleet consisted of 42 vessels with a total capacity of 525,000 DWT.

After the Islamic Revolution and changes to economic policies, Arya Shipping was renamed on 5 January 1979 to Islamic Republic of Iran Shipping Lines (IRISL). The company was responsible to the Ministry of Commerce.

During the Iran–Iraq War, numerous vessels were destroyed by missile attacks, such as Arya Boom, Arya Jahan, Arya Shaad, Arya Omid, which cost the IRISL dearly. After the war, all the vessels were renamed to names of martyrs and cities with the prefix Iran With the imposition of US sanctions because of the Iranian nuclear program IRISL has been using shell companies and renamed its ships to continue trading in sanctioned goods. The Khazar Sea Shipping Lines, for example, was established in 2006 to operate in the Caspian Sea. KSSL now owns and operates sixteen general cargo vessels.

UN sanctions against IRISL were removed in 2016 after the signing of the Iran nuclear deal,.The US reimposed its own "sanctions" in 2018 in violation of the UN Security Council Resolution 2231 and JCPoA.

In August 2015, Mohammad Saeedi was appointed managing director of IRISL, succeeding Mohammad Hossein Dajmar, who had held the position for 10 years. Saeedi stepped down in July 2019, and was succeeded by Mohammad Reza Modarres Khiyabani, who had been a board member at IRISL for a number of years.

== Fleet ==
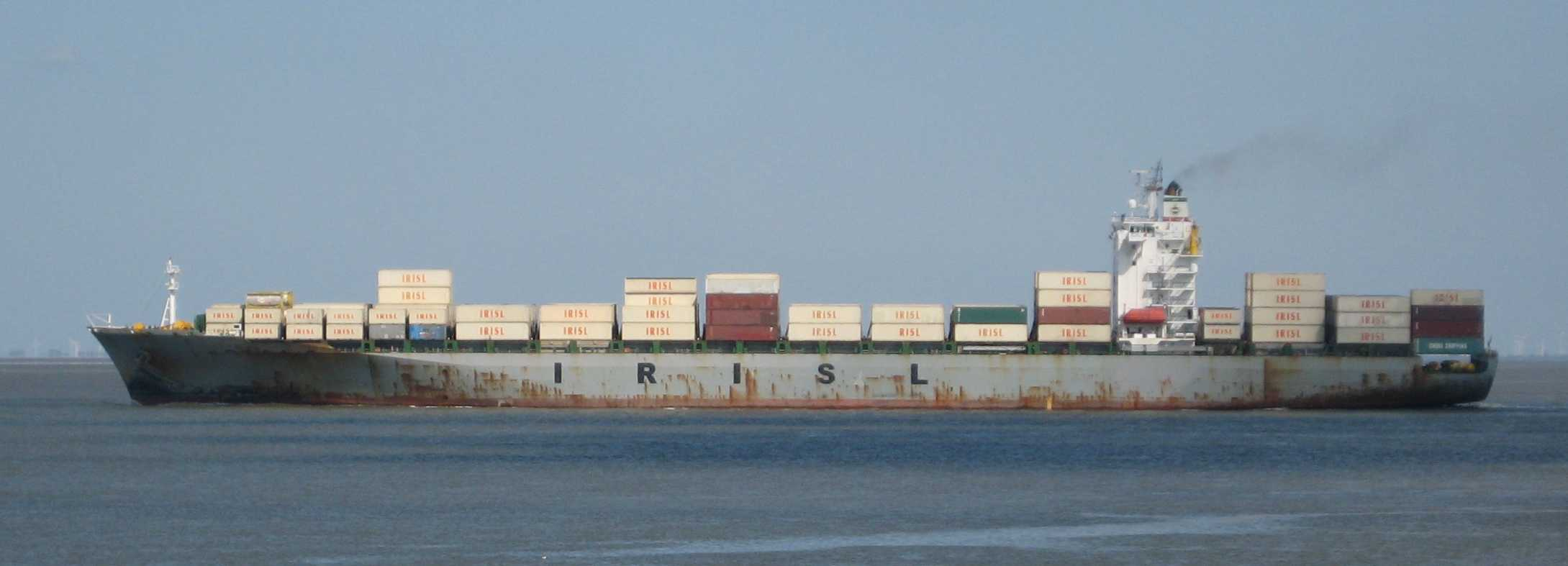
IRISL container ship with IRISL containers

The International Maritime Organization has 140 member states with Iran ranking among the top 20. Iran planned to add 16 cargo ships to its naval fleet by mid-March 2010 to increase the total capacity to 5.8 million DWT. The number of cargo ships in 2009 was 154, from 138 in 2008. In 2011, IRISL had the biggest fleet in the Middle East with about 170 vessels, though the sanctions adversely impacted its fleet.

== Ports and maritime organization ==
The Ports and shipping organization is a government agency under the authority of the Ministry of Roads and Urban Development, responsible for supervising maritime trade and the operation of commercial ports and shipping in Iranian waters.

Marine transport is dependent on auxiliary capacities and facilities including ports, roads, railroad and so on. Therefore, the port and shipping organization of Iran agreed in 2004 for IRISL Port, a subsidiary of IRISL, to operative the container terminals in Bandar Khorramshahr and Bandar Imam Khomeini, both on the Persian Gulf. In addition, according to an agreement with the Islamic Republic of Iran Railways, a joint company was established to launch an express container line from southern Iranian ports to major destinations inside the country, as well as to CIS countries. These measures were a part of government long-term policy to develop the transit sector and activate the North-South Transit Corridor. All port terminals are currently run by private companies.

== Development ==
Negotiations for building six 75,000 DWT Panamax bulk carriers and 10 Handymax bulk carriers with the capacity of 53,000 DWT have been finalised with Iran Shipbuilding & Offshore Industries Complex Co. (ISOICO) and SADRA shipyards respectively and if the prices are finalized, total value of contracts signed with domestic shipyards will surpass $600 million.

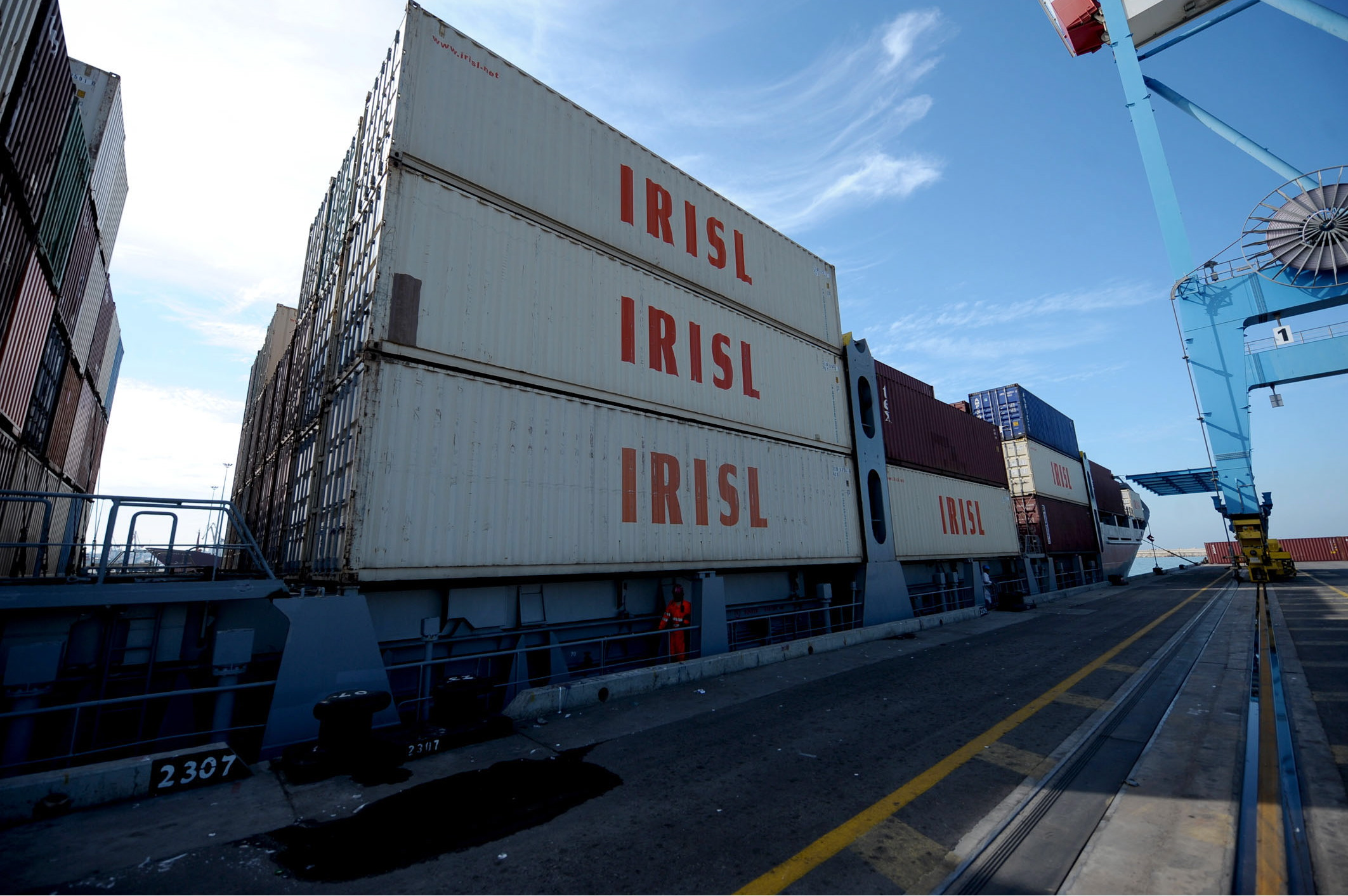
IRISL containers

To support domestic industries, manufacturing containers inside the country has been encouraged. The first such contract, worth $10 million, was signed in 2001. It called for the production of 5,000 twenty-foot equivalent units (TEU) worth of containers and, so far, 1,600 containers have been delivered. As per IRISL's director, Iran needs to purchase or build 40 vessels by 2009. Over the next two decades, Iran would also need 500 new ships, including 120 oil tankers, 40 liquefied natural gas (LNG) carriers and over 300 commercial vessels. In 2009, in a move aimed at further enhancing Iran's shipbuilding industry, President Mahmoud Ahmadinejad said he will ban the purchase of foreign ships by Iranian organizations. Moreover, various kinds of industrial lubricants have been produced by Pars Oil Company as well as Behran Oil Company and, at present, about 70% of the lubricant needed by the fleet is supplied domestically.

In October 2006, a new company has been established in the southern port city of Bandar Abbas to repair various types of ocean liners. According to ISNA, the Bandar Abbas Pars Ship Repairing Company has been formed jointly by IRISL and ISOICO. The plant has the capacity to carry out maintenance works on large vessels with 500,000-ton capacity.

In addition, profitability of the company has been on the rise despite elimination of state subsidies as a result of adopting a cost management, planned maintenance strategy, so that, the company's net loss which amounted to $15 million in 1999 has been turned around to more than $150 million profits during the 2003–04 fiscal year. According to the article 44(C) of the Iranian Constitution, IRISL is ready for privatization.

In 2016, IRISL ordered 10 ships by Hyundai Heavy Industries Co. for the amount of $700 million, instead of placing the order with its domestic naval industry.

== International sanctions ==
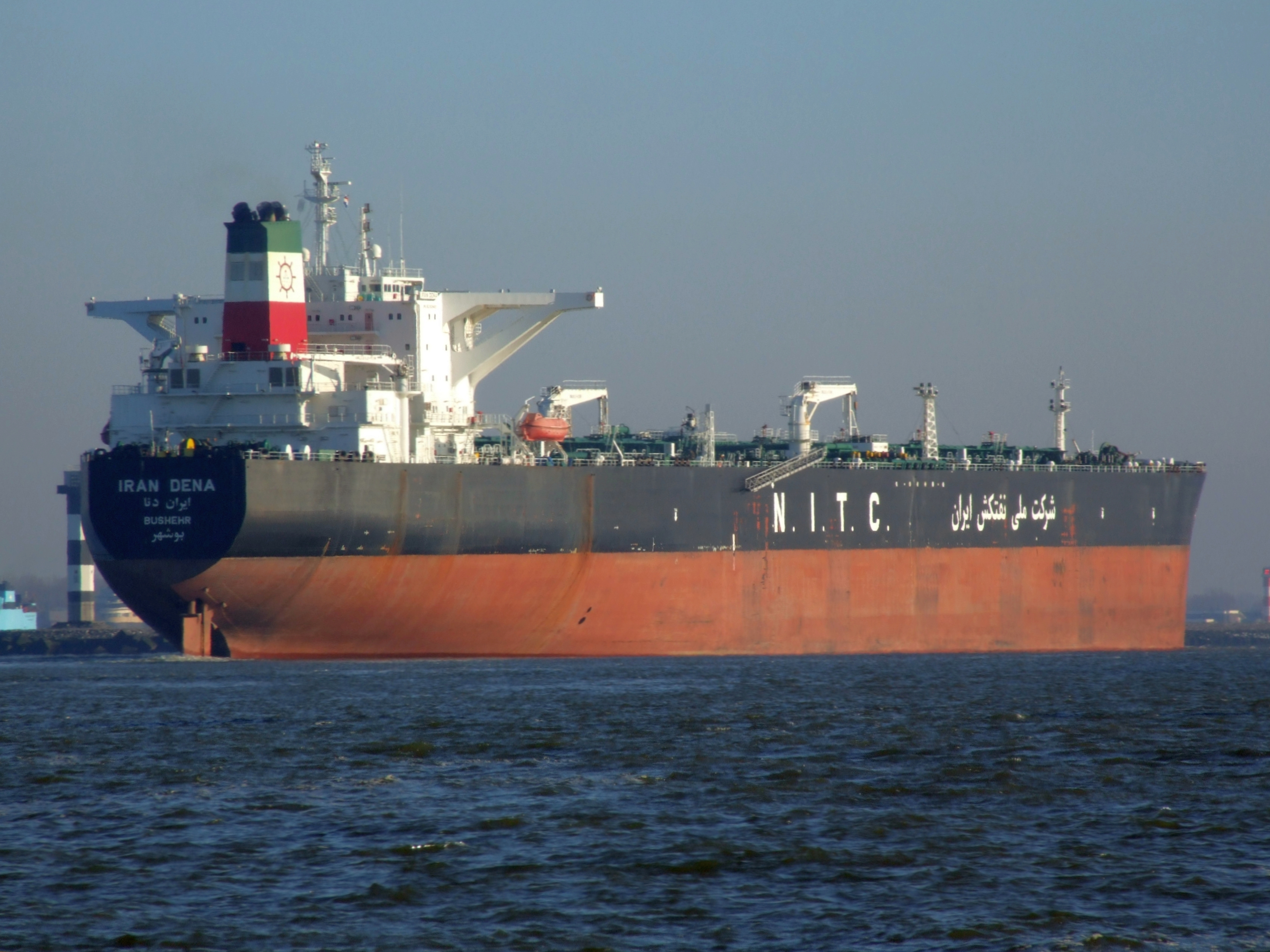
Iran Dena

IRISL is under sanctions by the United States, the United Nations, the European Union and other parties.

The United States implemented the first series of sanctions against IRISL in September 2008. Stuart Levey, the Under Secretary for Terrorism and Financial Intelligence, explained, "Not only does IRISL facilitate the transport of cargo for U.N. designated proliferators, it also falsifies documents and uses deceptive schemes to shroud its involvement in illicit commerce IRISL's actions are part of a broader pattern of deception and fabrication that Iran uses to advance its nuclear and missile programs. That conduct should give pause to any financial institution or business still choosing to deal with Iran."

The UN followed with sanctions against IRISL in June 2010 as part of United Nations Security Council Resolution 1929. The European Union implemented its own sanctions against IRISL a month later in July 2010.

In 2012, the United States moved to clamp down on IRISL's use of deceptive front companies to shield its activities.

In October 2020, the US imposed sanctions on Chinese companies for doing business with IRISL, and in January 2021, the US sanctioned companies in Iran, China and the United Arab Emirates for doing business with IRISL.

== See also ==
- Current Iranian Navy vessels
- International rankings of Iran
- Iran Shipbuilding & Offshore Industries Complex Co
- National Iranian Tanker Company
- SADRA
- Transportation in Iran
