= Data Processing Iran Co. =

Company of Iran

- Type: Public
- Traded as: TSE: DADE1; ISIN: IRO1DADE0006
- Industry: Computer Systems; Computer Software; IT Consulting; IT Services
- Founded: 1957 as IBM Iran, 1981 as DP Iran Co.
- Headquarters: Tehran, Iran
- Key people: Seyed Zabihollah Feizabadi (CEO)
- Number of employees: 400 (Full-Time)
- Website: www.dpi.ir

Data Processing Iran Company (DPI; Persian: داده‌پردازی ایران, Dadheperdazi-ye Iran) is a computer, technology and IT Consulting corporation headquartered in Tehran, Iran. DPI is a major technology provider in Iran

DPI manufactures and sells computer hardware and software (with a focus on the latter), and offers infrastructure services, hosting services, and consulting services in areas ranging from mainframe computers to nanotechnology.

The company also offers a series of Internet-related services, namely dedicated servers; colocation services; Web hosting services, such as shared hosting, shared mail, DNS recording, and domain registration services; and managed services, including network services, security services, managed application services, storage and backup services, monitoring and reporting, and professional services.

== History ==
DPI was established in 1959 as a regional branch for the IBM corporation. The company operated as a subsidiary until 1981, when IBM's operations in Iran were ceded to the Iranian government. In 2001, DPI became a private company, listed under the Tehran Stock Exchange. Over the company's history, DPI has signed numerous technology-sharing agreements with other software companies, including Mindscape, Dataproducts and Hypercom.

== See also ==
- Communications in Iran
