= Yazd Tire =

Yazd rubber industries complex
- Company type: Joint-stock company
- Industry: Auto and truck parts
- Founded: Yazd, Iran 1985; 41 years ago
- Headquarters: Yazd, Iran
- Products: Tires, travel assistance services
- Revenue: ▲0.043 million IRR (2010)
- Operating income: ▲0.020 million IRR (2010)
- Total assets: 0.256 million IRR (2010)
- Owner: Artawheel Tire (61.4%)
- Website: yric.com

Yazd rubber industries complex (Persian: مجتمع صنایع لاستیک یزد, Mijitim'-e Sânai'-ye Lâstik-e Yezd), also known as Yazd Tire (یزد تایر), is an Iranian tire manufacturer for automobiles, commercial trucks, light trucks, SUVs, race cars, airplanes, and heavy earth-mover machinery. It has been established since 1985.

== Operations ==
Yazd Tire is a joint-stock company; Artawheel Tire and Social Security Investment Group are the company's largest shareholders.

== See also ==
- Goldstone Tires
