= Goldstone Tires =

Artawheel Tire Industrial Complex
- Type: Public; Farabourse: پارتا; ISIN: IRO7ARTP0003
- Industry: Auto and truck parts
- Founded: Ardabil, Iran
- Headquarters: Tehran, Iran
- Key people: Arsalan Omatali (CEO)
- Products: Tires, travel assistance services
- Revenue: ▲0.038 million IRR (2010)
- Operating income: ▲0.109 million IRR (2010)
- Total assets: 1,372,585 million IRR (2010)
- Number of employees: 71,000
- Website: goldstonetire.com

Artawheel Tire Industrial Complex (Persian: مجتمع صنعتی آرتاویل تایر, Mojtama'-e San'ati-ye Ârtâvīl Tâyer), operating under the brand Goldstone Tires (گلدستون تایر) is an Iranian tire manufacturer for automobiles, commercial trucks, light trucks, SUVs, race cars, airplanes, and heavy earth-moving machinery.

Artawheel Tire is currently the largest non-governmental owned tire manufacturer in Iran by marketshare. The company currently has agreements with Iran Khodro to develop tires for the Peugeot 206 Models

== Operations ==
When the company was established, Goldstone had a primary annual production capacity of 5,000 tons. However, in 2009 this figure has increased to 25,000 tons per year.

Goldstone Tires was, as of 2011, one of the largest exporters of tires in Iran.

== See also ==
- Yazd Tire
