= Sepanta International =

Oil Drilling Company

Sepanta International is a worldwide oil and natural gas extraction and drilling company. Principal extraction activities are in Iran, the United Arab Emirates, China, Belgium and Canada. In addition, Sepanta also operates other businesses that market and develop oil rig and drilling technologies. Sepanta's headquarters are currently located in Tehran, Iran.

== Operations ==
Sepata was established in Ahvaz, Iran, located on 28,000 m^{2} of the Azadegan Oil Field.

In 2008, Sepanta signed a cooperation agreement with Belorussian firm Belorusneft, becoming the third Iranian oil and gas corporation to be active in the nation.

== See also ==
- Energy in Iran
- Ministry of Petroleum (Iran)
