= Laleh International Hotel =

Hotel in Tehran, Iran

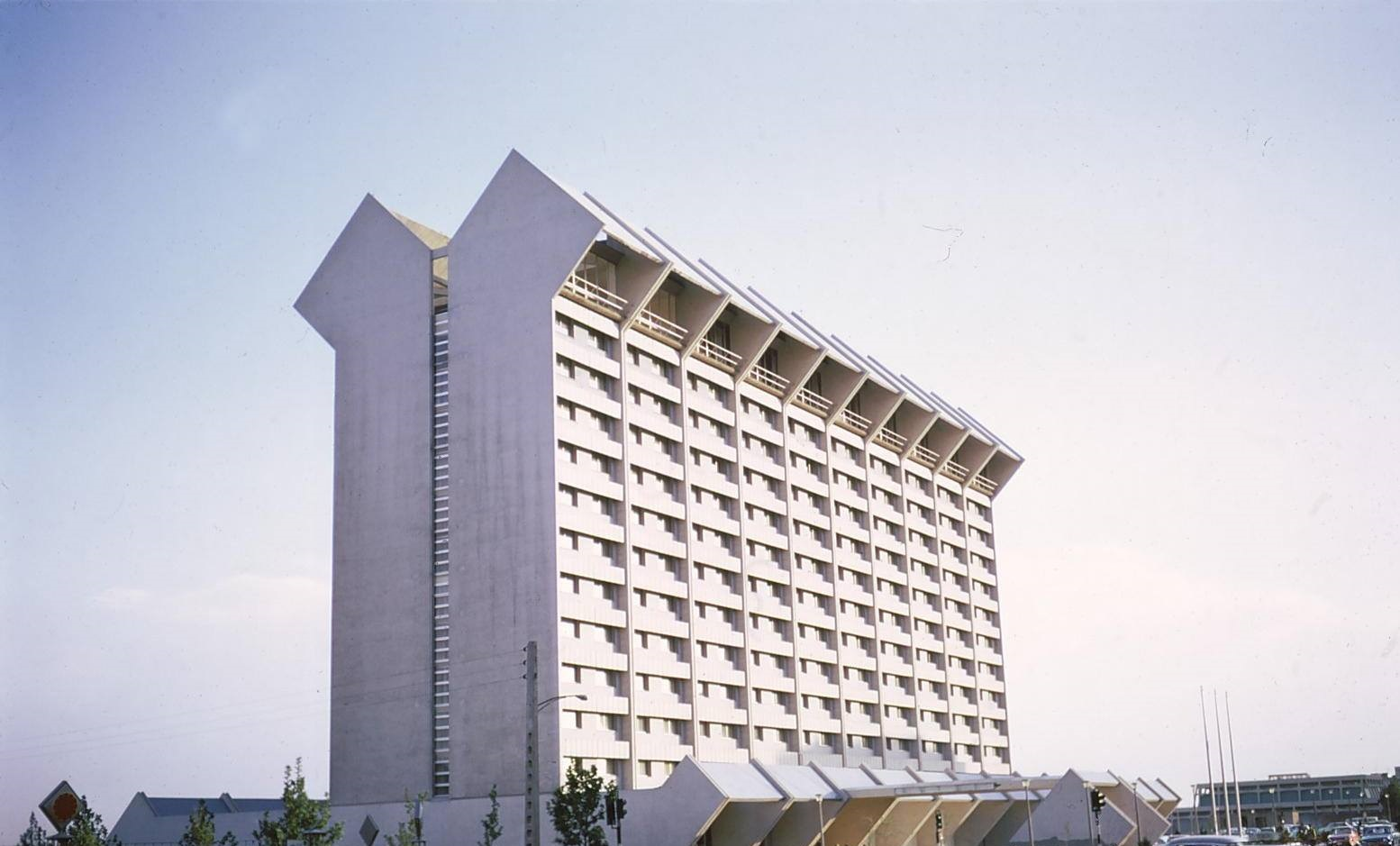
- Inter-Continental Tehran, 1973
- Interactive map of the Laleh International Hotel area
- Hotel chain: Laleh International Hotel Group

General information
- Location: Tehran, Iran
- Coordinates: 35.715460°N 51.393879°E
- Opening: October 1971
- Management: Laleh International Hotels Co.

Technical details
- Floor count: 13
- Floor area: 16,000 m2

Other information
- Number of rooms: 380
- Number of restaurants: 4

Website
- http://lalehhotels.com/

The Laleh International Hotel (Persian: هتل بین‌المللی لاله) is a hotel in Tehran, Iran, next to Laleh Park, with views of the Alborz and Mount Damavand.

== History ==
The Inter-Continental Tehran opened in October 1971. The 13-story, 400-room hotel was built to house foreign tourists attending the 2,500-year celebration of the Persian Empire festivities that same month. The hotel cost $13 million, with 50% of the funding supplied by the Iran National Tourist Organization, 25% supplied by Prince Sadruddin Aga Khan, and the remaining 25% provided by Pan Am's Inter-Continental Hotels division, which also operated the hotel and used it to host Pan Am air crews. It was one of a trio of hotels opened in October 1971, in each of the cities hosting the festivities, with the 160-room Hotel Cyrus Inter-Continental built in Shiraz and the 180-room Hotel Darius Inter-Continental built adjacent to the ruins of Persepolis, to house overflow guests from the Shah's tent city.

During the Iranian Revolution, the hotel housed large numbers of international reporters. It made news in December 1979, when a young Los Angeles radio reporter, Alex Paen, arranged a campaign for American school children to send Christmas cards to the hotel, for the 52 American diplomatic hostages being held by Iranian students at the nearby American Embassy. The cards filled an entire room of the hotel. In 1980, all foreign hotel chain contracts were severed by the Iranian government, and the hotel was renamed the Laleh International Hotel (Laleh means Tulip in Persian).

== Overview ==
The hotel has two restaurants on the 13th floor (a French and a Polynesian) overlooking the city. Additional facilities include a Coffee Shop, an Iranian restaurant — located on the ground floor.
