= Tidewater Middle East Co. =

Iran port operator

- Company type: Public
- Traded as: TSE: TAYD1; ISIN: IRO1TAYD0004
- Industry: Port operator
- Founded: October 1967
- Headquarters: Tehran, Iran
- Website: www.tidewater.ir

Tidewater Middle East Co. (Persian: شرکت تایدواتر خاورمیانه, Shirkat-e Taidvater Xavârmiyanh) is a major port operator in Iran. In June 2011, the U.S. Department of Treasury sanctioned Tidewater for its alleged ownership by the Islamic Revolutionary Guard Corps (IRGC), which it says has used Tidewater for illicit weapons shipments.

In 2016 Mehr Eghtesad bank that is connected to IRGC sold its stake in tidewater to Kosar bank. Finally, in 2018 Kosar bank also sold its share in Tidewater to private sector and the connection of the company with financial firms of Armed forces broke up.

== Port operations ==
Tidewater has operations at seven Iranian ports, including Iran's primary port terminal, Shahid Rajaee Port Complex in Bandar Abbas, through which some 90 percent of Iran's container traffic passes. Besides this, the company has a 5 decades of experience in shipping and marine projects. Tidewater Middle is active in other fields like logistic and international freight forwarding dredging, salvage, information technology, technical services and engineering, investment and education.

== U.S. sanctions ==
On June 23, 2011, the U.S. Treasury Department announced sanctions against Tidewater as well as Iran Air, the flag carrier airline of Iran. Treasury said it was blacklisting Tidewater for its ownership by the IRGC. The U.S. government additionally said that "the Iranian Government has repeatedly used Tidewater-managed ports to export arms or related materiel in violation of United Nations Security Council resolutions." The U.S. listed three documented incidents, most recently a seizure of an IRGC weapons shipments in Nigeria in October 2010. As a result of the sanctions, Maersk, the world's largest container ship operator, ceased all business with Tidewater-managed ports in Iran.

== Situation after the entrance of private sector ==
By starting the privatization process in Iran in 2008, Tidewater Middle East was among the major firms that were chosen by the government to sold to private sector but finally Mehr Eghtesad bank took over the company. Mehr Eghtesad bank that was connected to IRGC sold its stake of tidewater to Kosar bank and Finally in 2018 Kosar bank sold its share in Tidewater to private sector. After this event, the operational and financial situation of the company started to improve as the net profit of the company has jump over 150 percent in 2018-2019.
