= Pars Oil =

Oil refining company

Pars Oil Company Ltd
- Type: Public limited company
- Industry: Oil and gas
- Founded: 1959; 67 years ago
- Headquarters: Tehran, Iran
- Area served: Worldwide
- Products: Petroleum; Natural gas; Motor fuels; Aviation fuels; Petrochemicals
- Services: Service stations
- Number of employees: 3000+
- Website: www.parsoilco.com

Pars Oil Company is an Iranian oil refining company with headquarters in Tehran.

== History ==
Pars Oil Company was established in 1959 as a joint-stock company. In 1962, it was admitted to the Tehran Stock Exchange.

After the Islamic Revolution of 1979, this company was confiscated by the revolutionary government and handed over to the Foundation of the Underprivileged of the Revolution, a group of industries also (industrial resources at the disposal of about 56 families affiliated with the previous regime (under the title of state and government supervision), under the management of institutions and organizations.

In the 1990s, some shares were traded between former shareholders such as Royal Dutch Shell. By the year 2000, Fuad Ray Investment Company, under the supervision of the Imam Khomeini's Order and decree, with Mohammad Reyshahri executive headquarters, as well as some influential figures in intelligence, security, and economy bought more than 48% of the shares of Pars Oil Company.

== Description ==
Ramin Partovi is or was CEO, while Majid Bajelan is or was chairman of the board.

Based onf 2026 data, the company has more than 1,200 employees.

== Products ==
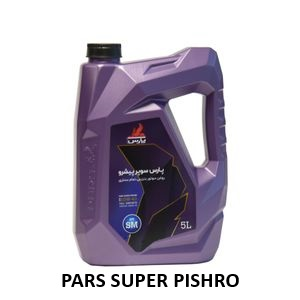

The company's main product are gasoline engine oils, diesel engine oils, automotive gear oils, industrial oils, antifreezes, brake fluids, greases and marine oils.

== Certifications ==
Pars Oil Company has qualified for ISO 9001 from SGS Industrial Services, as well as many other health, safety, and environment certificates including ISO 14001 and OHSAS 18001.

== Sponsorships ==
In July 2019, Football Federation of Iran (FFIRI) signed a contract with Pars Oil Company for the sponsorship of Iran's football referees, including the (male) Pro League, women referees in the Women's League, and futsal league, and received shirts with the company. However, female Pro League referees lodged a complaint against unpaid wages, which led to their dismissal, in violation of the Federation's statute. After the chairman of the Federation's Referees Committee intervened, all of the women were backpaid, but were then terminated and disqualified.

== Export markets ==
Pars Oil Company started to export its products in 1994. The current export markets are India, China, and some African and European countries.

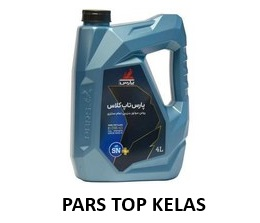

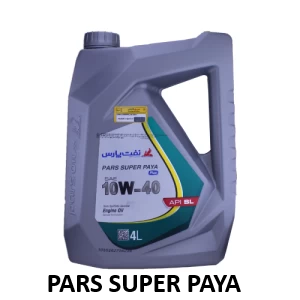

== See also ==
- Industry of Iran
- Privatization in Iran
- List of Iranian companies
- National Iranian Oil Company
