= Tolypers =

Iranian consumer goods company

The Tolypers Company
- Company type: Public; TSE: TOPI1
- Industry: Consumer goods, chemical products, detergents
- Founded: 1971; 55 years ago
- Headquarters: Tehran, Iran
- Area served: Worldwide
- Key people: Reza Mousavian (President) & (CEO)
- Products: Cleaning agents Personal care products Beauty Care Products; Personal Healthcare Products
- Operating income: ▲127 billion IRR (2009)
- Net income: ▲79 billion IRR (2009)
- Total assets: ▲1.47 trillion IRR (2009)
- Number of employees: 1000 (2009)
- Website: tolypers.com

Tolypers (Persian: تولی‌پرس, Tulipers) is a chemical and consumer goods company based in Iran. The company produces laundry detergent under the same name, which is sold in Iran and 17 other countries.

The company also manufactures detergent powder, soaps, shampoos, dishwashing liquids, hand washing liquids, and toothpaste powders. The company was founded in 1971 and is based in Tehran, Iran.

The company has been listed on the Tehran Stock Exchange since 1997.
