= Behran Oil Company =

Iranian oil and gas company

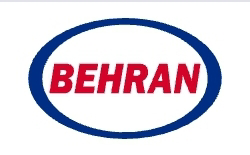

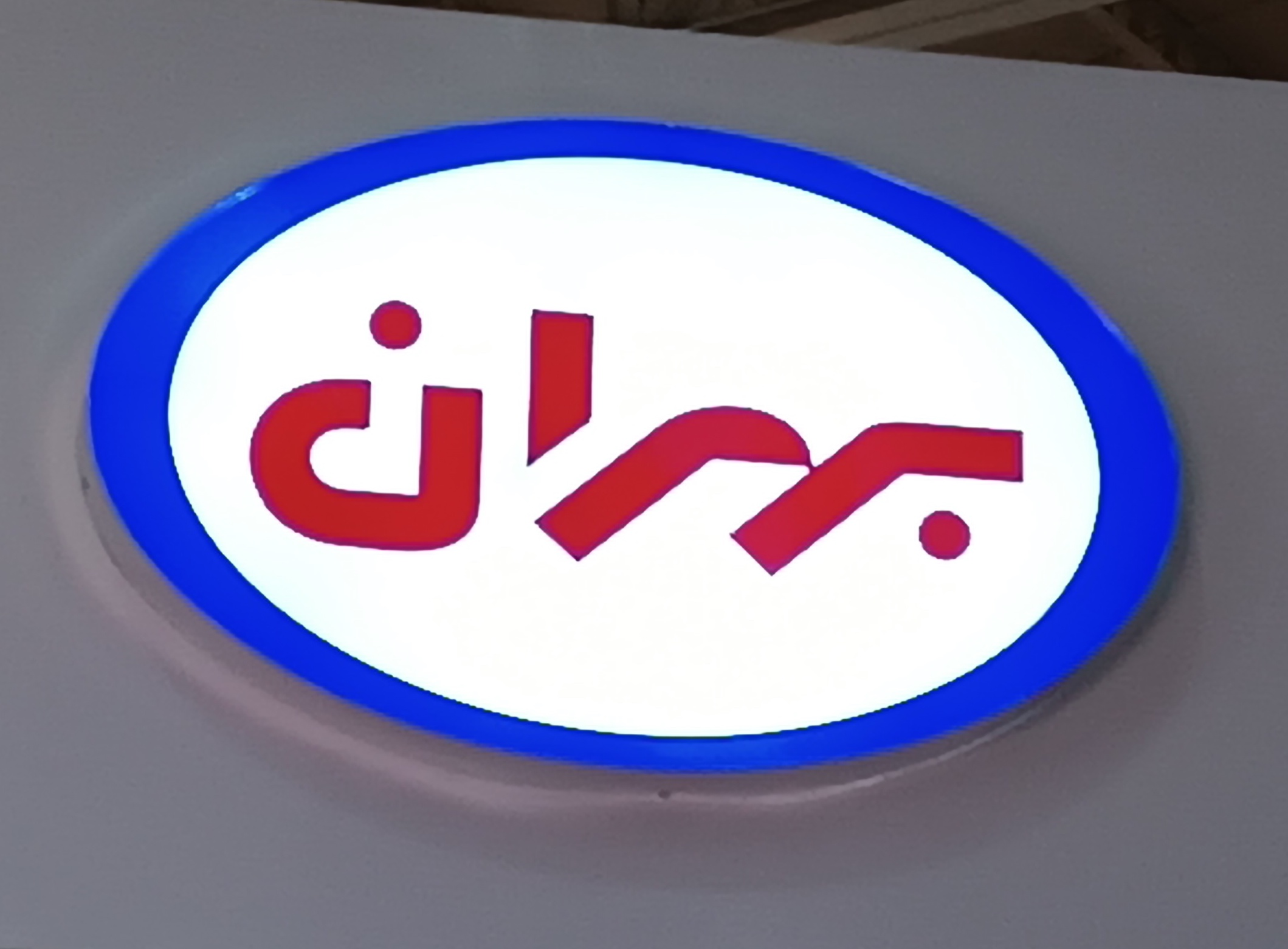
- Company type: Public
- Traded as: TSE: NBEH1; ISIN: IRO1NBEH0009
- Industry: Oil and gas
- Founded: (1963; 63 years ago)
- Headquarters: Tehran, Iran
- Area served: Worldwide
- Key people: Ali Kazemi, Managing Director
- Products: Petroleum; Natural gas; Motor fuels; Aviation fuels; Petrochemicals
- Owner: Mostazafan Foundation
- Number of employees: 1400
- Website: www.behranoil.co

Behran Oil Company (Persian: شرکت نفت بهران, Sherkat-e Naft-e Behrān) is an oil refining company with headquarters in Tehran. Its products are exported to more than 40 countries.

== History and development ==
Behran Oil Company was founded in 1963 as a private joint venture with Exxon Mobil Company in Iran. The first products of the company were just packing and blending engine oils.

The company became independent after the Islamic Revolution. Gradually it was expanded and now the production rate reaches 250,000 tons of base oil for each year, as well as 350,000 tons per year of finished products. In total, the capacity of the company for the production of finished products is more than 500,000 tons per year.

Behran Oil Company increased its commitment in the field of lubricant production technology through investment in research and development. The development of Behran activities resulted in the establishment of a new plant for the production of special lubricants and antifreezes.

== Products ==
The main products of the company are Automotive lubricating oils, Industrial lubricants, Petroleum waxes, Antifreeze – Antiboil and Anticorrosion, Rubber process oils, Fuel additives and Greases.

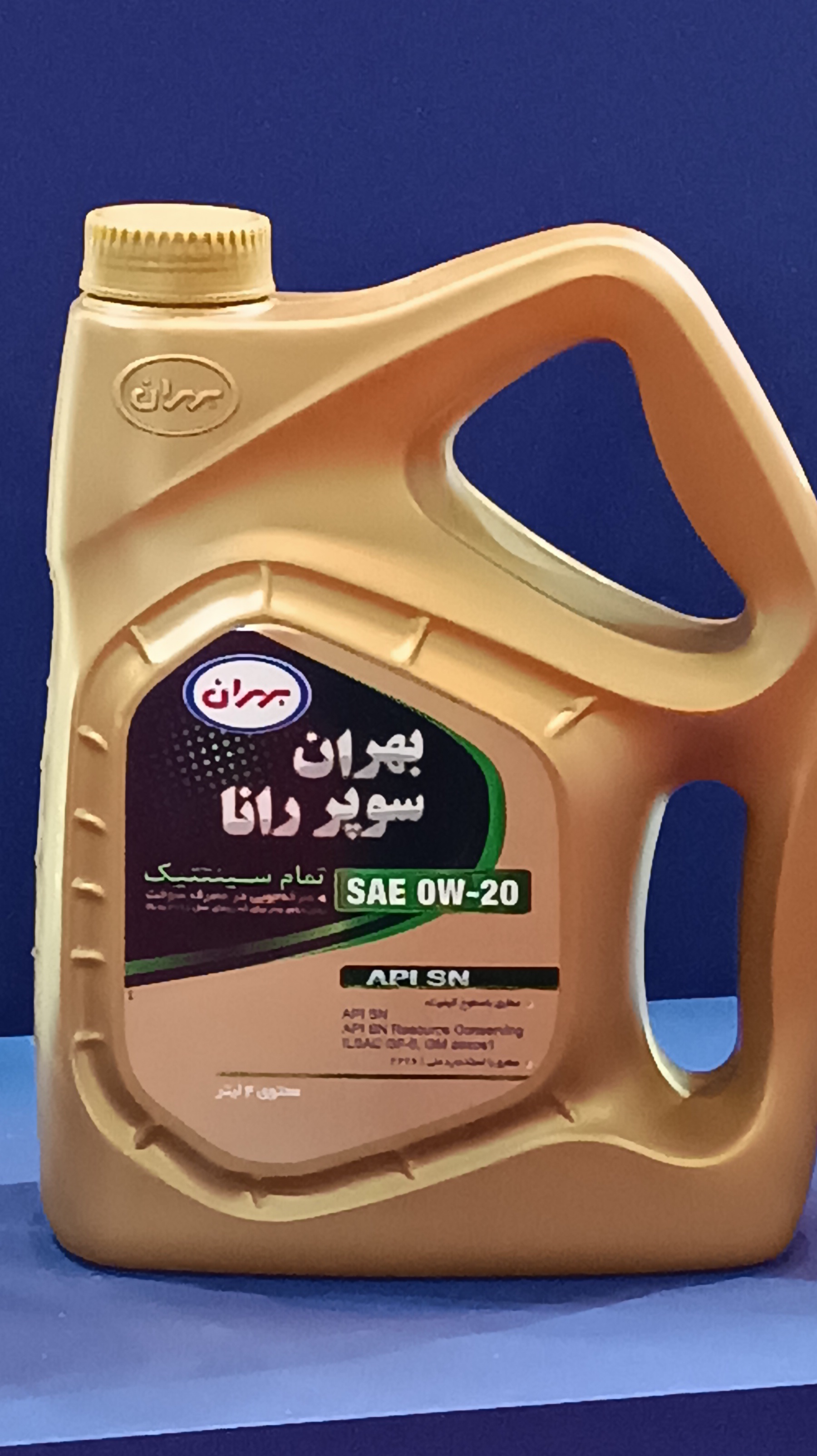
Behran motor oil

== Certifications ==
Behran Oil Company qualified for ISO 9001 from SGS, as well as other health, safety, and environment certificates including ISO 14001 and OHSAS 18001.

== See also ==
- Industry of Iran
- Privatization in Iran
- List of Iranian companies
- National Iranian Oil Company
