= Qarah Tappeh =

Qarah Tappeh or Qareh Tappeh or Qarahtapeh or Qareh Tapeh (Persian: قره‌تپه), also rendered as Qara Tepe or Qara Tappeh, may refer to:

== Afghanistan ==
- Qarah Tappeh, Afghanistan

== Iran ==
=== Ardabil Province ===
- Qareh Tappeh, Ardabil, Iran
- Qarah Tappeh, Namin, Ardabil Province, Iran
- Qarah Tappeh, Nir, Ardabil Province, Iran

=== East Azerbaijan Province ===
- Qareh Tappeh, Marand, East Azerbaijan Province, Iran
- Qarah Tappeh, Meyaneh, East Azerbaijan Province, Iran
- Qareh Tappeh, Shabestar, East Azerbaijan Province, Iran
- Qareh Tappeh, Tabriz, East Azerbaijan Province, Iran
- Qareh Tappeh, Ozomdel-e Jonubi, Varzaqan County, East Azerbaijan Province, Iran
- Qareh Tappeh, Sina, Varzaqan County, East Azerbaijan Province, Iran

=== Golestan Province ===
- Qarah Tappeh, Aqqala, Golestan Province, Iran
- Qarah Tappeh, Torkaman, Golestan Province, Iran

=== Isfahan Province ===
- Qareh Tappeh, Isfahan, a village in Tiran and Karvan County

=== Kerman Province ===
- Qarah Tappeh, Kerman
- Qarah Tappeh-ye Ashayiri-ye Do, Kerman Province

=== Kermanshah Province ===
- Qarah Tappeh, Kermanshah
- Qarah Tappeh, Sonqor, Kermanshah Province

=== Markazi Province ===
- Qarah Tappeh, Khondab, Markazi Province, Iran
- Qarah Tappeh, Shazand, Markazi Province, Iran

=== Mazandaran Province ===
- Qarah Tappeh, Mazandaran, a village in Behshahr County

=== Tehran Province ===
- Qarah Tappeh, Tehran, Iran

=== West Azerbaijan Province ===
- Qarah Tappeh, Chaypareh, West Azerbaijan Province, Iran
- Qarah Tappeh, Khoy, West Azerbaijan Province, Iran
- Qarah Tappeh, Maku, West Azerbaijan Province, Iran
- Qareh Tappeh, Miandoab, West Azerbaijan Province, Iran
- Qarah Tappeh, Shahin Dezh, West Azerbaijan Province, Iran
- Qarah Tappeh, Salmas, West Azerbaijan Province, Iran

=== Zanjan Province ===
- Qarah Tappeh, Abhar, Zanjan Province
- Qarah Tappeh, Zanjan, Zanjan Province
- Qarah Tappeh, Qareh Poshtelu, Zanjan County, Zanjan Province
- Qarah Tappeh-ye Sabalan, Iran

== Iraq ==
- Qara Tapa, Iraq, Diyala Governorate

== See also ==
- Karatepe (disambiguation)
