= Bejan (disambiguation) =

Bejan was formerly a term for freshmen, or undergraduates of the first year in the Scottish universities.

Bejan may also refer to:

== Places ==
- Bejan, a village in Șoimuș Commune, Hunedoara County, Romania
- Laleh Bejan, a village in Iran

== People ==
- Adrian Bejan, Romanian-American professor
- Alexandru Bejan, Moldovan footballer
- Bejan Daruwalla, Indian writer
- Bejan Matur, Kurdish poet and writer
- Bob Bejan, American executive
- Cristina A. Bejan, Romanian–American writer
- Florin Bejan, Romanian footballer
- Petre Bejan, Romanian engineer
- Sergiu Bejan, Romanian rower
- Teresa Bejan, American political theorist

== Other uses ==
- Bejan number, number used in thermodynamics and fluid mechanics

== See also ==
- Beejan, a given name and surname
- Bijan, a Persian given name
- Bizhaem, a village in Iran. sometimes transliterated as Bījān
