= Samsam =

Samsam or SamSam may refer to:

== Media ==
- SamSam, French-Belgian children's television program
  - SamSam (film), a 2019 film based on the program

== Name ==
- Samsam-ud-Daula (disambiguation), medieval Perso-Arabic titular name

== People ==
- Sinan ibn Ulayyan, 11th-century Bedouin leader, also known as Samsam al-Dawla
- Samsam ud Daula Shah Nawaz Khan (1700-1758), Indian Mughal courtier and historian
- Samsam ol-Saltaneh, Iranian Prime Minister and leader of the Iranian Constitutional Revolution
- Samsam Gullas, Filipino politician serving as the mayor of Talisay

== Places ==
- Samsam Kandi, also known simply as Samsam, a village in Iran
- Samsami, a city in Iran

== Other uses ==
- SamSam, a strain of malware
- Kelantan–Pattani Malay, also known as Samsam Malay, an Austronesian language of the Malayic subfamily spoken in the southernmost provinces of Thailand

== See also ==
- "A Ram Sam Sam", popular Moroccan children's song
- Sam (disambiguation)
