= Mirza Ali Kandi =

Mirza Ali Kandi ميرزاعلي كندي
- Village
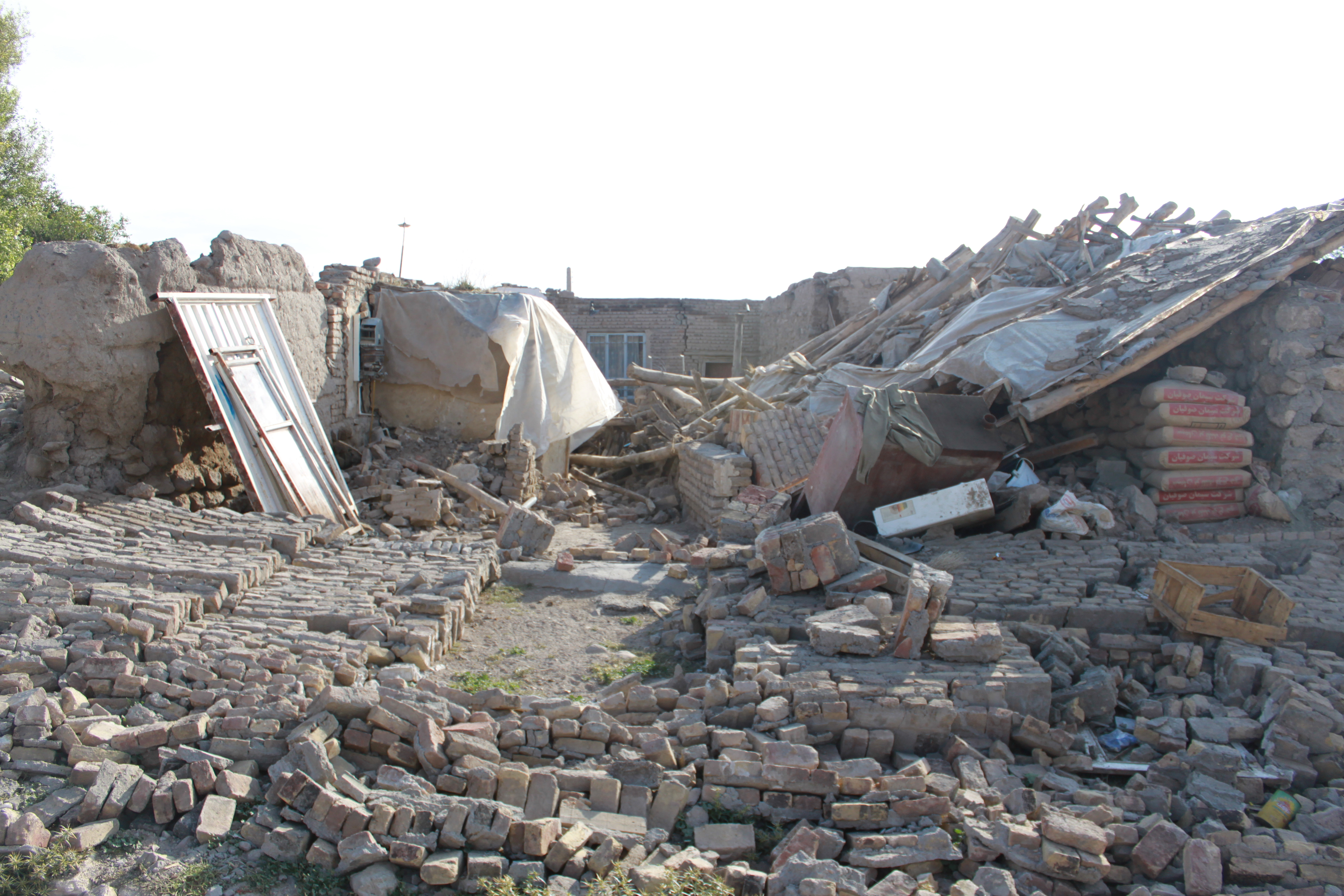
- damage from the 2012 East Azerbaijan earthquakes.

- Location within Iran
- Coordinates: 38°27′03″N 46°39′43″E
- Country: Iran
- Province: East Azerbaijan
- County: Varzaqan
- Bakhsh: Central
- Rural District: Ozomdel-e Jonubi

Population (2006)
  - Total: 271
- Time zone: UTC+3:30 (IRST)
  - Summer (DST): UTC+4:30 (IRDT)

Mirza Ali Kandi (Persian: ميرزاعلي كندي, also Romanized as Mīrzā ‘Alī Kandī; also known as Marzā ‘Alī Kandī, Merzā ‘Alī Kandī, Mizārli Kand, Mizārli Kandi, and Mizarli-Kendy) is a village in Ozomdel-e Jonubi Rural District, in the Central District of Varzaqan County, East Azerbaijan Province, Iran. At the 2006 census, its population was 271, in 57 families.

The village was damaged in the 2012 East Azerbaijan earthquakes.
