= Heybat Beyglu =

Heybat Beyglu هيبت بيگلو
- Village
- Location within Iran
- Coordinates: 38°26′00″N 46°39′00″E
- Country: Iran
- Province: East Azerbaijan
- County: Varzaqan
- Bakhsh: Central
- Rural District: Ozomdel-e Jonubi

Population (2006)
  - Total: 130
- Time zone: UTC+3:30 (IRST)
  - Summer (DST): UTC+4:30 (IRDT)

Heybat Beyglu (Persian: هيبت بيگلو, also Romanized as Heybat Beyglū; also known as Heibat Bakloo, Heybat Beglū, Heybat Beyg, Heybat Beyk, Kheibashbai, Kheybashbay, and Kheyr Bāsh Beyk) is a village in Ozomdel-e Jonubi Rural District, in the Central District of Varzaqan County, East Azerbaijan Province, Iran. At the 2006 census, its population was 130, in 28 families.
