= Zaghanabad =

Zaghanabad زغن اباد
- Village
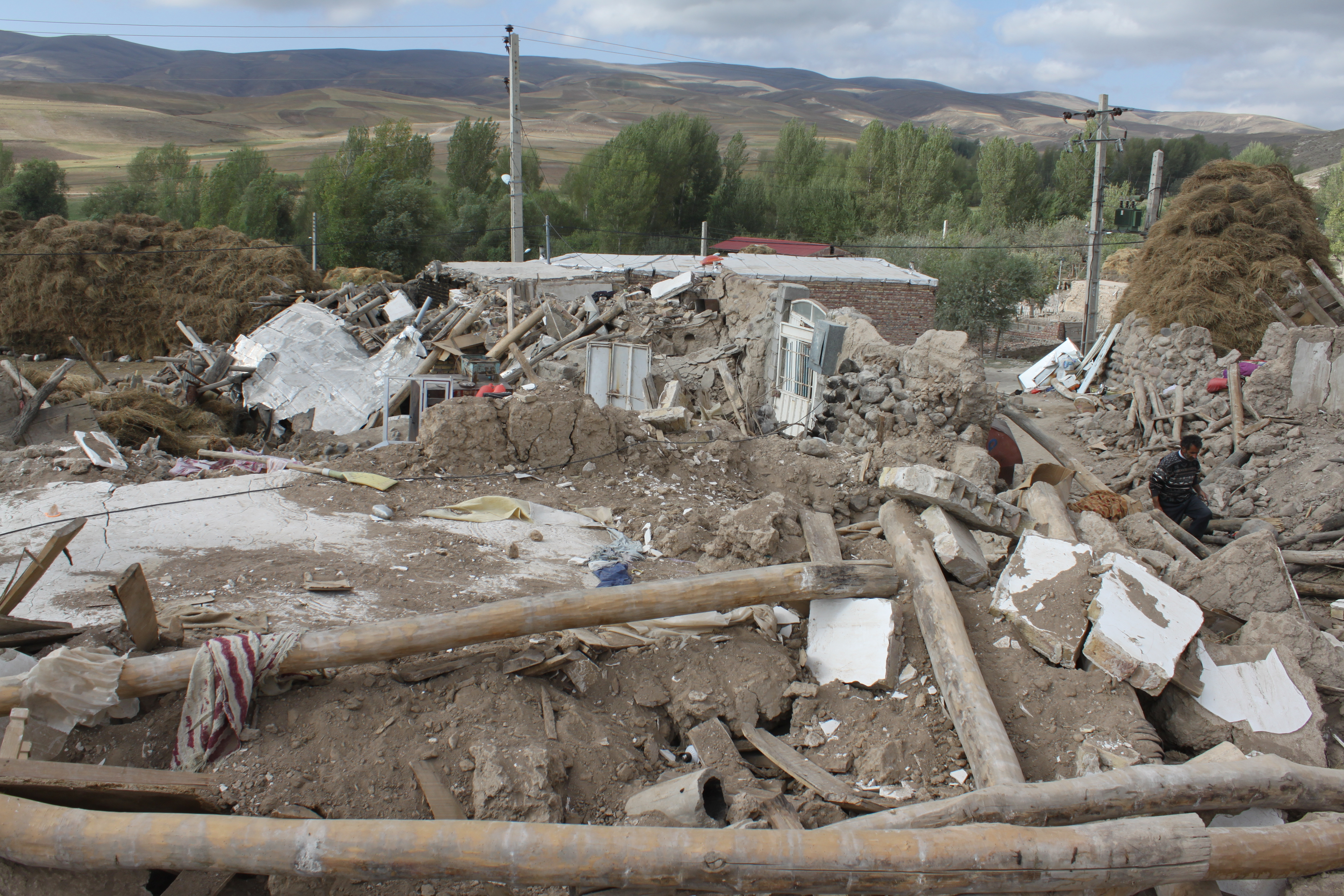
- Damage from the 2012 earthquakes.

- Location within Iran
- Coordinates: 38°24′53″N 46°40′15″E
- Country: Iran
- Province: East Azerbaijan
- County: Varzaqan
- Bakhsh: Central
- Rural District: Ozomdel-e Jonubi

Population (2006)
  - Total: 347
- Time zone: UTC+3:30 (IRST)
  - Summer (DST): UTC+4:30 (IRDT)

Zaghanabad (Persian: زغن اباد, also Romanized as Zaghanābād; also known as Ziganab and Zīqānāb) is a village in Ozomdel-e Jonubi Rural District, in the Central District of Varzaqan County, East Azerbaijan Province, Iran. At the 2006 census, its population was 347, in 61 families. The village was damaged in the 2012 East Azerbaijan earthquakes.
