= Vanestan, East Azerbaijan =

Vanestan ونستان
- Village
- Location within Iran
- Coordinates: 38°43′22″N 46°34′21″E
- Country: Iran
- Province: East Azerbaijan
- County: Varzaqan
- Bakhsh: Central
- Rural District: Ozomdel-e Jonubi

Population (2006)
  - Total: 245
- Time zone: UTC+3:30 (IRST)
  - Summer (DST): UTC+4:30 (IRDT)

Vanestan (Persian: ونستان, also Romanized as Vanestān; also known as Vanistan) is a village in Ozomdel-e Jonubi Rural District, in the Central District of Varzaqan County, East Azerbaijan Province, Iran. At the 2006 census, its population was 245, in 58 families.
