= Sari Chaman =

Sari Chaman ساري چمن
- Village
- Location within Iran
- Coordinates: 38°39′19″N 46°36′30″E
- Country: Iran
- Province: East Azerbaijan
- County: Varzaqan
- Bakhsh: Central
- Rural District: Bakrabad

Population (2006)
  - Total: 93
- Time zone: UTC+3:30 (IRST)
  - Summer (DST): UTC+4:30 (IRDT)

Sari Chaman (Persian: ساري چمن, also Romanized as Sārī Chaman; also known as Sar Chīmeh, Sar-e-Chamā, Sere-Chima, and Ser-i-Chima) is a village in Bakrabad Rural District, in the Central District of Varzaqan County, East Azerbaijan Province, Iran. At the 2006 census, its population was 93, in 18 families.
