= Day Mamaq =

Day Mamaq دايممق
- Village
- Location within Iran
- Coordinates: 38°38′33″N 46°38′32″E
- Country: Iran
- Province: East Azerbaijan
- County: Varzaqan
- Bakhsh: Central
- Rural District: Bakrabad

Population (2006)
  - Total: 52
- Time zone: UTC+3:30 (IRST)
  - Summer (DST): UTC+4:30 (IRDT)

Day Mamaq (Persian: دايممق, also Romanized as Dāy Mamaq and Dāymamaq; also known as Dā’ī Māmā, Daymana, and Dāymaq) is a village in Bakrabad Rural District, in the Central District of Varzaqan County, East Azerbaijan Province, Iran. At the 2006 census, its population was 52, in 13 families.
