= Khvoindizaj =

Khvoindizaj خوين ديزج
- Village
- Location within Iran
- Coordinates: 38°38′14″N 46°48′28″E
- Country: Iran
- Province: East Azerbaijan
- County: Varzaqan
- Bakhsh: Central
- Rural District: Ozomdel-e Shomali

Population (2006)
  - Total: 275
- Time zone: UTC+3:30 (IRST)
  - Summer (DST): UTC+4:30 (IRDT)

Khvoindizaj (Persian: خوين ديزج, also Romanized as Khvoīndīzaj; also known as Khoi Dīzeh, Khovidizaj, Khow’īn Dīzaj, Khowyendīzaj, Khoy-diz, and Khvoy Dīzéh) is a village in Ozomdel-e Shomali Rural District, in the Central District of Varzaqan County, East Azerbaijan Province, Iran. At the 2006 census, its population was 275, in 65 families.
