= Sarpa Daraq =

Sarpa Daraq سرپادرق
- Village
- Location within Iran
- Coordinates: 38°39′07″N 46°37′38″E
- Country: Iran
- Province: East Azerbaijan
- County: Varzaqan
- Bakhsh: Central
- Rural District: Bakrabad

Population (2006)
  - Total: 41
- Time zone: UTC+3:30 (IRST)
  - Summer (DST): UTC+4:30 (IRDT)

Sarpa Daraq (Persian: سرپادرق, also Romanized as Sarpā Daraq; also known as Sarpa-Dara, Sarpā Dareh, Sarpa Darreh, Sarpeh Daraq and Sūbeh Daraq) is a village in Bakrabad Rural District, in the Central District of Varzaqan County, East Azerbaijan Province, Iran. At the 2006 census, its population was 41, in 11 families.
