= Kalijan =

Kalijan كاليجان
- Village
- Location within Iran
- Coordinates: 38°38′36″N 46°29′25″E
- Country: Iran
- Province: East Azerbaijan
- County: Varzaqan
- Bakhsh: Central
- Rural District: Sina

Population (2006)
  - Total: 75
- Time zone: UTC+3:30 (IRST)
  - Summer (DST): UTC+4:30 (IRDT)

Kalijan (Persian: كاليجان, also Romanized as Kalījān; also known as Kaladzha, Kāljān, Ohālja, and Ūhāljeh) is a village in Sina Rural District, in the Central District of Varzaqan County, East Azerbaijan Province, Iran. At the 2006 census, its population was 75, in 15 families.

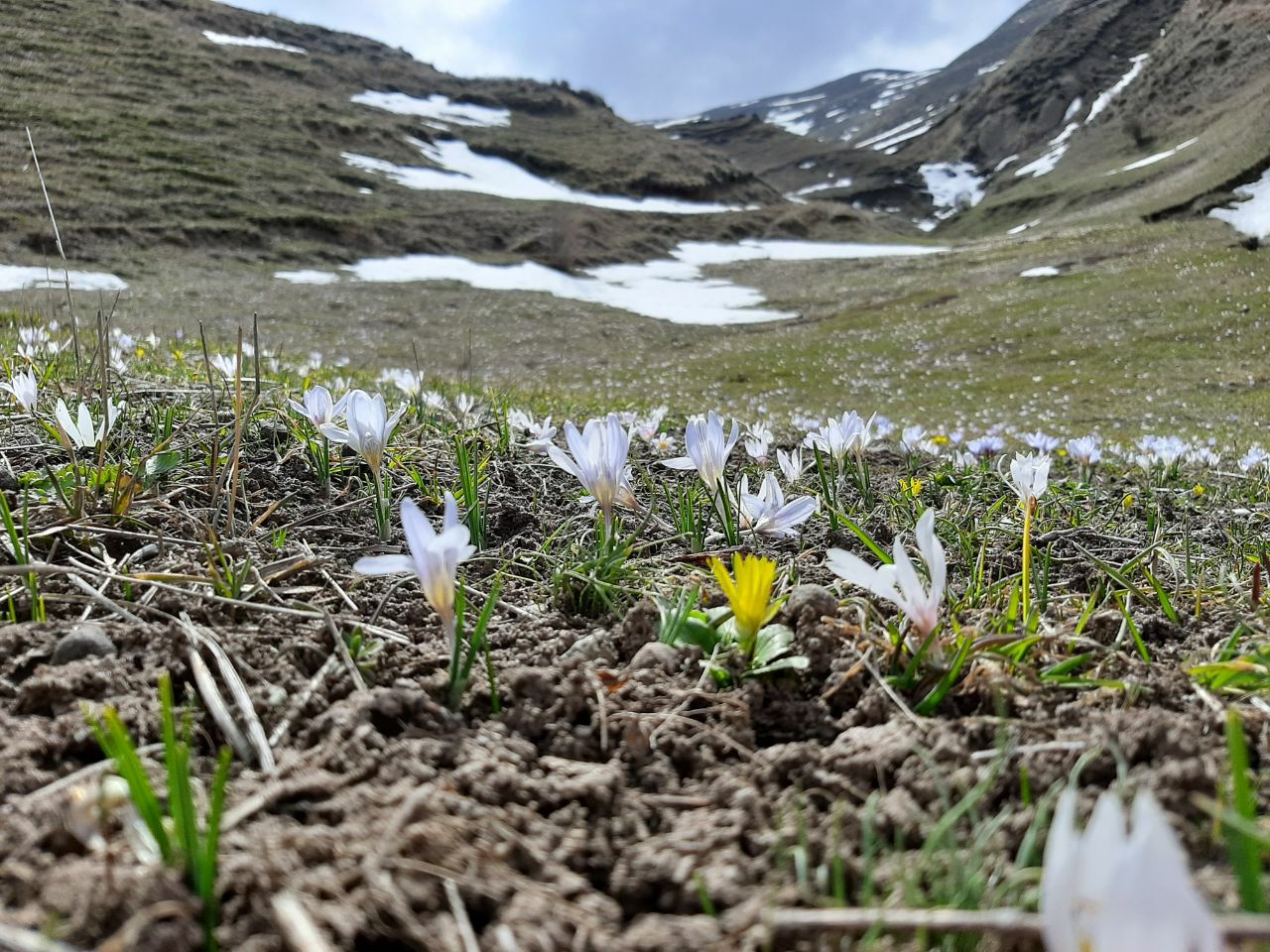
Around the village

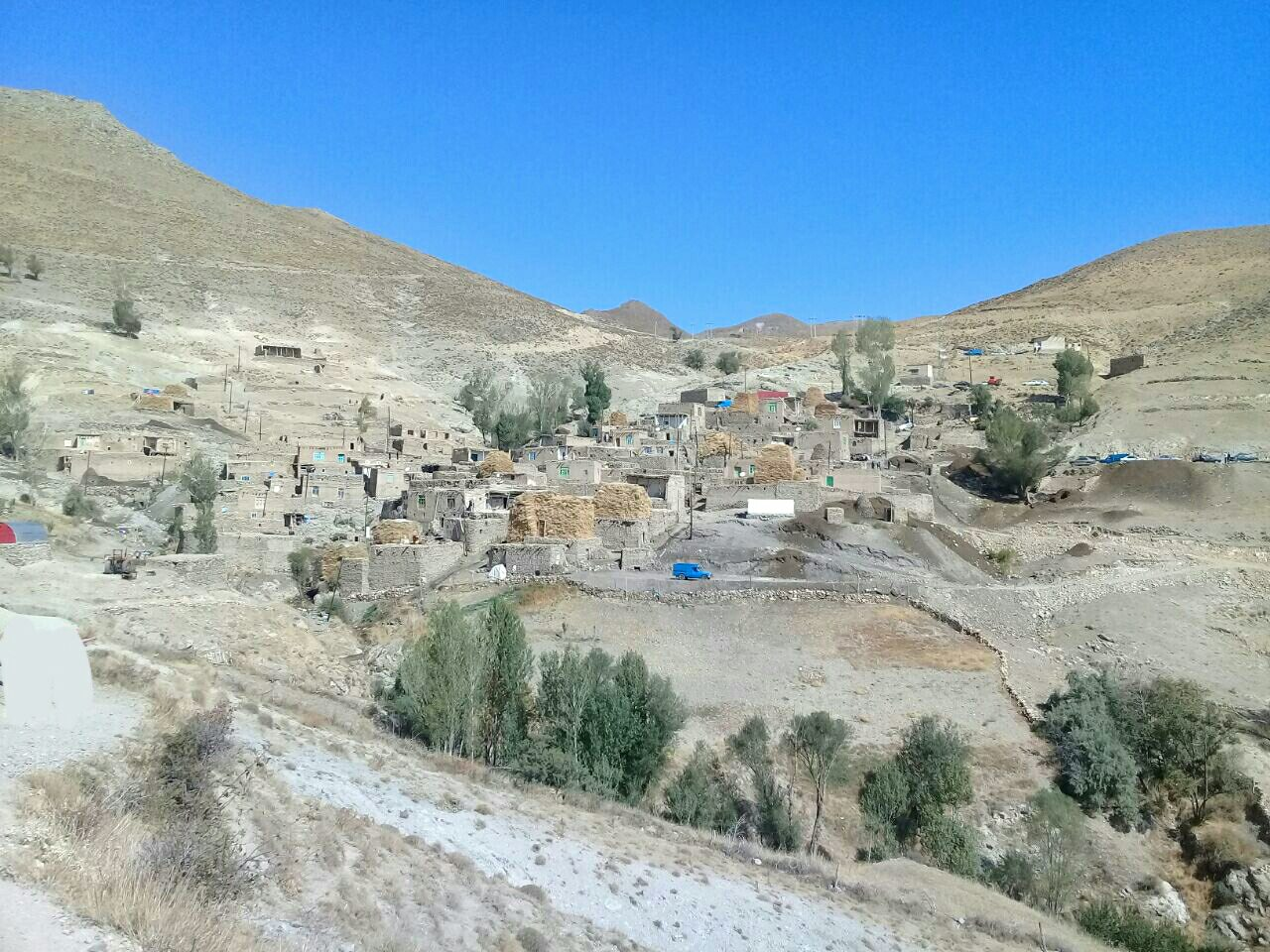
Village houses

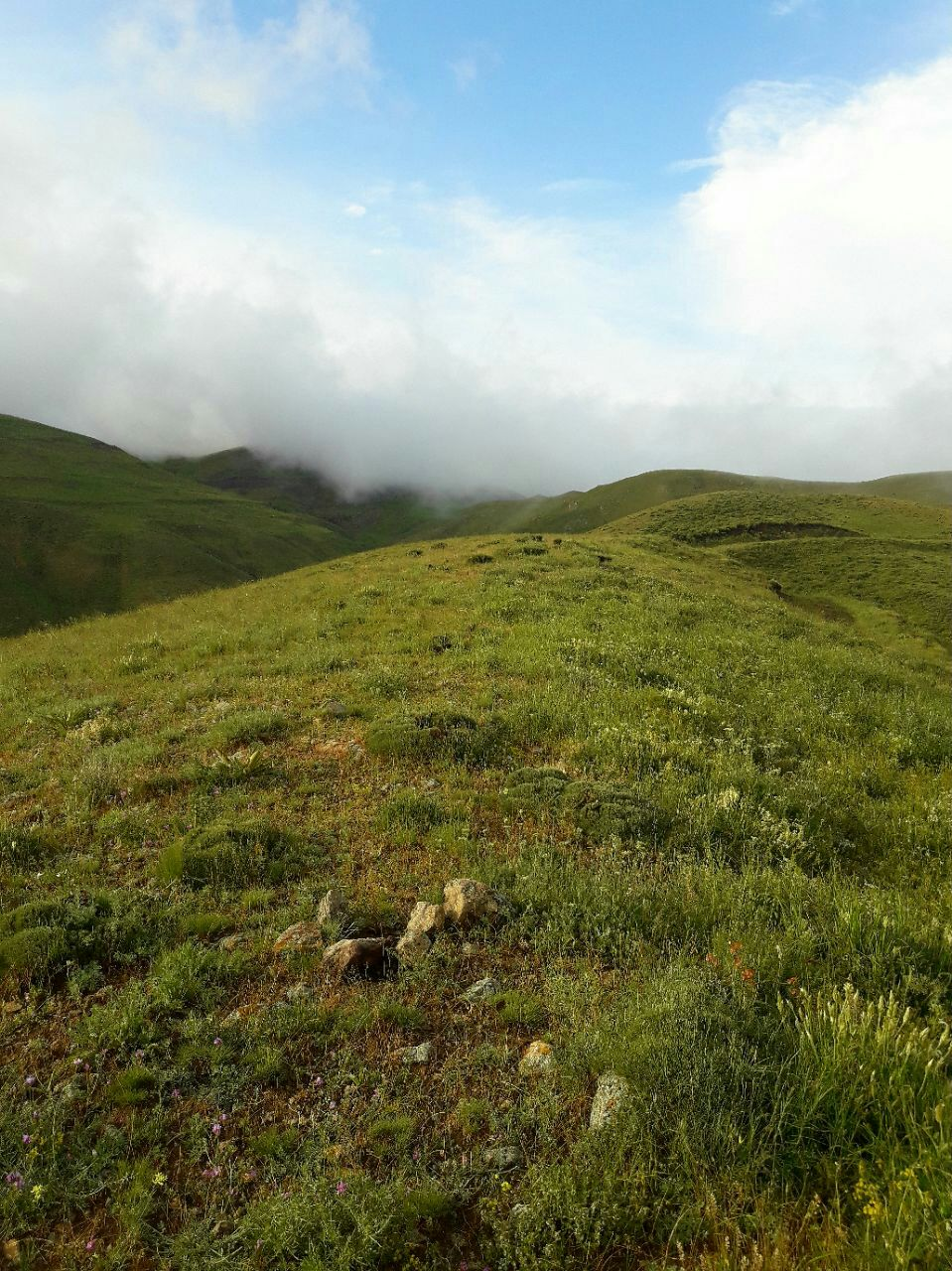
Green field around the village

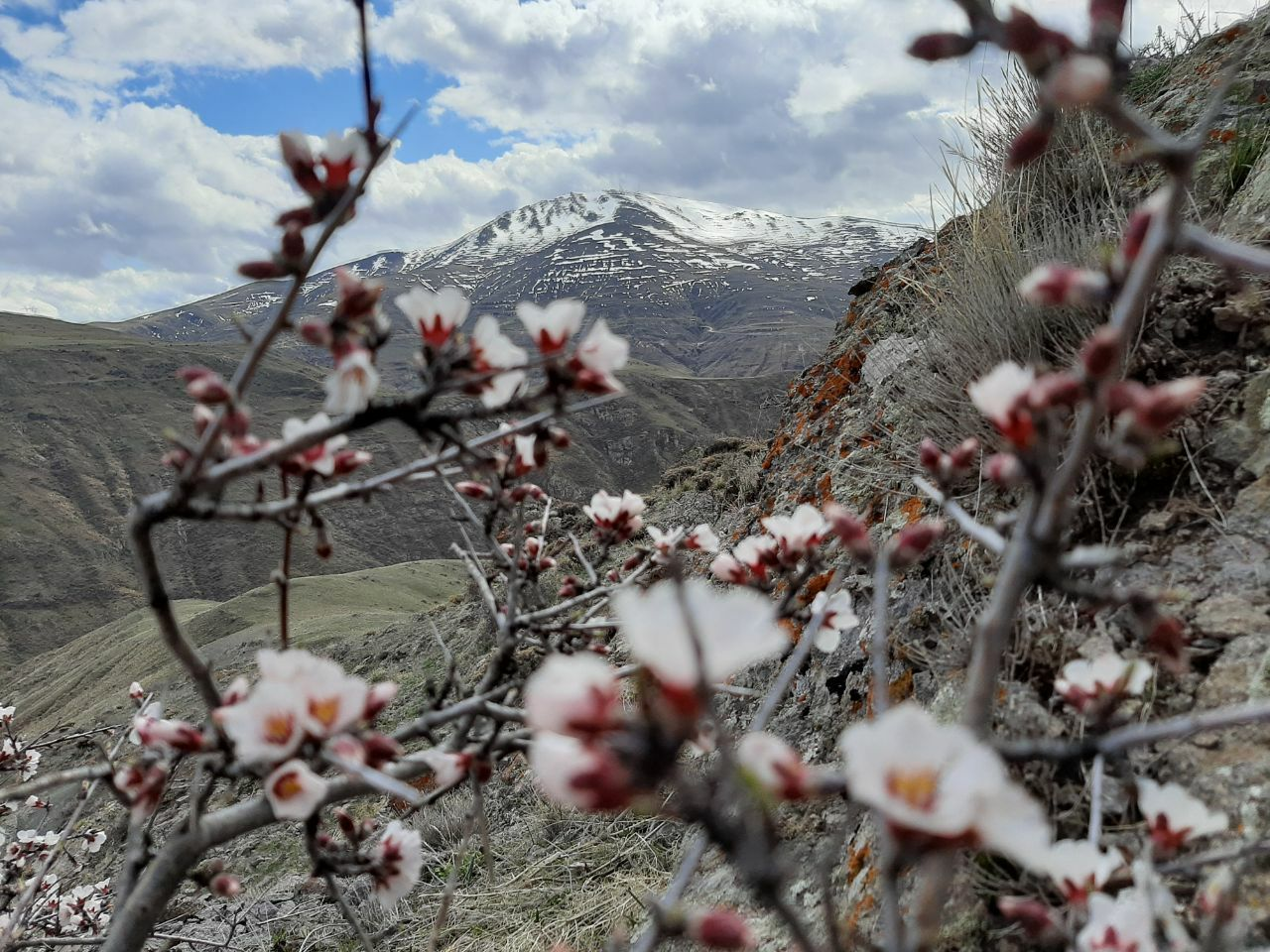
Around the village
