= Kheyr ol Din =

Kheyr ol Din خيرالدين
- Village
- Location within Iran
- Coordinates: 38°28′38″N 46°37′43″E
- Country: Iran
- Province: East Azerbaijan
- County: Varzaqan
- Bakhsh: Central
- Rural District: Ozomdel-e Jonubi

Population (2006)
  - Total: 86
- Time zone: UTC+3:30 (IRST)
  - Summer (DST): UTC+4:30 (IRDT)

Kheyr ol Din (Persian: خيرالدين, also Romanized as Kheyr ol Dīn, Kheyr od Dīn, Kheiroddin, and Kheyr ad Dīn; also known as Kheyradyn and Kheīradim) is a village in Ozomdel-e Jonubi Rural District, in the Central District of Varzaqan County, East Azerbaijan Province, Iran. At the 2006 census, its population was 86, in 17 families.
