= Meshk-e Anbar =

Meshk-e Anbar مشك عنبر
- Village
- Location within Iran
- Coordinates: 38°26′06″N 46°29′10″E
- Country: Iran
- Province: East Azerbaijan
- County: Varzaqan
- Bakhsh: Central
- Rural District: Sina

Population (2006)
  - Total: 245
- Time zone: UTC+3:30 (IRST)
  - Summer (DST): UTC+4:30 (IRDT)

Meshk-e Anbar (Persian: مشك عنبر, also Romanized as Meshk-e ‘Anbar, Meshk‘anbar, and Moshk ‘Anbar; also known as Meshg ‘Anbar, Meshg ‘Anbar Mīāneh, Moshg Anbar, and Mushkyambar) is a village in Sina Rural District, in the Central District of Varzaqan County, East Azerbaijan Province, Iran. At the 2006 census, its population was 245, in 50 families.
