= Chelanab =

Chelanab چلناب
- Village
- Location within Iran
- Coordinates: 38°36′59″N 46°35′04″E
- Country: Iran
- Province: East Azerbaijan
- County: Varzaqan
- Bakhsh: Central
- Rural District: Ozomdel-e Jonubi

Population (2006)
  - Total: 200
- Time zone: UTC+3:30 (IRST)
  - Summer (DST): UTC+4:30 (IRDT)

Chelanab (Persian: چلناب, also Romanized as Chelanāb, Chelānāb, Chalnab, and Chelnāb; also known as Chanbālyākh, Chelleh Nāb, Chinaliakh, and Chinalyakh) is a village in Ozomdel-e Jonubi Rural District, in the Central District of Varzaqan County, East Azerbaijan Province, Iran. At the 2006 census, its population was 200, in 44 families.
