= Hizeh Jan =

Hizeh Jan هيزه جان
- Village
- Location within Iran
- Coordinates: 38°37′42″N 46°30′16″E
- Country: Iran
- Province: East Azerbaijan
- County: Varzaqan
- Bakhsh: Central
- Rural District: Sina

Population (2006)
  - Total: 56
- Time zone: UTC+3:30 (IRST)
  - Summer (DST): UTC+4:30 (IRDT)

Hizeh Jan (Persian: هيزه جان, also Romanized as Hīzeh Jān; also known as Henreh Jān) is a village in Sina Rural District, in the Central District of Varzaqan County, East Azerbaijan Province, Iran. At the 2006 census, its population was 56, in 12 families.
