= Gol Anbar =

Gol Anbar گل عنبر
- Village
- Location within Iran
- Coordinates: 38°25′56″N 46°38′55″E
- Country: Iran
- Province: East Azerbaijan
- County: Varzaqan
- Bakhsh: Central
- Rural District: Ozomdel-e Jonubi

Population (2006)
  - Total: 214
- Time zone: UTC+3:30 (IRST)
  - Summer (DST): UTC+4:30 (IRDT)

Gol Anbar (Persian: گل عنبر, also Romanized as Gol ‘Anbar; also known as Galanbar, Gol Anbareh, Kalanbar, Kolambar, Kolanbar, Kuliambar, and Kyulyambar) is a village in Ozomdel-e Jonubi Rural District, in the Central District of Varzaqan County, East Azerbaijan Province, Iran. At the 2006 census, its population was 214, in 41 families.
