= Khvoy Narud =

Khvoy Narud خوينرود
- Village
- Location within Iran
- Coordinates: 38°42′16″N 46°37′59″E
- Country: Iran
- Province: East Azerbaijan
- County: Varzaqan
- Bakhsh: Central
- Rural District: Bakrabad

Population (2006)
  - Total: 56
- Time zone: UTC+3:30 (IRST)
  - Summer (DST): UTC+4:30 (IRDT)

Khvoy Narud (Persian: خوينرود, also Romanized as Khvoy Narūd and Khūynarūd) is a village in Bakrabad Rural District, in the Central District of Varzaqan County, East Azerbaijan Province, Iran. At the 2006 census, its population was 56, in 14 families.
