= Sheykh Malu =

Sheykhomlu شيخملو
- Village
- Location within Iran
- Coordinates: 38°26′33″N 46°38′09″E
- Country: Iran
- Province: East Azerbaijan
- County: Varzaqan
- Bakhsh: Central
- Rural District: Ozomdel-e Jonubi

Population (2006)
  - Total: 253
- Time zone: UTC+3:30 (IRST)
  - Summer (DST): UTC+4:30 (IRDT)

Sheykh Malu (Persian: شيخملو, also Romanized as Sheykh Malū and Sheikh Maloo; also known as Shaikh ‘Amli, Shekhamlū, Shekhemlū, Sheykhamlū, and Shikhamli) is a village in Ozomdel-e Jonubi Rural District, in the Central District of Varzaqan County, East Azerbaijan Province, Iran. At the 2006 census, its population was 253, in 51 families.
