= Bejushan =

Bejushan بجوشن
- Village
- Location within Iran
- Coordinates: 38°32′23″N 46°45′17″E
- Country: Iran
- Province: East Azerbaijan
- County: Varzaqan
- Bakhsh: Central
- Rural District: Ozomdel-e Shomali

Population (2006)
  - Total: 83
- Time zone: UTC+3:30 (IRST)
  - Summer (DST): UTC+4:30 (IRDT)

Bejushan (Persian: بجوشن, also Romanized as Bejowshān and Bejūshan; also known as Bajooshin, Bajūshīn, Bedzheushan, Bejowshīn, and Bejūshīn) is a village in Ozomdel-e Shomali Rural District, in the Central District of Varzaqan County, East Azerbaijan Province, Iran. At the 2006 census, its population was 83, in 18 families.
