= Khalaf Ansar =

Khalaf Ansar خلف انصار
- Village
- Location within Iran
- Coordinates: 38°25′14″N 46°33′10″E
- Country: Iran
- Province: East Azerbaijan
- County: Varzaqan
- Bakhsh: Central
- Rural District: Ozomdel-e Jonubi

Population (2006)
  - Total: 50
- Time zone: UTC+3:30 (IRST)
  - Summer (DST): UTC+4:30 (IRDT)

Khalaf Ansar (Persian: خلف انصار, also Romanized as Khalaf Anşār; also known as Khalaf ol Anşār, Khalīf Anşār, Khalīfeh Anşār, Khānvalāsar, and Khanvalsar) is a village in Ozomdel-e Jonubi Rural District, in the Central District of Varzaqan County, East Azerbaijan Province, Iran. At the 2006 census, its population was 50, in 7 families.
