= Bahr-e Beyg =

Bahr-e Beyg بهربيگ
- Village
- Location within Iran
- Coordinates: 38°32′34″N 46°28′43″E
- Country: Iran
- Province: East Azerbaijan
- County: Varzaqan
- Bakhsh: Central
- Rural District: Sina

Population (2006)
  - Total: 108
- Time zone: UTC+3:30 (IRST)
  - Summer (DST): UTC+4:30 (IRDT)

Bahr-e Beyg (Persian: بهربيگ, also Romanized as Baḩr-e Beyg, Baḩr Beyg, and Bahr Beyg; also known as Bagribāi, Bagri-Bay, Bahr Beik, Bahr Beyk, and Bāqer Beyg) is a village in Sina Rural District, in the Central District of Varzaqan County, East Azerbaijan Province, Iran. At the 2006 census, its population was 108, in 22 families.
