= Farkharan =

Parkharan پارخاران
- Village
- Location within Iran
- Coordinates: 38°31′55″N 46°29′12″E
- Country: Iran
- Province: East Azerbaijan
- County: Varzaqan
- Bakhsh: Central
- Rural District: Sina

Population (2006)
  - Total: 341
- Time zone: UTC+3:30 (IRST)
  - Summer (DST): UTC+4:30 (IRDT)

Parkharan (Persian: پارخاران, also Romanized as Farkharān and Parrokhran; also known as Parkhazān, Kārkharān, and Pārkhārān) is a village in Sina Rural District, in the Central District of Varzaqan County, East Azerbaijan Province, Iran. At the 2006 census, its population was 341, in 66 families.
