= Bur Malek =

Bur Malek بورملك
- Village
- Location within Iran
- Coordinates: 38°37′33″N 46°40′58″E
- Country: Iran
- Province: East Azerbaijan
- County: Varzaqan
- Bakhsh: Central
- Rural District: Bakrabad

Population (2006)
  - Total: 84
- Time zone: UTC+3:30 (IRST)
  - Summer (DST): UTC+4:30 (IRDT)

Bur Malek (Persian: بورملك, also Romanized as Būr Malek and Būr Molk; also known as Barmluk, Bār Molūk, Barmul’k, Būrī Molk, and Pūr Malek) is a village in Bakrabad Rural District, in the Central District of Varzaqan County, East Azerbaijan Province, Iran. At the 2006 census, its population was 84, in 21 families.
