= Goshayesh =

Goshayesh (Persian: گشايش) may refer to:

- Goshayesh, Hashtrud
- Goshayesh, Maragheh
- Goshayesh, Varzaqan
