= Aqa Baba Sank =

Village in East Azerbaijan province, Iran

Aqa Baba Sank Persian: اقاباباسنك
- Village
- Location within Iran
- Coordinates: 38°37′36″N 46°45′51″E
- Country: Iran
- Province: East Azerbaijan
- County: Varzaqan
- District: Central
- Rural District: Ozomdel-e Shomali

Population (2016)
  - Total: 358
- Time zone: UTC+3:30 (IRST)

Aqa Baba Sank (Persian: اقاباباسنك) (Note: Also romanized as Āqā Bābā Sank; also known as Āqā Bābā Sang and Āqā Bābāy Sang) is a village in Ozomdel-e Shomali Rural District of the Central District in Varzaqan County, (Note: Formerly Arsbaran County) East Azerbaijan province, Iran.

== Demographics ==
=== Population ===
At the time of the 2006 National Census, the village's population was 487 in 103 households. The following census in 2011 counted 431 people in 112 households. The 2016 census measured the population of the village as 358 people in 116 households.
