= Vardin, Varzaqan =

Village in East Azerbaijan province, Iran

Vardin Persian: وردين
- Village
- Location within Iran
- Coordinates: 38°31′10″N 46°31′06″E
- Country: Iran
- Province: East Azerbaijan
- County: Varzaqan
- District: Central
- Rural District: Sina

Population (2016)
  - Total: 387
- Time zone: UTC+3:30 (IRST)

Vardin (Persian: وردين) (Note: Also romanized as Vardīn and Verdin; also known as Dardīn) is a village in Sina Rural District of the Central District in Varzaqan County, (Note: Formerly Arsbaran County) East Azerbaijan province, Iran.

== Demographics ==
=== Population ===
At the time of the 2006 National Census, the village's population was 496 in 98 households. The following census in 2011 counted 445 people in 119 households. The 2016 census measured the population of the village as 387 in 122 households.
