= Alaviq =

Alaviq (Persian: علويق) may refer to:

- Alaviq, Kaleybar
- Alaviq, Varzaqan
