= Aqa Baba-ye Faramarzi =

Village in East Azerbaijan province, Iran

Aqa Baba-ye Faramarzi Persian: آقابابافرامرزی
- Village
- Location within Iran
- Coordinates: 38°31′24″N 46°32′49″E
- Country: Iran
- Province: East Azerbaijan
- County: Varzaqan
- District: Central
- Rural District: Sina

Population (2016)
  - Total: 247
- Time zone: UTC+3:30 (IRST)

Aqa Baba-ye Faramarzi (Persian: آقابابافرامرزی) (Note: Also romanized as Āqā Bābā-ye Farāmarzī and Āqā Bābā-ye Frāmarzī) is a village in, and the capital of, Sina Rural District in the Central District of Varzaqan County, (Note: Formerly Arsbaran County) East Azerbaijan province, Iran.

== Demographics ==
=== Population ===
At the time of the 2006 National Census, the village's population was 221 in 56 households. The following census in 2011 counted 174 people in 49 households. The 2016 census measured the population of the village as 247 people in 83 households.
