= Aghbolagh-e Sofla, Varzaqan =

Village in East Azerbaijan province, Iran

Aghbolagh-e Sofla Persian: اغبلاغ سفلي
- Village
- Location within Iran
- Coordinates: 38°34′52″N 46°46′24″E
- Country: Iran
- Province: East Azerbaijan
- County: Varzaqan
- District: Central
- Rural District: Ozomdel-e Shomali

Population (2016)
  - Total: 1,418
- Time zone: UTC+3:30 (IRST)

Aghbolagh-e Sofla (Persian: اغبلاغ سفلي) (Note: Also romanized as Āghbolāgh-e Soflá; also known as Āgh Bolāgh Pā’īn, Āgh Bolāgh-e Pā’īn, Ak-Bola, Āq Bolāgh, Āqbolāgh, Āq Bolāgh-e Pā’īn, Āq Bolāgh-e Soflá, and Āq Bulāgh) is a village in Ozomdel-e Shomali Rural District of the Central District in Varzaqan County, (Note: Formerly Arsbaran County) East Azerbaijan province, Iran.

== Demographics ==
=== Population ===
At the time of the 2006 National Census, the village's population was 1,285 in 329 households. The following census in 2011 counted 1,402 people in 395 households. The 2016 census measured the population of the village as 1,418 people in 451 households. It was the most populous village in its rural district.
