= Nehriq =

Village in East Azerbaijan province, Iran

Nehriq Persian: نهريق
- Village
- Location within Iran
- Coordinates: 38°36′19″N 46°48′15″E
- Country: Iran
- Province: East Azerbaijan
- County: Varzaqan
- District: Central
- Rural District: Ozomdel-e Shomali

Population (2016)
  - Total: 518
- Time zone: UTC+3:30 (IRST)

Nehriq (Persian: نهريق) (Note: Also romanized as Nehrīq; also known as Nahrigh, Nehrlīq, Nīrīkh, and Nyrykh) is a village in Ozomdel-e Shomali Rural District of the Central District in Varzaqan County, (Note: Formerly Arsbaran County) East Azerbaijan province, Iran.

== Demographics ==
=== Population ===
At the time of the 2006 National Census, the village's population was 592 in 120 households. The following census in 2011 counted 545 people in 135 households. The 2016 census measured the population of the village as 518 people in 177 households.
