= Goshayesh, Varzaqan =

Goshayesh گشايش
- Village
- Location within Iran
- Coordinates: 38°37′30″N 46°48′49″E
- Country: Iran
- Province: East Azerbaijan
- County: Varzaqan
- Bakhsh: Central
- Rural District: Ozomdel-e Shomali

Population (2006)
  - Total: 100
- Time zone: UTC+3:30 (IRST)
  - Summer (DST): UTC+4:30 (IRDT)

Goshayesh (Persian: گشايش, also Romanized as Goshāyesh; also known as Gushegesh, Gyushegesh, Koshāyesh, and Qūshāqesh) is a village in Ozomdel-e Shomali Rural District, in the Central District of Varzaqan County, East Azerbaijan Province, Iran. At the 2006 census, its population was 100, in 20 families.
