= Kighal =

Village in East Azerbaijan province, Iran

Kighal Persian: كيغال
- Village
- Location within Iran
- Coordinates: 38°36′58″N 46°42′42″E
- Country: Iran
- Province: East Azerbaijan
- County: Varzaqan
- District: Central
- Rural District: Bakrabad

Population (2016)
  - Total: 541
- Time zone: UTC+3:30 (IRST)

Kighal (Persian: كيغال) (Note: Also romanized as Kīghāl; also known as Keqāl, Kīfāl, and Kīqāl) is a village in Bakrabad Rural District of the Central District in Varzaqan County, (Note: Formerly Arsbaran County) East Azerbaijan province, Iran.

== Demographics ==
=== Population ===
At the time of the 2006 National Census, the village's population was 537 in 125 households. The following census in 2011 counted 587 people in 149 households. The 2016 census measured the population of the village as 541 people in 168 households.
