= Masqaran =

Village in East Azerbaijan province, Iran

Masqaran Persian: مسقران
- Village
- Location within Iran
- Coordinates: 38°36′02″N 46°51′53″E
- Country: Iran
- Province: East Azerbaijan
- County: Varzaqan
- District: Central
- Rural District: Ozomdel-e Shomali

Population (2016)
  - Total: 842
- Time zone: UTC+3:30 (IRST)

Masqaran (Persian: مسقران) (Note: Also romanized as Masqarān; also known as Mackaran and Maskarān) is a village in Ozomdel-e Shomali Rural District of the Central District in Varzaqan County, (Note: Formerly Arsbaran County) East Azerbaijan province, Iran.

== Demographics ==
=== Population ===
At the time of the 2006 National Census, the village's population was 887 in 203 households. The following census in 2011 counted 879 people in 241 households. The 2016 census measured the population of the village as 842 people in 283 households.
