= Lambaran, Iran =

Lambaran لنبران
- Village
- Location within Iran
- Coordinates: 38°31′37″N 46°26′53″E
- Country: Iran
- Province: East Azerbaijan
- County: Varzaqan
- Bakhsh: Central
- Rural District: Sina

Population (2006)
  - Total: 289
- Time zone: UTC+3:30 (IRST)
  - Summer (DST): UTC+4:30 (IRDT)

Lambaran (Persian: لنبران, also Romanized as Lambarān and Lombarān; also known as Lambara, Lanbarān, Lombareh, and Lonbarān) is a village in Sina Rural District, in the Central District of Varzaqan County, East Azerbaijan Province, Iran. At the 2006 census, its population was 289, in 81 families.
