= Duriq =

Village in East Azerbaijan province, Iran

Duriq Persian: دوريق
- Village
- Location within Iran
- Coordinates: 38°33′37″N 46°39′48″E
- Country: Iran
- Province: East Azerbaijan
- County: Varzaqan
- District: Central
- Rural District: Bakrabad

Population (2016)
  - Total: 250
- Time zone: UTC+3:30 (IRST)

Duriq (Persian: دوريق) (Note: Also romanized as Dūrīq) is a village in Bakrabad Rural District of the Central District in Varzaqan County, (Note: Formerly Arsbaran County) East Azerbaijan province, Iran.

== Demographics ==
=== Population ===
At the time of the 2006 National Census, the village's population was 214 in 51 households. The following census in 2011 counted 154 people in 47 households. The 2016 census measured the population of the village as 250 people in 95 households.
