= Laleh Bejan =

Laleh Bejan لاله بجان
- Village
- Location within Iran
- Coordinates: 38°40′01″N 46°47′10″E
- Country: Iran
- Province: East Azerbaijan
- County: Varzaqan
- Bakhsh: Central
- Rural District: Ozomdel-e Shomali

Population (2006)
  - Total: 259
- Time zone: UTC+3:30 (IRST)
  - Summer (DST): UTC+4:30 (IRDT)

Laleh Bejan (Persian: لاله بجان, also Romanized as Lāleh Bejān) is a village in Ozomdel-e Shomali Rural District, in the Central District of Varzaqan County, East Azerbaijan Province, Iran. At the 2006 census, its population was 259, in 64 families.
