= Alharod, Varzaqan =

Alharod الهرد
- Village
- Location within Iran
- Coordinates: 38°28′44″N 46°28′49″E
- Country: Iran
- Province: East Azerbaijan
- County: Varzaqan
- Bakhsh: Central
- Rural District: Sina

Population (2006)
  - Total: 121
- Time zone: UTC+3:30 (IRST)
  - Summer (DST): UTC+4:30 (IRDT)

Alharod (Persian: الهرد, also Romanized as Eleherd, Alhard, and Elehred; also known as Alard, Alert, Alīrd, Alīrī, and Alirt) is a village in Sina Rural District, in the Central District of Varzaqan County, East Azerbaijan Province, Iran. At the 2006 census, its population was 121, in 24 families.
