= Bekrabad =

Bekrabad or Bakrabad (Persian: بكراباد) may refer to:

- Bakrabad, East Azerbaijan
- Bakrabad, Kerman
- Bekrabad, North Khorasan
- Bakrabad Rural District, in East Azerbaijan Province
- Bekrabad, a Shi'ite neighborhood in Herat, Afghanistan
