= Abkhareh =

Village in East Azerbaijan province, Iran

Abkhareh Persian: ابخواره
- Village
- Location within Iran
- Coordinates: 38°30′57″N 46°31′49″E
- Country: Iran
- Province: East Azerbaijan
- County: Varzaqan
- District: Central
- Rural District: Sina

Population (2016)
  - Total: 305
- Time zone: UTC+3:30 (IRST)

Abkhareh (Persian: ابخواره) (Note: Also romanized as Āb Khvāreh, Ābkhāreh, Abkhvareh, and Ābkhvāreh; also known as Abkhāra, Avkhara, and Avkhāreh) is a village in Sina Rural District of the Central District in Varzaqan County, (Note: Formerly Arsbaran County) East Azerbaijan province, Iran.

== Demographics ==
=== Population ===
At the time of the 2006 National Census, the village's population was 207 in 50 households. The following census in 2011 counted 186 people in 56 households. The 2016 census measured the population of the village as 305 in 100 households.
