= Qareh Bolagh, Varzaqan =

Qareh Bolagh قره‌بلاغ
- Village
- Location within Iran
- Coordinates: 38°29′05″N 46°34′24″E
- Country: Iran
- Province: East Azerbaijan
- County: Varzaqan
- Bakhsh: Central
- Rural District: Ozomdel-e Jonubi

Population (2006)
  - Total: 237
- Time zone: UTC+3:30 (IRST)
  - Summer (DST): UTC+4:30 (IRDT)

Qareh Bolagh (Persian: قره‌بلاغ, also Romanized as Qareh Bolāgh; also known as Karabulag, Qara Bulāgh, Qarah Bowlāgh, Qara Tepe, and Qareh Tappeh) is a village in Ozomdel-e Jonubi Rural District, in the Central District of Varzaqan County, East Azerbaijan Province, Iran. At the 2006 census, its population was 237, in 53 families.
