= Barazin, Varzaqan =

Barazin برازين
- Village
- Location within Iran
- Coordinates: 38°43′02″N 46°47′42″E
- Country: Iran
- Province: East Azerbaijan
- County: Varzaqan
- Bakhsh: Central
- Rural District: Ozomdel-e Shomali

Population (2006)
  - Total: 269
- Time zone: UTC+3:30 (IRST)
  - Summer (DST): UTC+4:30 (IRDT)

Barazin (Persian: برازين, also Romanized as Barāzīn) is a village in Ozomdel-e Shomali Rural District, in the Central District of Varzaqan County, East Azerbaijan Province, Iran. At the 2006 census, its population was 269, in 51 families.
