= Avilaq =

Village in East Azerbaijan province, Iran

Avilaq Persian: اويلق
- Village
- Location within Iran
- Coordinates: 38°33′45″N 46°29′01″E
- Country: Iran
- Province: East Azerbaijan
- County: Varzaqan
- District: Central
- Rural District: Sina

Population (2016)
  - Total: 495
- Time zone: UTC+3:30 (IRST)

Avilaq (Persian: اويلق) (Note: Also romanized as Āvīlaq and Avīlaq; also known as Āblī, Ālbī, and Avli) is a village in Sina Rural District of the Central District in Varzaqan County, (Note: Formerly Arsbaran County) East Azerbaijan province, Iran.

== Demographics ==
=== Population ===
At the time of the 2006 National Census, the village's population was 528 in 108 households. The following census in 2011 counted 475 people in 127 households. The 2016 census measured the population of the village as 495 in 163 households. It was the most populous village in its rural district.
