= Alavi, Iran =

Alavi (Persian: علوي) in Iran may refer to:

- Allahlu, Varzaqan, a village in East Azerbaijan Province, Iran
- Alaviq, Varzaqan, a village in East Azerbaijan Province, Iran
- Alavi, Hamadan, a village in Hamadan Province, Iran
- Alavi, Isfahan, a village in Isfahan Province, Iran
- Alavi, Khuzestan, a village in Khuzestan Province, Iran
- Alavi, an alternate name of Alavicheh, a city in Isfahan Province, Iran
