= Mehtarlu =

Village in East Azerbaijan province, Iran

Mehtarlu Persian: مهترلو
- Village
- Location within Iran
- Coordinates: 38°28′16″N 46°42′40″E
- Country: Iran
- Province: East Azerbaijan
- County: Varzaqan
- District: Central
- Rural District: Ozomdel-e Jonubi

Population (2016)
  - Total: 923
- Time zone: UTC+3:30 (IRST)

Mehtarlu (Persian: مهترلو) (Note: Also romanized as Mehtarlū; also known as Mehdī Yārī, Mekhtiāri, and Mekhtyari) is a village in Ozomdel-e Jonubi Rural District of the Central District in Varzaqan County, (Note: Formerly Arsbaran County) East Azerbaijan province, Iran.

== Demographics ==
=== Population ===
At the time of the 2006 National Census, the village's population was 881 in 186 households. The following census in 2011 counted 890 people in 210 households. The 2016 census measured the population of the village as 923 people in 281 households.
