= Siah Kalan, East Azerbaijan =

Village in East Azerbaijan province, Iran

Siah Kalan Persian: سيه كلان
- Village
- Location within Iran
- Coordinates: 38°36′46″N 46°44′26″E
- Country: Iran
- Province: East Azerbaijan
- County: Varzaqan
- District: Central
- Rural District: Ozomdel-e Shomali

Population (2016)
  - Total: 374
- Time zone: UTC+3:30 (IRST)

Siah Kalan (Persian: سيه كلان) (Note: Also romanized as Sīāh Kalān, Sīah Kalān, and Siyah Kalan; also known as Sīāh Kūlyān, Siahkuliān, and Siakh-Kulan) is a village in Ozomdel-e Shomali Rural District of the Central District in Varzaqan County, (Note: Formerly Arsbaran County) East Azerbaijan province, Iran.

== Demographics ==
=== Population ===
At the time of the 2006 National Census, the village's population was 374 in 114 households. The following census in 2011 counted 374 people in 90 households. The 2016 census measured the population of the village as 374 people in 114 households.
