= Yashil =

Village in East Azerbaijan province, Iran

Yashil Persian: ياشيل
- Village
- Location within Iran
- Coordinates: 38°34′54″N 46°39′14″E
- Country: Iran
- Province: East Azerbaijan
- County: Varzaqan
- District: Central
- Rural District: Bakrabad

Population (2016)
  - Total: 231
- Time zone: UTC+3:30 (IRST)

Yashil (Persian: ياشيل) (Note: Also romanized as Yāshīl; also known as Bāshīl and Yāshel) is a village in Bakrabad Rural District of the Central District in Varzaqan County, (Note: Formerly Arsbaran County) East Azerbaijan province, Iran.

== Demographics ==
=== Population ===
At the time of the 2006 National Census, the village's population was 218 in 53 households. The following census in 2011 counted 197 people in 58 households. The 2016 census measured the population of the village as 231 people in 74 households.
