= Ali Beyg Kandi, Varzaqan =

Ali Beyg Kandi علي بيگ كندي
- Village
- Location within Iran
- Coordinates: 38°25′22″N 46°41′33″E
- Country: Iran
- Province: East Azerbaijan
- County: Varzaqan
- Bakhsh: Central
- Rural District: Ozomdel-e Jonubi

Population (2006)
  - Total: 130
- Time zone: UTC+3:30 (IRST)
  - Summer (DST): UTC+4:30 (IRDT)

Ali Beyg Kandi (Persian: علي بيگ كندي, also Romanized as ‘Alī Beyg Kandī; also known as Alba Kand, Alba Kandi, Al’ ba-Kendy, ‘Alī Bekandī, and ‘Alī Beyk Kandī) is a village in Ozomdel-e Jonubi Rural District, in the Central District of Varzaqan County, East Azerbaijan Province, Iran. At the 2006 census, its population was 130, in 27 families.
