= Qareh Qayeh, Varzaqan =

Qareh Qayeh قره‌قیه
- Village
- Location within Iran
- Coordinates: 38°26′56″N 46°27′53″E
- Country: Iran
- Province: East Azerbaijan
- County: Varzaqan
- Bakhsh: Central
- Rural District: Sina

Population (2006)
  - Total: 54
- Time zone: UTC+3:30 (IRST)
  - Summer (DST): UTC+4:30 (IRDT)

Qareh Qayeh (Persian: قره‌قيه, also Romanized as Qarah Qīyah; also known as Garkīyeh, Qareh Qīyah-e Moshk-e ‘Anbar, and Qareh Tappeh) is a village in Sina Rural District, in the Central District of Varzaqan County, East Azerbaijan Province, Iran. At the 2006 census, its population was 54, in 8 families.
