= Malek Talesh =

Malek Talesh ملك طالش
- Village
- Location within Iran
- Coordinates: 38°42′37″N 46°32′42″E
- Country: Iran
- Province: East Azerbaijan
- County: Varzaqan
- Bakhsh: Central
- Rural District: Sina

Population (2015)
  - Total: 167
- Time zone: UTC+3:30 (IRST)
  - Summer (DST): UTC+4:30 (IRDT)

Malek Talesh (Persian: ملك طالش, also Romanized as Malek Ţālesh; also known as Malek, Molk, and Mulk) is a village in Sina Rural District, in the Central District of Varzaqan County, East Azerbaijan Province, Iran. At the 2015 census, its population was 167, in 53 families.
