= Guyjeh-ye Soltan =

Village in East Azerbaijan province, Iran

Guyjeh-ye Soltan Persian: گويجه سلطان
- Village
- Location within Iran
- Coordinates: 38°31′51″N 46°38′33″E
- Country: Iran
- Province: East Azerbaijan
- County: Varzaqan
- District: Central
- Rural District: Ozomdel-e Jonubi

Population (2016)
  - Total: 806
- Time zone: UTC+3:30 (IRST)

Guyjeh-ye Soltan (Persian: گويجه سلطان) (Note: Also romanized as Gowyjeh Solţān, Gowyjeh-ye Solţān, and Gūyjeh-ye Solţān; also known as Deija Sultān, Deydzha-Sul’tan, Deyjeh Solţān, and Goyjeh Soltān) is a village in Ozomdel-e Jonubi Rural District of the Central District in Varzaqan County, (Note: Formerly Arsbaran County) East Azerbaijan province, Iran.

== Demographics ==
=== Population ===
At the time of the 2006 National Census, the village's population was 803 in 183 households. The following census in 2011 counted 822 people in 226 households. The 2016 census measured the population of the village as 806 people in 243 households.
