= Ozomdel =

Ozomdel (Persian: ازومدل) may refer to:

- Ozomdel-e Jonubi Rural District
- Ozomdel-e Shomali Rural District
