= Sharafabad, East Azerbaijan =

Village in East Azerbaijan province, Iran

Sharafabad Persian: شرف اباد
- Village
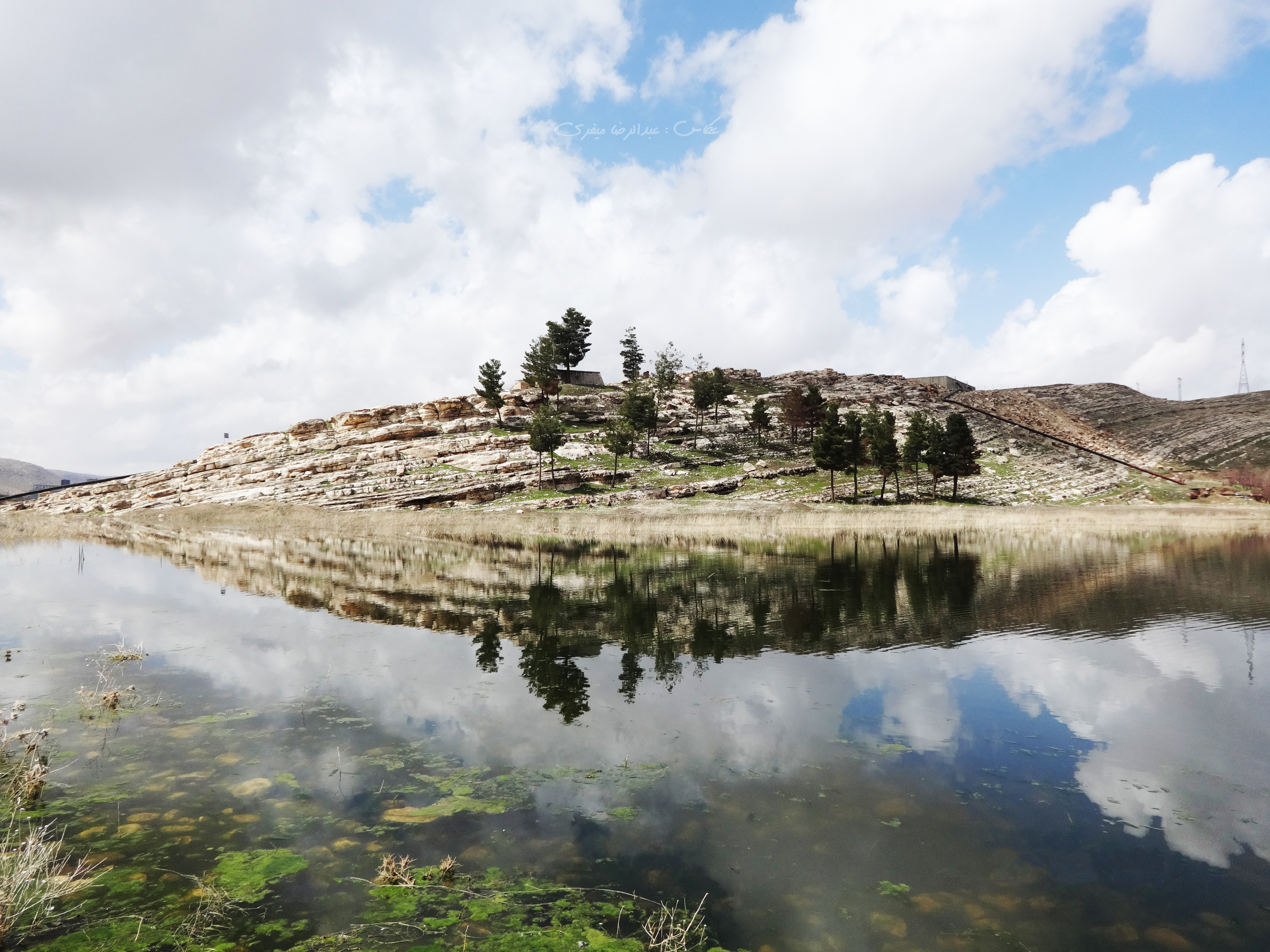
- Sarāb-e Sharafābād

- Location within Iran
- Coordinates: 38°36′42″N 46°31′04″E
- Country: Iran
- Province: East Azerbaijan
- County: Varzaqan
- District: Central
- Rural District: Sina

Population (2016)
  - Total: 453
- Time zone: UTC+3:30 (IRST)

Sharafabad (Persian: شرف اباد) (Note: Also romanized as Sharafābād; also known as Sharafa, Sharafeh, and Sharehfeh) is a village in Sina Rural District of the Central District in Varzaqan County, (Note: Formerly Arsbaran County) East Azerbaijan province, Iran.

== Demographics ==
=== Population ===
At the time of the 2006 National Census, the village's population was 694 in 140 households. The following census in 2011 counted 550 people in 149 households. The 2016 census measured the population of the village as 453 in 128 households.
