= Sifar, Iran =

Village in East Azerbaijan province, Iran

Sifar Persian: صيفار
- Village
- Location within Iran
- Coordinates: 38°30′55″N 46°27′40″E
- Country: Iran
- Province: East Azerbaijan
- County: Varzaqan
- District: Central
- Rural District: Sina

Population (2016)
  - Total: 323
- Time zone: UTC+3:30 (IRST)

Sifar (Persian: صيفار) (Note: Also romanized as Seifar, Seyfar, and Şīfār; also known as Şeyghār and Şīghār) is a village in Sina Rural District of the Central District in Varzaqan County, (Note: Formerly Arsbaran County) East Azerbaijan province, Iran.

== Demographics ==
=== Population ===
At the time of the 2006 National Census, the village's population was 321 in 61 households. The following census in 2011 counted 297 people in 86 households. The 2016 census measured the population of the village as 323 in 96 households.
