= Kohneh Lu =

Village in East Azerbaijan province, Iran

Kohneh Lu Persian: كهنه لو
- Village
- Location within Iran
- Coordinates: 38°32′47″N 46°32′19″E
- Country: Iran
- Province: East Azerbaijan
- County: Varzaqan
- District: Central
- Rural District: Sina

Population (2016)
  - Total: 471
- Time zone: UTC+3:30 (IRST)

Kohneh Lu (Persian: كهنه لو) (Note: Also romanized as Kohneh Lū and Kohnehlū; also known as Chakhnali) is a village in Sina Rural District of the Central District in Varzaqan County, (Note: Formerly Arsbaran County) East Azerbaijan province, Iran.

== Demographics ==
=== Population ===
At the time of the 2006 National Census, the village's population was 521 in 104 households. The following census in 2011 counted 417 people in 96 households. The 2016 census measured the population of the village as 471 in 127 households.
