= Sowmaeh Del =

Village in East Azerbaijan province, Iran

Sowmaeh Del Persian: صومعه دل
- Village
- Location within Iran
- Coordinates: 38°31′10″N 46°43′15″E
- Country: Iran
- Province: East Azerbaijan
- County: Varzaqan
- District: Central
- Rural District: Ozomdel-e Jonubi

Population (2016)
  - Total: 1,772
- Time zone: UTC+3:30 (IRST)

Sowmaeh Del (Persian: صومعه دل) (Note: Also romanized as Şowma‘eh Del, Şowme‘eh Del, and Şowmeh Del; also known as Sumadi, Sumadil, and Suma-Dyl’) is a village in Ozomdel-e Jonubi Rural District of the Central District in Varzaqan County, (Note: Formerly Arsbaran County) East Azerbaijan province, Iran.

== Demographics ==
=== Population ===
At the time of the 2006 National Census, the village's population was 1,369 in 321 households. The following census in 2011 counted 1,675 people in 448 households. The 2016 census measured the population of the village as 1,772 people in 557 households.
