= Alucheh Qeshlaq =

Village in East Azerbaijan province, Iran

Alucheh Qeshlaq Persian: الوچه قشلاق
- Village
- Location within Iran
- Coordinates: 38°36′29″N 46°38′25″E
- Country: Iran
- Province: East Azerbaijan
- County: Varzaqan
- District: Central
- Rural District: Bakrabad

Population (2016)
  - Total: 257
- Time zone: UTC+3:30 (IRST)

Alucheh Qeshlaq (Persian: الوچه قشلاق) (Note: Also romanized as Ālūcheh Qeshlāq; also known as Alcheh Gheshlagh, Ālcheh Qeshlāq, Kyshlag, Qeshlāq, Qeshlāq Ālūcheh, and Qishlāq) is a village in Bakrabad Rural District of the Central District in Varzaqan County, (Note: Formerly Arsbaran County) East Azerbaijan province, Iran.

== Demographics ==
=== Population ===
At the time of the 2006 National Census, the village's population was 310 in 67 households. The following census in 2011 counted 269 people in 76 households. The 2016 census measured the population of the village as 257 people in 79 households.
