= Ruzi =

Village in East Azerbaijan province, Iran

Ruzi Persian: روزي
- Village
- Location within Iran
- Coordinates: 38°33′42″N 46°33′58″E
- Country: Iran
- Province: East Azerbaijan
- County: Varzaqan
- District: Central
- Rural District: Ozomdel-e Jonubi

Population (2016)
  - Total: 796
- Time zone: UTC+3:30 (IRST)

Ruzi (Persian: روزي) (Note: Also romanized as Rūzī) is a village in Ozomdel-e Jonubi Rural District of the Central District in Varzaqan County, (Note: Formerly Arsbaran County) East Azerbaijan province, Iran.

== Demographics ==
=== Population ===
At the time of the 2006 National Census, the village's population was 733 in 162 households. The following census in 2011 counted 768 people in 213 households. The 2016 census measured the population of the village as 796 people in 233 households.
