= Ali Beyg Kandi =

Ali Beyg Kandi (Persian: علي بيگ كندي) may refer to:

- Ali Beyg Kandi, Charuymaq
- Ali Beyg Kandi, Varzaqan
