= Tokhom Del =

Village in East Azerbaijan province, Iran

Tokhom Del Persian: تخمدل
- Village
- Location within Iran
- Coordinates: 38°33′55″N 46°44′30″E
- Country: Iran
- Province: East Azerbaijan
- County: Varzaqan
- District: Central
- Rural District: Ozomdel-e Shomali

Population (2016)
  - Total: 698
- Time zone: UTC+3:30 (IRST)

Tokhom Del (Persian: تخمدل) (Note: Also romanized as Tokhomdel; also known as Tokhumdil and Tokhundil’) is a village in, and the capital of, Ozomdel-e Shomali Rural District in the Central District of Varzaqan County, (Note: Formerly Arsbaran County) East Azerbaijan province, Iran.

== Demographics ==
=== Population ===
At the time of the 2006 National Census, the village's population was 660 in 169 households. The following census in 2011 counted 738 people in 198 households. The 2016 census measured the population of the village as 698 people in 237 households.
