= Dizaj-e Malek =

Village in East Azerbaijan province, Iran

Dizaj-e Malek Persian: ديزج ملك
- Village
- Location within Iran
- Coordinates: 38°30′56″N 46°35′39″E
- Country: Iran
- Province: East Azerbaijan
- County: Varzaqan
- District: Central
- Rural District: Ozomdel-e Jonubi

Population (2016)
  - Total: 1,235
- Time zone: UTC+3:30 (IRST)

Dizaj-e Malek (Persian: ديزج ملك) (Note: Also romanized as Dīzaj Malek and Dīzaj-e Malek; also known as Diza, Dīzaj, and Dīzeh) is a village in Ozomdel-e Jonubi Rural District of the Central District in Varzaqan County, (Note: Formerly Arsbaran County) East Azerbaijan province, Iran.

== Demographics ==
=== Population ===
At the time of the 2006 National Census, the village's population was 1,123 in 238 households. The following census in 2011 counted 1,183 people in 291 households. The 2016 census measured the population of the village as 1,235 people in 372 households.
