= Jajan =

Jajan (Persian: جاجن or جاجان) may refer to:

- Jajan, East Azerbaijan (جاجان - Jājān)
- Jajan, Mazandaran (جاجن - Jājan)
