= Kyaraly =

Kyaraly may refer to:

- Bakrabad, East Azerbaijan
- Karaviq
