= Kasin =

Village in East Azerbaijan province, Iran

Kasin Persian: كاسين
- Village
- Location within Iran
- Coordinates: 38°32′03″N 46°35′51″E
- Country: Iran
- Province: East Azerbaijan
- County: Varzaqan
- District: Central
- Rural District: Ozomdel-e Jonubi

Population (2016)
  - Total: 2,780
- Time zone: UTC+3:30 (IRST)

Kasin (Persian: كاسين) (Note: Also romanized as Kāsīn; also known as Chasin) is a village in Ozomdel-e Jonubi Rural District of the Central District in Varzaqan County, (Note: Formerly Arsbaran County) East Azerbaijan province, Iran.

== Demographics ==
=== Population ===
At the time of the 2006 National Census, the village's population was 1,917 in 430 households. The following census in 2011 counted 2,178 people in 552 households. The 2016 census measured the population of the village as 2,780 people in 840 households. It was the most populous village in its rural district.
