= Samsam Kandi =

Samsam Kandi صمصام كندي
- Village
- Location within Iran
- Coordinates: 38°25′20″N 46°30′12″E
- Country: Iran
- Province: East Azerbaijan
- County: Varzaqan
- Bakhsh: Central
- Rural District: Sina

Population (2006)
  - Total: 41
- Time zone: UTC+3:30 (IRST)
  - Summer (DST): UTC+4:30 (IRDT)

Samsam Kandi (Persian: صمصام كندي, also Romanized as Şamşām Kandī; also known as Şamşām) is a village in Sina Rural District, in the Central District of Varzaqan County, East Azerbaijan Province, Iran. At the 2006 census, its population was 41, in 10 families.
