= Allahlu, Varzaqan =

Village in East Azerbaijan province, Iran

Allahlu Persian: لله لو
- Village
- Location within Iran
- Coordinates: 38°29′43″N 46°41′07″E
- Country: Iran
- Province: East Azerbaijan
- County: Varzaqan
- District: Central
- Rural District: Ozomdel-e Jonubi

Population (2016)
  - Total: 822
- Time zone: UTC+3:30 (IRST)

Allahlu (Persian: لله لو) (Note: Also romanized as Allahlū; also known as ‘Alavī, Alyali, Lalahlū, Lalallū, Laleh Loo, and Lalehlū) is a village in Ozomdel-e Jonubi Rural District of the Central District in Varzaqan County, (Note: Formerly Arsbaran County) East Azerbaijan province, Iran.

== Demographics ==
=== Population ===
At the time of the 2006 National Census, the village's population was 820 in 190 households. The following census in 2011 counted 827 people in 223 households. The 2016 census measured the population of the village as 822 people in 268 households.
