= Barazin, Iran =

Barazin (Persian: برازين) in Iran may refer to:

- Barazin, Heris
- Barazin, Khoda Afarin
- Barazin, Varzaqan
