= Lemberan =

Lemberan or Lambaran or Lanbaran may refer to:

- Ləmbəran, Azerbaijan
- Lənbəran, Azerbaijan
- Lambaran, Iran
