= Alherd, Iran =

Alherd or Alhard or Elehred or Alharod (Persian: الهرد), in Iran, may refer to:

- Alherd, Khoda Afarin
- Alharod, Varzaqan
