= Karaviq =

Village in East Azerbaijan province, Iran

Karaviq Persian: كرويق
- Village
- Location within Iran
- Coordinates: 38°32′54″N 46°41′38″E
- Country: Iran
- Province: East Azerbaijan
- County: Varzaqan
- District: Central
- Rural District: Bakrabad

Population (2016)
  - Total: 231
- Time zone: UTC+3:30 (IRST)

Karaviq (Persian: كرويق) (Note: Also romanized as Karavīq; also known as Karavī, Karvigh, Keyāralī, Kiarali, and Kyaraly) is a village in Bakrabad Rural District of the Central District in Varzaqan County, (Note: Formerly Arsbaran County) East Azerbaijan province, Iran.

== Demographics ==
=== Population ===
At the time of the 2006 National Census, the village's population was 257 in 67 households. The following census in 2011 counted 229 people in 65 households. The 2016 census measured the population of the village as 231 people in 71 households.
