= Moln =

Moln may refer to:

- Mölln, Schleswig-Holstein, Germany
- Moln, Iran
