= Guzan =

Guzan may refer to:

- Guzan, Iran
- Brad Guzan, footballer
