= Alaviq, Varzaqan =

Village in East Azerbaijan province, Iran

Alaviq Persian: علويق
- Village
- Location within Iran
- Coordinates: 38°33′52″N 46°36′41″E
- Country: Iran
- Province: East Azerbaijan
- County: Varzaqan
- District: Central
- Rural District: Ozomdel-e Jonubi

Population (2016)
  - Total: 1,034
- Time zone: UTC+3:30 (IRST)

Alaviq (Persian: علويق) (Note: Also romanized as ‘Alavīq; also known as ‘Alavī, Alevi, and Alivi) is a village in Ozomdel-e Jonubi Rural District of the Central District in Varzaqan County, (Note: Formerly Arsbaran County) East Azerbaijan province, Iran.

== Demographics ==
=== Population ===
At the time of the 2006 National Census, the village's population was 1,125 in 247 households. The following census in 2011 counted 1,126 people in 317 households. The 2016 census measured the population of the village as 1,034 people in 306 households.
