= Karatepe (disambiguation) =

Karatepe (Turkish, 'Black Hill') is a Hittite fortress in Osmaniye Province in Turkey.

Karatepe may also refer to:

== Places in Turkey ==
- Karatepe, Alaca
- Karatepe, Antalya
- Karatepe, Bismil
- Karatepe, Gazipaşa
- Karatepe, Kalecik
- Karatepe, Köşk
- Karatepe, Merzifon

== Other uses ==
- Kara Tepe refugee camp, in Lesbos, Greece
- Kara Tepe, a Buddhist archaeological site in Termez, Uzbekistan

== See also ==
- Qarah Tappeh (disambiguation), often rendered as Kara Tepe
- Karatepe bilingual, an 8th-century BC inscription on stone slabs
