= Jajan, East Azerbaijan =

Village in East Azerbaijan province, Iran

Jajan Persian: جاجان
- Village
- Location within Iran
- Coordinates: 38°38′13″N 46°51′18″E
- Country: Iran
- Province: East Azerbaijan
- County: Varzaqan
- District: Central
- Rural District: Ozomdel-e Shomali

Population (2016)
  - Total: 652
- Time zone: UTC+3:30 (IRST)

Jajan (Persian: جاجان) (Note: Also romanized as Jājān; also known as Dzhodzhan and Gūzan) is a village in Ozomdel-e Shomali Rural District of the Central District in Varzaqan County, (Note: Formerly Arsbaran County) East Azerbaijan province, Iran.

== Demographics ==
=== Population ===
At the time of the 2006 National Census, the village's population was 772 in 188 households. The following census in 2011 counted 695 people in 193 households. The 2016 census measured the population of the village as 652 people in 201 households.
