= Bakrabad, East Azerbaijan =

Village in East Azerbaijan province, Iran

Bakrabad Persian: بكراباد
- Village
- Location within Iran
- Coordinates: 38°34′36″N 46°41′38″E
- Country: Iran
- Province: East Azerbaijan
- County: Varzaqan
- District: Central
- Rural District: Bakrabad

Population (2016)
  - Total: 717
- Time zone: UTC+3:30 (IRST)

Bakrabad (Persian: بكراباد) (Note: Also romanized as Bakrābād and Bekrābād; also known as Bākyāb, Bekiab, and Kyaraly) is a village in, and the capital of, Bakrabad Rural District in the Central District of Varzaqan County, (Note: Formerly Arsbaran County) East Azerbaijan province, Iran.

== Demographics ==
=== Population ===
At the time of the 2006 National Census, the village's population was 605 in 135 households. The following census in 2011 counted 668 people in 192 households. The 2016 census measured the population of the village as 717 people in 230 households. It was the most populous village in its rural district.
