= Bijan =

- Gender: Male

Origin
- Origin: Persian

Bijan (also Bizhan, Bijhan or Bejan; Persian: بیژن) is a Persian given name meaning "Hero". People named Bijan include:

- Bijan (designer) (1940-2011), surname Pakzad, a fashion and perfume designer
- Bijan Abdolkarimi (born 1963), Iranian philosopher
- Bijan Allipour (1949–2023), Iranian businessman
- Bijan Beg Saakadze, Safavid noble and officeholder
- Bijan Beg (son of Rostam Khan), Safavid official
- Bijan Daneshmand (born 1958), Iranian actor
- Bijan Djir-Sarai (born 1976), Iranian-born German politician
- Bijan Emkanian (born 1953), Iranian actor
- Bijan Jalali (1927-2000), Iranian poet
- Bijan Jazani (1938-1975), Iranian intellectual
- Bijan Kamkar, Iranian musician
- Bijan Kian (born 1952), Iranian-American businessman involved in American politics, notably associated with the administration of Donald Trump
- Bijan Mortazavi (born 1957), violinist and singer
- Bijan Namdar Zangeneh (born 1952), Iranian politician
- Bijan Robinson (born 2002), American football player
- Bijan Sabet, American venture capitalist and diplomat
- Bijan Nobaveh-Vatan (born 1959), Iranian politician

== In literature ==
- Bijan, a character in Bijan and Manijeh, a love story in the Persian epic poem Shahnameh

== See also ==
- Bejan (disambiguation)
- Beejan
