= Beejan =

Beejan is a given name and surname. Notable people with the name include:

- Beejan Land (born 1985), Australian actor
- Beejan Kangarloo (born 1985), Canadian skier
- Nitish Beejan (fl. from 2024), Mauritian politician

== See also ==
- Bejan
- Bijan
