= Samsam-ud-Daula =

Samsam-ud-Daula ("Sword of the State") was a medieval titular name of Persian and Arabic origin.

== People ==
- Samsam al-Dawla (10th century) Amir of Iraq
- Samsam ud Daula Shah Nawaz Khan, (18th century) historian of Imperial Hyderabad
- Ghulam Shah Kalhoro, (18th century) also known by the title Samsam-ud-Daulah by Ahmad Shah Durrani
- Khan Dowran VII, (18th century) also known as Samsam ud-Daula Khan Dowran was a Mughal administrator and commander

== See also ==
- Al-Dawla
