= SamSam (film) =

2019 animated feature film

- French theatrical release poster
- Directed by: Tanguy de Kermel
- Screenplay by: Valérie Magis; Jean Regnaud
- Based on: SamSam by Serge Bloch
- Cinematography: Tanguy de Kermel
- Music by: Éric Neveux
- Production company: Folivari
- Distributed by: StudioCanal
- Release dates: 7 December 2019 (Annecy Festival); 5 February 2020 (France)
- Running time: 80 minutes
- Countries: France; Belgium
- Languages: French; English
- Box office: $3.2 million

SamSam is a 2019 French animated superhero science fantasy comedy film directed by Tanguy de Kermel and based on the children's television series of the same name created by Serge Bloch. Produced by Folivari, the film premiered at the Annecy International Animation Film Festival on 7 December 2019, and was released theatrically in France on 5 February 2020 by StudioCanal. It generally received mixed reviews from critics.

== Plot ==
SamSam lives a rich life with an array of friends, but the one thing he has yet to attain are actual superpowers. While he tries to figure it out, he must prepare to fight monsters and learn what it means to be a hero.

== Voice cast ==
- Isaac Lobé-Lebel/Tucker Chandler as SamSam
- Lior Chabbat/Lily Sanfelippo as Mega
- Jérémy Prévost/Dino Andrade as King Marthial the 1st
- Sébastien Desjours/Michael Yurchak as SamTeddy
- Léopold vom Dorp/Connor Elias Andrade as SweetPea
- Victoire Pauwels/Faith Graham as SuperJulie
- Léovanie Raud/Michelle Deco as Lady Fathola
- Laurent Maurel/Cam Clarke as Marthientist
- Damien Boisseau/Evan Smith as SamDaddy
- Marie-Eugénie Maréchal/Karen Strassman as SamMummy
- Philippe Spiteri/Kellen Goff as MuckyYuck
- Simon Brunner/Addie Chandler as Sumojo
- Françoise Pavy/Karen Strassman as GrannyPea
- Magali Rozensweig/Caitlin Prennace as Miss Bridget
- Julien Crampon/Micheal Yurchak as Tuffy
- Emmylou Homs/Caitlin Prennace as Catty
- Martin Spinhayer/Kellen Goff as GloomyGlob Monster/The Wettabeds
- Philippe Roullier as the television presenter

== Release ==
SamSam premiered at the Annecy International Animation Film Festival on 7 December 2019, and was released theatrically in France on 5 February 2020. It was distributed by StudioCanal. The film opened with $532,953 in France for a total gross of $2,315,818, and a worldwide total of $3,197,240. Outside of France, Poland had the largest number of admissions for SamSam with over 35,500, amounting to $171,672 at the Polish box office.

=== Reception ===
The film received generally negative reviews from critics. On review aggregator Rotten Tomatoes, the film holds an approval rating of 20% based on 5 critical reviews. The film was a critical failure, but a commercial success.
