= Qareh Tappeh, Ardabil =

Qareh Tappeh قره‌تپه
- Location in Iran
- Coordinates: 38°28′29″N 47°39′08″E
- Country: Iran
- Province: Ardabil Province
- Time zone: UTC+3:30 (IRST)
  - Summer (DST): UTC+4:30 (IRDT)

Qareh Tappeh (Persian: قره‌تپه) is a village in the Ardabil Province of Iran.

It is located 20 km north-east of Qom and is the site of the archeological excavation of Qamroud village.
