= Alaviq, Kaleybar =

Alaviq علويق
- Village
- Location within Iran
- Coordinates: 38°43′17″N 46°59′05″E
- Country: Iran
- Province: East Azerbaijan
- County: Kaleybar
- Bakhsh: Central
- Rural District: Peyghan Chayi

Population (2006)
  - Total: 23
- Time zone: UTC+3:30 (IRST)
  - Summer (DST): UTC+4:30 (IRDT)

Alaviq (Persian: علويق, also Romanized as ‘Alavīq; also known as Alyavi) is a village in Peyghan Chayi Rural District, in the Central District of Kaleybar County, East Azerbaijan Province, Iran. At the 2006 census, its population was 23, in 7 families.
