= Qareh Tappeh, Marand =

Qareh Tappeh قره‌تپه
- Village
- Location within Iran
- Coordinates: 38°35′59″N 45°44′28″E
- Country: Iran
- Province: East Azerbaijan
- County: Marand
- Bakhsh: Central
- Rural District: Harzandat-e Sharqi

Population (2006)
  - Total: 121
- Time zone: UTC+3:30 (IRST)
  - Summer (DST): UTC+4:30 (IRDT)

Qareh Tappeh (Persian: قره‌تپه; also known as Karatapa, Qara Tepe, and Rah Tappeh) is a village in Harzandat-e Sharqi Rural District, in the Central District of Marand County, East Azerbaijan Province, Iran. At the 2006 census, its population was 121, in 42 families.
