= Qarah Tappeh, Sonqor =

Qarah Tappeh قره‌تپه
- Village
- Location within Iran
- Coordinates: 34°45′33″N 47°45′23″E
- Country: Iran
- Province: Kermanshah
- County: Sonqor
- Bakhsh: Central
- Rural District: Ab Barik

Population (2006)
  - Total: 420
- Time zone: UTC+3:30 (IRST)
  - Summer (DST): UTC+4:30 (IRDT)

Qarah Tappeh (Persian: قره‌تپه, also Romanized as Qareh Tappeh) is a village in Ab Barik Rural District, in the Central District of Sonqor County, Kermanshah Province, Iran. At the 2006 census, its population was 420, in 128 families.
