= Goshayesh, Maragheh =

Goshayesh گشایش
- Village
- Location within Iran
- Coordinates: 37°19′40″N 46°20′44″E
- Country: Iran
- Province: East Azerbaijan
- County: Maragheh
- Bakhsh: Central
- Rural District: Sarajuy-ye Shomali

Population (2006)
  - Total: 194
- Time zone: UTC+3:30 (IRST)
  - Summer (DST): UTC+4:30 (IRDT)

Goshayesh (Persian: گشایش, also Romanized as Goshāyesh) is a village in Sarajuy-ye Shomali Rural District, in the Central District of Maragheh County, East Azerbaijan Province, Iran. At the 2006 census, its population was 194, in 52 families.
