= Bejan Matur =

Turkish writer (born 1968)

Bejan Matur (born 14 September 1968, Kahramanmaraş) is a Kurdish poet and writer from Turkey.

== Background ==
Matur was born to an Alevi Kurdish family on 14 September 1968 in the city of Kahramanmaraş in Turkey's Mediterranean Region. Her first school education was in her village; later she attended the long-established Lycée in the region's most important cultural center Gaziantep. These years were spent living with her sisters far from their parents. She studied Law at Ankara University, but has never practiced. In her university years, she was published in several literary periodicals. Reviewers found her poetry "dark and mystic". The shamanist poetry with its pagan perceptions, belonging to the past rather than the present, of her birthplace and the nature and life of her village, attracted much attention.

== Works ==
Bejan Matur's debut collection, Rüzgar Dolu Konaklar (Winds Howl Through the Mansions), was published in 1996. The work departed from the contemporary mainstream of Turkish poetry and received several literary awards. Her second book, Tanrı Görmesin Harflerimi (God Must Not See the Letters of My Script), followed in 1999. In 2002, she published two concurrent volumes, Ayın Büyüttüğü Oğullar (The Sons Reared by the Moon) and Onun Çölünde (In His Desert), which continued her established linguistic style and use of imagery.

Matur's poetry has been translated into 17 languages. A collection titled In the Temple of a Patient God was published in England by ARC, while PHİ Publishing House released German and French translations of her work in Luxembourg. Her 2008 book, İbrahim’in Beni Terketmesi (How Abraham Abandoned Me), was highly regarded by critics for its mystical imagery and its development of a personal ontology and mythology inspired by Sufi tradition.

In May 2009, Matur released Doğunun Kapısı: Diyarbakır (The Gate of the East: Diyarbakır), an "album-book" examining the 3,000-year history of the Diyarbakır. Combining poetic text with photography, the book explores the city as the ancestral home of Kurdish and Armenian peoples and received critical praise for its portrayal of the Anatolian urban landscape.

Her subsequent projects include:

2010: Kader Denizi (Sea of Fate), a collaboration with photographer Mehmet Günyeli following exhibitions in Istanbul and Ankara.

2010: A monologue for the play Son Defa (The Last Time) performed by Tiyatro Oyunevi.

2010: The poem "Dağ" (Mountain), published in the collection Özgürlük (Freedom) in cooperation with Amnesty International.

In February 2011, Matur published Dağın Ardına Bakmak (Looking Behind the Mountain), her first prose work. The book focuses on the personal stories and traumas of both former and active guerrillas. To conduct research for the interviews, she traveled to the Kandil Mountains to document the experiences of those involved in the conflict with the Turkish Army. The work is noted as an early attempt to portray the personal narratives and psychological impacts on those behind the front lines.

== Journalism and other contributions ==
Between 2003 and 2013, she wrote regular articles and Op-Eds of daily newspapers in Turkey and Iraqi Kurdistan including Zaman (2003-2011), Rudaw Media Network, and daily Milliyet. She sometimes appeared in the English circulated newspaper Today's Zaman. Mainly, she writes about Kurdish politics, Armenian issue, daily politics, minority problems, prison literature, and women's issues. She founded DKSV (Diyarbakır Cultural Art Foundation) which is a cultural foundation located in Diyarbakır. She worked and conducted social projects with children, women and the younger population who were removed from their villages from 2007 to 2010.

She also made a TV programme, İnsan Atlası, which was about culture, art and politics.

She is among the council of experts of the Democratic Progress Institute (DPI), a London-based think-tank for conflict resolution, which focuses on the Kurdish question in the Middle East.

== Personal life ==
Bejan Matur, who believes that there is no frontier between poetry and life, and she travels the world like a long-term desert nomad. She lives between Berlin and Istanbul since 2023.

== Books and other works ==
1. Rüzgâr Dolu Konaklar (Winds Howl Through the Mansions),1996, poetry
2. Onun Çölünde (In His Desert), 2002, poetry
3. Ayın Büyüttüğü Oğullar (Sons Reared by the Moon), 2002, poetry
4. İbrahim’in Beni Terk Etmesi (How Abraham Abandoned Me), 2008, poetry
5. In the Temple of a Patient God, 2003, Poetry, A Collection of her translated works (UK)
6. Winddurchwehte Herrenhauser, 2006, Selected poems translated to Germand and French (Luxembourg)
7. Doğunun Kapısı: Diyarbakır (The Gate of East: Diyarbakir), 2009, poetry
8. Kader Denizi (Sea of Fate), 2010, poetry
9. Dağın Ardına Bakmak (Looking Behind the Mountain), 2011, non-fiction prose
10. 四處是風的別墅 (Wind howl through the mansions), 2011, (Selected poems translated to Chinese) (Hong Kong)
11. How Abraham Abandoned Me, 2012, English translation of İbrahim'in Beni Terketmesi (UK)
12. Al Seu Desert, 2012, a poetry selection translated to Catalan (Barcelona)
13. Son Dağ (The Last Mountain), 2014, poetry
14. Guardare dietro la montagna, 2015, Italian translation of Dağın Ardına Bakmak (Italy)
15. Aşk/Olmayan, 2016, poetry
16. If this is a lament, 2016, poetry
17. Det sista Berget, 2016, selected poems translated to Swedish, (Sweden)
18. Çiyaye Dawin, 2017, selected poems translated to Kurdish, (Sweden)
19. Ceremoniele Gewaden Gedichten, 2017, selected poems transled to Flemish, (Belgium)
20. Akin to Stone, 2020, selected poems, (UK)
21. Dünya Güzeldir Hala (The World is still beautiful), 2021, poetry

Albums

1. Yedi Gece (Seven Nights) LP by Kalan Music, 2021, an album of poetry-music arranged by Serkan Duran, Istanbul
