= SamSam =

French-Belgian-Canadian television program

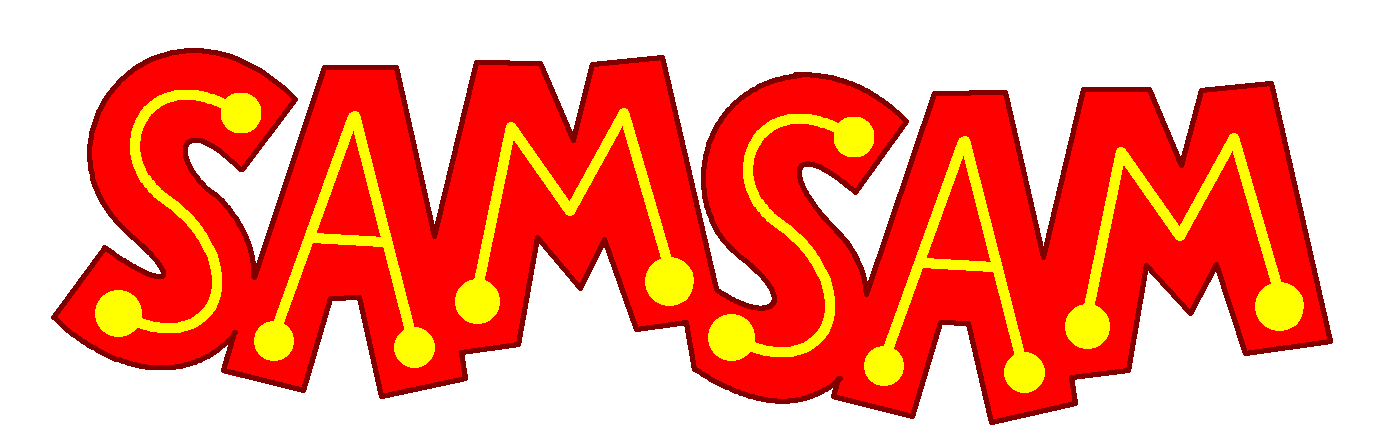
- Genre: Educational; Superhero
- Created by: Serge Bloch
- Directed by: Tanguy de Kermel
- Theme music composer: Todd M. Schultz; Stephen C. Marston
- Composers: Ange Ghinozzi; Bruno Bertoli
- Countries of origin: France; Belgium (seasons 1-2); Spain (season 2); Canada (season 3)
- Original languages: French; Spanish; English
- No. of seasons: 3
- No. of episodes: 143

Production
- Executive producers: Anne-Claire Beurthey (season 1); Bernard Vigier (season 1); Marie-Pierre Cabaret (season 1); Florence Guémy (season 1); Georges Sanerot (seasons 1-2); Pascal Ruffenach (seasons 1-2); Sylvaine Hartout (seasons 1-2); León Perahia (seasons 1-2); Raphaele Ingberg (seasons 1-2); Marie-Agnes Gaudrat (season 2); Mª José Sanz (season 2); Lines Carretera (season 2); Rafael de Cardenas (season 2); Nathalie Becht (seasons 2-3); Damien Brunner (season 3); Didier Brunner (season 3); Thibaut Ruby (season 3); Alexandre Hérin (season 3); Bruce Garnier (season 3)
- Producers: Sarah Delmas (season 3); Pauline Chammings (season 3); Sylvaine Hartout (season 3); Anne Pages (season 3)
- Editor: Florence Poli
- Running time: 6–7 minutes (season 1); 8 minutes (season 2); 10–11 minutes (season 3)
- Production companies: Bayard Animation; Araneo Belgium (seasons 1-2); Grupo SM (season 2); Folvari (season 3); Kaibou (season 3)

Original release
- Network: France 5 Gulli; Tiji; Radio Télévision Suisse (Switzerland; season 3)
- Release: July 2, 2007 – May 5, 2024

SamSam is an animated superhero children's television series based on a character created by Serge Bloch and directed by Tanguy de Kermel. His son inspired him to base the program's eponymous character on him. The series has generally received positive reviews due to its great concept, animation, theme tune, tone, life lessons, quotes, and the main character himself. The series is produced by Bayard Animation, in co-production with Araneo Belgium for the first two seasons, Grupo SM for the second season, and Folvari and Kaibou for the third season, with the participation of Gulli and Tiji for the first two seasons and France Télévisions and Radio Télévision Suisse for the third season.

As well as being a HD program, SamSam is also a comic that is printed in many of Bayard Presse's magazines such as Pomme D'Api (French), StoryBox (English), Leppis (Finnish), CaraCola (Spanish), CucaFera (Catalan), 小小紅蘋果 (Chinese), Pompoen (Dutch), Ого Город (Russian) and Hoppla (German).

== Synopsis ==
The main character, SamSam, is considered the smallest superhero. He does not know properly how to use his powers. He flies his SamSaucer into space to deal with BeastlyBeard and his crew or King Marthial the 1st. He receives assistance from SamTeddy, SamMummy, SamDaddy, SweetPea, SuperJulie, and Megalactic, and sometimes from MuckyYuck.

== Broadcast and viewership ==
SamSam has been shown on TV in many countries around the world and in many different languages, including English, French, Cantonese, Arabic, German, Italian, Spanish, Russian and Portuguese.

In the United Kingdom, SamSam was shown on Action Stations! (ITV4 and CITV) at 6am, on weekends in the Wakey! Wakey! and it also aired on Pop and Tiny Pop. It is also on ABC in Australia, on France 5 in Zouzous in France, and TV Tokyo at Japan, as well as being shown in Malaysia, Korea, Taiwan, Pakistan, Hong Kong, Singapore, Indonesia, Thailand, the United States, Canada, Spain, Italy, Russia, Scandinavia, Iceland, Portugal, Poland, the UAE and Israel.

It has also been shown as in-flight entertainment on Air France.

SamSam has been viewed by a cumulative audience of 250 million worldwide. It has a strong European audience: it airs on France 5 in Ludo, Gulli and Canal J, with a 32% viewing share among 4-10 year-olds. It has aired in the UK on ITV4, CITV, Pop and Tiny Pop and has been the second best performing program at weekday breakfast on GMTV, and the second top commercial channel for kids programming, across all time in UK. In Italy, SamSam airs on Rai 2 and Boomerang with a market share of 36.6% among 4-14 year-olds. SamSam airs in Spain on Boomerang, Cartoon Network and TV3 with a viewing share of 34%, more than the channel's average.

In Norway, it was the most watched early morning programme among 2-5-year-olds, holding a 48.5% market share. In Denmark, SamSam airs on TV 2, holding a market share of 48.8%, more than twice the other youth programmes' market share in this block.

The English-language version of the theme song was written by Todd Michael Schultz and produced by Stephen Marston.

== Crew ==
=== Director ===
- Tanguy de Kermel

=== Writers ===
- Alexandre Réverend (season 1)
- Didier Lejeune (season 2)

=== Art direction ===
- Eric Guillon

=== Music ===
- Ange Ginozzi
- Bruno Bartoli

== SamSam through the years ==
SamSam has appeared in many forms of media, debuting in comic strips, magazines, and books since January 2000.

=== Creation of SamSam ===
Serge Bloch was inspired to create the series by his son, and he loved Batman very much. Once, they made him a prop Batman costume out of cardboard. One time, Serge's friends came to dinner with them, and their son was dressed in a Batman superhero costume with plastic parts. This meeting of two "mini-Batmen" amazed and touched the creator. Soon after, he began sketching in a notebook, creating his own world, which takes place in the superhero universe. Another day, the editor Marie-Agnes Godard saw this notebook, and without her participation, SamSam would never have appeared. SamSam first appeared on the pages of the children's magazine "Pomme d'Api" in January 2000. SamSam has the traits of Serge's son. His name is Samuel, but the parents call him "SamSam". When the creator ran out of ideas, it was enough to watch the children. Some kind of problem at school or a quarrel with a friend, all these situations became a source of inspiration for Serge.

=== TV series ===
After the success of SamSam comic strips, magazines, and books, an animated TV series was developed based on the books with a total of 52 7-minute episodes. It aired from mid-2007 until early 2009. The series was immediately a success. In 2010, a second season was made for the series with a total of 39 8-minute episodes. A third season, subtitled SamSam: Cosmic Adventures, aired from 2023 to 2024, with 52 new 11-minute episodes.

=== Merchandise ===
In 2009, after the success of the first season, merchandise based on SamSam was made, which include plush toys, figurines, condiments, board games, backpacks, T-shirts, sweaters, pajamas, shoes, activity books, books, lunchboxes, costumes, and school supplies based on the TV series. 14 licenses were sold at the time. Cutlery, DVD's, masks, and even armchairs were added to the merchandise line later on.

=== Cancelled video game ===
A video game based on the SamSam TV series for the Nintendo DS was going to be made, scheduling a release for somewhere in 2009, but was never actually released. Only one rare booklet from 2009 states its existence.

=== Film ===
A film adaptation of the same name was released in France on 5 February 2020, directed by Tanguy de Kermel, and written by Valérie Magis as well as Jean Regnaud. It was produced by Folivari and distributed by StudioCanal. The film received negative reviews upon its release.
