= Cristina A. Bejan =

American writer and playwright

Cristina Adriana Bejan
- Born: 1982 (age 42–43)
- Education: Northwestern University; Wadham College, Oxford
- Occupation(s): Writer, playwright

Cristina Adriana Bejan (born April 29, 1982) is a Romanian–American writer and playwright. Her debut poetry book Green Horses On the Walls was a 2021 winner of the Human Relations Indie Book Award, 2021 winner of the Independent Press Book Award, and a finalist for the 2021 Next Generation Indie Book Award and 2021 Colorado Author's League Book Award. Her poems are mostly about the crimes of communist Romania, love, mental health, and sexual assault. In her endorsement of the book, playwright Saviana Stănescu described it as a "lyrical coming-of-age puzzle [that] takes us on a poignant journey into the future via the past, across geographical and emotional borders". Observator Cultural deemed the poems to be "an intense search for identity".

Bejan's previous book Intellectuals and Fascism in Interwar Romania: The Criterion Association is about the Criterion Literary Society, as well as the appeal of fascism to Mircea Eliade and his friends and Mihail Sebastian and Petru Comarnescu's aversion to the political ideology. The foreword is written by public intellectual and professor Vladimir Tismăneanu. The book has been reviewed favorably, praised by Marci Shore in the Times Literary Supplement as a "richly detailed history".

Bejan is also a playwright. The Washington Post's review of the 2014 Capital Fringe Festival production of her play Districtland endorsed the satire because it had "moments that [had] the audience members with tears in their eyes – either because they [were] laughing so hard, or because it's all too real". The play was then bought for TV development by a local filmmaker.

She is a Rhodes and Fulbright scholar, and has degrees from the Wadham College, Oxford and Northwestern University. She co-founded and runs the arts group Bucharest Inside the Beltway. In Washington D.C., she was a Research Scholar at the Woodrow Wilson International Center for Scholars and in that capacity presented her work on totalitarianism on C-SPAN. As a researcher for the United States Holocaust Memorial Museum, Bejan contributed to their Encyclopedia of Camps and Ghettos 1933 – 1945.

A spoken word poet, Bejan's stage name is Lady Godiva.
