= Jajan, Mazandaran =

Coordinates: 36°18′00″N 52°42′23″E

Jajan جاجن
- Village
- Interactive map of Jajan
- Country: Iran
- Province: Mazandaran
- County: Babol
- Bakhsh: Babol Kenar
- Rural District: Deraz Kola

Population (2006)
  - Total: 211
- Time zone: UTC+3:30 (IRST)
  - Summer (DST): UTC+4:30 (IRDT)

Jajan (Persian: جاجن, also Romanized as Jājan) is a village in Deraz Kola Rural District, Babol Kenar District, Babol County, Mazandaran Province, Iran. At the 2006 census, its population was 211, in 61 families.
