= Qarah Tappeh, Khoy =

Qarah Tappeh قره‌تپه
- Village
- Location within Iran
- Coordinates: 38°23′15″N 44°52′33″E
- Country: Iran
- Province: West Azerbaijan
- County: Khoy
- Bakhsh: Central
- Rural District: Rahal

Population (2006)
  - Total: 422
- Time zone: UTC+3:30 (IRST)
  - Summer (DST): UTC+4:30 (IRDT)

Qarah Tappeh (Persian: قره‌تپه, also Romanized as Qareh Tappeh; also known as Qarā Tappeh, Qara Tepe, and Rūstā-ye Qarah Tappeh) is a village in Rahal Rural District, in the Central District of Khoy County, West Azerbaijan Province, Iran. At the 2006 census, its population was 422, in 93 families.
