= Bejan =

Term for first year students at Scottish universities

Bejan (French bejaune, from bec jaune, 'yellow beak', in allusion to unfledged birds, and the equivalent to German Gelbschnabel) was a term for freshmen, or undergraduates of the first year, in the Scottish universities. The term is rarely used today except at the University of Aberdeen; at the University of St Andrews the word has mutated to Bejant (female: Bejantine).

The phrase was introduced from the French universities, where the levying of bejaunium ('footing-money') had been prohibited by the statutes of the university of Orleans in 1365 and by those of Toulouse in 1401. In 1493 the election of an Abbas Bejanorum ('Abbot of the Freshmen') was forbidden in the University of Paris.
