= Ozomdel-e Shomali Rural District =

Rural district in East Azerbaijan province, Iran

Ozomdel-e Shomali Rural District Persian: دهستان ازومدل شمالي
- Rural District
- Location within Iran
- Coordinates: 38°38′N 46°46′E
- Country: Iran
- Province: East Azerbaijan
- County: Varzaqan
- District: Central
- Established: 1987
- Capital: Tokhom Del

Population (2016)
  - Total: 6,143
- Time zone: UTC+3:30 (IRST)

Ozomdel-e Shomali Rural District (Persian: دهستان ازومدل شمالي) is in the Central District of Varzaqan County, (Note: Formerly Arsbaran County) East Azerbaijan province, Iran. Its capital is the village of Tokhom Del.

== Demographics ==
=== Population ===
At the time of the 2006 National Census, the rural district's population was 6,654 in 1,551 households. There were 6,331 inhabitants in 1,703 households at the following census of 2011. The 2016 census measured the population of the rural district as 6,143 in 1,976 households. The most populous of its 20 villages was Aghbolagh-e Sofla, with 1,418 people.

=== Other villages in the rural district ===
- Aqa Baba Sank
- Jajan
- Masqaran
- Nehriq
- Siah Kalan
