= Bakrabad Rural District =

Rural district in East Azerbaijan province, Iran

Bakrabad Rural District Persian: دهستان بكرآباد
- Rural District
- Location within Iran
- Coordinates: 38°40′N 46°41′E
- Country: Iran
- Province: East Azerbaijan
- County: Varzaqan
- District: Central
- Established: 1990
- Capital: Bakrabad

Population (2016)
  - Total: 3,059
- Time zone: UTC+3:30 (IRST)

Bakrabad Rural District (Persian: دهستان بكرآباد) is in the Central District of Varzaqan County, (Note: Formerly Arsbaran County) East Azerbaijan province, Iran. Its capital is the village of Bakrabad.

== History ==
On 19 May 2024, Iranian President Ebrahim Raisi and other government officials were killed in a helicopter crash in this district.

== Demographics ==
=== Population ===
At the time of the 2006 National Census, the rural district's population was 3,000 in 687 households. There were 2,896 inhabitants in 821 households at the following census of 2011. The 2016 census measured the population of the rural district as 3,059 in 984 households. The most populous of its 21 villages was Bakrabad, with 717 people.

=== Other villages in the rural district ===
- Alucheh Qeshlaq
- Duriq
- Karaviq
- Kighal
- Yashil
