= Sina Rural District =

Rural district in East Azerbaijan province, Iran

Sina Rural District Persian: دهستان سينا
- Rural District
- Location within Iran
- Coordinates: 38°34′N 46°27′E
- Country: Iran
- Province: East Azerbaijan
- County: Varzaqan
- District: Central
- Established: 1987
- Capital: Aqa Baba-ye Faramarzi

Population (2016)
  - Total: 5,496
- Time zone: UTC+3:30 (IRST)

Sina Rural District (Persian: دهستان سينا) is in the Central District of Varzaqan County, (Note: Formerly Arsbaran County) East Azerbaijan province, Iran. Its capital is the village of Aqa Baba-ye Faramarzi.

== Demographics ==
=== Population ===
At the time of the 2006 National Census, the rural district's population was 6,549 in 1,377 households. There were 5,417 inhabitants in 1,464 households at the following census of 2011. The 2016 census measured the population of the rural district as 5,496 in 1,687 households. The most populous of its 32 villages was Avilaq, with 495 people.

=== Other villages in the rural district ===
- Abkhareh
- Kohneh Lu
- Sharafabad
- Sifar
- Vardin
