= Ozomdel-e Jonubi Rural District =

Rural district in East Azerbaijan province, Iran

Ozomdel-e Jonubi Rural District Persian: دهستان ازومدل جنوبي
- Rural District
- Location within Iran
- Coordinates: 38°33′N 46°38′E
- Country: Iran
- Province: East Azerbaijan
- County: Varzaqan
- District: Central
- Established: 1987
- Capital: Varzaqan

Population (2016)
  - Total: 15,851
- Time zone: UTC+3:30 (IRST)

Ozomdel-e Jonubi Rural District (Persian: دهستان ازومدل جنوبي) is in the Central District of Varzaqan County, (Note: Formerly Arsbaran County) East Azerbaijan province, Iran. It is administered from the city of Varzaqan.

== Demographics ==
=== Population ===
At the time of the 2006 National Census, the rural district's population was 14,203 in 3,074 households. There were 14,184 inhabitants in 3,753 households at the following census of 2011. The 2016 census measured the population of the rural district as 15,851 in 4,917 households. The most populous of its 40 villages was Kasin, with 2,780 people.

=== Other villages in the rural district ===
- Allahlu
- Alaviq
- Dizaj-e Malek
- Guyjeh-ye Soltan
- Mehtarlu
- Ruzi
- Sowmaeh Del
