= Central District (Varzaqan County) =

District in East Azerbaijan province, Iran

Central District (Varzaqan County) Persian: بخش مرکزی شهرستان ورزقان
- District
- Location within Iran
- Coordinates: 38°35′N 46°36′E
- Country: Iran
- Province: East Azerbaijan
- County: Varzaqan
- Established: 2001
- Capital: Varzaqan

Population (2016)
  - Total: 35,897
- Time zone: UTC+3:30 (IRST)

The Central District of Varzaqan County (Persian: بخش مرکزی شهرستان ورزقان) (Note: Formerly Arsbaran County) is in East Azerbaijan province, Iran. Its capital is the city of Varzaqan.

== Demographics ==
=== Population ===
At the time of the 2006 National Census, the district's population was 33,955 in 7,619 households. The following census in 2011 counted 34,213 people in 9,133 households. The 2016 census measured the population of the district as 35,897 inhabitants in 10,965 households.

=== Administrative divisions ===
Central District (Varzaqan County) Population
Administrative Divisions	2006	2011	2016
Bakrabad RD	3,000	2,896	3,059
Ozomdel-e Jonubi RD	14,203	14,184	15,851
Ozomdel-e Shomali RD	6,654	6,331	6,143
Sina RD	6,549	5,417	5,496
Varzaqan (city)	3,549	5,385	5,348
Total	33,955	34,213	35,897
RD = Rural District
