= Varzaqan County =

County in East Azerbaijan province, Iran

Varzaqan County Persian: شهرستان ورزقان
- County
- Location of Varzaqan County in East Azerbaijan province (top center, purple)

- Location of East Azerbaijan province in Iran
- Coordinates: 38°35′N 46°28′E
- Country: Iran
- Province: East Azerbaijan
- Established: 2001
- Capital: Varzaqan
- Districts: Central, Kharvana

Population (2016)
  - Total: 52,650
- Time zone: UTC+3:30 (IRST)

Varzaqan County (Persian: شهرستان ورزقان) (Note: Formerly Arsbaran County (‌شهرستان ارسباران)) is in East Azerbaijan province, Iran. Its capital is the city of Varzaqan.

== Demographics ==
=== Population ===
At the time of the 2006 National Census, the county's population was 46,833 in 10,766 households. The following census in 2011 counted 45,708 people in 12,228 households. The 2016 census measured the population of the county as 52,650 in 16,273 households.

=== Administrative divisions ===
Varzaqan County's population history and administrative structure over three consecutive censuses are shown in the following table.

Varzaqan County Population
Administrative Divisions	2006	2011	2016
Central District	33,955	34,213	35,897
Bakrabad RD	3,000	2,896	3,059
Ozomdel-e Jonubi RD	14,203	14,184	15,851
Ozomdel-e Shomali RD	6,654	6,331	6,143
Sina RD	6,549	5,417	5,496
Varzaqan (city)	3,549	5,385	5,348
Kharvana District	12,878	11,495	16,753
Arzil RD	4,296	4,068	4,855
Dizmar-e Markazi RD	2,632	2,417	4,091
Jushin RD	4,308	3,637	4,454
Kharvana (city)	1,642	1,373	3,353
Total	46,833	45,708	52,650
RD = Rural District

== See also ==
Media related to Varzaqan County at Wikimedia Commons
