= Arash Abazari =

Iranian philosopher

Academic background
- Education: Tehran University of Medical Sciences (M.D.); University of Essex (M.A.); Johns Hopkins University (PhD)
- Thesis: Hegel's Logic of Essence and the Ontology of Power in Capitalism (2017)
- Doctoral advisor: Dean Moyar
- Other advisors: Terry Pinkard, Eckart Förster, Yitzhak Melamed, Hent de Vries

Academic work
- Era: 21st-century philosophy
- Region: Western philosophy
- School or tradition: Continental philosophy
- Institutions: Bilkent University; Emory University; Institute for Research in Fundamental Sciences; Sharif University of Technology
- Website: www.phil.bilkent.edu.tr/index.php/arash-abazari/

Arash Abazari (Persian: آرش اباذری) is an Iranian philosopher and assistant professor of philosophy at Bilkent University. He was formerly a senior researcher at School of Analytic Philosophy in Institute for Research in Fundamental Sciences. His research mainly resides in nineteenth century German philosophy, especially Hegel's philosophy, as well as social and political philosophy. Abazari taught at Sharif University of Technology's Philosophy of Science department until 2022. On January 21, 2022, it became public that Sharif University had refused to extend the contract with Abazari, apparently on political grounds. He was also the recipient of a Mellon/ACLS Dissertation Completion Fellowship (2015–16) and a Humboldt Fellowship (2022-24).

== Life and works ==
Abazari initially studied medicine at the Tehran University of Medical Sciences (TUMS), and subsequently received his M.A. in philosophy from University of Essex in 2008 and his PhD from Johns Hopkins University in 2017 with the dissertation title Hegel's Logic of Essence and the Ontology of Power in Capitalism.

Before joining Bilkent, Abazari was assistant professor of philosophy at Emory University.

His book Hegel's Ontology of Power tries to provide an account of Hegel's social and political philosophy by focusing on Hegel's Logic.

The book was reviewed by Tony Smith, Jake McNulty, Allegra de Laurentiis, Nahum Brown, Bernardo Ferro, Mario Aguiriano Benéitez, Eduardo Zazo Jiménez, Markus Gante, Sjur Sandvik Strøm, Jamila Mascat, and Shahriar Khosravi. Some reviews were followed by a response from Abazari. The book also received short reviews from Brian O'Connor and Todd Hedrick.

=== Articles ===
- Abazari, Arash (2024). "Politische Handlung und Hoffnung auf den Sozialismus: Eine Kantische Perspektive". Deutsche Zeitschrift für Philosophie. 72 (4). doi:10.1515/dzph-2024-0037.
- Abazari, Arash (2022). "Fichte's Concept of the Body: The Intertwining of Sociality and Embodiment". European Journal of Philosophy. 30 (4): 1488–1503. doi:10.1111/ejop.12777.
- Abazari, Arash (2019). "Marx's Conception of Dialectical Contradiction in Commodity". Hegel Bulletin. 42 (2): 180–200. doi:10.1017/hgl.2018.29.
- Abazari, Arash (2017). "Hegel's Schein as Ideology of Equality and Freedom in Capitalism". Hegel Bulletin. 40 (2): 257–280. doi:10.1017/hgl.2017.11.
- Abazari, Arash (2017). "Opposition Instead of Recognition: The Social Significance of the Determinations of Reflection in Hegel's Science of Logic". Philosophy & Social Criticism. 44 (3). doi:10.1177/0191453717723957.

==== Book chapters ====
- "Hegel's Dialectical Critique of the Nation-State". Reviving Hegel's Dialectic. Routledge. 2026. pp. 223–244. doi:10.4324/9781003724919-10. ISBN 9781003162926.
- "Marx and Poverty". The Handbook of Philosophy and Poverty. Routledge. 2023. doi:10.4324/9781003162926-16. ISBN 9781003162926.
- "Reading the Philosophy of Right in Light of the Logic: Hegel on the Possibility of Multiple Modernities". Hegel's Philosophy of Right. Routledge. 2022. doi:10.4324/9781003081036-5. ISBN 9781003081036.
