= Stefano Bigliardi =

Islam and science specialist

Stefano Bigliardi (born May 11, 1981) is an Italian scholar specializing in the study of religion and science including Islam and modern science, new religious movements and science and ancient astronauts literature. He is an associate professor at Al Akhawayn University in Ifrane, Morocco.

== Education and work ==
Bigliardi pursued his degree in philosophy at the University of Bologna, completing it in 2004 with a thesis centered on Kantian aspects in the philosophy of language of Robert B. Brandom, under the supervision of Eva Picardi. He obtained his PhD in Philosophy of Science in 2008 at the same university with a thesis supervised by Maria Carla Galavotti and Wolfgang Spohn. Bigliardi also received a 2011 scholarship from the Excellence Cluster of the University of Konstanz EXC-16 “The Cultural Foundations of Integration” and worked as a researcher and instructor at the Center for Middle Eastern Studies, Lund University (2011–2013), the Tecnológico de Monterrey, Campus Santa Fe, (Mexico City) (2013–2015) and the Foundation for Interreligious and Intercultural Research and Dialogue (FIIRD), Faculty of Theology, University of Geneva (2015–2016). In 2016 he joined Al Akhawayn University in Ifrane.

In 2021, he began co-editing the Cambridge University Press Elements series titled "Islam and the Sciences" with astrophysicist Nidhal Guessoum. In 2024 he began co-editing with the scholar Adam J. Chin the Wuhan Journal of Cultic Studies, founded by James R. Lewis. In 2025 together with Nidhal Guessoum he obtained a grant from the Templeton Religion Trust for the project “Islam and Science in Translation.”

== Research and ideas ==
Bigliardi is the author of several books and numerous academic and popular articles on Islam and modern science, new religious movements and science, literature on ancient aliens, religion and pseudoscience, science fiction, and esoteric authors and authors of literature on ancient aliens, such as Mauro Biglino, Robert Charroux, Erich von Däniken, Peter Kolosimo, Jean Sendy, Brinsley Le Poer Trench, and Manly P. Hall. Other authors on whom Bigliardi has published include Abdus Salam, Mehdi Golshani, Morteza Motahhari, Maurice Bucaille, Harun Yahya, Sherif Gaber, and Hamza Andreas Tzortzis. In the field of new religions, he has studied Scientology, the Raelian Movement, Falun Gong, Satanism (the Italian group Bambini di Satana), Santa Muerte, and Santo Daime (the Italian group Stella Azzurra). In the field of science fiction studies, Bigliardi has studied the cinema of Antonio Margheriti, Michael Crichton’s Westworld, Boris Sagal’s The Omega Man, and Italian sociological science fiction films.

In the field of religion and science Bigliardi works from two perspectives: sometimes he reconstructs the history of an author’s or movement’s ideas and practices as a historian of ideas and ethnographer; other times, as a scholar of philosophy of science, he critiques such positions and ideas. Bigliardi states that he is not religious, but also that he is not interested in having others abandon their faith; as an educator, he is interested in collaborating with other educators and scholars, both religious and non-religious, in the critique of pseudoscience.

In his publications on Islam and pseudoscience, Bigliardi criticizes ideas and phenomena such as Islamic creationism, the “scientific miracle” of the Quran, and prophetic medicine or traditional Islamic medicine. Bigliardi notes, however, that these ideas and practices are also criticized by Muslim scientists such as Nidhal Guessoum and Ziauddin Sardar. According to Bigliardi, pseudoscience combined with religion is a global phenomenon that should not be ascribed solely to Islam. Indeed, it presents similar structures and arguments under different cultural guises, partly because the same myths and distortions are often transmitted from culture to culture. Bigliardi has often worked with the Italian association CICAP (Italian Committee for the Control of Claims on Pseudoscience), for which he has published numerous articles and given talks. Bigliardi argues that a clear ethical and pedagogical model must be developed for the collaboration of religious and non-religious critics of pseudoscience.

In the debate on Islam and modern science, Bigliardi identifies the emergence of certain authors such as Mehdi Golshani, Nidhal Guessoum, Bruno Guiderdoni, and Mohammed Basil Altaie, whom he calls the "new generation." Despite their differences, the authors of the "new generation," compared to those studied by Islamologist Leif Stenberg, are less interested in the "scientific miracles of the Quran," have a strong background in natural sciences, are not interested in "Islamizing" the scientific method, have an interreligious perspective, and are more open to reconciling religion and evolution.

Regarding Abdus Salam’s views on the harmony of Islam and science, Bigliardi argues that they are not particularly coherent or profound, and that they were advanced by Salam primarily to assert his own Muslim identity in the face of his critics and to provide young Muslims with a reassuring role model.

Regarding the position called Adamic exceptionalism, advocated by authors such as Shoaib Ahmed Malik and David Solomon Jalajel, Bigliardi argues that it is not a strictly pseudoscientific idea, but is based on serious epistemological distortions and oversimplifications.

Bigliardi emphasizes that the literature on ancient astronauts is rife with pseudoscientific concepts, conspiracy theories, and racist/racialist views; however, he believes that the authors of this literature are interesting to study as a cultural phenomenon that overlaps with religion and science fiction.

== Books ==
- 2025. Islam and Pseudoscience. Cambridge University Press. ISBN 9781009608206
- 2023. New Religious Movements and Science. Cambridge University Press. ISBN 9781009108393
- 2023. (with Nidhal Guessoum) Islam and Science: Past, Present, and Future Debates. Cambridge University Press. ISBN 9781009266512
- 2018. La mezzaluna e la luna dimezzata. Islam, pseudoscienza e paranormale. Padua: CICAP. ISBN 9788895276410
- 2014. Islam and the Quest for Modern Science. Conversations with Adnan Oktar, Mehdi Golshani, M. Basil Altaie, Zaghloul El-Naggar, Bruno Guiderdoni, and Nidhal Guessoum. Istanbul: Swedish Research Institute. ISBN 978-9197881326

== Articles and Chapters ==
- 2025. “When Religion Meets Pseudoscience,” Proceedings of the Fourth World SangSaeng Forum International Conference, The Daesoon Academy of Sciences, 817–828.
- 2025. “The Missing Link. A Comparative Map of Brinsley Le Poer Trench’s Narratives and Ideas” Alternative Spirituality and Religion Review, 16:1, 18–69.
- 2025. “Tawaqquf and Adamic Exceptionalism: Silver Bullet or Optical Illusion?” Theology and Science, 23:2, 379–394.
- 2024. “The Half-Baked Loaf: Reflections on Hamza Andreas Tzortzis’s Discussion of Science in The Divine Reality” Zygon: Journal of Religion and Science, 59:2, 474–492.
- 2022. “Gli antichi alieni sono tutti mangiapreti? Del complesso rapporto tra paleoastronautica e religione” in Almanacco della fantarcheologia, a cura di Fabio Camilletti, Odoya, 167–198.
- 2022. “Macchine, marziani, monsignori: Technoscience and Religion in Italian Sociopolitical Science Fiction Films” Simultanea - A Journal of Italian Media and Pop Culture - Rivista di media e cultura popolare in Italia 3:1.
- 2022. “The Unification of the Unifier’s Thought and Its Challenges. Abdus Salam’s Views on Islam and Science” (Essay Review of Abdus Salam. Une oeuvre entre science et islam by Ismaël Omarjee, L’Harmattan, 2021), Lato Sensu. Revue de la Société de philosophie des sciences 9:1, 27–35.
- 2022. “The Mexican Santa Muerte from Tepito to Tultitlán: Tradition, Innovation, and Syncretism at Enriqueta Vargas’ Temple” (Co-authors Fabrizio Lorusso and Stefano Morrone), in Radical Transformations in Minority Religions, edited by Eileen Barker and Beth Singler, Routledge, 225–241.
- 2021. “Mr. Superinvisible’s Potion: Science, Scientists, and Technology in Antonio Margheriti’s Films” Simultanea - A Journal of Italian Media and Pop Culture - Rivista di media e cultura popolare in Italia 2:1.
- 2021. “The Shape of Graves to Come: The Symbolic Meaning of Funerals and Tombs in Science Fiction Films” in Film, Philosophy and Religion, edited by Bill Anderson, Vernon Press, 153–173.
- 2021. “Of Polenta and Elohim. Mauro Biglino’s ‘Ancient Aliens’ between Anti Religion and New Religiosity” in Handbook of UFO Religions, edited by Ben Zeller, Brill, 270–294.
- 2020. “All the Creatures of the Wheel at Stake: Re-assessing Science, Anti-Science, and Religion in The Omega Man” Journal of Science & Popular Culture 3:2, 195–216.
- 2020. “What Osama Bin Laden Did Not (Want to) Know: Manly Palmer Hall, Islam, and Conspiracism” Journal of Religious History 44:1, 49–70.
- 2019. “‘We Don’t Know Exactly How They Work’: Making Sense of Technophobia in 1973 Westworld, Futureworld, and Beyond Westworld” Journal of Science Fiction and Philosophy 2.
- 2019. “‘You Don’t Want to Have That Kind of Thought in Your Mind’: Li Hongzhi, Aliens, and Science” in Enlightened Martyrdom. The Hidden Side of Falun Gong, edited by Jim Lewis, Equinox, 160–194.
- 2018. “Santo Daime Narratives in Italy: Walter Menozzi, Stella Azzurra, and the Conceptualization of Ayahuasca and Science” Alternative Spirituality and Religion Review 9:2, 190–219.
- 2017. “A Gentleman’s Joyous Esotericism: Jean Sendy Above and Beyond the ‘Ancient Aliens’” Alternative Spirituality and Religion Review 8:1, 1-35.
- 2017. “The ‘Scientific Miracle of the Qur’ān,’ Pseudoscience, and Conspiracism. Analogies, Overlaps, and Alternatives” Zygon: Journal of Religion and Science 52:1, 146–171.
- 2017. “Earth as Battlefield and Mission: Knowledge, Technology and Power in L. R. Hubbard’s Late Novels” in Scientology in Popular Culture. Influences and Struggles for Legitimacy, edited by Susan Raine and Stephen Kent, Praeger, 53–79.
- 2016. “New Religious Movements, Technology, and Science: The Conceptualization of the E-Meter in Scientology Teachings” Zygon: Journal of Religion and Science 51:3, 661–683.
- 2015/2016. “Si muere el Hijo de la Santa Muerte. The Symbolic Codification of Comandante Pantera’s Death at the Temple in Tultitlán (Mexico)” Studi Tanatologici - Thanatological Studies –Études Thanatologiques 8, 70–91.
- 2016. “La Santa Muerte and her Interventions in Human Affairs: A Theological Discussion” Sophia - International Journal of Philosophy and Traditions 55:3, 303–323.
- 2016. “The ‘Scientific Miracle of the Qurʾān’: Map and Assessment” in Islamic Studies Today. Essays in Honor of Andrew Rippin, edited by Majid Daneshgar and Walid A. Saleh, Brill, 339–353.
- 2016. “Exploring the Contemporary Debate over Islam and Science in India: Portrait of the Aligarh School” in Science and Religion: East and West, edited by Yiftach Fehige, Routledge, 174–188.
- 2015. “What Would Ron Choose from the Islamic Basket? Notes on Scientology’s Construction of Islam” Temenos – Nordic Journal of Comparative Religion 51:1, 95–121.
- 2015. “New Religious Movements and Science: Rael’s Progressive Patronizing Parasitism” Zygon: Journal of Religion and Science 50:1, 64–83.
- 2014. “Who’s Afraid of Theoscientography? An Interpretative Hypothesis on Harun Yahya” Zygon: Journal of Religion and Science 49:1, 66–80.
- 2014. “The Contemporary Debate on the Harmony between Islam and Science: Emergence and Challenges of a New Generation” Social Epistemology 28:2, 167–186.
- 2013. “The Interpretation of Miracles according to Mutahhari and Golshani: Comparative and Critical Notes” Journal of Shi’a Islamic Studies 6:3, 261–288.
- 2012. “Barbour’s Typologies and the Contemporary Debate on Islam and Science” Zygon: Journal of Religion and Science 47:3, 501–519. 3.
- 2012. “The Strange Case of Dr. Bucaille. Notes for a Re-Examination” The Muslim World 102:2, 248–263.
- 2011. “Snakes from Staves? Science, Scriptures and the Supernatural in Maurice Bucaille” Zygon: Journal of Religion and Science 46:4, 793–805.
