= Hegel's Ontology of Power =

2020 book by Arash Abazari

Hegel's Ontology of Power: The Structure of Social Domination in Capitalism
- Author: Arash Abazari
- Language: English
- Subject: philosophy of Hegel
- Publisher: Cambridge University Press
- Publication date: 2020
- Media type: Print (hardcover, paperback), ebook
- Pages: 218
- ISBN: 978-1-108-83486-5

Hegel's Ontology of Power: The Structure of Social Domination in Capitalism is a 2020 book by Arash Abazari in which the author tries to provide an account of Hegel's social and political philosophy by focusing on Hegel's Logic, instead of Philosophy of Right, as common in liberal interpretations.

== Reception ==
The book was reviewed by Tony Smith, Jake McNulty, Allegra de Laurentiis, Nahum Brown, Bernardo Ferro, Mario Aguiriano Benéitez, Markus Gante, Sjur Sandvik Strøm, and Shahriar Khosravi. Some reviews were followed by a response by Abazari. The book also received short reviews from Brian O'Connor and Todd Hedrick.

== See also ==
- Inventing the Market
