= Farhad Ardalan =

Iranian High Energy physicist

Farhad Ardalan (in Persian:فرهاد اردلان, born 1939, Tehran, Iran) is an Iranian High Energy physicist. He is a professor at Sharif University and the Institute for Studies in Theoretical Physics and Mathematics.

He is known for the proposal of the para-string theory, construction of modular invariant partition functions for WZNW models via the orbifold method, classification of eleven-dimensional supergravity solutions with a quotient structure, and discovery of non-commutativity in D-branes of string theory.

He is also known for research work in superstring theory and Yang–Mills theory.

Ardalan and some other prominent Iranian physicists, such as Reza Mansouri and Mehdi Golshani, have been among the main architects of theoretical physics in Iran.

== Degrees ==
His degree history is BA, Columbia College (1963), MA, Columbia University (1966), PhD in physics, Pennsylvania State University (1970).

== See also ==
- Higher education in Iran
