= Reza Mansouri =

Iranian physicist

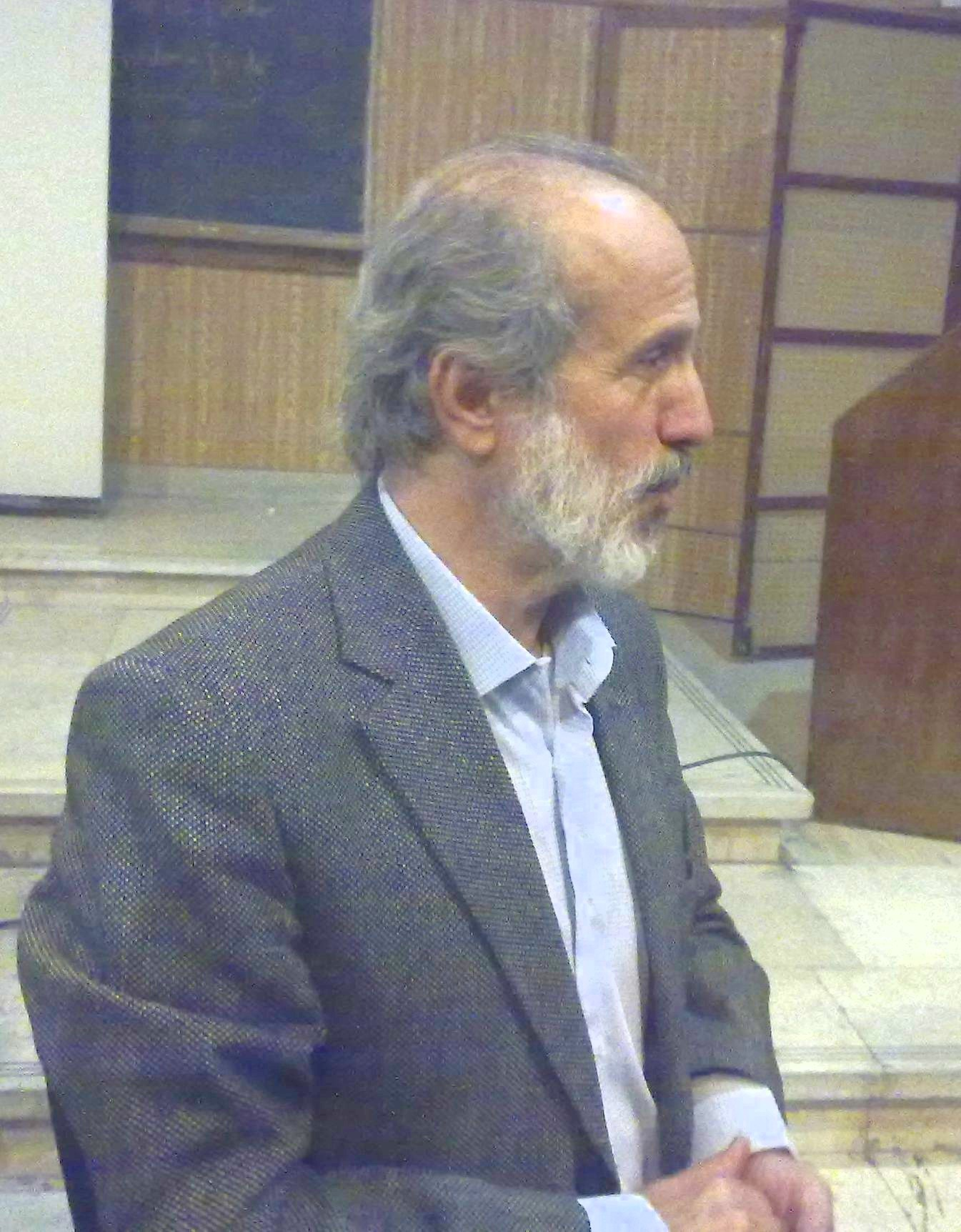
Mansouri in October 2011

Reza Mansouri (Persian: رضا منصوری, born in 1948) is an Iranian physicist and astronomer and a retired professor of physics at Sharif University of Technology. His main research interest is cosmology, gravitation and general relativity. As an author he had written several books and papers on scientific development in Iran and also in his profession relativity.

== Biography ==
Reza Mansouri received his Ph.D. in 1972 from the University of Vienna under the supervision of Roman Ulrich Sexl. He also spent five years as an Assistant Professor there. He served as Deputy Science Minister from 2001 to 2005 and is one of Iran's influential scientific policymakers. Without his efforts, Iran would not have been able to participate in international scientific collaborations such as SESAME (Middle-East Synchrotron) and the Large Hadron Collider particle accelerator at CERN in Geneva. Mansouri has several publications focusing on scientific development in Iran. He has received scientific honors, including the prestigious Abdus Salam prize.

He is presently a visiting professor at McGill University. Mansouri has served as the president of The Physical Society of Iran. He is one of the founders of Institute for Studies in Theoretical Physics and Mathematics and was the head of its Astronomy School for several years, which is responsible for Iran's 3.4-meter national telescope (INO340.

== Iranian National Observatory ==
Mansouri brought the idea of scientific big projects into scientific policy of Iran and started the steps to constructing Iranian National Observatory as the first Iranian scientific big project. He was the head of Iranian National Observatory from the beginning in 2004 to 2016, the time he was dismissed by Mohammad Javad Larijani, a far-right and infamous politician of Islamic republic of Iran. During the years he was the head manager of INO, after a long time about one decade, site selection (an important and sensitive process of finding the best place for a large optical telescope based on several important parameters like climate, seeing, ...) led to the selection of Mount Gargash in the western south of Kashan in Karkas Chain as the permanent home of Iranian largest telescope. Also by his efforts the main 3.4 m primary mirror of iran national telescope was built and polished in schoot, the company has built the main mirror of herschel space telescope and delivered finally to Iran in the winter of 2015. During his management on INO, the peak was leveled and the access road as long as 11 km from the village Kamoo to the peak was constructed. Despite these all-out attempts of Mansouri's team his dismission by Larijani was abrupt and without previous notice.

He published his memories during his responsibilities in "Four years in ATF" as a book and "The Memories of Iran National Observatory 1,2 and 3" electronically.

== Criticism ==
Mansouri had criticisms that have led to many discussions. He is one of the critics of Mustafa prize. Mansouri says that giving the prize to foreign researchers by the current political regime is not acceptable while native researchers are suffering from the lack of research budgets and financial helps.

He also criticized the Chehrehaye Mandegar award. Mansouri states that the credit of a scientific figure is determined only by scientific communities and scientific discourse throughout the modern world, while this award is given to people by political views or goals or by IRIB as one of politically-dependent organizations. He implies that although many of these figures are well-known in their field but only a scientific community have this validity of determining the credit of a figure not political references.

He also criticized intensively the phenomenon of magnifying the scientific character of Mahmoud Hesabi. Mahmoud Hesabi was a well-known Iranian physicist and senator who helped to improvement the education and scientific programmes in Iran in the early decades of 20th century who died in 1991. Iraj Hesabi, the son of Hesabi published a book called Ostade Eshgh and claimed that professor Hesabi was the only Albert Einstein's Iranian student and Einstein supported him by donating financial help. Iraj Hesabi also claimed that Hesabi had conversations with the fathers of modern physics like Niels Bohr, Erwin Schrodinger, etc., and even invited them to a nowrouz celebration in his house in Princeton. Mansouri responded that Mahmoud Hesabi had said to him that he had only a 15 minutes appointment with Einstein and talked to Einstein about his ideas and Einstein answered only to him work more on your idea. Also the theory of infinity of particles that Iraj Hesabi mentioned in his book, is not a real and valid theory, but was an article that Mahmoud Hesabi wrote on relativity and gravitation that was rejected by the referee because of a mathematical mistake. Also based on historical references, Niels Bohr, Erwin Schodingrer, etc., were not in Princeton in the claimed time that Iraj Hesabi has said in his book. Scholars like Ziya Movahhed, Iranian philosophers, and a few other distinguished Iranian figures responded against Iraj Hesbi's false claims.

== Awards ==
- Abdus-Salam prize

== See also ==
- Science in Iran
- Intellectual movements in Iran
