= Brian Connor =

Brian Connor may refer to:

- Brian Connor (pastor)
- Brian Connor (footballer)
- Brian Connor (visual effects artist)

== See also ==
- Brian O'Connor (disambiguation)
