= Abazari =

Abazari is a surname. Notable people with the surname include:

- Saleh Abazari (born 1998), Iranian karateka
- Arash Abazari, Iranian philosopher and author of Hegel's Ontology of Power
