= Brian O'Connor =

Brian O'Connor may refer to:

- Brian O'Connor (baseball coach) (born 1971), head coach of the Mississippi State University baseball team
- Brian O'Connor (musician), bassist for rock band Eagles of Death Metal
- Brian O'Connor (cricketer) (1913–1963), Queensland opening bowler of the 1930s
- Brian O'Connor (philosopher) (born 1965), Irish social philosopher
- Brian O'Connor (pitcher) (born 1977), former Major League Baseball pitcher for the Pittsburgh Pirates
- Brian O'Connor (actor) (born 1953), actor/comedian who played Schemer on Shining Time Station
- Brian O'Connor (artist) (born 1958), American visual artist

== See also ==
- Bryan D. O'Connor (born 1946), astronaut
- Brian Connor (disambiguation)
- Brian O'Conner, a fictional character from The Fast and the Furious film series
