= Bruno Guiderdoni =

French astrophysicist (born 1958)

Bruno Abd al Haqq Guiderdoni (born 30 September 1958) is a French astrophysicist. He is a research director at the CNRS (Centre national de la recherche scientifique), and a member of the Centre de recherche astrophysique de Lyon (CRAL). He was director of the Observatoire de Lyon from 2005 to 2015. His research is primarily concerned with the origin and development of galaxies. He has also written extensively on Islamic theology and mysticism.

== Biography ==
Guiderdoni was born on 30 September 1958, in France, into a Christian family, although he was not raised as a Christian. He received his Ph.D. in astronomy from the University of Paris in 1986, and held a post-doctoral fellowship at the French Academy of Sciences for two years before joining the Paris Institute of Astrophysics as an astrophysicist in 1988, which is funded by the French National Center for Scientific Research. In 1992, he was named research director at the Paris Institute of Astrophysics. He served as an associate scientist on the European Space Agency's Herschel Space Observatory and Planck (spacecraft), which were launched on 14 May 2009.

Guiderdoni completed his national service obligation as a physics teacher at a French high school in Casablanca. He converted to Islam in 1987 after being introduced to it in Morocco. From 1993 until 1999, he was in charge of a television show called "Knowing Islam," which was broadcast on France's state television channel.

He has been described as part of a "new generation of authors" involved in the discussion over Islam and science, which includes such figures as Mehdi Golshani, Basil Altaie, and Nidhal Guessoum.

He has given numerous lectures on spirituality and the connections between science and religion under the auspices of the Islamic Institute for Advanced Study (the Institut des Hautes Etudes Islamiques). He has actively promoted inter-religious dialogue, particularly among Abrahamic faiths.

== Works ==
Guiderdoni has authored more than 100 scientific papers and has written extensively on Islamic theology and mysticism.

- Starbursts: Triggers, Nature, and Evolution (ed.) (1998) with Ajit Kembhavi
- Dieu, c'est quoi finalement? [God, what is it after all?] with Claude Geffré, André Gounelle, and Alain Houziaux
- D'où vient l'univers? [Where does the universe come from?] with Alain Houziaux, Jean-Louis Schlegel, and Michel Malherbe
- Science et Religion en islam [Science and Religion in Islam] (AlBouraq, 2012)
- Perspectives islamiques sur la science [Islamic Perspectives on Contemporary Science] (ISESCO, 2014)

== See also ==
- Seyyed Hossein Nasr
- Osman Bakar
