= Inventing the Market =

Book by Lisa Herzog

Inventing the Market: Smith, Hegel, and Political Theory
- First edition
- Author: Lisa Herzog
- Language: English
- Subject: Philosophy of Hegel
- Publisher: Oxford University Press
- Publication date: 2013
- Media type: Print (hardcover)
- Pages: 184
- ISBN: 978-0-19-967417-6

Inventing the Market: Smith, Hegel, and Political Theory is a 2013 book by Lisa Herzog in which the author tries to examine the constructions of the market in the philosophy of Adam Smith and Georg Wilhelm Friedrich Hegel.

== Reception ==
The book was reviewed by Markus Oliver Spitz, Michael Schleeter, Vivienne Brown and Arash Abazari.

== See also ==
- Hegel's Ontology of Power
