= Ugo Perone =

Italian philosopher

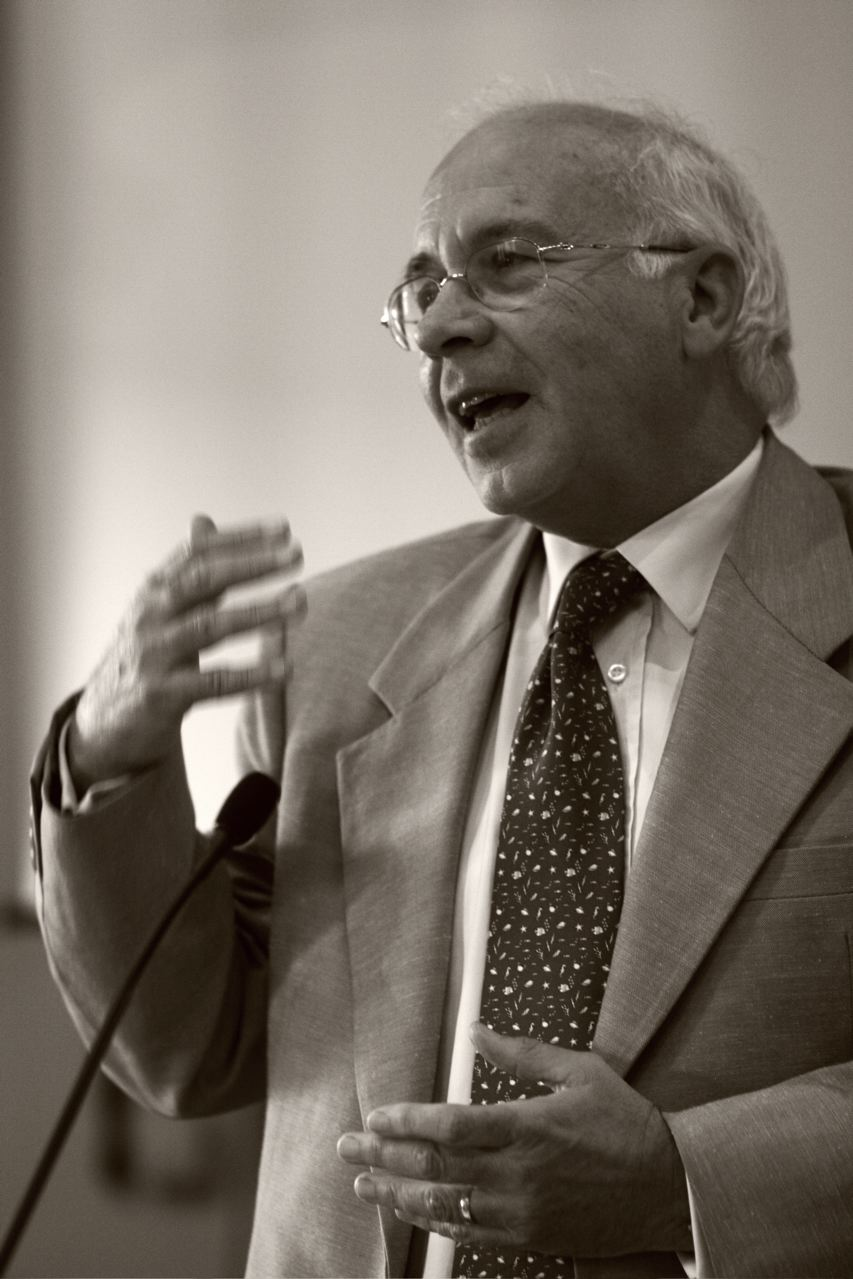
- Born: 16 April 1945 (age 81); Turin
- Occupations: Italian philosopher and Professor Emeritus of Philosophy.

Ugo Perone (born 16 April 1945 in Turin) is an Italian philosopher and Professor Emeritus of Philosophy.

== Biography ==
After studying with Luigi Pareyson, Ugo Perone graduated in philosophy at the University of Turin with a thesis on "Charles Secrétan’s Philosophy of Freedom." The thesis received the Luisa Guzzo Award for the best philosophy dissertation discussed during that academic year.

Perone has been Professor of Theoretical Philosophy and of Moral Philosophy at the University of Turin, the University of Rome "Tor Vergata", and the University of Eastern Piedmont in Vercelli, where he has also been Chair of the Department of Humanistic Studies and Associate Provost for International Relations.

Since 2012, Perone has been Guardini Professur für Religionsphilosophie und Katholische Weltanschauung at the Humboldt-Universität in Berlin.

From 1993 to 2001 Ugo Perone was Councillor for Culture for the town of Turin, and from 2009 to 2013 Councillor for Culture for the Province of Turin. In 2001 he was appointed Director of the Italian Cultural Institute in Berlin, position which he held until 2003.

He is Senior Fellow of the Collegium Budapest. He is also the President of the Italian Society for Philosophical and Theological Studies and a member of the Executive Committee of the journal Filosofia e Teologia. He is a member of the editorial boards for Giornale di Metafisica, Spazio Filosofico, and the Luigi Pareyson Center for Philosophical-Religious Studies.

He is the founder and Director of the Scuola di Alta Formazione Filosofica (School for Higher Philosophical Education), which was established through collaboration with the Compagnia di San Paolo foundation and the Luigi Pareyson Center for Philosophical Religious Studies.

Ugo Perone has delivered lectures at major Italian universities and also in Chicago, Washington, Albany (NY), Frankfurt, Berlin, Munich, Erlangen, Essen, Cologne, Freiburg, Budapest, Strasbourg, Paris, Brussels, Mexico, and Senegal.

His ability to teach and orient his students on the path of philosophical research cannot be disjointed from his way of practicing philosophy.

== Philosophy ==
Recent works are devoted to deepening the possible political dimension of a hermeneutic philosophy (politics is the invention of a new order that considers "for me" and "for all" at the same time); to the rediscovery of a creative morality capable of bringing ethics to a more comprehensive and inclusive normativity beyond itself; the themes of the philosophy of religion, with a renewed discussion of the meaning of secularization; the richness and complexity of truth, which cannot be reduced to mere correspondence, but also includes responsibility for the real.

Ugo Perone's entire philosophical path is inspired by a metaphor, namely, Jacob's struggle with the angel as it is narrated in the book of Genesis. In the desert night, a stranger interrupts Jacob’s solitude and struggles with him in a fight that will see neither winners nor losers. Only, at dawn, Jacob discovers that he has been wound by the angel. The wound also signifies the blessing of a new name: Jacob, the one who has struggled with God and has not been killed, from now on will be named Israel.

The tale is the cypher of the extreme tension that, according to Perone, is in place between finite and infinite, penultimate and ultimate, individual meanings and overall sense. Philosophy has a moral obligation to remain faithful to the finite. This faithfulness leads philosophy never to dismiss the historical conditions of thinking but also never to give up its own vocation to transcend such conditions by listening to the non-immediate, work, and labor. Once it has recognized modernity as its own condition, thinking cannot delude itself into believing that it can find its own position within being or sense, as if no break had occurred between finite and infinite. A flattening of thinking onto merely historical meanings, as if thinking were oblivious to the call of being, would be equally inopportune though. The necessary protection of the finite (a protection of the finite that must be exercised when necessary also against being, which must be challenged because toward that which is strong one can only be strong in turn) cannot amount to the elimination of either of the two opponents. On the threshold between finite and infinite, between history and ontology, a mediation occurs—this does not imply the reduction but rather the preservation of the distance between the two dimensions. In order to preserve the double excess of the finite over the infinite and of the infinite over the finite, one is not allowed to erase the distance between the two by either transforming it into unity or weakening it to the point of indifference.

It is true, for example, that memory can only preserve fragments and cannot claim direct remembrance of the whole. Yet it is also true that fragments should not be abandoned to a nihilistic drift because what is contained within each fragment (which memory remembers) is not a mere instant but precisely the essential (of a life, of a story, …) that must therefore be remembered.

Philosophy is obsessed with the whole, yet such a whole “extends not to totality but rather to the intensity of the fragment in which the whole is at stake.”

It becomes thus clear why Perone’s first books have double words in their titles: Modernità e memoria [Modernity and Memory], Storia e ontologia [History and Ontology]. The issue is that of saying two things at the same time according to the dialectics of the et-et, a dialectics of lingering and anticipation. The later books on the contrary identify a single theme ever since the title: Le passioni del finito [The Passions of the Finite], Nonostante il soggetto [Despite the Subject], Il presente possible The Possible Present, La verità del sentimento [The Truth of the Sentiment]. This unicity indicates that the finite, the subject, the present, the sentiment are investigated as thresholds, as places that cannot be conceived, let alone lived, without memory of the other. As it is the case for Jacob, these places carry upon themselves as a blessing the wound inflicted by the other.

== Method of work ==
Perone develops his philosophy hermeneutically, on the ground of a deep investigation—which often goes against what is trendy at the time—into the history of philosophy and specific classic and contemporary authors such as Descartes, Schiller, Feuerbach, Secrétan, Benjamin in addition to various other philosophers (specifically, Plato, Aristotle, Hegel, Schelling, Kierkegaard, Husserl, Heidegger, Merleau-Ponty, and Levinas) whose names constellate Perone's numerous works. An integral part of Perone's philosophical research is the continuous confrontation with theology, especially the theological thinking of Barth, Bonhoeffer, Bultmann, and Guardini. In recent years, Perone's attention has extended to a consideration of poetry (especially Paul Celan's), narration, and theater, understood as areas capable of offering crucial philosophical contributions.

== Works ==
- "Teologia ed esperienza religiosa in Feuerbach". Milan: Mursia, 1972;
- "Storia e ontologia. Saggi sulla teologia di Bonhoeffer". Rome: Studium, 1976;
- "Schiller: la totalità interrotta". Milan: Mursia, 1982;
- "Modernità e memoria". Turin: SEI, 1987;
- "In lotta con l'angelo. La filosofia degli ultimi due secoli di fronte al Cristianesimo", with G. Ferretti, A. Pastore Perone, C. Ciancio, Maurizio Pagano. Turin: SEI, 1989;
- "Invito al pensiero di Feuerbach". Milan: Mursia, 1992;
- "Le passioni del finito". Bologna: EDB, 1994;
- "Cartesio o Pascal? Un dialogo sulla modernità", with C. Ciancio. Turin: Rosenberg & Sellier, 1995;
- "Nonostante il soggetto". Turin: Rosenberg & Sellier, 1995 (German trans. Trotz/dem Subjekt. Leuven: Peeters Verlag, 1998).
- "Il presente possible". Naples: Guida, 2005 (English trans. Silvia Benso and Brian Schroeder, The Possible Present. Albany, NY: SUNY Press, 2011).
- "La verità del sentimento". Naples: Guida, 2008;.
- "Ripensare il sentimento". Assisi: Cittadella Editrice, 2014.
- "Bild als Prozess. Neue Perspektiven einer Phänomenologie des Sehens". Ed. A. Fabris, A. Lossi, U. Perone, Königshausen & Neumann, Würzburg 2011.
- "Das aufgehobene Gefühl". Neue Zeitschrift für systematische Theologie und Religionsphilosophie, De Gruyter, 2012, Band 54, Heft 3, pp. 229-239.
- "Lob der Philosophie", in „Trigon“, Berliner Wissenschafts-Verlag, Berlin 2014. pp. 13-24.
- "Der moralische Wert der Ausnahme", in „Trigon“, Berliner Wissenschafts-Verlag, Berlin 2014, pp. 25-34.
- "Gegenwart und Gegenwärtigkeit als politische Ideen. Elemente für eine Neuorientierung unter den Bedingungen der Zeit", in Italienische Politikphilosophie, Roland Benedikter (Ed.), Springer VS, Wiesbaden, 2016, pp. 117-146.
- "L’actualité de Romano Guardini", „Transversalités“ 2016/2 (n° 137), p. 71-81.
- "Le principe mémoire", in Jean Greisch, les trois âges de la raison. Métaphysique, phénoménologie, herméneutique, sous la direction de S. Bancalari, J. de Gramont, J. Leclerque, Hermann éditeurs, Paris 2016, pp. 61-75.
- "Die Irritation der Religion. Zum Spannungsverhältnis von Philosophie und Theologie", Vandenhoeck und Ruprecht, (eds. C. Danani, U. Perone, S. Richter), Göttingen 2017, pp. 1-178.
- "Conversations with Italian Philosophers", a cura di S. Benso, Albany 2017, Being, Memory and Presence, pp. 223-232.

== Other publications ==
The ethical-political reflection has become a primary theme in Perone’s most recent work. Among his essays on such a theme are:

- "Filosofia e spazio pubblico", ed. U. Perone (Bologna: Il Mulino, 2012);
- “Das Christentum nach der Säkularisation,” in Europa ohne Gott? Auf der Suche nach unserer Identität, ed. L. Simon and J.-J. Hahn (Holzgerlingen: Hänssler, 2007), pp. 71–86;
- “Lo spazio pubblico e le sue metafore,” in Identità, differenze, conflitti, ed. L. Ruggiu and F. Mora (Milan: Mimesis, 2007), pp. 365–377 (English trans. “Space and its Metaphors,” Symposium, vol. 14, Automne 2010, n. 2: 5-18);
- “La secolarizzazione: un bilancio” Annuario filosofico 28, 2012 (Milan: Mursia, 2013): 107-131

A remarkable part of Perone's philosophical production focuses on the theme of finitude and the relation between philosophy and narration. Among his contributions in German are:

- "Verzögerung und Vorwegnahme", in Alltag und Transzendenz, ed. B. Casper and W. Sparn (Freiburg/München: Alber, 1992), pp. 163–178;
- "Die Zweideutigkeit des Alltags", in Alltag und Transzendenz, ed. cit., pp. 241–263;
- "Das trübe Ich", in Der fragile Körper. Zwischen Fragmentierung und Ganzheitanspruch, ed. E. Agazzi and E. Koczisky (Göttingen: V&R Unipress, 2005), pp. 109–117.

Among Perone's numerous essays, one should mention at least those devoted to the study of Walter Benjamin's thought:

- "Benjamin e il tempo della memoria", Annuario Filosofico I (1985), (Milan: Mursia, 1986): 241-272;
- "Memoria, tempo e storia in Walter Benjamin", in Il tempo della memoria, ed. G. Ferretti (Genoa: Marietti, 1987), pp. 253–284;
- "Walter Benjamin", in Enciclopedia Filosofica, Centro Studi Filosofici di Gallarate, vol. II (Milan: Bompiani, 2006), pp. 1175–1178;
- "Il rischio del presente: Benjamin, Bonhoeffer, Celan", in L'acuto del presente. Poesia e poetiche a metà del Novecento, ed. C. Sandrin (Alessandria: Edizioni dell'Orso, 2009), pp. 1–15 (English trans.: "The Risks of the Present: Benjamin, Bonhoeffer and Celan", Symposium vol. 14, n. 2 (Automne 2010): 19-34.

For the Enciclopedia Filosofica (Milan: Bompiani, 2006) he has written the following entries: Ateismo [Atheism], Benjamin, Futuro [Future], Memoria [Memory], Passato [Past], Pensiero [Thought], Presente [Present], Riflessione [Reflection], Secrétan, Silenzio [Silence], Tempo [Time].

For Rosenberg & Sellier (Turin), he has edited and written the Introduction to the texts by the authors of the Scuola di Alta Formazione Filosofica:

- Jean-Luc Marion, Dialogo con l’amore, 2007;
- Dieter Henrich, Metafisica e modernità, 2008;
- Charles Larmore, Dare ragioni, 2008;
- John Searle, Coscienza, linguaggio, società, 2009;
- Agnes Heller, Per un’antropologia della modernità, 2009;
- Emanuele Severino, Volontà, destino, linguaggio. Filosofia e storia dell’Occidente, 2010;
- Bernard Waldenfels, Estraneo, straniero, straordinario. Saggi di fenomenologia responsiva, 2011;
- Intorno a Jean-Luc Nancy, 2012;
- Hans Joas, Valori, società, religione, 2014.

== Essays on Ugo Perone's work ==
- Benso, Silvia. "Struggling with the Angel: Finitude, Time, and Metaphysical Sentiment," in Ugo Perone, The Possible Present. Albany, NY: SUNY Press, 2011, pp. ix-xviii.
- Guglielminetti, Enrico, ed. Interruzioni. Note sulla filosofia di Ugo Perone. Genoa: Il Melangolo, 2006, 235 pp.
