= Basil Altaie =

Iraqi physicist and philosopher

- Born: March 5, 1952 (age 74); Mosul, Iraq
- Education: Mosul University (1974); University of Manchester (Ph.D., 1978)
- Scientific career
- Fields: Theoretical physics Quantum field theory General relativity
- Workplaces: Mosul University (1978–1999); Yarmouk University (1999–2020)

Mohammad Basil Altaie (also known as Mohammed Bassel al-Tai, born March 5, 1952) is an Iraqi physicist, philosopher and professor of theoretical physics at Yarmouk University in Jordan.

== Biography ==
Muhammad Basil Altaie was born on March 5, 1952, in Mosul, Iraq, where he completed his primary and secondary education. In 1970, he enrolled at the University of Mosul to study physics, a subject that had captivated him since high school. During his studies in 1972, Altaie authored a book on general and special relativity, which he submitted to the rector of the University of Baghdad. The rector sent the book to a scientific reviewer, Dr. Sami Hassan al-Samarrai, who approved it without knowing that Altaie was still a student.

Following his graduation from the University of Mosul in June 1974, the Iraqi government awarded Altaie a scholarship to pursue a doctorate in theoretical physics. He enrolled at the University of Manchester in the United Kingdom the same year and received his Ph.D. in theoretical physics in 1978.

After returning to his country, Iraq, Altae worked at the University of Mosul, where he remained until 1999. Since 1999, he has worked as an assistant professor of physics at Yarmouk University in Jordan, where he was promoted to the rank of professor in 2003. He has been identified as a member of a "new generation of authors" interested in the debate over Islam and science, with Mehdi Golshani, Bruno Guiderdoni, and Nidhal Guessoum, who, as natural scientists, seek a theistic interpretation of science based on Islamic concepts.

== Views ==
Altaie argues that quantum indeterminacy provides credibility to Islamic theism. The universe, according to Altaie, is both extremely predictable and indeterministic. It is predictable, which is why "laws of nature" exist, yet it is indeterministic, indicating that these laws are not absolute. The order of nature, he believes, is evidence of Divine wisdom, and its unpredictability, he believes, is a symbol of continuous creation.

== Works ==
- The Divine Word and The Grand Design: Interpreting the Qur'an in the Light of Modern Science (2019)
- God, Nature, and the Cause: Essays on Islam and Science (2016)

== Sources ==
- Daneshgar, M.; Saleh, W. (2016). Islamic Studies Today: Essays in Honor of Andrew Rippin. Texts and Studies on the Qurʾān. Brill. ISBN 978-90-04-33712-1.
- Yazicioglu, Isra (2021). "Causality, Indeterminacy, and Providence: Contemporary Islamic Perspectives from Said Nursi and Basil Altaie". Abrahamic Reflections on Randomness and Providence. Cham: Springer International Publishing. pp. 265–285. doi:10.1007/978-3-030-75797-7_13. ISBN 978-3-030-75796-0.
- الخلاوي, محمد (2018). نشأة الحياة والإنسان: - (in Arabic). دار اكتب للنشر و التوزيع. ISBN 978-977-488-539-6.
