= IPM School of Cognitive Sciences =

Iranian educational institution

The School of Cognitive Sciences forms part of the Institute for Studies in Theoretical Physics and Mathematics (IPM) in Tehran, Iran. The school was called the School of Intelligent Systems (SIS) until 2003 when it was renamed to the School of Cognitive Sciences. The research is predominantly focused on cognitive neuroscience.

The research programs cover areas including cognitive neuroscience, neural modeling, psychophysics, linguistics, neural networks and artificial intelligence. Since its inception the school was managed by the late Prof. Caro Lucas (School of ECE, University of Tehran), Prof. Shahin Rouhani (Physics Department, Sharif University of Technology), Prof. Hossein Esteky (Shahid Beheshti University of Medical Sciences), Prof. Mojtaba Zarei (Institute for Medical Science and Technology, Shahid Beheshti University) and most recently by Dr. Ali Ghazizadeh (EE Department, Sharif University of Technology).

The school earned recognition with the publication of an article entitled "Microstimulation of inferotemporal cortex influences face categorization" by Seyed Reza Afraz, Roozbeh Kiani and Hossein Esteky in Nature. The article was published on August 10, 2006.

== See also ==
Institute for Studies in Theoretical Physics and Mathematics
