= Caro Lucas =

Iranian scientist (1949–2010)

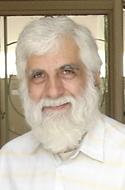
- Caro Lucas in University of Tehran (2005)
- Born: 4 September 1949; Isfahan, Iran
- Died: 8 July 2010 (aged 60); Tehran, Iran
- Known for: BELBIC, Emotional Learning, Invasive weed optimization algorithm
- Awards: Iranian Science and Culture Hall of Fame, 2006
- Scientific career
- Fields: Control Engineering
- Workplaces: University of Tehran

Caro Lucas Ghukasian (Armenian: Կարո Լուկաս Ղուկասեան; Persian: کارو لوکاس قوکاسیان; September 4, 1949 – July 8, 2010) was an Iranian Armenian scientist. His many areas of contribution to Iranian scientific society include biological computing, computational intelligence, uncertain systems, intelligent control, fuzzy systems, neural networks, multiagent systems, swarm intelligence, data mining, business intelligence, financial modeling, knowledge management, systems science, and general design theory. He was honored as an Eternal Figure (Persian: chehreye mandegar چهره ماندگار) by the Iranian Science and Culture Hall of Fame, which is a distinguishing honor offered to prominent Iranian chancellor scholars..

== Biography ==
=== Early life and education ===
Caro Lucas was born on September 4, 1949, in the historical city of Isfahan, in an Armenian family. Although he was born in Isfahan he grew up in Tehran as he explained in an interview: "As my family used to go to their hometown, Isfahan in summers, and as I was born in one of these summers, I was born in Isfahan. Most of my summers have been spent in Isfahan, and I have been grown in Tehran so I am from both Isfahan and Tehran."

He graduated from Kooshesh High School (the school of Armenian Minority) in Tehran, received his M.Sc. degree in Electrical and Control Engineering from University of Tehran, in 1973 and the PhD. degree from University of California, Berkeley, in 1976.

=== Marriage and children ===
He married Emilia Nercissians (Persian: امیلیا نرسیسیانس). Arman is their son.

=== Final years and death ===
Lucas was diagnosed with cancer in 2009. After a year he had overcome his cancer, but he died on July 8, 2010, from intestinal infection resulting from a medical mistreatment which happened during a colonoscopy.

== Academic career ==
He was a professor, and founding director of the Center of Excellence for Control and Intelligent Processing (CIPCE), school of electrical and computer engineering, University of Tehran, as well as a researcher at the School of Cognitive Sciences (SCS), Institute for Studies in Theoretical Physics and Mathematics (IPM), Tehran, Iran.

He served as the director of school of intelligent systems, IPM (1993–1997) and chairman of the ECE Department at the University of Tehran (1986–1988). Lucas was also a visiting associate professor at the University of Toronto, Toronto, Canada (summer, 1989–1990), University of California, Berkeley (1988–1989), an assistant professor at Garyounis University (1984–1985), University of California, Los Angeles (1975–1976), a senior researcher at the International Center for Theoretical Physics, and the International Centre for Genetic Engineering and Biotechnology, both in Trieste, Italy, the Institute of Applied Mathematics, Chinese Academy of Sciences, Harbin Institute of Electrical Technology, a research associate at the Manufacturing Research Corporation of Ontario, and a research assistant at the Electronic Research Laboratory, University of California, Berkeley.

Lucas authored/co-authored about 826 conference papers, 332 journal papers and 39 chapters in books, edited 8 book volumes, served as program committee (PC) member for 96 conferences, and presented invited talks (or keynote speeches) in 190 national and international events.

He had been a pioneer in presenting new multi-disciplinary graduate courses like biologic computing, general systems design, and advanced topics in socio-cognitive systems, where, he has presented courses (and supervised theses) in different disciplines and departments like Electrical and Computer Engineering, Management, Psychology, Fine Arts and Architecture, and Finance and Economics. He was also the founder of the ISRF, Institute for Studies in Theoretical Physics and Mathematics and has assisted in founding several new research organizations and engineering disciplines in Iran. He is the holder of the patent for Speaker Independent Persian Isolated Word Neurorecognizer.

Lucas served as managing editor of the Memories of the Engineering Faculty, University of Tehran (1979–1991), reviewer of Mathematical Reviewers (since 1987), associate editor of the Journal of Intelligent and Fuzzy Systems (1992–1999), and chairman of the IEEE, Iran Section (1990–1992). He has served as the chairman of several international conferences.

== Industry career ==
Lucas served as senior advisor in many organizations, including Bank Mellat, Iran Railway Development Consultants, Manufacturing Research Corporation of Ontario-MRCO, Ministry of Energy, Iranian Bankers' Investment Company-IBICO and Megerdumian and Associates Consulting Engineers.

== Memorials ==
In 2009 Seraj Institute of Technology established a graduate research fellowship in computing and information sciences, namely "Prof. Carlo Lucas Fellowship" in honor of Lucas.

== See also ==
- Adaptive Autonomy
