= Hamid Vahid-Dastjerdi =

Iranian philosopher (born 1959)

- Born: 1959 (age 66–67)

Education
- Education: Hertford College, Oxford (PhD); London School of Economics (MS); Sharif University of Technology (BSc)
- Thesis: Modal Reality (1991)
- Doctoral advisor: Stephen Williams

Philosophical work
- Era: 21st-century philosophy
- Region: Western philosophy
- School: Analytic
- Institutions: Institute for Research in Fundamental Sciences
- Main interests: epistemology, philosophy of mind, philosophical logic

Hamid Vahid-Dastjerdi also known as Hamid Vahid (born 1959) is an Iranian philosopher and Professor of Philosophy and a former head of the Analytic Philosophy Faculty at the Institute for Research in Fundamental Sciences. He is known for his expertise on epistemology, philosophy of mind and philosophical logic. His works have been published in distinguished journals such as Philosophical Studies, Philosophy and Phenomenological Research, Synthese, Erkenntnis, European Journal of Philosophy, Kant-Studien, Metaphilosophy and Ratio.

== Books ==
- The Dispositional Architecture of Epistemic Reasons, Routledge 2020, ISBN 9780367509866
- The Epistemology of Belief, Palgrave Macmillan 2008, ISBN 978-0-230-58447-1
- Epistemic Justification and the Skeptical Challenge, Palgrave Macmillan 2005, ISBN 978-0-230-59621-4
