= BELBIC =

BELBIC (short for Brain Emotional Learning Based Intelligent Controller) is a controller algorithm inspired by the emotional learning process in the brain that is proposed by Caro Lucas, Danial Shahmirzadi and Nima Schei. The algorithm adopts the network model developed by Jan Morén and Balkenius in order to mimic the parts of the brain which are known to produce emotion, particularly the limbic system (mainly consisting of the amygdala, orbitofrontal cortex, thalamus and sensory input cortex).

== Background ==
The brain limbic system

In mammals, emotional responses are processed in a part of the brain called the limbic system, which lies in the cerebral cortex. The main components of the limbic system are the amygdala, orbitofrontal cortex, thalamus and sensory cortex. The primary affective conditioning of the system occurs within the amygdala. That is, the association between a stimulus and its emotional consequence takes place in this region.

Traditionally, the study of learning in biological systems was conducted at the expense of overlooking its lesser known counterparts: motivation and emotion. Every creature has innate abilities that accommodate its survival in the world. It can identify food, shelter, partners and danger, but these "simple mappings between stimuli and reactions will not be enough to keep the organisms from encountering problems." For example, if a given animal knows that its predator has qualities A, B and C, it may escape all creatures that have those qualities, and thus waste its energy and resources on non-existent danger.

It has been suggested that learning takes place in two fundamental steps. First, a particular stimulus is correlated with an emotional response. Second, this emotional consequence shapes an association between the stimulus and the response. This analysis is quite influential in part because it was one of the first to suggest that emotions play a key part in learning. In more recent studies, it has been shown that the association between a stimulus and its emotional consequence takes place in the amygdala. "In this region, highly analyzed stimulus representations in the cortex are associated with an emotional value. Therefore, emotions are properties of stimuli".

The task of the amygdala is thus to assign a primary emotional value to each stimulus that has been paired with a primary reinforcer – the reinforcer is the reward and punishment that the mammal receives. This task is aided by the orbitofrontal complex. "In terms of learning theory, the amygdala appears to handle the presentation of primary reinforcement, while the orbitofrontal cortex is involved in the detection of omission of reinforcement."

== Computational model ==
The computational model developed by Jan Morén and Balkenius is presented below:

This image shows that the sensory input enters through the thalamus TH. In biological systems, the thalamus takes on the task of initiating the process of a response to stimuli. It does so by passing the signal to the amygdala and the sensory cortex. This signal is then analyzed in the cortical area – CX. In biological systems, the sensory cortex operates by distributing the incoming signals appropriately between the amygdala and the orbitofrontal cortex. This sensory representation in CX is then sent to the amygdala A through the pathway V. This is the main pathway for learning in this model. Reward and punishment enter the amygdala to strengthen the connection between the amygdala and the pathway. At a later stage if a similar representation is activated in the cortex, E becomes activated and produces an emotional response.

O, the orbitofrontal cortex, operates based on the difference between the perceived (i.e., expected) reward/punishment and the actual received reward/punishment. This perceived reward/punishment is the one that has been developed in the brain over time using learning mechanisms and it reaches the orbitofrontal cortex via the sensory cortex and the amygdala. The received reward/punishment on the other hand, comes courtesy of the outside world and is the actual reward/punishment that the species has just obtained. If these two are identical, the output (E) is the same. If not, the orbitofrontal cortex inhibits and restrains emotional response to make way for further learning. So the path W is only activated in such conditions.

- TH: Thalamus
- CX: Sensory cortex
- A: Input structures in the amygdala
- E: Output structures in the amygdala
- O: Orbitofrontal cortex
- Rew/Pun: External signals identifying the presentation of reward and punishment
- CR/UR: Conditioned response / unconditioned response
- V: Associative strength from cortical representation to the amygdala that is changed by learning
- W: Inhibitory connection from orbitofrontal cortex to the amygdala that is changed during learning

== Controller ==
In most industrial processes that contain complex nonlinearities, control algorithms are used to create linearized models. One reason is that these linear models are developed using straightforward methods from process test data. However, if the process is highly complex and nonlinear, subject to frequent disturbances, a nonlinear model will be required. Biologically motivated intelligent controllers have been increasingly employed in these situations. Amongst them, fuzzy logic, neural networks and genetic algorithms are some of the most widely employed tools in control applications with highly complex, nonlinear settings.

BELBIC is one such nonlinear controller – a neuromorphic controller based on the computational learning model shown above to produce the control action. This model is employed much like an algorithm in these control engineering applications; intelligence is not given to the system from the outside but is actually acquired by the system itself. This model has been employed as a feedback controller to be applied to control design problems.

BELBIC, which is a model-free controller, suffers from the same drawback of intelligent model-free controllers: it cannot be applied on unstable systems or systems with unstable equilibrium point. This is a natural result of the trial-and-error manner of the learning procedure, i.e., exploration for finding the appropriate control signals can lead to instability. By integrating imitative learning and fuzzy inference systems, BELBIC is generalized in order to be capable of controlling unstable systems.

== Applications ==
BELBIC and its modified versions have been tested on unstable systems (or stable systems with unstable equilibrium point), nonlinear systems, multi-agent systems, and other systems. BELBIC has been used for controlling heating, ventilating and air conditioning (HVAC) systems, complex machines, such as aerospace launch vehicle control, position control of a laboratorial EHS actuator for improving precision in hydraulic systems (electrohydraulic servo valves are known to be nonlinear and non-smooth due to many factors), quadrotor control and robotic machines, path tracking, active queue management among others.

For predicting geomagnetic activity index; the various extended models are proposed by researchers. Babaei et al. presented multi agent model of brain emotional learning and Lotfi and Akbarzadeh proposed supervised learning version of brain emotional learning to forecast Geomagnetic Activity Indices.

== See also ==
- Fuzzy logic
- Evolutionary algorithm
- Neural network
- Genetic algorithm
- Caro Lucas
