= Jacob McNulty =

American philosopher

- Born: January 16, 1989 (age 37)

Academic background
- Education: Columbia University (PhD)
- Thesis: Logic in Hegel's Logic (2019)
- Doctoral advisor: Frederick Neuhouser

Academic work
- Era: Contemporary philosophy
- Region: Western philosophy
- School or tradition: Continental philosophy
- Institutions: Yale University
- Website: https://philosophy.yale.edu/profile/jacob-mcnulty

Jacob McNulty (born 16 January 1989) is an American professor and historian of philosophy at Yale University.

== Life and work ==
McNulty received his PhD in philosophy from Columbia University in 2019 with the thesis title Logic in Hegel's Logic under the supervision of Frederick Neuhouser and Axel Honneth. Prior to joining Columbia, he earned an A.B. in social studies from Harvard College and an M.Phil. in intellectual history from the University of Cambridge.

His 2023 book, has received reviews from Gregory S. Moss, Clinton Tolley, Stephen Houlgate, C. Yang, Mark Alznauer, and Elena Ficara.

== Publications ==
- McNulty, Jacob (2023). Hegel's Logic and Metaphysics. doi:10.1017/9781009067805. ISBN 978-1-009-06780-5.
- McNulty, Jacob (2024). Marcuse. doi:10.4324/9781003307075. ISBN 978-1-003-30707-5.
