= Mashhoon effect =

Effect in relativistic quantum mechanics

In physics, the Mashhoon effect describes the coupling of the intrinsic spin of a particle with the angular velocity of a rotating observer. The effect is named after Iranian-American physicist Bahram Mashhoon, who first formulated its existence in 1988.

The effect considers quantum mechanics in a rotating frame of reference, which leads to a coupling of intrinsic spin with the angular velocity of the rotation of a measuring device. In interferometry, the intrinsic spin-rotation coupling leads to a phase shift that is generally smaller than the Sagnac phase shift, which is due to the coupling of the orbital angular momentum of the particle with the rotation of the interferometer. The intrinsic spin-rotation coupling is independent of the inertial mass of the particle and originates from the tendency of intrinsic spin to keep its direction with respect to a background inertial frame ("inertia of intrinsic spin"). From the standpoint of observers that are spatially at rest in the rotating frame, the intrinsic spin therefore precesses in the opposite sense to the rotation of the frame.

Physical states in quantum mechanics are described by mass and spin, which characterize the irreducible unitary representations of the inhomogeneous Lorentz group. The inertial properties of a particle are determined by its inertial mass as well as spin. Phenomena associated with the spin-rotation coupling reveal the inertial properties of intrinsic spin.

== Free particles ==
A free particle with spin that moves uniformly in an inertial frame of reference carries with it an intrinsic spin vector $\mathbf{S}$ that remains constant along the particle's straight trajectory. With respect to an observer that rotates with angular velocity $\mathbf{\Omega}$, $\mathbf{S}$ appears in general to precess with angular velocity $-\mathbf{\Omega}$. Associated with this precessional motion is the quantum mechanical spin-rotation Hamiltonian $\mathcal{H}_{\rm SR} = - \mathbf{S}\cdot \mathbf{\Omega}$. An observer rotating with angular velocity $\mathbf{\Omega}_0$ in an inertial frame has a relative velocity given by $\mathbf{v} = \mathbf{\Omega}_0 \times \mathbf{r}$, where $\mathbf{r} = (x, y, z)$ is its spatial position. The observer measures the energy of an incident particle of energy $E$ and momentum $\mathbf{p}$. The measured energy $E'$ is given in accordance with the hypothesis of locality by applying Lorentz transformations point by point along the observer's world line. The result is $E' = \gamma (E - \mathbf{v} \cdot \mathbf{p})$ or $E' = \gamma (E - \mathbf{\Omega}_0 \cdot \mathbf{L})$, where $\mathbf{L} = \mathbf{r} \times \mathbf{p}$ is the orbital angular momentum of the particle. On the other hand, in the semi-classical approximation, $E'$ should equal $\gamma (E - \mathbf{\Omega}_0 \cdot \mathbf{J})$, where $\mathbf{J} = \mathbf{L} + \mathbf{S}$ is the total angular momentum and the generator of rotation in the quantum theory. The difference in $E'$ between the Lorentz calculation and the semiclassical one, $-\gamma \mathbf{\Omega}_0 \cdot \mathbf{S}$, is consistent with $\mathcal{H}_{\rm SR}$ once the Lorentz factor $\gamma$ due to time dilation is incorporated into the definition of $\mathbf{\Omega}_0$, i.e., $\gamma \mathbf{\Omega}_0 = \mathbf{\Omega}$, which is the angular velocity of the rotating observer in terms of its proper time. Intrinsic spin thus couples to rotation in much the same way as orbital angular momentum.

== Continuous media ==
In a material medium, the spin-rotation coupling transforms into the spin-vorticity coupling, since vorticity signifies the local rotation of the medium. The vorticity vector $\boldsymbol{\omega}$, $\boldsymbol{\omega} = \mathbf{\nabla} \times \mathbf{v}$, for $\mathbf{v} = \boldsymbol{\Omega} \times \mathbf{r}$ results in $\boldsymbol{\omega} = 2 \,\boldsymbol{\Omega}$; hence, the Hamiltonian for the spin-vorticity coupling is given by $\mathcal{H}_{\rm SV} = - \frac{1}{2}\, \mathbf{S} \cdot \boldsymbol{\omega}$. The effect is very small for mechanical rotation (e.g. <10,000 rpm) but atomic rotations using GHz surface acoustic waves creates a measurable effect, with potential for improved spintronics that do not require rare materials with large spin-orbit interaction properties. A current-vorticity effect based on nanoscale materials has also been measured with similar potential.

== Relation to relativistic quantum theory ==
The spin-rotation coupling is consistent with relativistic quantum theory. For photons, the corresponding helicity-rotation coupling naturally leads to the rotational Doppler effect; moreover, for neutrons, the spin-rotation coupling has been observed in neutron interferometry. The existence of the Mashhoon effect goes beyond the pointwise application of the Lorentz transformation in relativistic physics and implies a nonlocal approach to the theory of relativity.

The spin-rotation coupling can be extended to the spin-gravity coupling via the gravitational Larmor theorem; however, the measurement of effects due to the intrinsic spin-gravity coupling is beyond current capabilities.

== Applications ==
The applications of the spin-rotation coupling include the phenomenon of phase wrap-up in the Global Positioning System (GPS), neutron physics, semiconductor physics, magnetic resonance, and spintronics.
