= Hashem Rafii Tabar =

Hashem Rafii-Tabar
- Born: 1948 (age 77–78)
- Citizenship: British-Iranian
- Education: University of London
- Known for: Computational physics of nanostructures and nanoneuroscience
- Awards: 1994 - Elegant Work Prize of the Institute of Materials London for outstanding contribution to the investigation of nano-scale systems and processes 2001 - Elected number one researcher in nano-technology from the National Nanotechnology Conference 2006 - Elected for Iranian Science and Culture Hall of Fame (Ever-lasting Names) award
- Scientific career
- Fields: Condensed matter; Computational physics; Properties of nanostructured materials including Carbon Nanotubes
- Workplaces: Shahid Beheshti University of Medical Sciences, former: University of Oxford, Tohoku University, Institute for Research in Fundamental Sciences

Hashem Rafii-Tabar is a British-Iranian professor and scientist within computational physics and nanoscience. He is primarily known for his contribution to the computational physics of nanostructures with important applications such as Carbon Nanotubes.

Rafii-Tabar's book "Computational Physics of Carbon Nanotubes" published by Cambridge University Press was the first to cover this field and has been republished several times while gaining a text-book statue within the computational physics. In 2000 after around 40 years of living in the UK, he moved to Iran and started as the Head of The School of nanotechnology at Institute for Research in Fundamental Sciences until 2015. He is now a distinguished professor of physics at Department of Medical Physics and Biomedical Engineering, Faculty of Medicine, Shahid Beheshti University of Medical Sciences.

In 2006 he achieved the title of Iranian Science and Culture Hall of Fame (Ever-lasting Names) for his work in the field of nanoscience and nanotechnology.

Rafii-Tabar has been also active in the research field of treatment of nonlocal elasticity theory as applied to the prediction of the mechanical characteristics of various types of biological and non-biological nanoscopic structures with different morphologies and functional behaviour, contributing to scholarly output such as "Computational Continuum Mechanics of Nanoscopic Structures". He has also worked in disease diagnosis field developing nanosensors for early detection of cancer biomarkers and also conceptual designs for nanodevices that can identify and destroy individual cancer cells. Several of his former students and supervised researchers are now university lectures in Asia and Europe

== Life and education ==
Rafii-Tabar did a BSc., MSC. and PhD at University of London and had held academic positions at University of Greenwich and University of Oxford. He worked and lived in the UK for 40 years (and France and Japan for some years in the interim) before moving to Tehran in 2000. He has lived there since then.

== Academic career and titles ==
- 1984 University of London - PhD in Theoretical Elementary Particle Physics, dissertation entitled "A theoretical study of the low-energy K- meson-alpha particle reaction processes".
- 1984-1987 Institut Henri Poincaré, Visiting Research Physicist in Foundation of Quantum Mechanics
- 1989-1992 South West London College, Associate Professor in Mathematics and Computer Science
- 1990-1992 University of Oxford, Research Fellow at Department of Materials, Computational Nano-science Research Group
- 1992-1993 Tohoku University, Invited Research Professor in Computational Nano-Science at Institute for Materials Research
- 1994-2000 University of Greenwich, Head of Research, Computational Nano-Science Research Section, Centre for Numerical Modelling and Process Analysis
- 2000–present Professor of Computational Nano-science and Condensed Matter Physics. Founder and Head of School of Nano-Science, Institute for Research in Fundamental Sciences
- 2001 Elected as number-one researcher within nanoscience and nanotechnology at First National Nantechnolofy Conference in Iran
- 2001-2002 Ministry of Science, Research and Technology, Head of Nano-Technology Committee
- 2003–present National Academy of Sciences, permanent member
- 2005 Institute for Research in Fundamental Sciences, The Elegant Work Prize for the service as the Head of the School of Nanoscience
- 2015–present Shahid Beheshti University of Medical Sciences, Professor of Computational Nano-Science and Nano-Technology, and Head of Department of Medical Physics and Biomedical Engineering, Faculty of Medicine

== Research ==
Rafii-Tabar contributed to 150 peer-reviewed papers, 6 book and book chapters and 3 review papers. The field of his research can be holistically divided into two main categories: Foundations of Quantum Theory and Computational Nano-Science and Condensed Matter Physics at the Nanoscale which in turn can be sub-categorized into:

- Modelling the tribological, adhesion, fracture, friction and indentation properties of metallic and semi-conducting nano-crystals using computer-based atomistic-level simulations
- Development of new inter-atomic potentials
- Modelling the nucleation and growth of nano-phase films on supporting substrates
- Swelling of crystals subject to thermonuclear radiation
- Multi-scale modelling of crack propagation in crystalline materials
- Multi-scale modelling and experimental investigation of adsorption of atomic clusters on a metallic substrate
- Modelling the meso-scale diffusion processes in stochastic fluid bio-membranes
