= What Is Political Philosophy? =

2020 book by Charles Larmore

- Cover
- Author: Charles Larmore
- Language: English
- Subject: Political philosophy, political liberalism, political realism, theories of legitimacy, conflict in political theory, reasonable disagreement
- Publisher: Princeton University Press
- Publication date: May 5, 2020
- Media type: Print (hardcover and paperback)
- Pages: 200
- ISBN: 978-0691179148

What Is Political Philosophy? is a 2020 book by American philosopher Charles Larmore, published by Princeton University Press. Larmore argues that political philosophy should be concerned in the first instance with the regulation of conflict in societies marked by enduring moral disagreements. He focuses on the concept of political legitimacy instead of social justice, therefore challenging both classical liberalism and recent political realist approaches. In the process, Larmore proposes a model of political liberalism that takes its bearings from the persistence of reasonable disagreement about the good and the right.

== Overview ==
In the book, Larmore addresses the question of how political philosophy differs from moral philosophy. He argues that political thought must start from the concrete facts of conflict and authority rather than from abstract ideals of the good society. In the opening pages, he sets out the book's main theme: because people can reasonably disagree on moral and religious matters, the fundamental concern of political philosophy should be with the legitimate conditions of political rule rather than with the pursuit of a single moral vision of social justice. Larmore develops this approach in the first chapter by contrasting political philosophy's proper focus on disagreement about the right and the good with the ambition of moral philosophy, which is to determine what is indeed the nature of the right and the good.The two fields diverge therefore more than is often acknowledged. The second chapter turns to the political realist tradition, which does focus on the phenomena of power and conflict, but tends to neglect the fact that any political arrangement designed to handle these phenomena must rest in the end on moral principles having to do, not with distributive justice, but more narrowly with what constitutes the legitimate or justified use of political power. In the third chapter, Larmore first shows how to make sense of the phenomenon of reasonable disagreement itself. He then articulates his own model of political liberalism according to which a legitimate political order rests on ensuring that all citizens subject to its fundamental rules can find reasons, from their own perspectives, to endorse them– provided, that is, that they are committed to basing political association on precisely this norm of equal respect for all citizens. He brings these themes together in the conclusion, stressing the view that a liberal political philosophy should concentrate in the first instance on the conditions that authorize the use of political power and only then on proposing theories about the nature of social justice.

== Reviews ==
British political philosopher Thom Brooks described Larmore's book as "beautifully written and insightful," and praised its focus on the conditions for securing legitimacy rather than on social justice. He believed the author offered a fresh perspective on political philosophy that situated conflict at its center and treated reasonable disagreement as unavoidable. Brooks appreciated that this outlook moved beyond a mere "applied moral philosophy" approach to address the "challenging circumstances within which we do political philosophy." He concluded that it was "a terrific achievement" that advanced how political realism could reorient the field.

German scholar Mario Clemens highlighted Larmore's insistence that political philosophy must begin with the problems of conflict and authority, rather than deriving a social ideal from prior moral principles. Clemens noted Larmore's debt to both Rawls and Bernard Williams and concluded that the book reconciled elements of liberalism with a "realist" focus on power. He explained that Larmore offered a modified "liberal principle of legitimacy" grounded in a deeper moral foundation of "respect for persons." Clemens emphasized the book's detailed account of "reasonable disagreement," showing how good-faith reasoning can yield divergent conclusions on important moral and political issues. Clemens thought that Larmore's approach "will challenge both so-called 'moralism' and self-defined 'political realism'" and revitalize core debates in the field.

Lewis D. Ross, from the London School of Economics, emphasized Larmore's argument that political philosophy should concentrate in the first instance on legitimacy rather than on the "pursuit of justice," given the intractability of moral disagreement. Ross characterized Larmore's position as a Hobbesian-inspired response to pervasive conflict, contrasted with Aristotelian or perfectionist frameworks that treat political theory as a branch of moral philosophy. He noted how Larmore's principle of legitimacy required a moral foundation grounded in "respect for persons" without expecting actual unanimous consent about it. He praised the book’s breadth and mentioned Larmore's engagement with Bernard Williams and the historical variability of legitimate authority. Ross said that Larmore's account, while distinctly non-optimistic, presented an "elegant and penetrating" vision suitable for contemporary political challenges.

Saranga Sudarshan praised the book's clear articulation of political philosophy's defining questions, particularly its autonomy from moral philosophy and emphasis on the priority of legitimacy over justice. Sudarshan underscored Larmore's alignment with a "realist-inclined view" while still rooting legitimacy in a moral principle of respect for persons. The reviewer described the book as a rewarding, holistic piece of systematic philosophy that offers a coherent picture of how political philosophy should be done.
