= Bahram Mashhoon =

Iranian-American physicist (born 1947)

- بهرام مشحون
- Born: 9 September 1947 (age 78); Tehran, Iran
- Education: Princeton University
- Known for: Mashhoon effect
- Scientific career
- Fields: Theoretical physics
- Workplaces: University of Missouri
- Thesis: The Gravitational and Electromagnetic Interactions of a Black Hole
- Doctoral advisor: John Archibald Wheeler

Bahram Mashhoon (Persian: بهرام مشحون, born 9 September 1947) is an Iranian-American theoretical physicist who has contributed to the fields of special and general relativity. He is a Professor Emeritus of Physics in the Department of Physics and Astronomy at the University of Missouri in Columbia. He is known for formulating the Mashhoon effect.

== Early life and education ==
Bahram Mashhoon was born in Tehran, Iran, on 9 September 1947. Bahram Mashhoon went to United States in 1966 to study physics. In 1969, he earned a Bachelor of Arts degree in Physics from the University of California, Berkeley, followed by a Ph.D. in Physics from Princeton University in 1972. His doctoral dissertation titled ''The Gravitational and Electromagnetic Interactions of a Black Hole" was completed under the supervision of John Archibald Wheeler.

== Career and research ==
After completing his Ph.D., Mashhoon briefly served on the physics faculty of Arya-Mehr University (now Sharif University of Technology) in Tehran before returning to Princeton University as a research associate in 1973. He continued his research as a postdoctoral fellow and research associate within the relativity groups of Maryland and Utah from 1974 to 1978. Subsequently, he held positions as a lecturer and research fellow at Caltech from 1978 to 1980 before joining the gravitation group led by Friedrich W. Hehl in Cologne, Germany, from 1980 to 1985. In 1985, he was appointed as an associate professor of physics at the University of Missouri-Columbia, where he held the position of professor of physics from 1995 until his retirement in 2015.

After retirement, he returned to Tehran in 2017. He currently serves as an adjunct professor in the School of Astronomy of the Institute for Research in Fundamental Sciences (IPM) in Tehran, Iran. He an adjunct professor of physics at the Sharif University of Technology in Tehran.

== Research ==
He has made contributions to the theoretical exploration of various topics in gravitational physics including the quasinormal modes of black holes, gravitomagnetism, tidal dynamics, gravitational waves, and cosmology.

In 1988, Mashhoon proposed that the intrinsic spin of a particle couples with the rotation of an observer in a specific way given by the spin-rotation Hamiltonian. Its existence is due to the inertia of intrinsic spin. In interferometry, the spin-rotation coupling in general appears in addition to the Sagnac effect that is due to the coupling of orbital angular momentum with rotation. The Mashhoon effect has been experimentally confirmed in neutron interferometry. The applications extend from the phenomenon of phase wrap-up in the Global Positioning System (GPS) to the spin-vorticity coupling in spintronics.

In 1993, Mashhoon introduced a nonlocal theory of accelerated systems in Minkowski spacetime. Subsequently, he pursued the development of a nonlocal theory of gravitation in collaboration with Friedrich W. Hehl, who suggested an indirect approach inspired by an analogy with the nonlocal electrodynamics of media. A comprehensive account of this theory of nonlocal gravity is contained in Mashhoon's book (Mashhoon 2017) and astrophysical and cosmological implications of this theory have been investigated in connection with dark matter and dark energy.

== Books ==
- Mashhoon, Bahram (2017). Nonlocal gravity. International series of monographs on physics. Oxford, United Kingdom: Oxford university press. ISBN 978-0-19-880380-5.
- مشحون, بهرام; باغرام, شانت (2024). در جستجوی فهم کیهان (in Persian). نشر نو.
