= Lisa Herzog =

German philosopher and social scientist

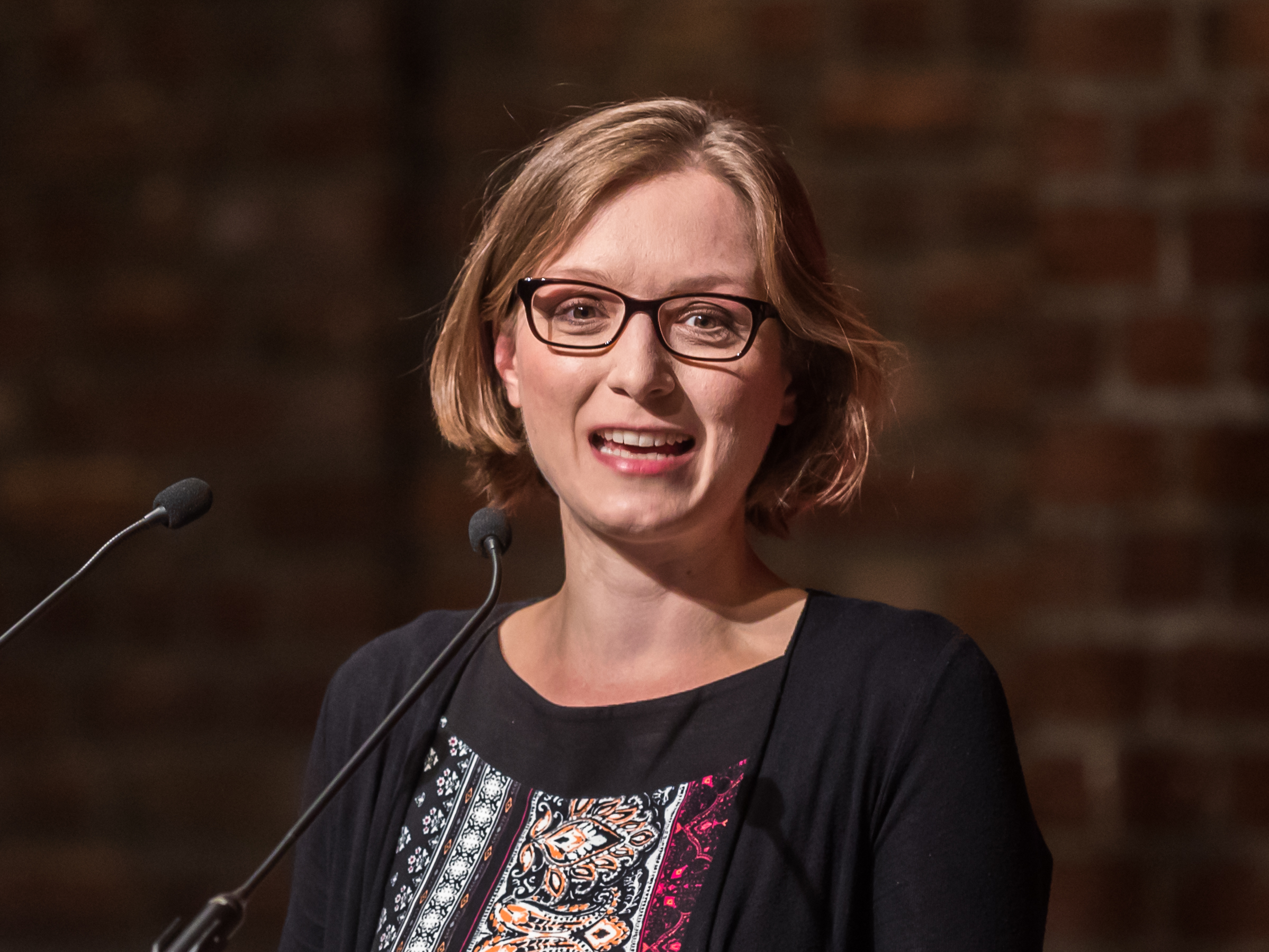
- Herzog in 2019
- Born: October 1983 (age 42–43); Nuremberg, Germany

Academic background
- Education: King's College London (BA, MPhil.Stud); University of Oxford (DPhil); Goethe University Frankfurt (Habil.)
- Thesis: Inventing the Market. Smith, Hegel and Political Theory (2011)
- Doctoral advisor: Mark Philp, Alan Ryan
- Other advisors: Axel Honneth, Rainer Forst, Darrel Moellendorf, Werner Plumpe, Debra Satz

Academic work
- Era: Contemporary philosophy
- Region: Western philosophy
- School or tradition: Critical Theory
- Institutions: University of Groningen

Lisa Maria Herzog (born 17 December 1983) is a German philosopher and social scientist who works at the intersection of political philosophy and economic thought. On 1 October 2019 she began a professorship in philosophy at the Center for Philosophy, Politics and Economics at the University of Groningen in the Netherlands. In 2021, Herzog and Konrad Gilges were awarded the Hans Böckler Prize of the City of Cologne.

In 2025 Herzog was elected member of the Royal Netherlands Academy of Arts and Sciences.

== Works ==
- Inventing the Market. Smith, Hegel, and Political Theory. Oxford University Press, Oxford 2013, ISBN 978-0-19-967417-6.
- Hegel's Thought in Europe: Currents, Crosscurrents, Countercurrents. Palgrave Macmillan, Houndsmill/Basingstoke 2013, ISBN 978-1-137-30921-1.
- Markets. In: Stanford Encyclopedia of Philosophy. 2013.
- Intersubjektive Sanktionen als normative Gründe. In: Eva Buddeberg & Achim Vesper (Hrsg.): Moral und Sanktion. Eine Kontroverse über die Autorität moralischer Normen. Campus-Verlag, Frankfurt/New York 2013, ISBN 978-3-593-39597-5.
- Freiheit gehört nicht nur den Reichen. Plädoyer für einen zeitgemäßen Liberalismus. Beck, München 2014, ISBN 978-3-406-65933-1; BpB, Bonn 2014, ISBN 978-3-8389-0442-9.
- Der Wert des Marktes. Ein ökonomisch-philosophischer Diskurs vom 18. Jahrhundert bis zur Gegenwart. (with Axel Honneth) Suhrkamp, Frankfurt 2014, ISBN 978-3-518-29665-3.
- Reclaiming the System. Moral Responsibility, Divided Labour, and the Role of Organizations in Society. Oxford University Press, Oxford 2018, ISBN 978-0-19-883040-5.
- Citizen Knowledge: Markets, Experts, and the Infrastructure of Democracy. Oxford Academic Press, New York, 2023, ISBN 978-0-19-768171-8
- The Democratic Marketplace: How a More Equal Economy Can Save Our Political Ideals. Harvard University Press, 2025 ISBN 978-0-674-29451-6
