= Brian Connor (footballer) =

English footballer

Personal information
- Date of birth: 23 April 1969 (age 57)
- Place of birth: Taplow, England
- Position: Defender

Youth career
- Queens Park Rangers

Senior career*
Years	Team	Apps	(Gls)
- Slough Town
- St. Albans City
- Marlow
1996–2005	Maidenhead United	368	(5)
2005–2006	Hampton & Richmond Borough	20	(0)
2007–2008	Slough Town	16	(0)

International career
2008	Anguilla	2	(0)
- * Club domestic league appearances and goals as of 22 December 2008

Brian Connor (born 23 April 1969) is a former footballer who most last played for Slough Town in the English Southern Football League Division One South & West. He played international football for Anguilla. He originally started at QPR, but was given his marching orders after stealing boots of pro players. He did not excel in school either just like his friends A Ajram and R Hepburn.

== Club career ==
Connor joined Maidenhead United from local rivals Marlow in November 1996. He became a regular, dependable and popular member of Alan Devonshire's team, playing mainly as a sweeper, and such was his level of consistency that he played in all 61 competitive matches in the 1998/99 season.

An Isthmian League Division One promotion winner in 1999–2000, Connor also won a Full Members Cup winners medal and four County Cups during his spell at York Road, scoring a memorable match-winner in the Berks & Bucks Senior Cup final against Reading in 1998. Connor started 368 matches for the Magpies – sixth, now seventh, all-time – and, after leaving at the end of the 2004/05 season, was given the honour of a testimonial that saw Alan Devonshire return to manage a Maidenhead United XI versus a Wycombe Wanderers XI. Connor would join his former Magpies boss, Devonshire, at Hampton & Richmond Borough in 2005. He re-signed for Slough Town, his hometown club, in 2007. He was inducted into the Maidenhead United Hall of Fame, alongside Devonshire, in January 2010.

== International career ==
Connor debuted for Anguilla, aged 38, in a February 2008 World Cup qualification match against El Salvador. He also played in the return match, his only two caps by December 2008.
