= Brian Connor (pastor) =

American minister

Brian N. Connor (May 23, 1946 – November 8, 2014) was an American pastor and exorcist who also taught people about spiritual warfare.

== Background ==
Connor was born May 23, 1946, in Charleston, South Carolina, to his parents George Connor and Mary Connor.

Connor graduated from the Southern Baptist Theological Seminary in Louisville, Kentucky, and held a doctor of ministry degree.

== Ministry ==
In 1985 the ministry of exorcism was first introduced to him when he encountered a woman who was a third generation satanist. From then on he ministered to people with spiritual oppression. He said of exorcisms that, "when one experiences it face-to-face – when one sees evil, smells it, feels it, has things thrown in his face, encounters evil prowling around like a lion – then you know there's a spiritual warfare going on all around us."

In 1998, after twenty-seven years as a pastor at Southern Baptist churches in Maryland and South Carolina he left his ministry to become a full-time exorcist and run his deliverance ministry. Connor believed that spiritual oppression is a real part of biblical metaphysics, which includes angels, demons and Satan.

Connor stated that even people who go to church regularly or minister can still be oppressed. "By belonging to Jesus Christ, we are forgiven in terms of salvation," he explained. "We can still make wrong choices which open doors within us to satanic oppression by dabbling in the occult, attempting to communicate with the dead, using crystals, accepting New Age beliefs, following spirit guides, participating in rituals." "Anytime someone reaches out to an evil spirit, that spirit puts down roots and will torment and oppress that person," Connor stated.

On November 13, 2001, he appeared on Dateline NBC casting demons out of an American baptist. He founded and led the Good Shepherd Institute which helped spiritually oppressed people. He was featured in Esquire (August 2002) and FHM (August 2003) and seen on The History Channel, A&E Channel, Biography Channel and The Learning Channel.

== Death ==
Connor died on Saturday, November 8, 2014.
