= Frederick Neuhouser =

American philosopher (born 1957)

- Born: Frederick Wayne Neuhouser; 1957 (age 68–69)

Academic background
- Education: Wabash College (B.A.); Columbia University (Ph.D.)
- Thesis: Fichte's Theory of Self Positing Subjectivity and the Unity of Reason (1988)
- Doctoral advisor: Charles Larmore

Academic work
- Discipline: Continental philosophy, 19th century philosophy, social theory
- Institutions: Barnard College; Columbia University

Frederick Wayne Neuhouser (born 1957) is an American philosopher who is the Viola Manderfeld professor of German and a professor of philosophy at Barnard College, Columbia University. He is a specialist in European philosophy of the 18th and 19th centuries, especially of Rousseau, Fichte, and Hegel.

== Education and career ==
Neuhouser graduated summa cum laude in 1979 from Wabash College, in Crawfordsville, Indiana, and received his Ph.D. from Columbia University. He taught at Harvard University, University of California, San Diego, Cornell University, and Johann Wolfgang Goethe University Frankfurt am Main before returning to the Barnard/Columbia faculty.

He was elected a Fellow of the American Academy of Arts & Sciences in 2021.

== Philosophical work ==
Neuhouser's focus is on German Idealism and continental social theory. He has published Fichte's Theory of Subjectivity (Cambridge University Press, 1990); Foundations of Hegel's Social Theory: Actualizing Freedom (Harvard University Press, 2000), which argues for the centrality of "social freedom" in Hegel's political thought; Rousseau's Theodicy of Self-Love: Evil, Rationality, and the Drive for Recognition (Oxford University Press, 2008); and Rousseau's Critique of Inequality: Reconstructing the Second Discourse (Cambridge University Press, 2014).

His latest work, Diagnosing Social Pathology: Rousseau, Hegel, Marx and Durkheim (Cambridge University Press, 2023), centers on notions of "social pathology" in 18th, 19th, and 20th-century philosophy.
