= Philosophy & Social Criticism =

Philosophy and Social Criticism
- Discipline: Philosophy
- Language: English
- Edited by: David Rasmussen

Publication details
- Former name: Cultural Hermeneutics
- History: 1973–present
- Publisher: SAGE Publications
- Frequency: 9/year
- Impact factor: 0.158 (2014)

Standard abbreviations
- ISO 4: Philos. Soc. Crit.

Indexing
- ISSN: 0191-4537 (print); 1461-734X (web)
- LCCN: 79642755
- OCLC no.: 174426943

Links
- Journal homepage; Online access; Online archive

Philosophy & Social Criticism is a peer-reviewed academic journal that publishes papers nine times a year in the field of philosophy. The editor-in-chief is David Rasmussen (Boston College). It was established in 1973 and is currently published by SAGE Publications.

== Abstracting and indexing ==
Philosophy & Social Criticism is abstracted and indexed in:

- Academic Premier
- Alternative Press Index
- Current Contents/Social and Behavioral Sciences
- Current Legal Sociology
- FRANCIS
- Social Sciences Citation Index
