= Mount Gargash =

Mountain in Kashan County, Iran

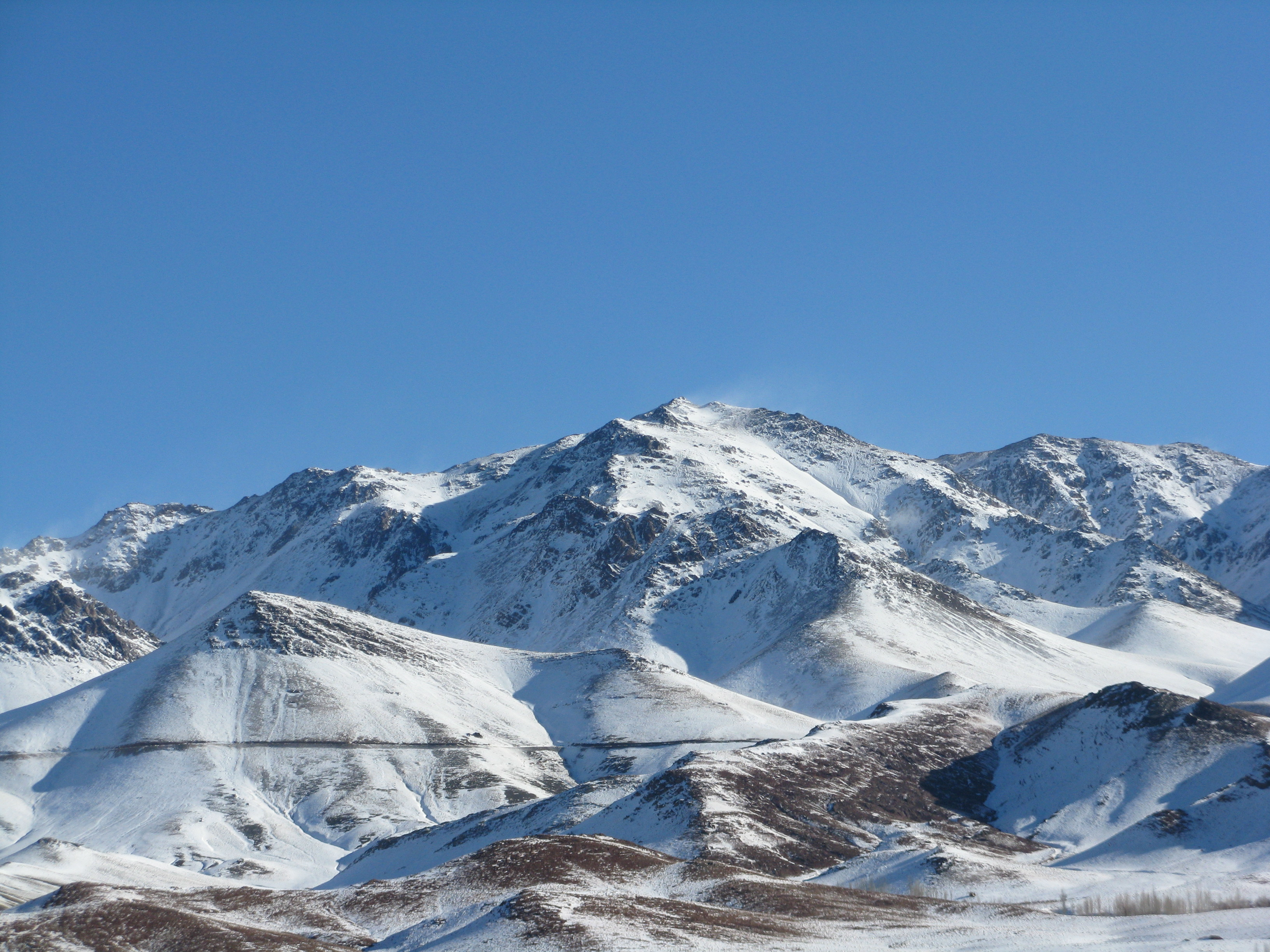
Mount Gargash

Mount Gargash is located in Isfahan province, 30 km South Kashan in Iran near the towns of Kamu and Choghan. The peak has an altitude of 3,600 metres (11,800 ft) and is the home to the Iranian National Observatory. The peak was chosen as the outcome of a site selection campaign for the national observatory project in 2008, and is known for its low atmospheric turbulence thus suitable for astronomical observations. Mount Gargash is located in a protected zone for the conservation of its wildlife. A dedicated road opened to access the mountain in 2016.
