= Charles Larmore =

American philosopher (born 1950)

- Born: Charles Everett Larmore; March 23, 1950 (age 76)

Education
- Education: Yale University (PhD)
- Thesis: Scientific Theory and Experience (1978)
- Doctoral advisor: Robert Fogelin

Philosophical work
- Era: Contemporary philosophy
- Region: Western philosophy
- School: Analytic
- Institutions: Brown University
- Doctoral students: Frederick Neuhouser
- Main interests: Political philosophy, ethics

Charles Everett Larmore (born 23 March 1950) is an American philosopher. He is the W. Duncan MacMillan Family Professor of the Humanities and Professor of Philosophy at Brown University, noted for his writings on political liberalism as well as on various topics in moral philosophy and the history of philosophy.

== Education and career ==
Larmore received his A.B. at Harvard (1972) and his Ph.D. at Yale (1978). He taught for many years in the philosophy department at Columbia University, and then as the Chester D. Tripp Professor and the Raymond W. & Martha Hilpert Gruner Distinguished Service Professor at the University of Chicago in philosophy and political science.

== Philosophical work ==
He has been a defender of political liberalism along with John Rawls, as well as a contributor to moral philosophy (moral realism, the nature of the self) and to the history of philosophy from the 16th to the 20th centuries (including such figures as Montaigne, Descartes, Bayle, Kant, Hölderlin, Schopenhauer, Nietzsche, Sartre). His most recent work focuses on the nature of reason and reasons.

== Prizes, awards and membership in societies ==
- Grand Prix de Philosophie from the Académie française (2004) for Les Pratiques du Moi
- Member of the American Academy of Arts and Sciences (Elected May 2005)
- Gadamer Prize (2022)

== Selected publications ==
- Larmore, C. (1987) Patterns of Moral Complexity, Cambridge University Press
- Larmore, C. (1993) Modernité et morale, Presses Universitaires de France
- Larmore, C. (1996) The Morals of Modernity, Cambridge University Press.
- Larmore, C. (1996) The Romantic Legacy, Columbia University Press
- Larmore, C. (2004) Les pratiques du moi, Presses Universitaires de France (English translation: Practices of the Self, 2010, University of Chicago Press ISBN 9780226468877)
- Larmore, C. (2004) Débat sur l'éthique. Idéalisme ou réalisme (with Alain Renaut), Grasset
- Larmore, C. (2008) The Autonomy of Morality, Cambridge University Press
- Larmore, C. (2008) Dare ragioni. Il soggetto, l'etica, la politica, Rosenberg & Sellier, Torino
- Larmore, C. (2009) Dernières nouvelles du moi (with Vincent Descombes), Presses Universitaires de France
- Larmore, C. (2012) Vernunft und Subjektivität, Suhrkamp Verlag
- Larmore, C. (2017) Das Selbst in seinem Verhältnis zu sich und zu anderen, Klostermann Verlag (Rote Reihe)
- Larmore, C. (2020) What Is Political Philosophy?, Princeton University Press
- Larmore, C. (2021) Morality and Metaphysics, Cambridge University Press
- Larmore, C. (2022) De raisonnables désaccords, Petits Platons, Paris
- Larmore, C. (2026) La réalité du bien, Editions Hermann, Paris
