= Allegra de Laurentiis =

European philosopher

Academic background
- Education: Università La Sapienza, Roma (Laurea); Universität Frankfurt (MA and PhD)
- Thesis: Marx' und Engels' Rezeption der Hegelschen Kantkritik : ein Widerspruch im Materialismus (1983)

Academic work
- Discipline: Philosophy
- Institutions: Stony Brook University

Allegra de Laurentiis is an Italian philosopher, educated at the Universities of Rome, Tübingen and Frankfurt, who has been teaching at American universities since 1987. She is now a Professor of Philosophy at Stony Brook University. She is known for her works on philosophy of Hegel. De Laurentiis was the president of Hegel Society of America from 2014 to 2018.

== Books ==
- 'Marx und Engels' Rezeption der Hegelschen Kantkritik. Ein Widerspruch im Materialismus. [Marx' and Engels' Appropriation of Hegel’s Kant Criticism. A Contradiction in Materialism.] Frankfurt: Peter Lang, Europäische Hochschulschriften, XX/108, 1983.
- Subjects in the Ancient and Modern World. On Hegel’s Theory of Subjectivity. Basingstoke, UK: Palgrave-MacMillan, 2005
- The Bloomsbury Companion to Hegel. Co-edited with Jeffrey Edwards. London/NY: Bloomsbury, 2013, 2015
- Hegel’s Anthropology. Life, Psyche, and Second Nature. Evanston, IL: Northwestern University Press, 2021
- "Hegel and Metaphysics: On Logic and Ontology in the System", Hegel and Metaphysics, De Gruyter, 2016-04-25, doi:10.1515/9783110424447, ISBN 978-3-11-042444-7
- Kleine Schriften III. Arbeiten zu Hegel und verwandten Themen. Vol. 3 of Manfred Baum kleine Schriften. Co-edited with Jeffrey Edwards. Berlin/Boston: DeGruyter, 2020.
