= Manfred Baum =

German philosopher (born 1939)

Manfred Baum (born 15 April 1939 in Cologne) is a German philosopher and second chairman of the German Kant Society. In 1993, he was appointed professor of philosophy at the University of Wuppertal, where he continues to teach after his retirement.

His research focuses on the philosophy of Immanuel Kant. However, ancient philosophy, the Enlightenment, German Idealism, and Marxist theory have also regularly been the subjects of his publications and teaching.

== Life ==
Baum studied English, German, education, and philosophy in Cologne and Munich from 1958 to 1970. He earned his doctorate in 1970 with a dissertation titled Die transzendentale Deduktion in Kants Kritiken. Interpretationen zur kritischen Philosophie under Karl-Heinz Volkmann-Schluck and Ludwig Landgrebe.

After working at the Hegel Archive at the Ruhr University Bochum, he completed his habilitation in 1981 at the University of Siegen with a study titled Die Entstehung der Hegelschen Dialektik.

Since 1996, he has been co-editor of the journal Kant-Studien.

== Selected publications ==
=== Books ===
- Die transzendentale Deduktion in Kants Kritiken: Interpretationen zur kritischen Philosophie. Hochschulschrift, Dissertation, Universität zu Köln 1975.
- Deduktion und Beweis in Kants Transzendentalphilosophie: Untersuchungen zur Kritik der reinen Vernunft (in German). Hain Verlag bei Athenäum. 1986. ISBN 978-3-445-02352-0.
- Die Entstehung der Hegelschen Dialektik (in German). Bouvier. 1986. ISBN 978-3-416-01996-5.
- Baum, Manfred (2019-05-20), "Kleine Schriften 1: Arbeiten zur theoretischen Philosophie Kants", in Heinz, Marion (ed.), Band 1 (in German), De Gruyter, doi:10.1515/9783110605327, ISBN 978-3-11-060532-7
- Baum, Manfred (2020-01-20). Hüning, Dieter (ed.). Kleine Schriften 2: Arbeiten zur praktischen Philosophie Kants. De Gruyter. doi:10.1515/9783110605426. ISBN 978-3-11-060542-6.
- Baum, Manfred (2020-07-06). Laurentiis, Allegra de; Edwards, Jeffrey (eds.). Kleine Schriften 3: Arbeiten zu Hegel und verwandten Themen (in German). De Gruyter. doi:10.1515/9783110605501. ISBN 978-3-11-060550-1.

=== Articles ===
- Baum, Manfred (1987). "The B-Deduction and the Refutation of Idealism". The Southern Journal of Philosophy. 25 (S1): 89–107. doi:10.1111/j.2041-6962.1987.tb01654.x. ISSN 2041-6962.

=== Editions ===
- Georg Wilhelm Friedrich Hegel: Gesammelte Werke. In Verbindung mit der Deutschen Forschungsgemeinschaft hrsg. v. der Rheinisch-Westfälischen Akademie der Wissenschaften. Band 5. Schriften und Entwürfe 1799 -1808. Hamburg (Verlag Felix Meiner) 1998.
- Transzendenz und Existenz. Idealistische Grundlagen und moderne Perspektiven des transzendentalen Gedankens. FS Wolfgang Janke. Hrsg. v. M. Baum und K. Hammacher. Amsterdam -Atlanta, GA 2001.

=== Literature on Manfred Baum ===
- Doyé, Sabine; Heinz, Marion; Rameil, Udo, eds. (2021-06-21), "Metaphysik und Kritik: Festschrift für Manfred Baum zum 65. Geburtstag", Metaphysik und Kritik (in German), De Gruyter, doi:10.1515/9783110889475, ISBN 978-3-11-088947-5
