= Hent de Vries =

Dutch philosopher and academic

Hent de Vries Hent de Vries
- Born: Hendrik de Vries; 24 February 1958 (age 68); Uitgeest

Academic background
- Education: Leiden University (PhD)
- Thesis: Theologie im Pianissimo & zwischen Rationalität und Dekonstruktion : die Aktualität der Denkfiguren Adornos und Levinas' (1989)

Academic work
- Institutions: New York University; University of Amsterdam

Hendrik "Hent" de Vries (born 24 February 1958, is a Dutch philosopher, Professor of German, Religious Studies, and Comparative Literature and Affiliated Professor of Philosophy at New York University, and Professor of Philosophy at the University of Amsterdam. De Vries has been instrumental in explaining the apophatic and other theological claims and dimensions of deconstruction and for demonstrating its import for an understanding of religion in contemporary philosophy and culture.

== Selected bibliography ==
=== Books ===
- de Vries, Hent; Weber, Samuel (1997). Violence, identity, and self-determination. Stanford, California: Stanford University Press. ISBN 9780804729963.
- de Vries, Hent (1999). Philosophy and the turn to religion. Baltimore, Maryland: Johns Hopkins University Press. ISBN 9780801859953.
- de Vries, Hent (2002). Religion and violence: philosophical perspectives from Kant to Derrida. Baltimore: Johns Hopkins University Press. ISBN 9780801867682.
- de Vries, Hent (2005). Minimal theologies: critiques of secular reason in Adorno and Levinas. Translated by Hale, Geoffrey. Baltimore: Johns Hopkins University Press. ISBN 9780801880179.
- de Vries, Hent; Sullivan, Lawrence E. (2006). Political theologies public religions in a post-secular world. New York: Fordham University Press. ISBN 9780823226450.
- de Vries, Hent (2006). Political theologies public religions in a post-secular world. New York: Fordham University Press. ISBN 9780823226450.
- de Vries, Hent (2008). Religion: beyond a concept. New York: Fordham University Press. ISBN 9780823227259.

=== Chapters in books ===
- de Vries, Hent (2001), "Derrida and ethics: hospitable thought", in Cohen, Tom (ed.), Jacques Derrida and the humanities a critical reader, Cambridge, U.K. New York: Cambridge University Press, pp. 172–192, ISBN 9780521625654

=== Journal articles ===
- de Vries, Hent (April 1992). "Anti-babel: the 'mystical postulate' in Benjamin, de Certeau and Derrida". MLN. 107 (3): 441–477. doi:10.2307/2904942. JSTOR 2904942.
