= Elena Ficara =

Italian philosopher

Academic background
- Education: University of Turin; University of Cologne (PhD)
- Thesis: Die Ontologie in der "Kritik der reinen Vernunft" (2006)
- Doctoral advisor: Klaus Düsing

Academic work
- Era: Contemporary philosophy
- Region: Western philosophy
- School or tradition: German Idealism
- Institutions: Paderborn University

Elena Ficara (born 1974) is an associate professor of philosophy at Paderborn University.

== Life and work ==
Ficara studied philosophy from 1993 to 2000 at the University of Turin and received her PhD in philosophy from the University of Cologne in 2006, and subsequently her habilitation at Paderborn University in 2018.

== Selected publications ==
=== Monographs ===
- Ficara, Elena (2020). The Form of Truth. De Gruyter. doi:10.1515/9783110703719. ISBN 978-3-11-070371-9.
- Ficara, Elena (2010). Heidegger e il problema della metafisica. Roma: Casini. ISBN 978-88-7905-162-0. OL 30474825M.
- Ficara, Elena (2006). Die Ontologie in der "Kritik der reinen Vernunft" (in German). Königshausen & Neumann. ISBN 978-3-8260-3231-8.

=== Edited volumes ===
- Ficara, Elena; Priest, Graham (2023). The Formalization of Dialectics. London: Routledge. doi:10.4324/9781032631677. ISBN 978-1-032-63167-7.
- Ficara, Elena, ed. (2014). Contradictions: Logic, History, Actuality. DE GRUYTER. doi:10.1515/9783110340822. ISBN 978-3-11-033574-3.
- Ficara, Elena, ed. (2012). Skeptizismus und Philosophie: Kant, Fichte, Hegel. BRILL. doi:10.1163/9789401207911. ISBN 978-94-012-0791-1.
