= Iranian National Observatory =

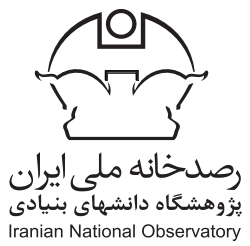

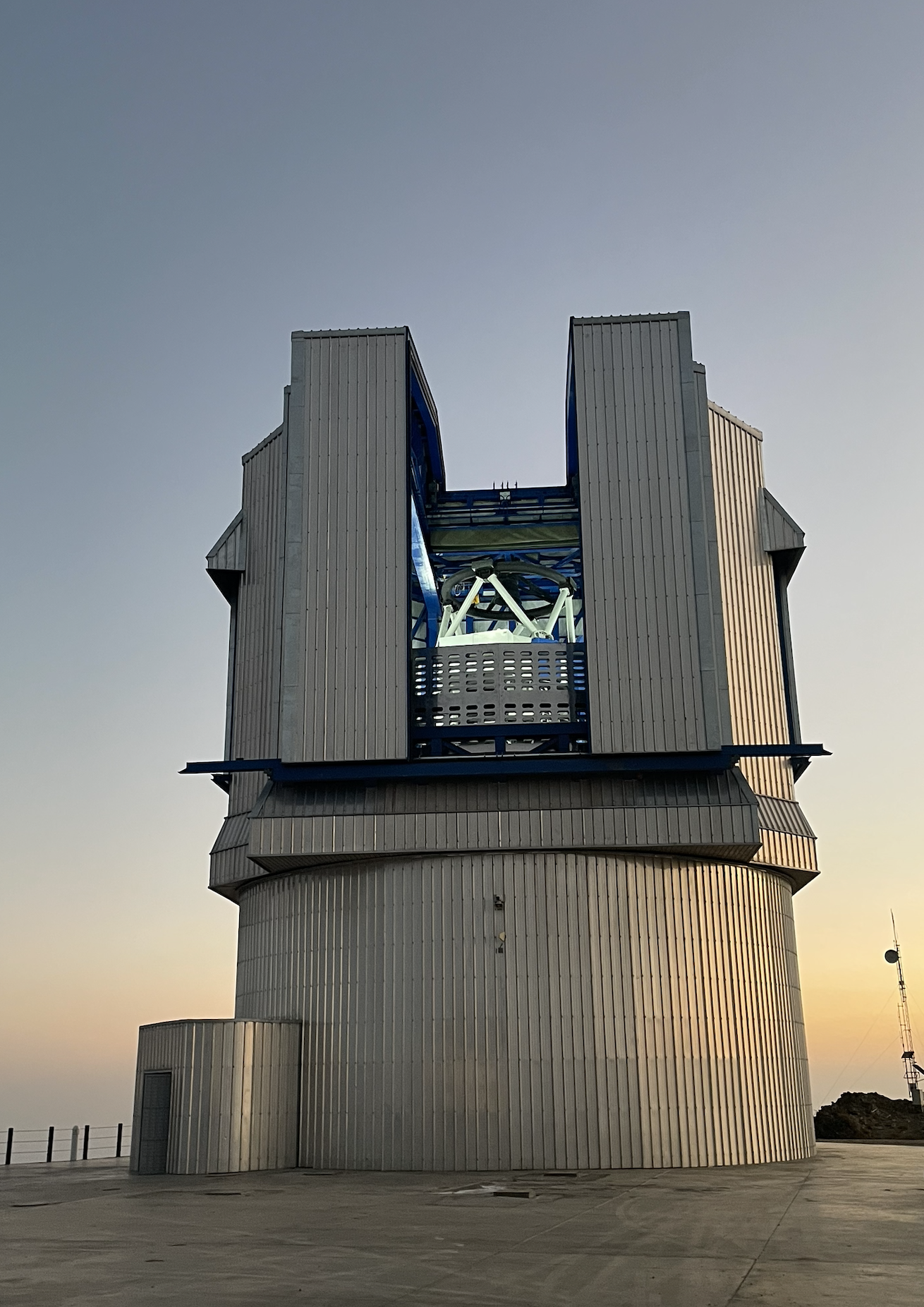
- Alternative names: INO
- Location: Qamsar District, Kashan County, Isfahan Province, Iran
- Coordinates: 33°40′28″N 51°19′08″E
- Altitude: 3,600 m (11,800 ft)
- Established: 28 June 2021
- Website: ino.org.ir
- Telescopes: INO340
- Related media on Commons

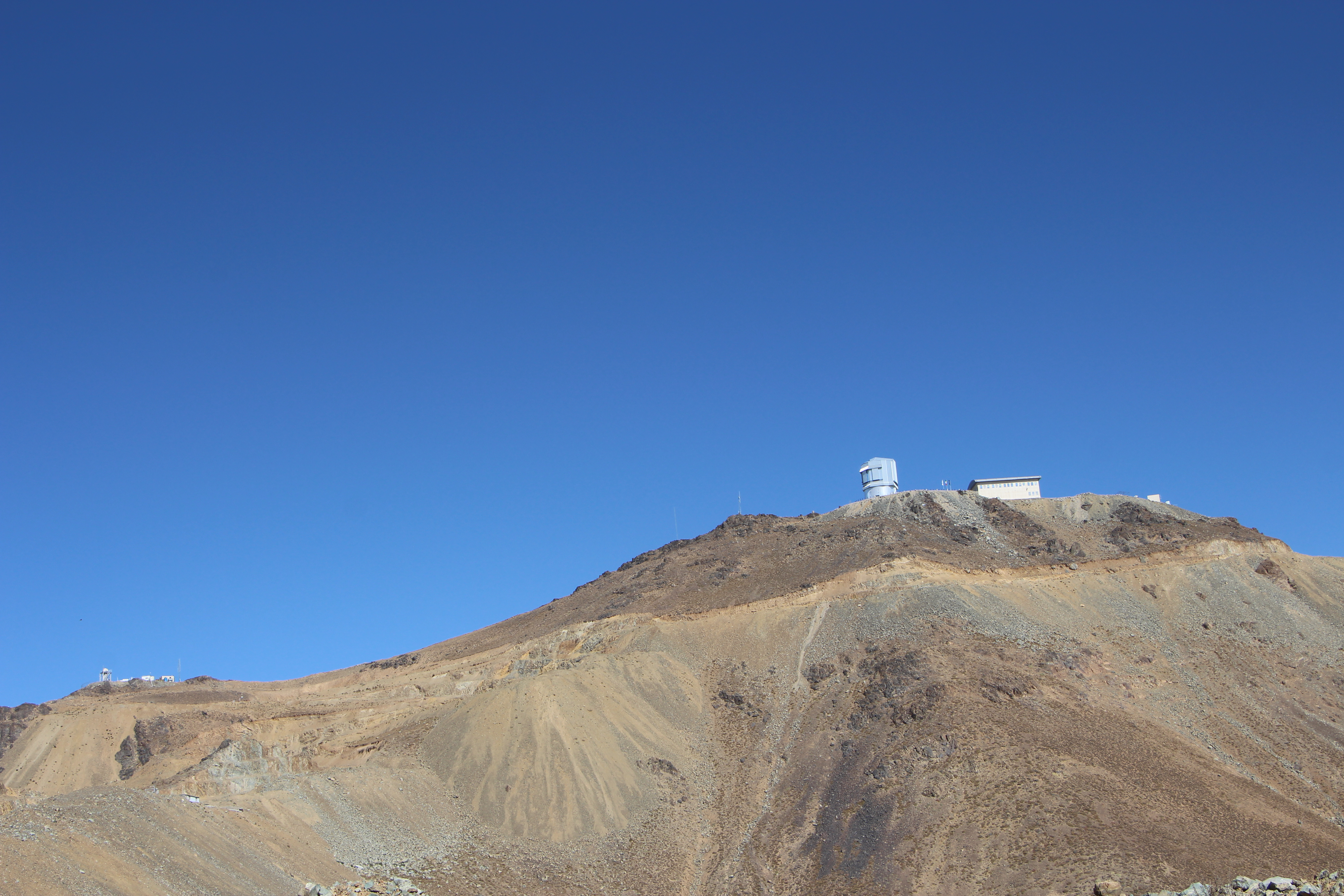
A view of Iranian National Observatory facilities

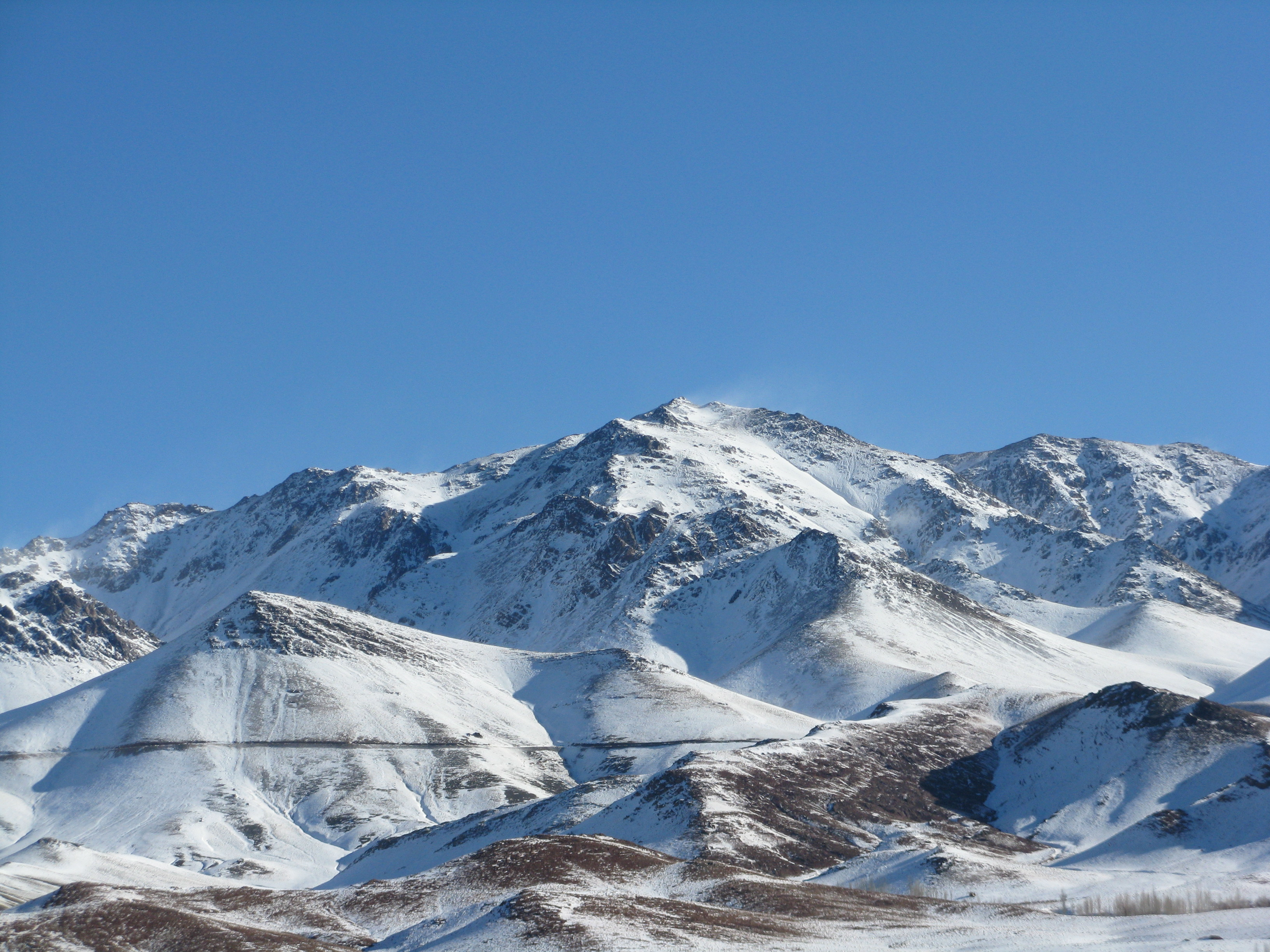
The Gargash summit will host INO 3.4-m optical telescope, wide-angle survey station and site monitoring facilities

Iranian National Observatory (INO) is an Iranian astronomical observatory inaugurated in 2021. It has reported the capture of its first light on 15 October 2022 upon the commissioning of INO340, a home-grown optical telescope with a primary mirror of 3.4 m, making it by far the country's largest astronomical research facility.

== Background ==
The project aimed at the construction of observing facilities for astronomical research and education purpose. The primary goal is the design and construction of a 4 m-class optical telescope and other smaller observing facilities to respond to a growing demand. INO is executed at the Institute for Research in Fundamental Sciences (IPM), one of the leading research institutes in fundamental sciences in Iran.

The training capabilities in observational astronomy in Iran in late 2000s was unable to meet the growing demand due to a rapid growth in higher education. While almost every big university in Iran has an astronomy department or group, the existing observational facilities consist of a number of small telescopes in various university campus observatories generally used for undergraduate and graduate training.

A medium-size optical telescope is thought to be a step to facilitate research in astronomy and observational cosmology. The geographic location of Iran, relatively dry climate, and high-altitude mountains offer suitable locations for optical telescopes to carry out surveys and time-critical observations.

At the present, the flagship of the INO observing facilities, a 3.4-m optical telescope known as INO340, is in commissioning state. Iranian scientists see the project as a platform to catch up with the science and technological developments in the field of astronomy and cosmology.

== Site selection ==
The site selection activities began in 2000 before the formal approval of the project in 2004. Over 30 sites were visited, and seeing observations were conducted at some of them. Later, four sites were chosen for simultaneous seeing monitoring for two years. With two sites in hand after the conclusion of the site selection (2000–2007), INO made seeing measurements to be able to compare the two sites, Dinava (~3000 m) and Gargash (~3610 m). In 2011, INO announced Mount Gargash as the site for this project. The site became road accessible in 2016.

== Telescope design ==
=== Optics ===
The telescope is a Ritchey–Chrétien f/11 which provides an unvignetted 20-arcmin field of view at the main Cassegrain focus. In addition, three broken side foci are also provided, each with a field of view of 8 arcmin. The main mirror (M1) is a single-segment fast f/1.5 mirror with a diameter of 3.4 m, which makes INO340 one of the most compact telescopes for its size. M1 is a meniscus shape 18 cm thick made of a Zerodur ceramic with a 700-mm central hole. The M1 is polished to 1-nm roughness. It is supported by 60 actuators which are actively controlled to hold the mirror at the correct shape. The 600-mm secondary mirror reflects the light from the primary mirror and is also controlled by a hexapod. The mirror is made of a Zerodur ceramic and has a hyperbolic surface geometry.

=== The structure ===
The telescope mount is altitude over azimuth (alt-az) which allows the telescope to be compact and provides direct load paths from the telescope down through the structure to the pier and foundations. The drive motors used to move the telescope in azimuth and elevation will be servo motors with position feedback provided by linear tape encoders.

=== Telescope Control System (TCS) ===
The TCS is responsible for controlling a number of subsystems such as the mount control system (MCS), which is responsible for pointing and tracking the targets, and the mirrors control system or active control systems (ACS). MCS receives commands from the user interface.

=== Telescope enclosure and the dome ===
The telescope enclosure is a cylindrical structure composed of a concrete ring 16 m in diameter, at the centre of which a 6-m diameter telescope pier is located. On top of the concrete building there is a rotating cylindrical structure of approximately 200 tons, with a 5-m shutter to facilitate the exposure of the primary mirror to the light from the dark night objects and five windows to allow air flow inside the dome. The dome and a lower floor are chilled during the day to improve the mirror seeing.

== Observational facilities ==
INO site monitoring

The INO site monitoring facility became operational in November 2014. The facility is located about 500 m to the south of the main Gargash peak where the 3.4-m Telescope is located. The facility consists of three elements: First, an automatic DIMM seeing monitor placed at a height of 6 m above the surface of the mountain, remotely operated from Tehran; Secondly, a standard weather station at 9 m above the ground; And finally, an all-sky camera. The control system is designed in-house.

Live site data is available here.

INO Lens Array

The INO Lens Array (INOLA) is a multi-lens array constructed by the INO Technology Development Division (TDD) team to study ultralow-surface-brightness systems at visible wavelengths. The array is particularly designed to reveal faint structures by greatly reducing scattered light and internal reflections within its optics. Some of the scientific goals envisioned for the INOLA include observing faint galaxies, stellar halos and substructures, tidal debris around galaxies, comets and minor bodies in the Solar System, light echos, intra-cluster light, variable stars and exoplanetary transits. INOLA became operational in 2018 and is now open for proposals.

To obtain more information about the facility visit here.

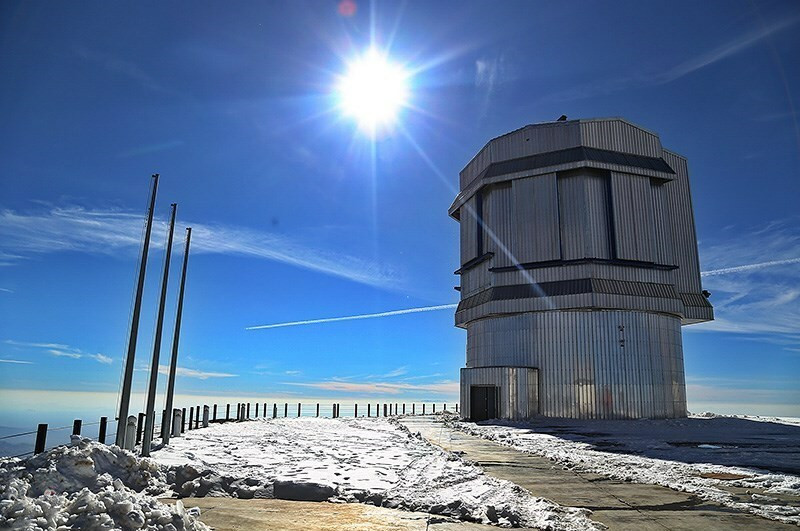
Main 3.4-meter Telescope Building

== Science with INO ==
A vast number of scientific issues in observational astronomy and cosmology can be addressed using a medium-class telescope such as the INO 3.4-m telescope. At the same time, as it is designed for a wavelength interval limited to between 325 and 2500 nm, INO340 is an excellent tool for collaborative programs joining other major similar-size and/or larger telescopes as well as space-based telescopes optimized to work at similar or different, even very different, wavelength ranges.

The study of galaxies and the formation and evolution of the large- and small-scale structures are, to a large extent, based on the observations carried out by mid-size telescopes. Large and very large telescopes can help scientists make out fainter and smaller objects; however, 2- to 4-m class telescopes are still pursued for economic reasons and greater flexibility. These telescopes can complement other observing facilities to address some of the most fundamental questions related to galaxies, such as the evolution of the cosmic web of galaxies, metal production and distribution within and between galaxies, the formation of the present-day Hubble sequence and also understanding our own galaxy.

For the community of astronomers in Iran, extragalactic astronomy and observational cosmology are new undertakings mostly because of the absence of suitable observing facilities in the past, and thus INO340 will focus on this line of developing research. Taking advantage of the location, INO340 is designed to respond to time-critical astronomical events. Large programs and surveys are also pursued in instrumentation planning.

In 2024, using the Iranian National Observatory Lens Array (INOLA), the first ever attempt at exploring the stellar halo of M33 Galaxy using ultra-deep broad-band imaging was conducted and reported.

== See also ==
- Institute for Research in Fundamental Sciences
- List of astronomical observatories
