= Institute for Research in Fundamental Sciences =

Public research institute in Iran

- پژوهشگاه دانش‌های بنیادی
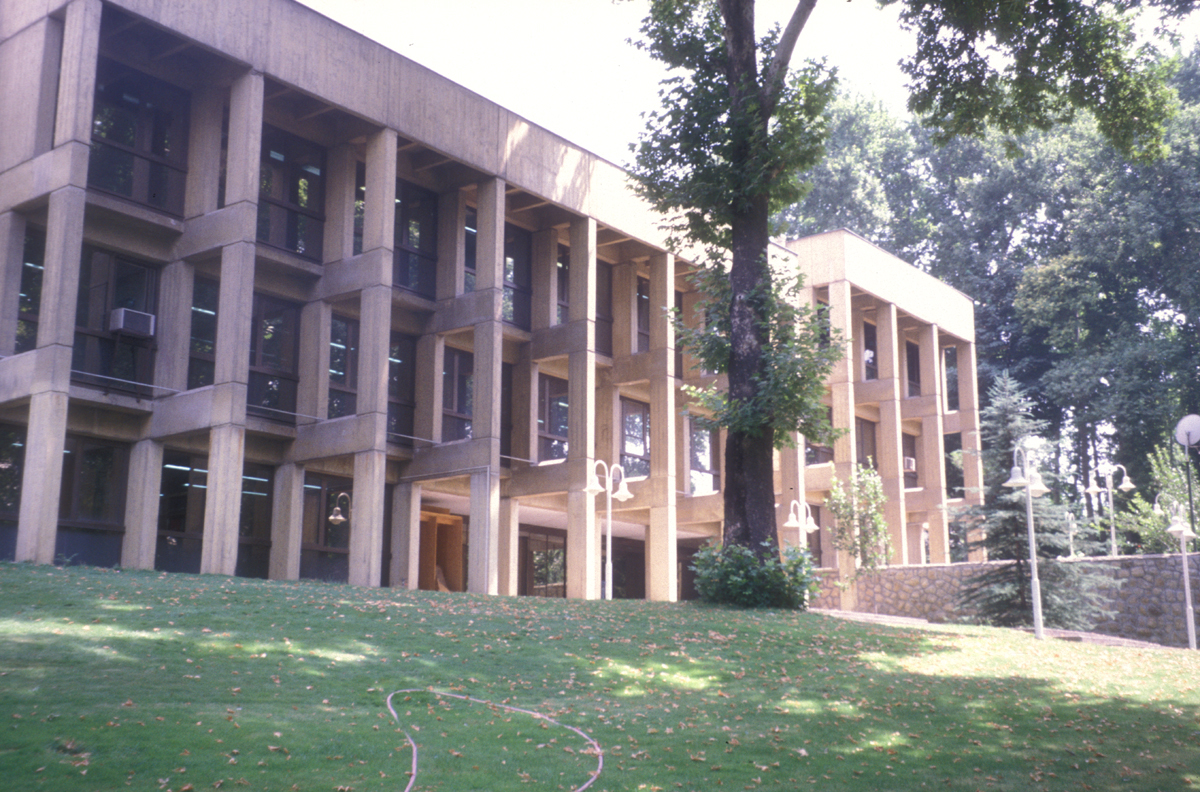
- Type: Public
- Established: 1989
- President: Mohammad-Javad Larijani
- Location: Tehran, Tehran, Iran; 35.810°N 51.470°E
- Campus: Urban
- Website: www.ipm.ac.ir

The Institute for Research in Fundamental Sciences (IPM; Persian: پژوهشگاه دانش‌های بنیادی, romanized: Pazhuheshgah-e Danesh-ha-ye Boniadi), previously Institute for Studies in Theoretical Physics and Mathematics, is a public research institute in Tehran, Iran. IPM is directed by Mohammad-Javad Larijani, its original founder. The institute was the first Iranian organization to connect to the Internet and provide internet service to the nation. It is the domain name registry of .ir domain names.

The institute's activities are directed along several routes:

- The institute conducts research along the lines that led to its inception, both independently and in cooperation with other research institutes inside the country and abroad.
- The institute carries out conferences as well as joint research projects, and exchanges researchers to establish links with other research institutes and scientific communities within and outside Iran.
- The institute provides facilities as well as financial support and opportunity for sabbaticals for researchers belonging to other institutes and universities.
- The institute tries to provide the atmosphere necessary for attracting Iranian researchers and scientists from around the world.
- The institute conducts graduate study programs to train researchers in areas where the institute is interested to increase the number of manpower.
- The institute publicizes its scientific findings of IPM through books, journals, and scientific gatherings.
- The institute provides scientific and cultural services that fit within the framework of its activities.
- The institute seeks to recognize the basic needs of the country in fundamental sciences.
- The institute has established a national scientific network over the intranet in order to connect all scientific and research centers and to develop the corresponding technologies in Iran.

The pillars of the institute are its board of governors, the director of the institute, and the institute's scientific council. The institute has four campuses, all north of Tehran in the Farmanieh district, immediately south of Niavaran. It offers advanced PhD degrees in areas such as mathematical logic, astronomy, particle physics and analytical philosophy, among others. At present the institute comprises nine schools:

- School of Astronomy
- School of Biological Sciences
- School of Cognitive Sciences
- School of Computer Science
- School of Mathematics
- School of Nano Science
- School of Particles and Accelerators
- School of Philosophy
- School of Physics

IPM hosts key science projects namely Iranian National Observatory and the Iranian Light Source Facility

== Notable faculty ==
- Farhad Ardalan, Physics
- Mehdi Golshani, Physics
- Bahram Mashhoon, Physics
- Reza Mansouri, Physics
- Hashem Rafii Tabar, Physics
- Hamid Vahid-Dastjerdi, Philosophy

== See also ==
- Higher education in Iran
- IPM School of Cognitive Sciences
- Science and technology in Iran
