= Iranian Science and Culture Hall of Fame =

Ever-lasting Names (چهره‌های ماندگار)
- Awarded for: Iranian Science and Culture Hall of Fame
- Country: Iran
- Presented by: Islamic Republic of Iran Broadcasting (IRIB)
- First award: 2001

Iranian Science and Culture Hall of Fame or Ever-lasting Names / People (Persian: چهره‌های ماندگار; read as čehre-hā-ye māndegār) is a formal ceremony to honor influential contemporary scientific and cultural Eminents. The title is awarded to those who "will remain always alive with its impact on the life of the people of the country". The ceremony is hosted by the IRIB.

== Presenters ==
The main presenter is IRIB TV4 with collaboration of:

- Academy of Persian Language and Literature
- Iranian Academy of sciences
- Iranian Academy of Medical Sciences
- Iranian Academy of the Arts
- University of Tehran
- Sharif University of Technology
- Iranian Research Institute of Philosophy

== Some of the notable members ==
Majid Samii (1937–, neurosurgery)

Ali Shariatmadari (1924–, educationist)

Sayed Jafar Shahidi (1918–2008, historian of Persian literature)

Caro Lucas (1951–2010, academician, father of Iranian robotics)

Mahmoud Farshchian (1930–, master of Persian miniature)

Ali Nassirian (1934–, actor)

Mohammad Nouri (1929–2010, singer)

Gholamreza Aavani (1943–, philosopher)

Hashem Rafii-Tabar (1948–, nanotechnologist)

Ali reza Eftekhari (1958-, Vocalist)

== Non-Iranians members ==
Roger Garaudy (1913–2012, French author and philosopher)

Annemarie Schimmel (1922–2003, German Iranologist)

== See also ==
- Science in Iran
- Culture of Iran
