= Todd Hedrick =

American philosopher (born 1978)

- Born: 1978 (age 47–48)

Education
- Education: Northwestern University (PhD), Swarthmore College (BA)
- Thesis: Reconstituting political philosophy: Rawls and Habermas in dialogue (2006)
- Doctoral advisor: Thomas A. McCarthy

Philosophical work
- Era: 21st-century philosophy
- Region: Western philosophy
- School: Hegelian philosophy
- Institutions: Michigan State University
- Website: philosophy.msu.edu/faculty-staff/todd-hedrick/

Todd Hedrick (born 1978) is an American philosopher and Professor of Philosophy at Michigan State University. He is known for his works on Hegel's philosophy and critical theory.

== Books ==
- Hedrick, Todd (1 January 2010). Rawls and Habermas. Stanford University Press. doi:10.1515/9780804774758. ISBN 978-0-8047-7475-8.
- Hedrick, Todd (2019). Reconciliation and Reification: Freedom's Semblance and Actuality from Hegel to Contemporary Critical Theory. New York, NY, United States of America. ISBN 978-0-19-063403-2. OCLC 1048017024.
