= Tony Smith (philosopher) =

American philosopher (born 1951)

- Born: 1951 (age 74–75)
- Awards: National Science Foundation Grant

Academic background
- Education: Boston College (BA); Stony Brook University (PhD)

Academic work
- Discipline: Philosophy
- Institutions: Iowa State University
- Main interests: Georg Wilhelm Friedrich Hegel; Karl Marx

Tony Smith (born 1951) is an American philosopher and Emeritus Professor of Philosophy at Iowa State University. He is known for his works on capitalism, Hegel, and Marx.

== Books ==
- Beyond Liberal Egalitarianism: Marx and Normative Social Theory in the Twenty-First Century, Leiden, The Netherlands: Brill, 2017
- Globalisation: A Systematic Marxian Account, Brill Press, 2005. [paperback: Haymarket Books, 2009.]
- Technology and Capital in the Age of Lean Production: A Marxian Critique of the “New Economy”, State University of New York Press, 2000.
- Dialectical Social Theory and Its Critics: From Hegel to Analytical Marxism and Postmodernism, State University of New York Press, 1993.
- The Role of Ethics in Social Theory: Essays from a Habermasian Perspective, State University of New York Press, 1991.
- The Logic of Marx’s Capital: Replies to Hegelian Criticisms, State University of New York Press, 1990.
- Hegel’s Logic and Marx’s Capital: A Reexamination (co-edited with Fred Moseley), Brill, 2014.
- Dialectics for a New Century (co-edited with Bertell Ollman), Palgrave/Macmillan, 2007.
