= Brian O'Connor (philosopher) =

Irish social philosopher and professor

Brian O'Connor MRIA
- Born: 1965 (age 60–61)

Education
- Education: University College Dublin

Philosophical work
- Institutions: University College Dublin

Brian Patrick Dixon O'Connor (born 1965) is an Irish social philosopher active in the tradition of continental European intellectual thought. O'Connor is a professor of philosophy at University College Dublin and director of the school of philosophy. He has written extensively on German Idealism and Critical Theory, and is an expert on the philosopher, Adorno. O’Connor has also written on the subject of idleness in his 2018 book of the same name, which provided a comparative analysis of the philosophy of idleness. He was awarded a higher doctorate by the National University of Ireland in 2021. In May 2021, he was made a member of the Royal Irish Academy.

== Books ==
- O'Connor, Brian; Allen, Amy, eds. (2019). Transitional Subjects: Critical Theory and Object Relations. Columbia University Press. ISBN 9780231544788.
- Idleness: A Philosophical Essay. Princeton University Press. 2018. ISBN 9780691167527.
- Adorno. Routledge. 2013. ISBN 9780415367363.
- O'Connor, Brian; Mohr, Georg, eds. (2006). German Idealism: An Anthology and Guide. Edinburgh University Press. ISBN 0748615555.
- Adorno's Negative Dialectic: Philosophy and the Possibility of Critical Rationality. MIT Press. 2004. ISBN 9780262151108.
- The Adorno Reader. Wiley. 2000. ISBN 9780631210771.
