= Mehdi Golshani =

Iranian physicist (1939–2026)

- مهدی گلشنی
- Born: 21 January 1939; Isfahan, Iran
- Died: 21 November 2026 (aged 87)
- Education: University of California, Berkeley; University of Tehran

Mehdi Golshani (Persian: مهدی گلشنی; 21 January 1939 – 21 November 2026) was an Iranian theoretical physicist, and a distinguished professor at Sharif University of Technology. He was a member of the Iranian Science and Culture Hall of Fame, a senior fellow of the Academy of Sciences of Iran and a founding fellow of the Institute for Studies in Theoretical Physics and Mathematics. He was a member of the Supreme Council of the Cultural Revolution.

== History ==
He received his B.Sc. in physics from Tehran University in 1959 and his PhD in physics with a specialization in particle physics in 1969 from the University of California, Berkeley. The title of his doctoral dissertation is "Electron impact excitation of heavily ionized atoms".

== Life ==
=== Career ===
Mehdi Golshani was a distinguished lecturer. His main research areas include foundational physics, particle physics, physical cosmology and philosophical implications of quantum mechanics. He is known as a thinker for his writings on science, religion and their interrelation.

Golshani was the founder and chairman of the Faculty of Philosophy of Science at Sharif University of Technology. He was also the director of the Institute of Humanities and Cultural Studies, Tehran, Iran, and a professor at Physics Department of Sharif University of Technology, as well as a Senior Fellow of School of Physics at Institute for Studies in Theoretical Physics and Mathematics (IPM).

He was among the Former Judges of The Templeton Prize. Golshani was a fellow of Islamic World Academy of Sciences IAS.

He wrote numerous books and articles on physics, philosophy of physics, science and religion, as well as science and theology. In most of Golshani's works, there is a clear attempt to help revive the scientific spirit in the Muslim world.

Golshani died on 21 November 2026, at the age of 87.

== Works ==
=== Books ===
- تحليلى بر ديدگاههاى فلسفى فيزيكدانان معاصر (a Probe into the Philosophical Viewpoints of Contemporary Physicists). in Persian.
- علم دینی و علم سکولار (Secular and religious science). in Persian.
- Golshani, Mehdi. Holy Quran and the Sciences of Nature. Paperback ed. Studies in Contemporary Philosophical Th., 1997.
- From Physics to Metaphysics, Institute for Humanities and Cultural Studies, Tehran, 1998
- Golshani, Mehdi. Can Science Dispense with Religion? Hardcover ed. I.H.C.S., 1998.
- English Translation of the Holy Qur'an, Vol. 1, Islamic Propagation Organization, Tehran, 1991
