= Nidhal Guessoum =

Algerian astrophysicist

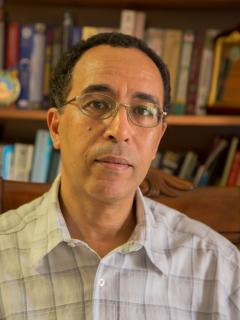
- Born: September 6, 1960 (age 65)
- Education: University of California, San Diego
- Scientific career
- Fields: Astrophysics
- Workplaces: American University of Sharjah
- Thesis: Thermonuclear reactions of light nuclei in astrophysical plasmas (1988)

YouTube information
- Channel: Nidhal Guessoum نضال قسوم
- Years active: 2015–present
- Subscribers: 568 thousand
- Views: 36 million
- Last updated: April 2, 2026

Nidhal Guessoum (Arabic: نضال قسوم, romanised: Niḍāl Qassūm; born September 6, 1960) is an Algerian astrophysicist. He is a professor at the American University of Sharjah, United Arab Emirates.

His research interests range from gamma-ray astrophysics, such as positron-electron annihilation, nuclear gamma-ray lines, and gamma-ray bursts, to Islamic astronomy, i.e. crescent visibility, Islamic calendar, and prayer times at high latitudes, problems that have yet to be fully resolved. He has published a number of technical works and lectured internationally at many renowned universities (Cambridge, Oxford, Cornell, Wisconsin, and others).

In addition to his academic work, he writes about issues related to science, education, the Arab world, and Islam. Guessoum is also a columnist for Gulf News and The Huffington Post, and has made notable contributions to Nature Middle East. He has also appeared many times on international media outlets, including Al-Jazeera, BBC, NPR, France 24, Le Monde, and others.

== Education and academia ==
Guessoum attended Lycée Amara Rachid School in Algiers and went on to earn a B.Sc. in Theoretical Physics from the University of Science and Technology of Algiers in 1982. He then went to the United States for graduate studies. He earned M.Sc. and Ph.D. degrees from the University of California, San Diego. His 1988 doctoral thesis, "Thermonuclear reactions of light nuclei in astrophysical plasmas", featured a recalculation of the rate of the fundamental reactions underlying the rate of energy production in the core of the Sun (in addition to neutrinos) as well as the rates of breakup reactions of light nuclei (protons and alphas particles on C, N, O, etc.) in various astrophysical environments, especially in accretion disks around compact objects such as black holes and neutron stars, where this is accompanied by gamma-ray p line emission.

After his Ph.D., he spent two years as a post-doctoral researcher at NASA's Goddard Space Flight Center under the supervision of Reuven Ramaty, now famous for the astrophysical satellite RRHESSI named after him. He has also had made many visits to and maintained collaborations with several institutions, particularly in France.

From 1990-1995, Guessoum worked at the University of Blida, Algeria. In 1995, he moved to the College of Technological Studies, Kuwait, where he stayed until 2000. Since that year, he has been based at the American University of Sharjah, UAE. He holds memberships with the International Astronomical Union (IAU), the International Society for Science and Religion (ISSR), and the Islamic Crescents Observation Project (ICOP).

For several years he was a regular collaborator for INTEGRAL (International Gamma-Ray Astrophysics Laboratory) at the Center for Space Radiation Studies in Toulouse, France. He has produced several well-regarded papers on the problem of positron-electron annihilation in the milky-way galaxy, a still-open problem in high-energy astrophysics. His more recent work concerns gamma-ray burst phenomena.

== Books and advocacy ==
In 2010, Guessoum authored Islam's Quantum Question: Reconciling Muslim Tradition and Modern Science. In the book, he argued that modern science must be integrated into the Islamic worldview, including the theory of biological and human evolution, which he maintains does not contradict Islamic tenets and ethos. He insisted that the Muslim world should take "scientific questions—quantum questions—with utmost seriousness if it is to recover its true heritage and integrity."

As a critic of Harun Yahya, he has maintained that rejection of established scientific fact is "counter-productive and does not bode well for Muslims, whether with regard to science or modernity, more generally."

He has also worked hard to spread modern scientific knowledge in Arab-Muslim society. In particular, he co-authored a book on the crescent-based Islamic calendar (in two editions), insisting on taking modern astronomical knowledge and methodology fully on board when addressing the problem. He further coauthored four Arabic editions of The Story of the Universe – from primitive conceptions to the Big Bang.

In 2013 Guessoum wrote a commentary in Nature showing the stark contrast between the state of astronomy in the Arab world during the golden age of Islamic civilization and criticizing Arab nations for not investing more money in astronomy research, which he suspects "is being neglected because of the strongly utilitarian Arab Muslim approach to science."
