= Zanjani =

Zanjani is a surname. Notable people with the surname include:

- Abbas-Ali Amid Zanjani (1937–2001), Iranian politician
- Asadollah Bayat-Zanjani (born 1941), Iranian theologian
- Babak Zanjani (born 1974), Iranian business magnate
- Abdulkarim Zanjani (1887–1968), Muslim scholar
- Esmail Zanjani, American researcher
- Mirza Abutaleb Zanjani (1843–1911), Iranian jurist
- Mohammad Ezodin Hosseini Zanjani (1921–2013), Iranian Twelver Shi'a Marja'
- Seyyed Mohammad Hosseini Zanjani (born 1947), Iranian Twelver Shi'a Marja'
- Mousa Shubairi Zanjani (1928–2026), Iranian Twelver Shi'a Marja'
- Nina Zanjani (born 1981), Swedish actress
- Reza Zanjani (1902–1984), Iranian cleric
