= Dipak =

Dipak is a given name. Notable people with the name include:

- Dipak Prakash Baskota, Nepalese politician
- Dipak Chudasama (born 1963), former Kenyan cricketer
- Dipak K. Das (1947–2013), the director of the Cardiovascular Research Center at the University of Connecticut Health Center in Farmington
- Dipak Desai, majority owner of Endoscopy Center of Southern Nevada, a private same day surgery facility localed in Las Vegas, Nevada
- Dipak C. Jain, the Director (Dean) of Sasin Graduate Institute of Business Administration of Chulalongkorn University in Bangkok, Thailand
- Dipak Kalra (born 1959 in London), President of the European Institute for Health Records and of the European Institute for Innovation through Health Data
- Dipak Karki (Jhapa politician), Nepalese politician, belonging to the Communist Party of Nepal (UML)
- Dipak Karki (Dhanusha politician), Nepalese politician, belonging to the People's Socialist Party, Nepal
- Dipak Misra (born 1953), judge of the Supreme Court of India
- Dipak Nandy, Indian Marxist and academic who was the founder and first Director of the Runnymede Trust
- Dipak Patel (cricketer, born 1958) (born 1958), played 37 Tests and 75 One Day Internationals for the New Zealand cricket team
- Dipak Dipankar, Bangladeshi poet, journalist and researcher
- Dipak Patel (cricketer, born 1961) (born 1961), former Kenyan cricketer
- Dipak Rai, Nepali footballer
- Dipak Sarma, flautist from the Assam state of India
- Dipak Tijori (born 1961), Indian film director and actor who works in Bollywood films

== See also ==
- Deepak, also a given name
- DIPA (disambiguation)
- Ipak (disambiguation)
