= Khanom Mosque =

Shi'ite mosque in Zanjan, Zanjan province, Iran

- مسجد جامع ابرکوه
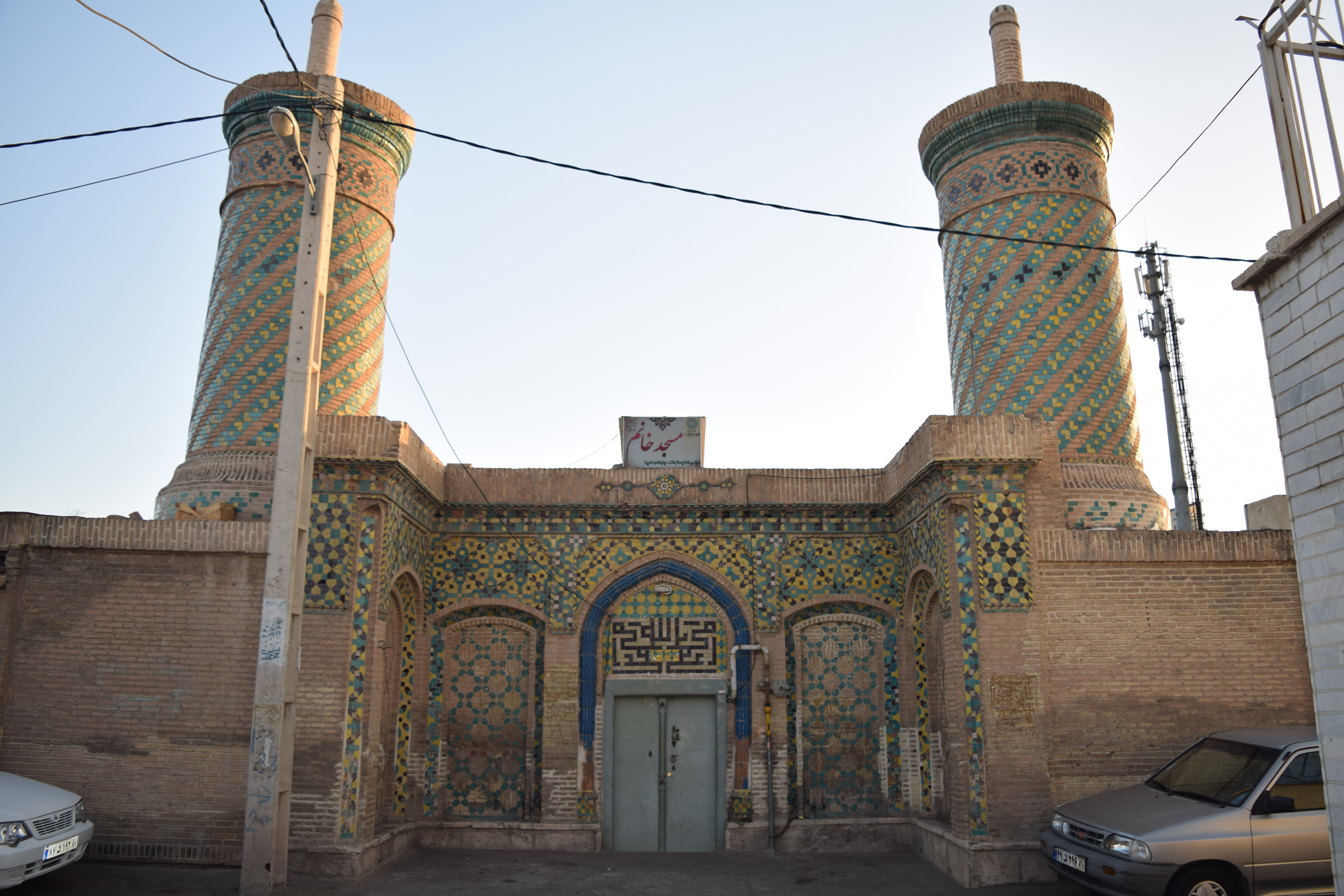
- The mosque entrance in 2016

- Location of the mosque in Iran

Religion
- Affiliation: Shia Islam
- Ecclesiastical or organizational status: mosque
- Status: Active

Location
- Location: Zanjan, Zanjan Province
- Country: Iran
- Interactive map of Khanom Mosque
- Coordinates: 36°40′8.5″N 48°28′41″E

Architecture
- Type: Mosque architecture
- Style: Qajar
- Completed: 1904 CE

Specifications
- Dome: One (maybe more)
- Minaret: Two
- Materials: Bricks; mortar

Iran National Heritage List
- Official name: Khanom Mosque
- Type: Built
- Designated: 30 April 1975
- Reference no.: 1055
- Conservation organization: Cultural Heritage, Handicrafts and Tourism Organization of Iran

The Khanom Mosque (Persian: مسجد خانم; Arabic: مسجد خانم) (Note: Also spelled as the Khanum Mosque and the Khanoom Mosque.) is a Shi'ite mosque located on Imam Street, in the city of Zanjan, in the province of Zanjan, Iran. Completed in 1904 CE, during the Qajar era, the mosque was built by Ismail and commissioned by Jamileh Khanom, daughter of Hossein Gholi Khan Afshar (Zolfagharieh), one of the wealthy ladies in the late Qajar period.

The mosque was added to the Iran National Heritage List on 30 April 1975, administered by the Cultural Heritage, Handicrafts and Tourism Organization of Iran.

== Gallery ==
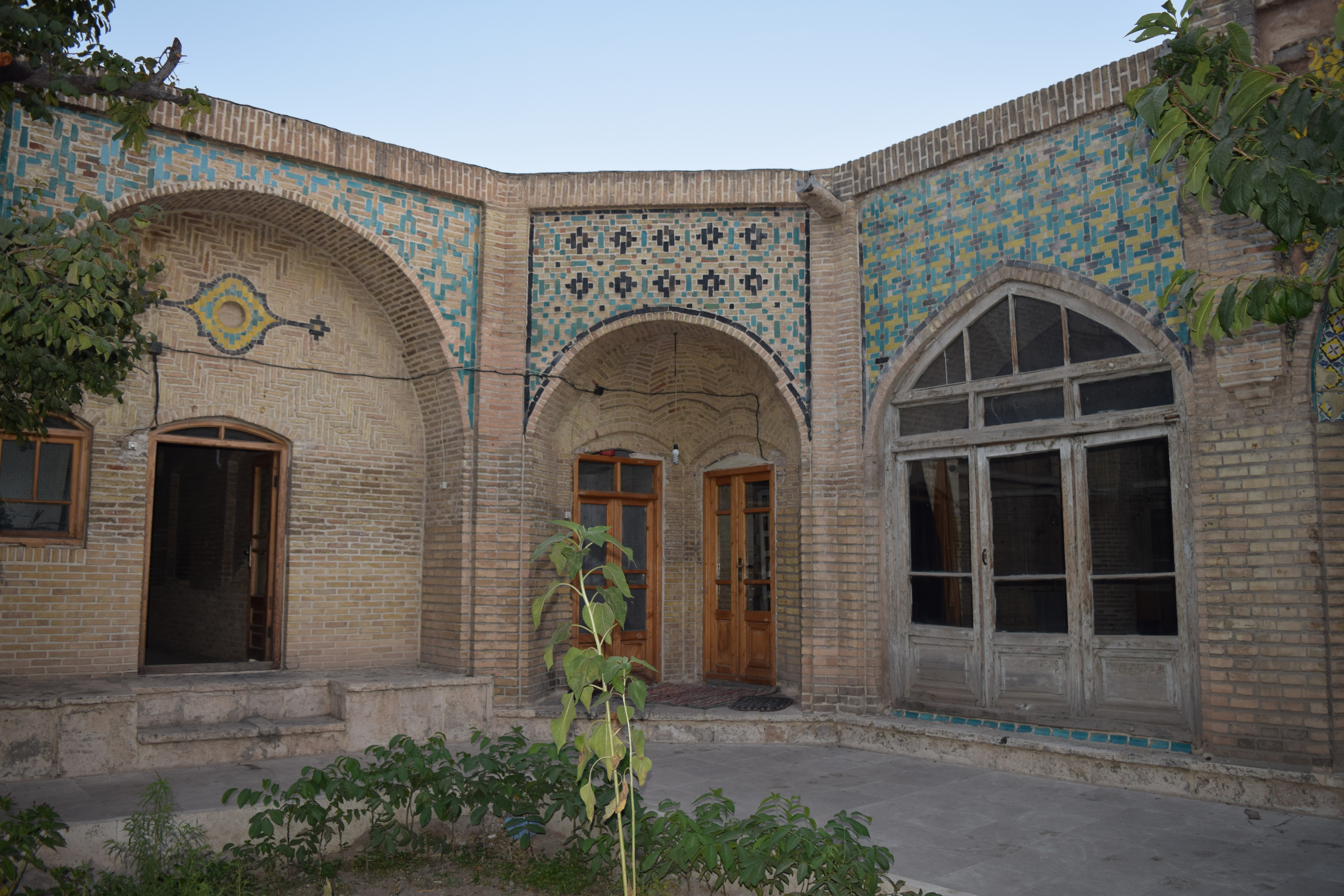

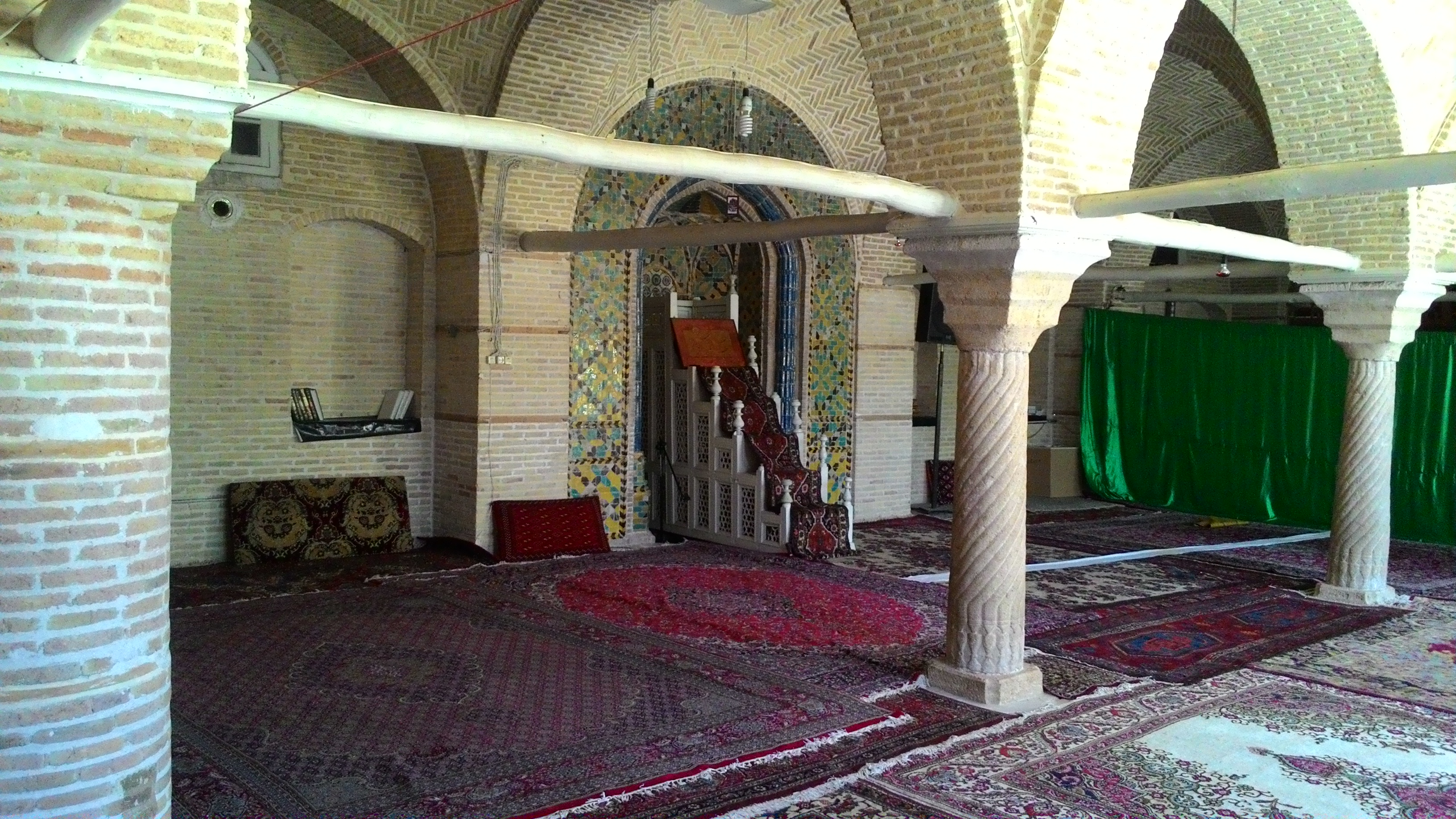

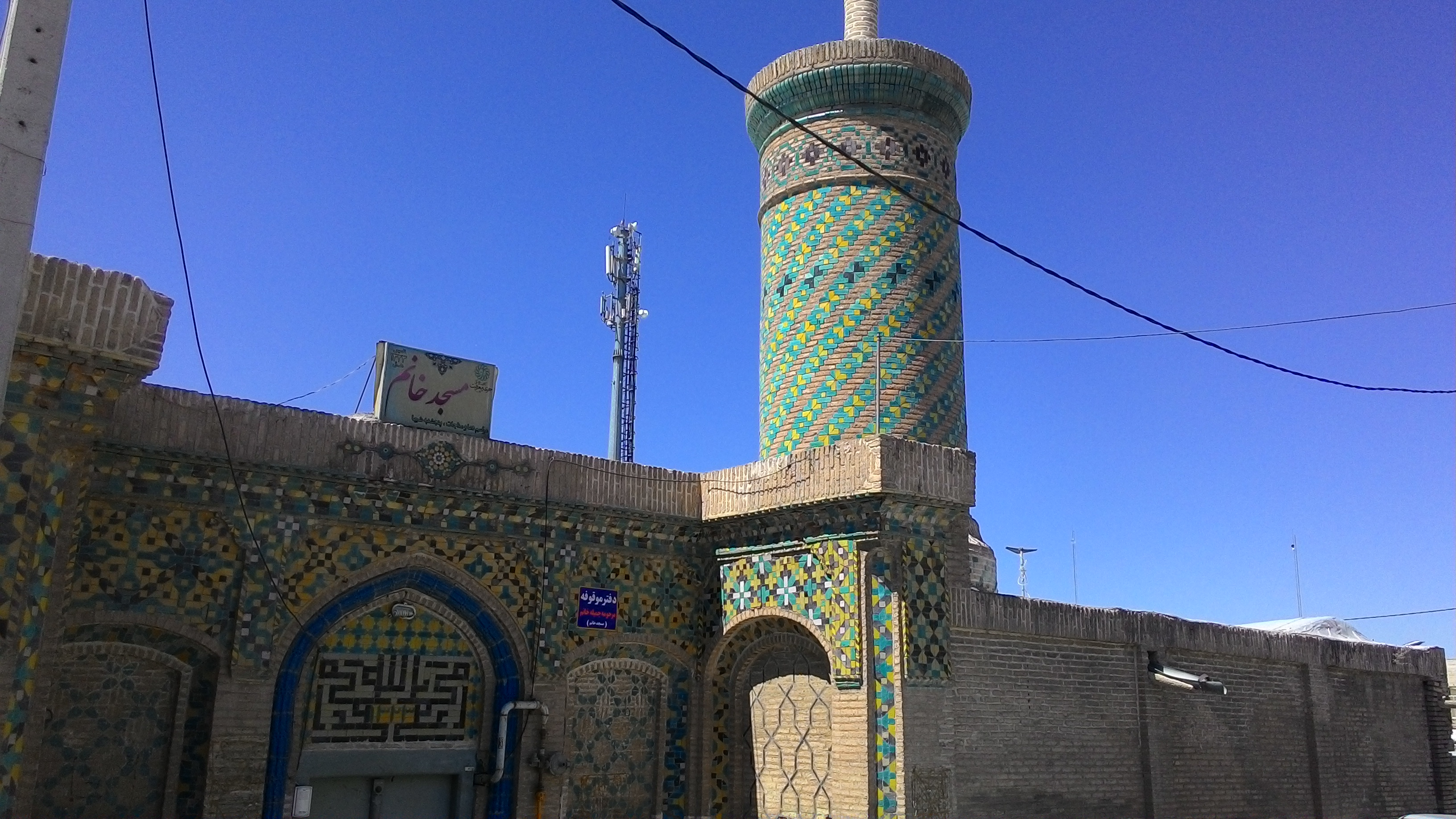

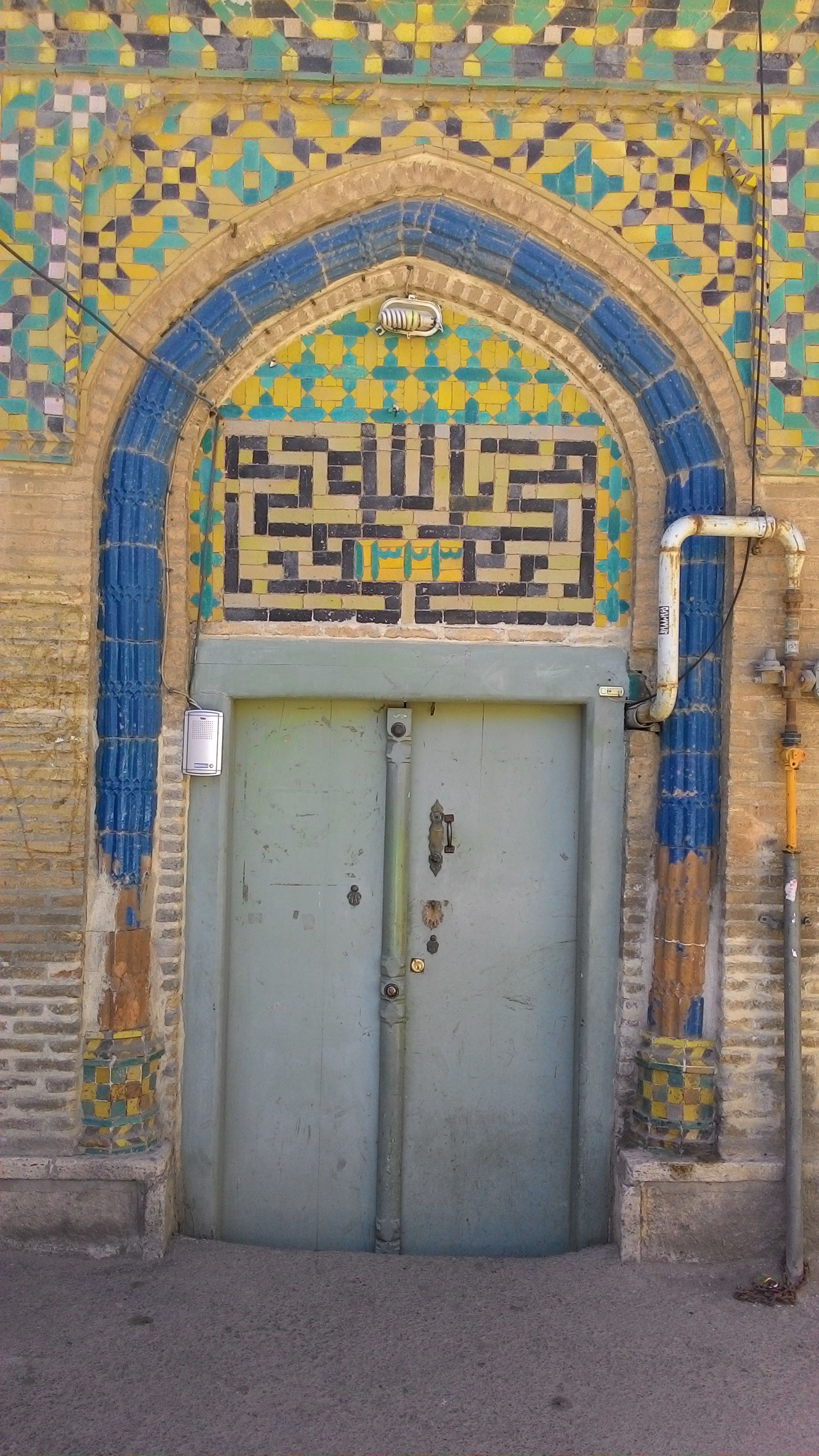

== See also ==
- Shia Islam in Iran
- List of mosques in Iran
