= Qaplan Tu =

Qaplan Tu قپلانتو
- Village
- Location within Iran
- Coordinates: 36°14′25″N 46°43′30″E
- Country: Iran
- Province: Kurdistan
- County: Saqqez
- Bakhsh: Ziviyeh
- Rural District: Gol Tappeh

Population (2006)
  - Total: 711
- Time zone: UTC+3:30 (IRST)
  - Summer (DST): UTC+4:30 (IRDT)

Qaplan Tu (Persian: قپلانتو, also Romanized as Qaplān Tū and Qaplāntū) is a village in Gol Tappeh Rural District, Ziviyeh District, Saqqez County, Kurdistan Province, Iran. At the 2006 census, its population was 711, in 166 families. The village is populated by Kurds.

== Name ==
The name "Qaplan Tu" is Mongolian in origin and means "having panthers". The name of the Qaflankuh mountains has the same etymology, although its current form is slightly distorted from the original.
