= Zanjan, Iran =

City in Zanjan province, Iran

Zanjan Persian: زنجان
- City
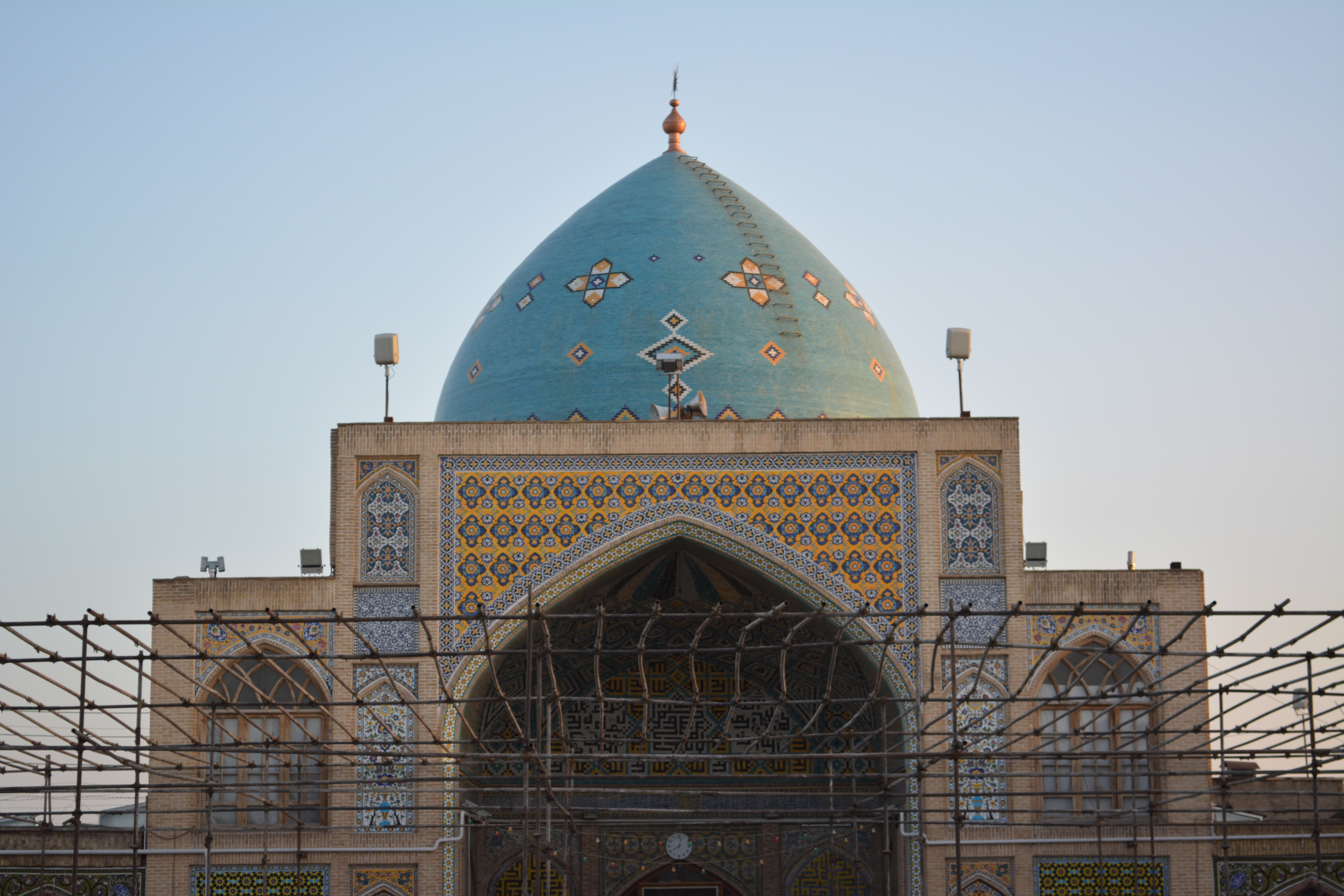
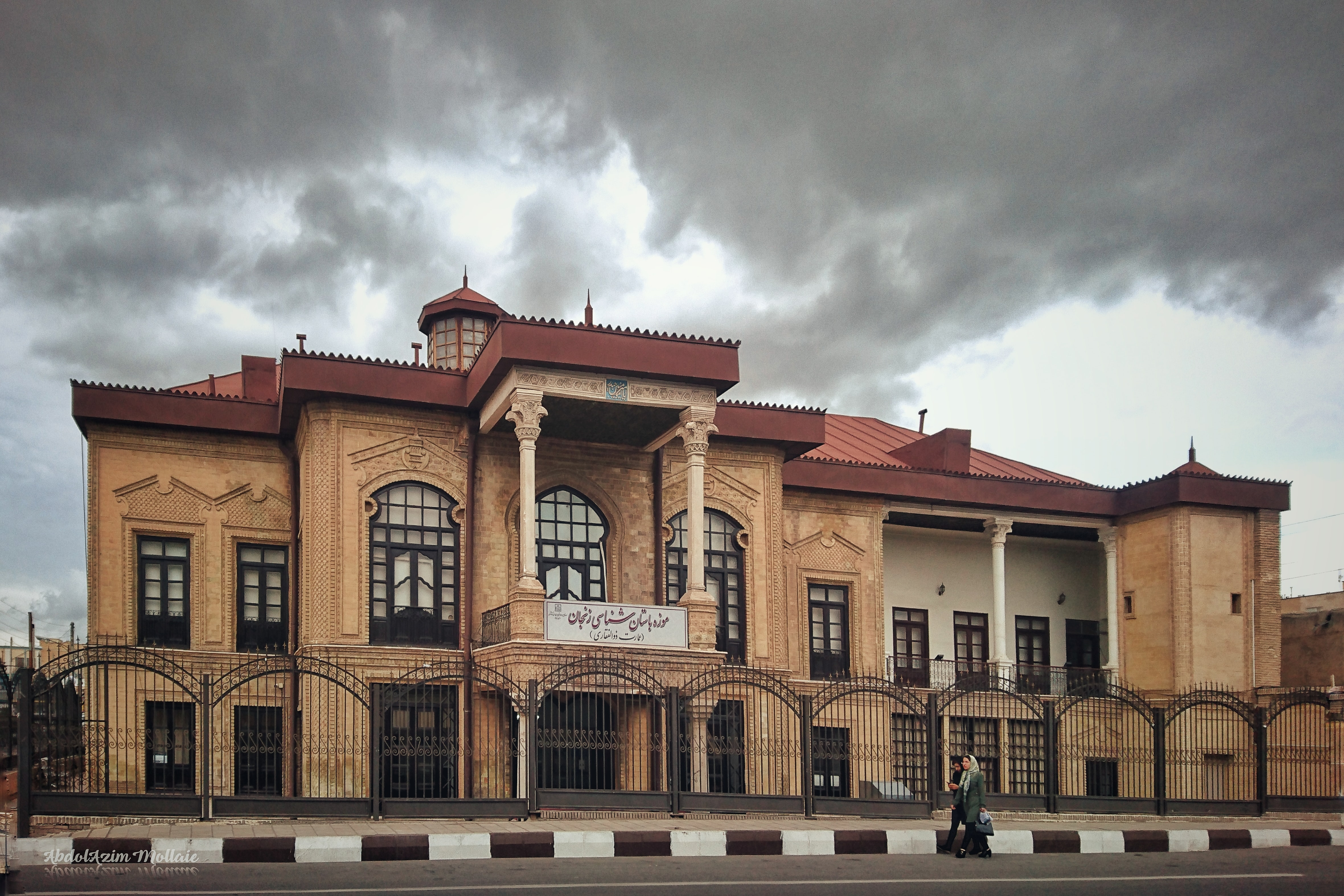
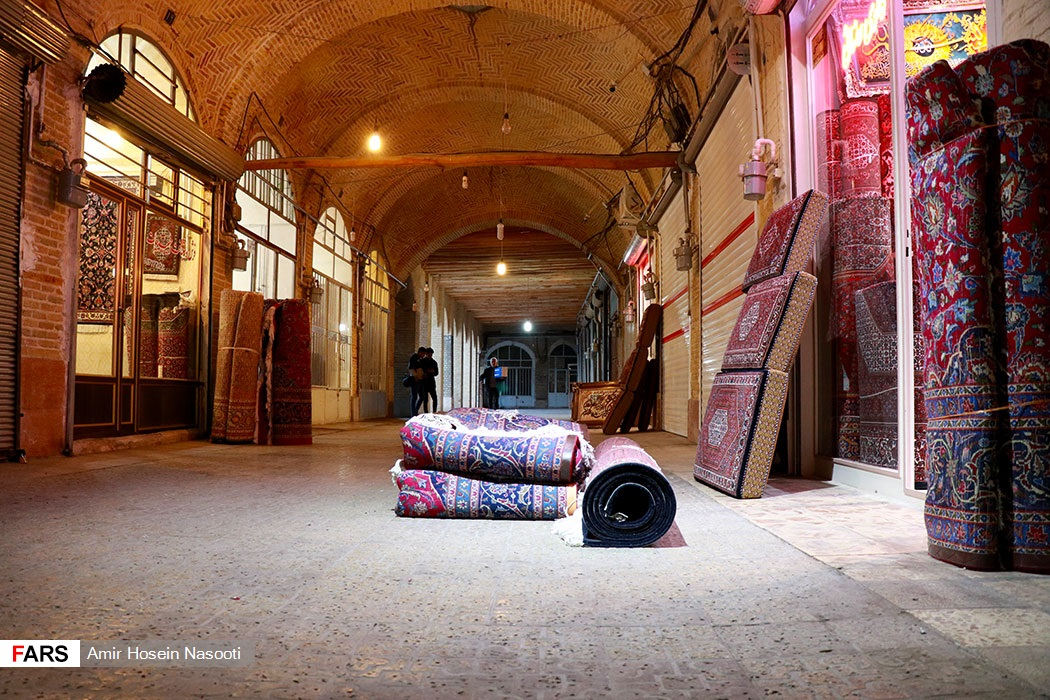
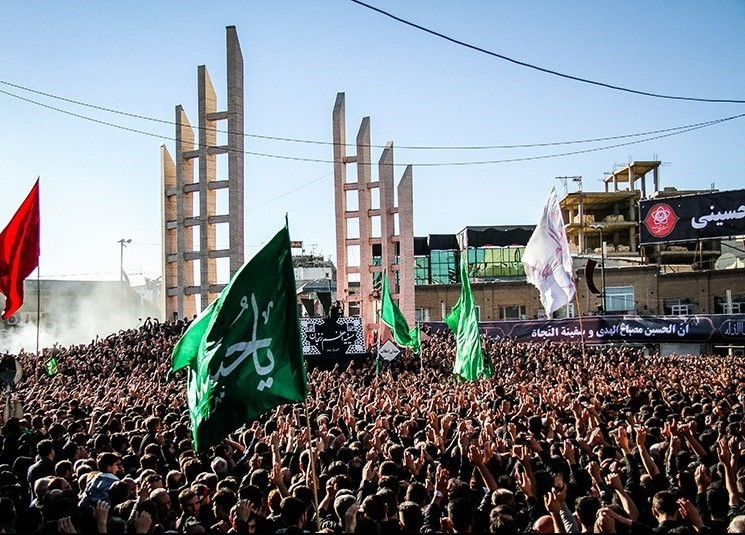
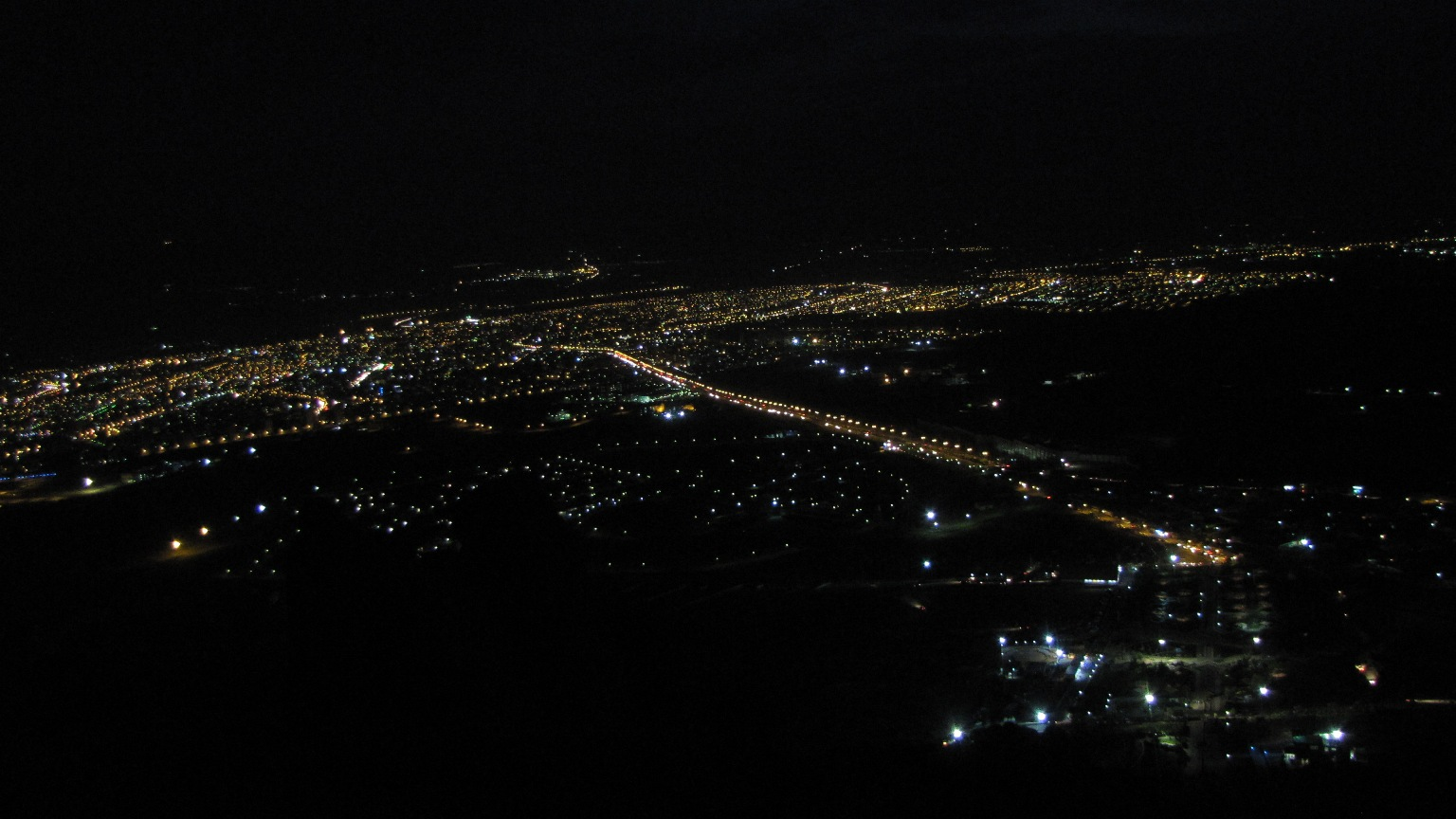
- Clockwise rotation: Zolfaghari House, Hosseinieh Azam Zanjan Mosque's clique, Night photo of the city, Zanjan bazaar, Jameh Mosque of Zanjan.

- Seal

- Location within Iran
- Coordinates: 36°40′50″N 48°29′56″E
- Country: Iran
- Region: 3
- Province: Zanjan
- County: Zanjan
- District: Central

Government
  - Mayor: Alireza Firouzfar
  - Parliament: Waqfchi and Ahmadi
- Elevation: 1,638 m (5,374 ft)

Population (2024)
  - Total: 698,255
  - Rank: 20th in Iran
- Time zone: UTC+3:30 (IRST)
- Website: www.Zanjan.ir

Zanjan (Persian: زنجان; pronounced [zænˈdʒɒːn]) (Note: Azerbaijani: زنجان) is a city in the Central District of Zanjan County, Zanjan province, Iran, serving as capital of the province, the county, and the district.Zanjan's population boasts the highest level of happiness among the people of 30 other provinces in Iran, according to a detailed survey conducted by Isna.

== History ==
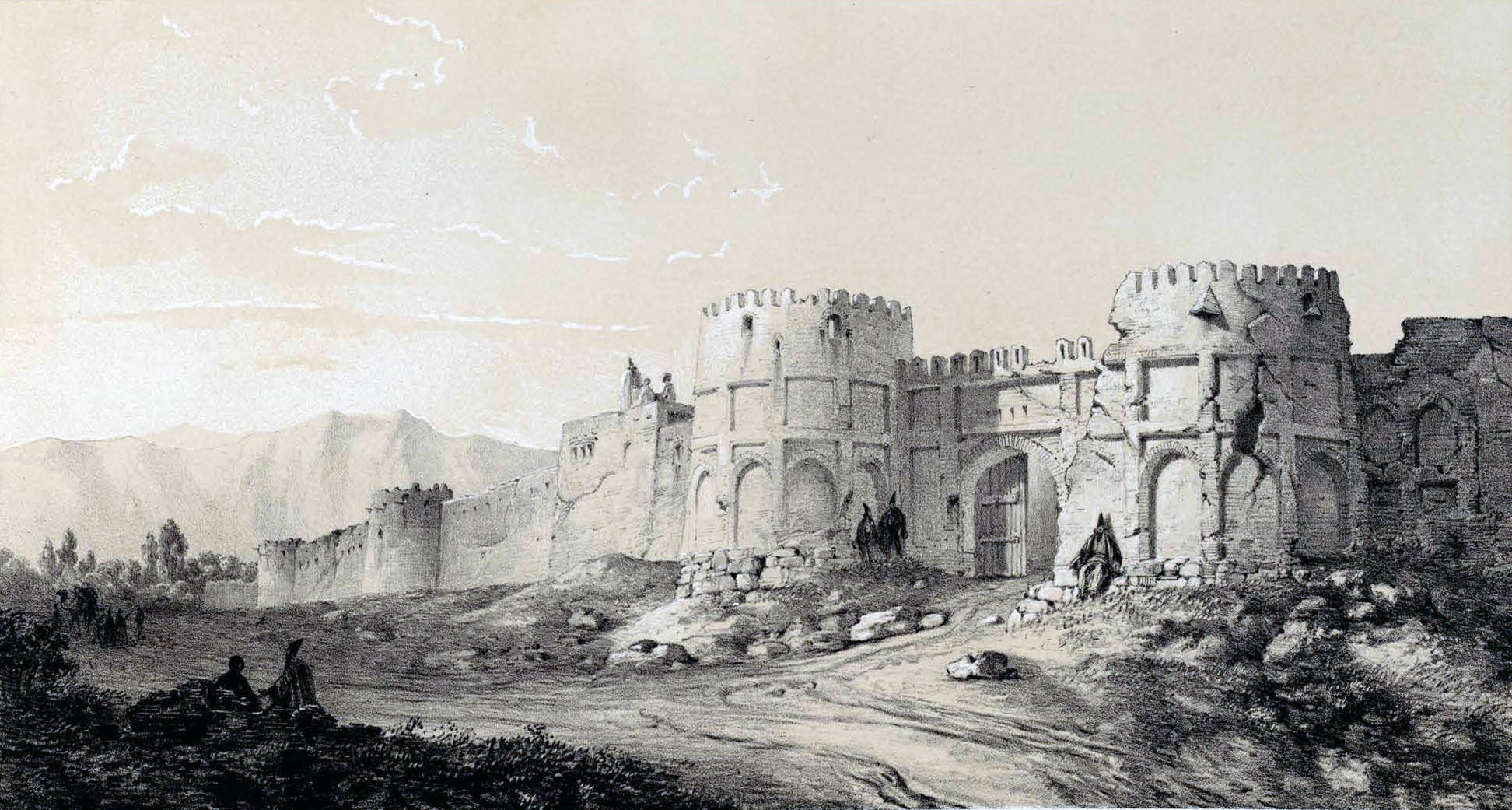
Drawing by Eugène Flandin

According to the Nuzhat al-Qulub of the 14th-century Iranian geographer Hamdallah Mustawfi (died after 1339/40), Zanjan was said to have been founded by the first Sasanian ruler Ardashir I (r. 224–242), who named it "Shahin." During the Arab invasion of Iran, Zanjan was conquered in 645 by a force led by al-Barra ibn Azib. Medieval geographers generally agree that Zanjan was located in the region of Jibal/Persian Iraq, near the frontier of the neighbouring region of Azerbaijan. Some geographers also include Zanjan as part of Daylam or Ray.

After 833, the Abbasid Caliphate had a chain of forts constructed from Zanjan to Ardabil to counter the 817–837 rebellion of the Khurramite leader Babak Khorramdin (died 838). In the 10th-century, Zanjan was ruled by local Daylamite dynasties such as the Musafirids (919–1062). According to the 13th-century Arab geographer Yaqut al-Hamawi (died 1229), the Persians referred the city as "Zangan." During the Ilkhanate era (1256–1335), the inhabitants were reported by Hamdallah Mustawfi to have spoken "pure Pahlavi" (pahlavī-e rāst), a Median or northern form of Persian.

One important moment in the history of the city was in 1851 when the city became a center for the suppressed Babi religious movement, along with Neyriz and a fortress known as Shaykh Tabarsi. The forces of the central government captured the Babi fort in Zanjan after a long siege on the orders of Grand Vizier (Prime Minister of Iran) Amir Kabir and killed or expelled the Bab's followers.

Before becoming the capital of the namesake Zanjan province, Zanjan was a county of the Gilan province.

== Demographics ==
=== Language and ethnicity ===
The population of Zanjan consists mostly of Iranian Azeris who are bilingual in Azerbaijani and Persian.

Approximately half of the population of Zanjan province lives in Zanjan city. In a 2017 study, researchers concluded that Azerbaijani-speaking families in the city display language shift to Persian.

=== Population ===
At the time of the 2006 National Census, the city's population was 341,801 in 89,829 households. The following census in 2011 counted 386,851 people in 110,943 households. The 2016 census measured the population of the city as 430,871 people in 132,469 households, making it the 20th largest city in Iran.

The city lies 298 km (185 mi) northwest of Tehran on the main highway to Tabriz and Turkey, and approximately 125 km (78 mi) from the Caspian Sea. It is about 20 km (12 mi) south of the Qaflankuh Mountain Range.

== Geography ==
According to the Food and Agriculture Organization (FAO) of the United Nations, rainfed agriculture makes up around 42% of Zanjan's land cover and grasslands account for another 37%. The remainder is bareland, irrigated agriculture, forest, orchard and riverbanks. Only 1.07% of the land is urban development.

=== Climate ===
Zanjan has a cool semi-arid climate (Köppen BSk) with hot, dry summers and cold, moist winters, often with snowfall. Precipitation is very low, and mostly falls between October and May. On February 13, 2020, a temperature of −21.0 °C or −5.8 °F was recorded.

Climate data for Zanjan (1991–2020, records 1955–2020)
| Month | Jan | Feb | Mar | Apr | May | Jun | Jul | Aug | Sep | Oct | Nov | Dec | Year |
|---|---|---|---|---|---|---|---|---|---|---|---|---|---|
| Record high °C (°F) | 18.1 (64.6) | 22.0 (71.6) | 27.2 (81.0) | 32.0 (89.6) | 33.3 (91.9) | 40.0 (104.0) | 40.5 (104.9) | 43.0 (109.4) | 37.0 (98.6) | 30.0 (86.0) | 24.0 (75.2) | 22.5 (72.5) | 43.0 (109.4) |
| Mean daily maximum °C (°F) | 5.5 (41.9) | 7.6 (45.7) | 13.0 (55.4) | 18.7 (65.7) | 23.9 (75.0) | 29.8 (85.6) | 32.8 (91.0) | 32.9 (91.2) | 28.9 (84.0) | 21.9 (71.4) | 13.3 (55.9) | 8.0 (46.4) | 19.7 (67.4) |
| Daily mean °C (°F) | −0.9 (30.4) | 1.3 (34.3) | 6.1 (43.0) | 11.5 (52.7) | 16.2 (61.2) | 21.5 (70.7) | 24.5 (76.1) | 24.2 (75.6) | 19.6 (67.3) | 13.4 (56.1) | 6.3 (43.3) | 1.5 (34.7) | 12.1 (53.8) |
| Mean daily minimum °C (°F) | −5.2 (22.6) | −3.3 (26.1) | −0.5 (31.1) | 4.8 (40.6) | 8.2 (46.8) | 11.6 (52.9) | 14.9 (58.8) | 14.4 (57.9) | 10.3 (50.5) | 6.2 (43.2) | 1.2 (34.2) | −2.8 (27.0) | 5.1 (41.2) |
| Record low °C (°F) | −30.0 (−22.0) | −28.6 (−19.5) | −19.6 (−3.3) | −11.0 (12.2) | −5.0 (23.0) | 1.6 (34.9) | 5.4 (41.7) | 4.5 (40.1) | 0.0 (32.0) | −6.0 (21.2) | −15.2 (4.6) | −24.8 (−12.6) | −30.0 (−22.0) |
| Average precipitation mm (inches) | 26.0 (1.02) | 29.0 (1.14) | 39.6 (1.56) | 51.3 (2.02) | 38.8 (1.53) | 9.7 (0.38) | 8.4 (0.33) | 4.4 (0.17) | 3.3 (0.13) | 20.2 (0.80) | 36.5 (1.44) | 28.5 (1.12) | 295.7 (11.64) |
| Average precipitation days (≥ 1.0 mm) | 5.0 | 5.5 | 6.4 | 8.0 | 6.7 | 2.3 | 1.8 | 1.0 | 0.7 | 3.8 | 5.3 | 5.2 | 51.7 |
| Average rainy days | 10.8 | 10.1 | 12.6 | 13.0 | 11.5 | 4.2 | 2.7 | 2.3 | 1.9 | 6.4 | 8.0 | 9.9 | 93.4 |
| Average snowy days | 9.6 | 8.0 | 5.6 | 1.0 | 0.0 | 0.0 | 0.0 | 0.0 | 0.0 | 0.0 | 1.9 | 6.7 | 32.8 |
| Average relative humidity (%) | 71 | 67 | 58 | 55 | 52 | 42 | 42 | 40 | 43 | 52 | 65 | 70 | 54.8 |
| Average dew point °C (°F) | −6.8 (19.8) | −5.6 (21.9) | −3.5 (25.7) | 0.7 (33.3) | 4.2 (39.6) | 5.9 (42.6) | 8.7 (47.7) | 7.7 (45.9) | 4.4 (39.9) | 1.7 (35.1) | −1.5 (29.3) | −4.7 (23.5) | 0.9 (33.7) |
| Mean monthly sunshine hours | 147 | 161 | 196 | 218 | 280 | 345 | 350 | 348 | 309 | 244 | 163 | 138 | 2,899 |
Source 1: NOAA NCEI
Source 2: (records, rain days, snow/sleet days 1955–2010)

== Main sights in the city of Zanjan ==
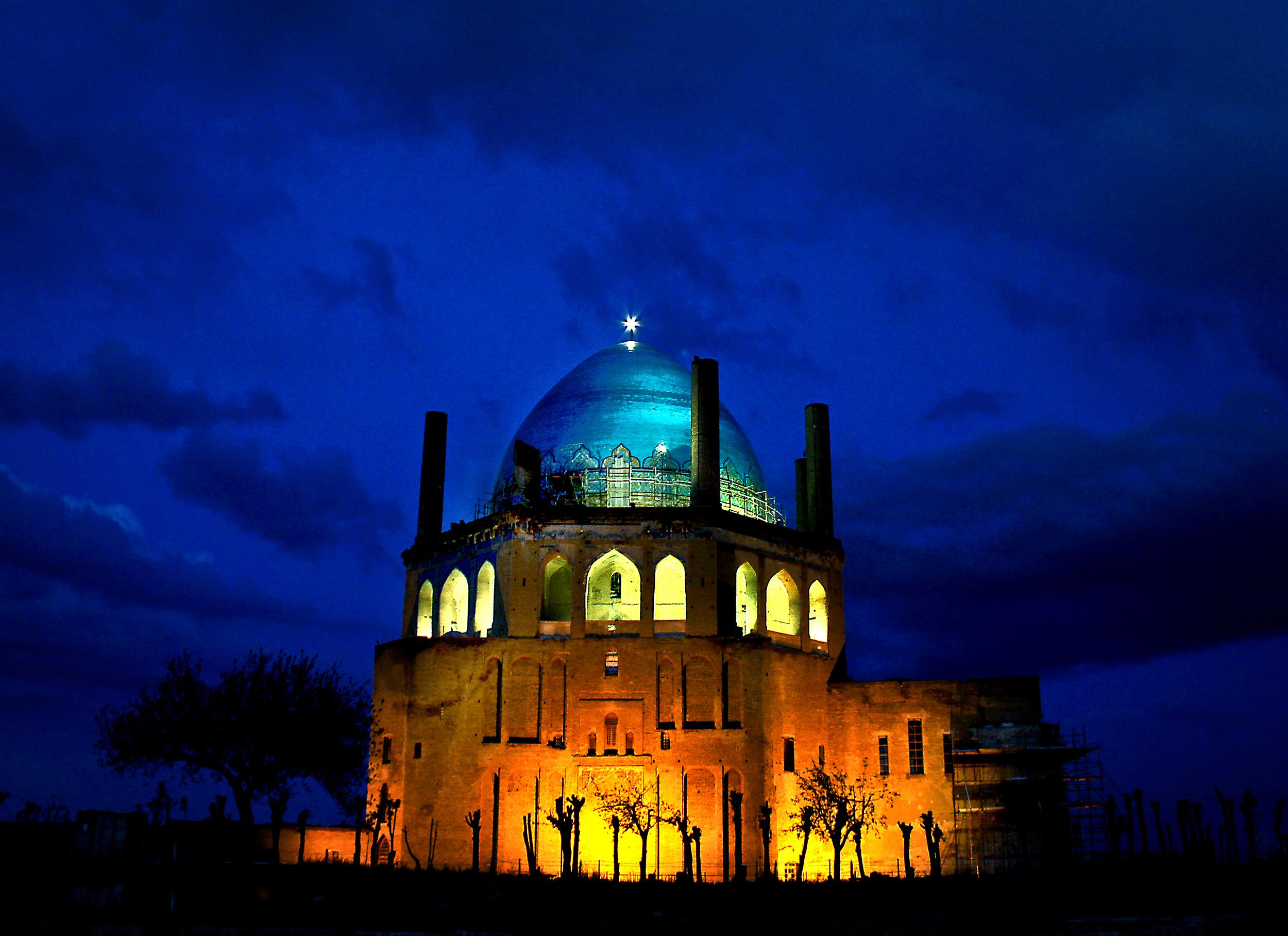
Soltaniyeh Dome

=== Zanjan bazaar ===
Zanjan's bazaar is a public marketplace that started in Agha Mohammadkhan Ghajar-era in 1784 CE, and completed in 1792 CE during the Fath-Ali Shah-era. Mosques and a bath were added later. This bazaar has 940 shops, which consist of two defined parts, namely Bazaar-e Bala (upper bazaar) and Bazaar-e Paieen (lower bazaar). Vendors are organized by their professions and commodities.

=== Jameh Mosque of Zanjan ===
The central mosque of Zanjan is Jameh Mosque of Zanjan, also known as the Seyyed Mosque (Masjid-e-Seyyed), this was constructed in 1826 during the Qajar-era, by one of Fath-Ali Shah's sons. This mosque was built in the old area of the city and it's the religious center of Zajan.

=== Saltmen museum at Zolfaghari House ===
It's built on Imam Street. This building holds six naturally preserved human remains called saltmen or "namaki", which had been discovered in 1993 in the Chehrabad salt mines. These remains are originally from Achaemenian-era.

=== Tofighi's building ===
Tofighi's building is related to last parts of Qajar-era and Pahlavi-era. It's built on Imam Street. It was a house of the greatest man of Zanjan that was mayor of city. This building has 2 floors and consists of a symmetrical form.

=== Match company ===
The Match company (3 stars match company) is related to Pahlavi-era and located on Safa street. It is the second company of city and constructed by Mahmud Shalchi, before the World War II. It has a brick chimney.

=== Dadamaan Hotel Zanjan ===
The old abbey was constructed 200 years ago in the area of Enghelab square which is the most central and oldest part of Zanjan. It initially served as a caravanserai and then for approx. 80 years it was the house of one of Zanjan's scholars, Sheikh Jalal Ashabi.

It had been uninhabited for 20 years after the passing of the Seikh from 1997. It began to be renovated in 2017 and now serves as a traditional hotel.

=== Sangi Caravanserai ===
The Sangi Caravanserai (stone caravanserai) is an ancient roadside inn, constructed in Safavi-era and was converted into a restaurant in the 1990s. It's a single story stone building that has four iwans (porches) and a ceiling that is arcuate.

=== Rakhtshooy Khaneh Edifice ===
The Rakhtshooy Khaneh Edifice is a historical wash-house and Iranian national heritage site, that is currently being used as Zanjan anthropological museum.

== Industries ==
- Lead
- Zinc
- Pasteurized milk
- Chemical productions
- Weaving
- Cotton
- Food productions
- Transformer
- Electrical productions

=== Handicrafts ===
The most famous handicrafts are knives, charuq (a local style of women's shoes, similar to clodhopper shoes), filigree and gilding. Gilding is the one important art for decoration the books and calligraphies. Other handicrafts include coppersmithing, rug weaving and carpet weaving (including Kilim and Jajim style).

== Colleges and universities ==
Zanjan is also home to several universities such as:

- University of Zanjan
- Zanjan University of Medical Sciences
- Islamic Azad University of Zanjan
- Institute for Advanced Studies in Basic Sciences (IASBS)

== Sports ==
Zanjan is known for having one of the best indoor sport climbing walls in the Middle East, located in Enghelab sports complex. The facility also includes standard speed climbing walls. The city's football team is Shahrdari Zanjan F.C., who play in the 2nd Division.

== Notable people ==
For a complete list see: Category:People from Zanjan, Iran

- Syed Miran Hussain Zanjani, 11th century Sayyid Sufi mystic, who travelled to and settled in Lahore to preach Islam
- Shahab al-Din Yahya ibn Habash Suhrawardi, Persian philosopher and founder of the Iranian school of Illuminationism, an important school in Islamic philosophy that drew upon Zoroastrian and Platonic ideas
- Asadollah Bayat-Zanjani, Iranian theologian, Islamic philosopher, writer and Grand marja of Islam
- Hujjat, early leader of the Bábí movement of 19th-century Persia
- Reza Mirkarimi, contemporary film writer, director, and producer
- Mousa Shubairi Zanjani, Iranian shia Marja
- Yousef Sobouti, contemporary Iranian theoretical physicist
- Mehdi Sohrabi, Iranian professional racing cyclist
- Amir Hatami, Iranian regular army (Artesh) officer with the rank of Brigadier general and the current minister of defense of Iran
- Abbas-Ali Amid Zanjani, Iranian politician and cleric
- Saeid Mahdioun, Iranian fighter pilot
- Majid Shahriari, nuclear scientist and engineer who worked with the Atomic Energy Organization of Iran
- Jamileh Sheykhi, Iranian actress
- Said Matinpour, Iranian activist, journalist and ex-political prisoner
- Mirza Abutaleb Zanjani, Iranian jurist and Shia scholar
- Mohammad Ezodin Hosseini Zanjani, Iranian shia Marja
- Farah Ossouli, Iranian painter
- Jamshid Ansari, Iranian reformist politician
- Abdulkarim Zanjani, Shiite teacher
- Mohammad Yeganeh, Iranian economist who was the Governor of the Central Bank of Iran from 1973 to 1975
- Seyyed Mohammad Hosseini Zanjani, Iranian shia Marja
- Reza Zanjani, Shia Iranian cleric
- Masoud Roghani Zanjani, Iranian academic, economist, scholar
- Fatemeh Rakeei, Iranian politician, linguist, poet
- Ali Shakouri-Rad, Iranian physician and reformist politician
- Mahsa Javar, Iranian competitive rower
- Mohsen Mohammadseifi, Iranian wushu athlete
- Abdul Karim Kho'ini Zanjani, Iranian scholar and cleric
- Ali Akbar Saremi, Iranian architect
- Mohammad Kiavash, Iranian politician
- Meisam Nassiri, Iranian freestyle wrestler
- Ebadollah S. Mahmoodian, retired professor of mathematics
- Hossein Monzavi, prominent Iranian poet
- Hossein Abedini, Iranian actor
- Ahmad Hakimipour, Iranian reformist politician
- Davoud Maleki, Iranian featherweight weightlifter
- Seyed Esmaeil Mousavi Zanjani, Iranian politician
- Sadollah Nasiri Gheydari, university professor
- Narges Mohammadi, human rights activist and Nobel laureate
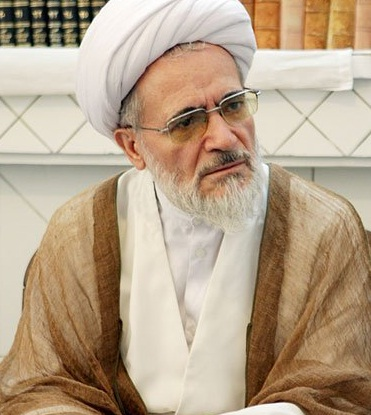
Asadollah Bayat-Zanjani

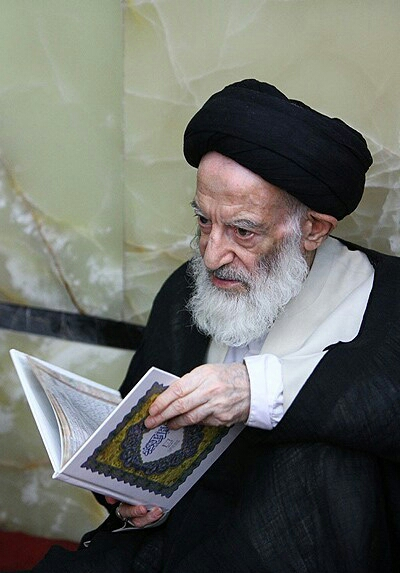
Mousa Shubairi Zanjani

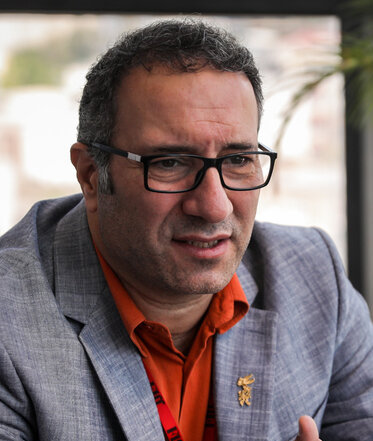
Reza Mirkarimi

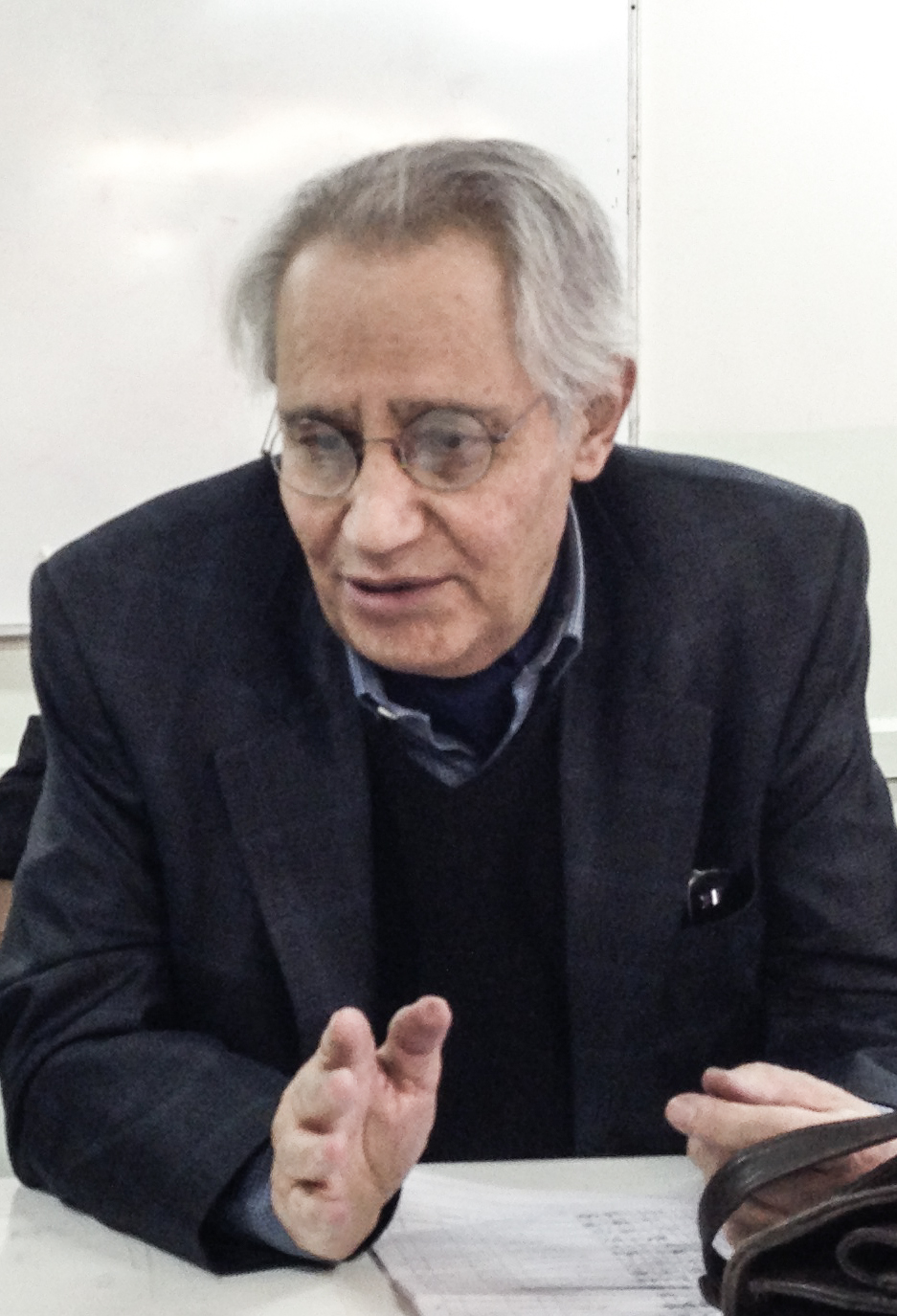
Ali Akbar Saremi

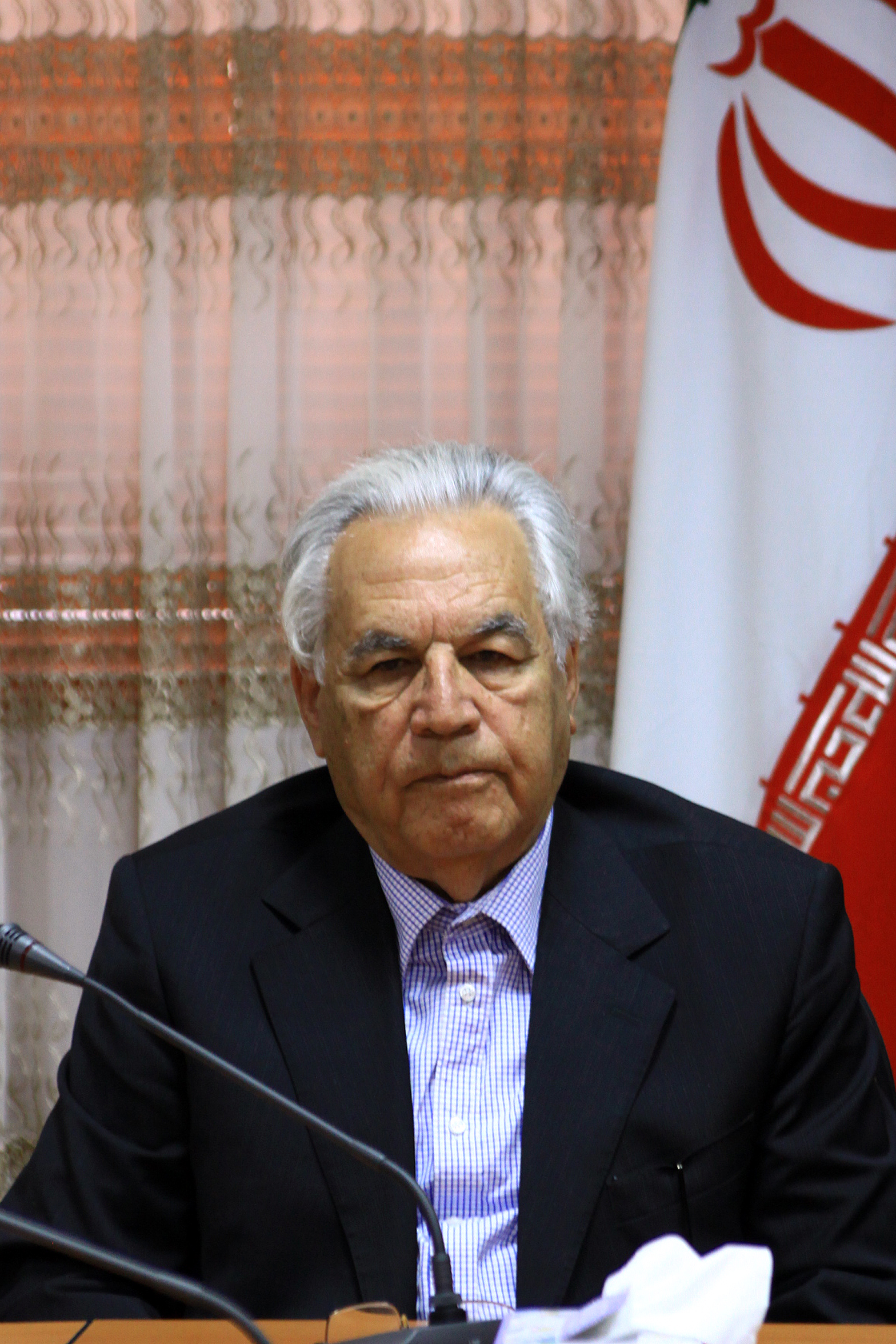
Yousef Sobouti

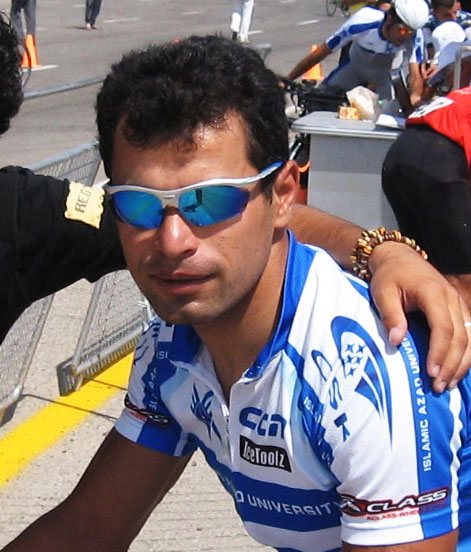
Mehdi Sohrabi

== Sister cities ==
- Trabzon, Turkey
- Malacca, Malaysia

== Gallery ==
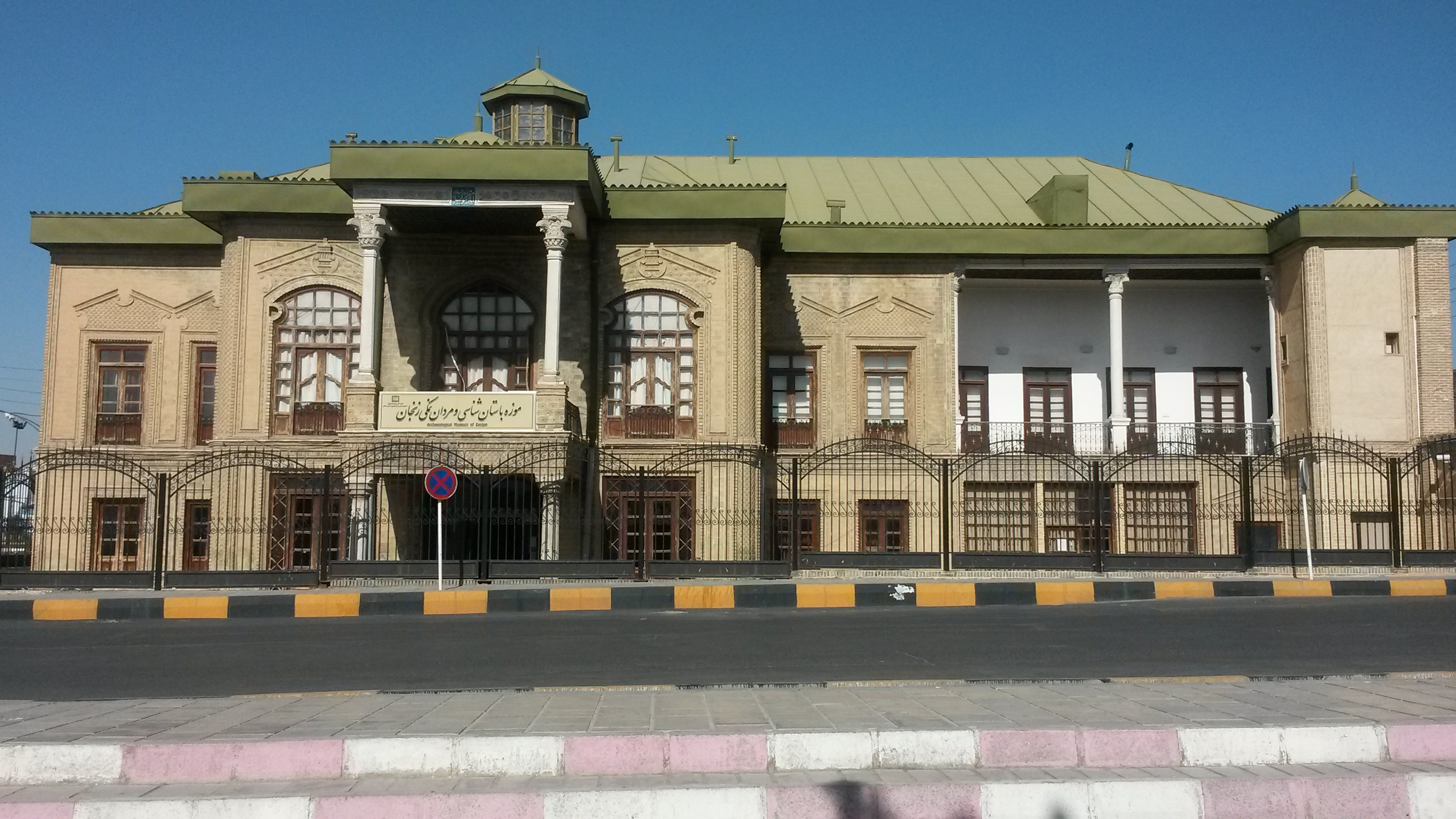
Archaeology museum of Zanjan

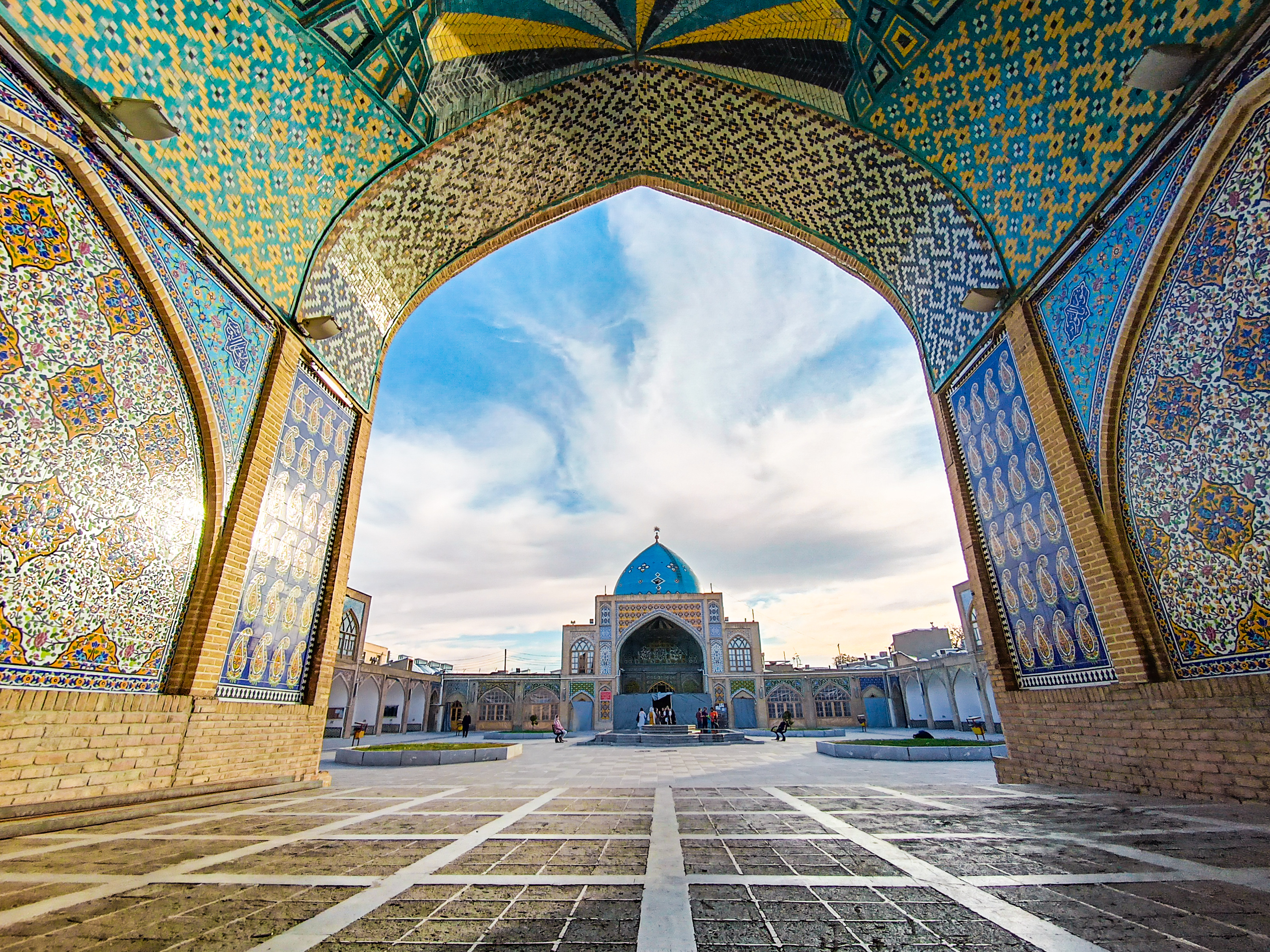
Jeme'h Mosque of Zanjan

Bazaar of Zanjan

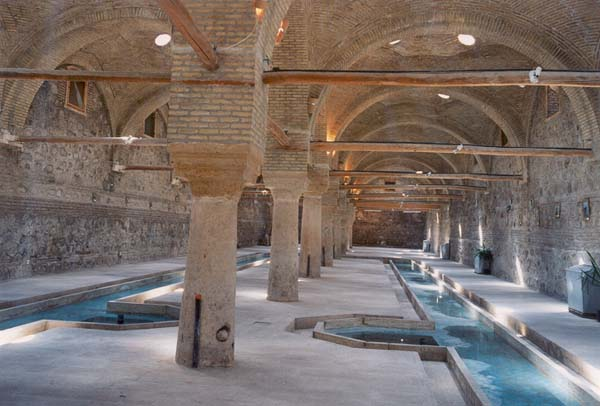
Rakhtshur khaneh, (traditional laundry house of Qajar era, Zanjan's Museum of Anthropology)

University of Zanjan

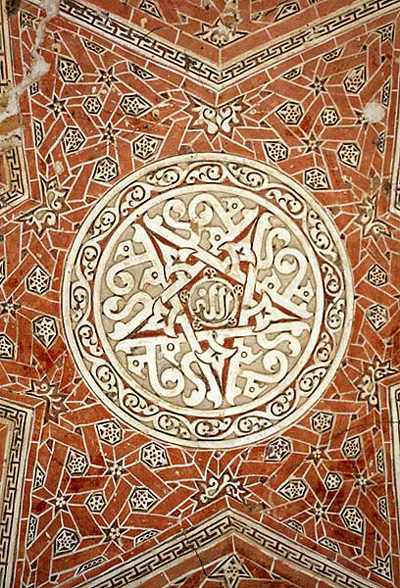
Soltaniyeh's tiles (interior designs)

== See also ==
- Rakhtshooy Khaneh Edifice
- Media related to Zanjan at Wikimedia Commons

== Sources ==
- Bosworth, C.E. (2002). "Zand̲j̲ān". In Bearman, P. J.; Bianquis, Th.; Bosworth, C. E.; van Donzel, E. & Heinrichs, W. P. (eds.). The Encyclopaedia of Islam, Second Edition. Volume XI: W–Z. Leiden: E. J. Brill. pp. 446–447. ISBN 978-90-04-12756-2.
- Le Strange, Guy (1905). The Lands of the Eastern Caliphate: Mesopotamia, Persia, and Central Asia, from the Moslem Conquest to the Time of Timur. Cambridge: Cambridge University Press.
- Mottahedeh, Roy (1975). "The 'Abbāsid Caliphate in Iran". In Frye, Richard N. (ed.). The Cambridge History of Iran: From the Arab Invasion to the Saljuqs. Vol. 4. Cambridge: Cambridge University Press. pp. 57–89. ISBN 0-521-20093-8.
- Yarshater, Ehsan (1988). "Azerbaijan vii. The Iranian Language of Azerbaijan". In Yarshater, Ehsan (ed.). Encyclopædia Iranica. Vol. III/3: Azerbaijan IV–Bačča(-ye) Saqqā. London and New York: Routledge & Kegan Paul. pp. 238–245. ISBN 978-0-71009-115-4.
