= 1887 in Iran =

- Decades
- See also: Other events of 1887; Years in Iran

The following lists events that happened during 1887 in Qajar era.

== Incumbents ==
- Monarch: Naser al-Din Shah Qajar

== Births ==
- October 10 – Reza Afshar, Iranian politician.
- ? – Abdulkarim Zanjani, Shiite philosopher.
- ? – Abolqasem Lahouti, Persian poet.
- ? – Ahmad Khonsari, Iranian grand ayatollah.
- ? – Ali-Naqi Vaziri, Iranian musician.
- ? – Govhar Gaziyeva, Azerbaijani actress.
- ? – Muhammad Taqi Amoli, Iranian ayatollah.
- ? – Rokneddin Mokhtari, Iranian police chief and musician.
- ? – Simko Shikak, Kurdish chieftain and outlaw.
- ? – Sulayman Hayyim, Iranian lexicographer and author.

== Deaths ==
- ? – Mirza Yusuf Ashtiani, Iranian politician.
