= Ipak =

Ipak may refer to:

- Eypak, a village in Iran
- İpək (disambiguation), places in Azerbaijan
- Ipak, Rahim Shahriari's album
