= Mirza Abutaleb Zanjani =

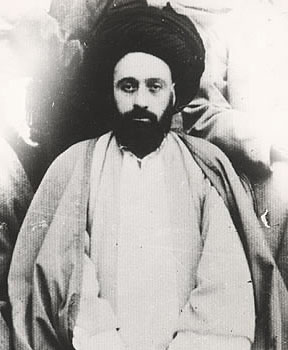
Mirza Abutaleb Zanjani

Mirzā Abutāleb Zanjānī (Persian: میرزا ابوطالب زنجانی) also known as Sayyid Fakhr al-Din Mohammad Abutāleb Mousavi al-Zanjānī (10 December 1843 – 16 March 1911) was an Iranian Jurist and Shia scholar.

He was born on 10 December 1843, to an educated family in Zanjan, Iran. His paternal ancestors were all celebrated scholars. He started his education in his birthplace and continued in Qazvin, Iran and Najaf, Iraq, training under the tutelage of Morteza Ansari, Sheikh Razi and Sayyid Hossein Kooh-kamari. He returned to Iran at the age of 40 and stayed in Tehran, where as a distinguished disciple of Koohkamari, he became the centre of clerical circles.

He spent most of his time teaching his students and writing religious books.

He advocated for Persian Constitutional Revolution, but later adhered to royalists.

He died at the age of 69 on 16 March 1911 in Tehran and was buried in Mashhad.

Zanjani was among the few scholars of the Qajar period who used their Arabic knowledge to translate Arabic texts into Persian. In addition to Persian and Azeri, he had acquaintance with French and Ottoman Turkish language. He also had knowledge of ideas of his contemporary European intellects such as Thomas Malthus and Charles Darwin, and used their views in his essays. Arthur Henry Hardinge, the British ambassador to Iran, wrote about him:"As I have previously mentioned, the most intellectual and enlightened Shia scholar that I've met in Tehran was Mirza Abutaleb Zanjani with whom we usually had debates about religion and politics. I personally think that Mirza Abutaleb worked on the same aspiration for Islamic unity as Abdul Hamid II ... although he himself had less faith to these principals".

He married a daughter of Bahram Mirza son of Abbas Mirza and had 4 daughters. He is maternal grandfather of Reza Zanjani.
