= Seyyed Mohammad Hosseini Zanjani =

Iranian Twelver Shia Marja' (born 1947)

- Title: Marja'

Personal life
- Born: 1947 (age 78–79) Qom, Iran
- Children: Three sons and a daughter
- Parent: Mohammad Ezodin Hosseini Zanjani (father)
- Education: Studied under Morteza Bani Fazl, Seyed Abolfazl Mousavi Tabrizi, GH Alam al-Hoda Sayed Ibrahim

Religious life
- Religion: Islam
- Denomination: Twelver Shia

Seyyed Mohammad Hosseini Zanjani (Persian: سید محمد حسینی زنجانی; born 1947 in Qom) is an Iranian Twelver Shia Marja'.

== Early life ==
Zanjani was born in 1947. His father Mohammad Ezodin Hosseini Zanjani studied under Muhammad Hujjat Kuh-Kamari and Seyyed Hossein Borujerdi in jurisprudence and Ruhollah Khomeini and Muhammad Husayn Tabataba'i in philosophy.

Due to his revolutionary struggle against the Pahlavi regime in 1973, he was exiled until his death. His grandfather Mirza Mahmoud Hosseini Zanjani studied under Mirza Naini, aqa Zia Iraqi, Sheikh al-Isfahani, Mohammed Kazem Yazdi and Mohammad Esfahani Qa'ravi), respectively.

His family lineage is the fourth Imam Ali ibn Husayn Zayn al-Abidin, the Shia. Hosseini Zanjani has three sons and a daughter.

== Education ==
At an early age his father returned and he took basic seminary courses. In 1964, he went to Qom and studied under Morteza Bani Fazl and Seyed Abolfazl Mousavi Tabrizi. After leaving Qom, he studied under GH Alam al-Hoda Sayed Ibrahim.

== Friday prayer ==
In recent years, various proposals for the adoption of Zanjan Friday prayer were rejected, preferring regional solutions.

== Migration to Mashhad ==
After the death of Mohammad Ezodin Hosseini Zanjani and the mass appeal of Mashhad seminary scholars, a group of his followers migrated to the holy city of Mashhad.

== Practical treatise ==
Zanjan published his dissertation in 2013. As of 2016, he had published four editions. His treatise is the only source of emulation based in Mashhad.

== See also ==
- Mohammad Ezodin Hosseini Zanjani
- Jameh Mosque of Zanjan
