= Ali Akbar Saremi =

Iranian architect (1943–2017)

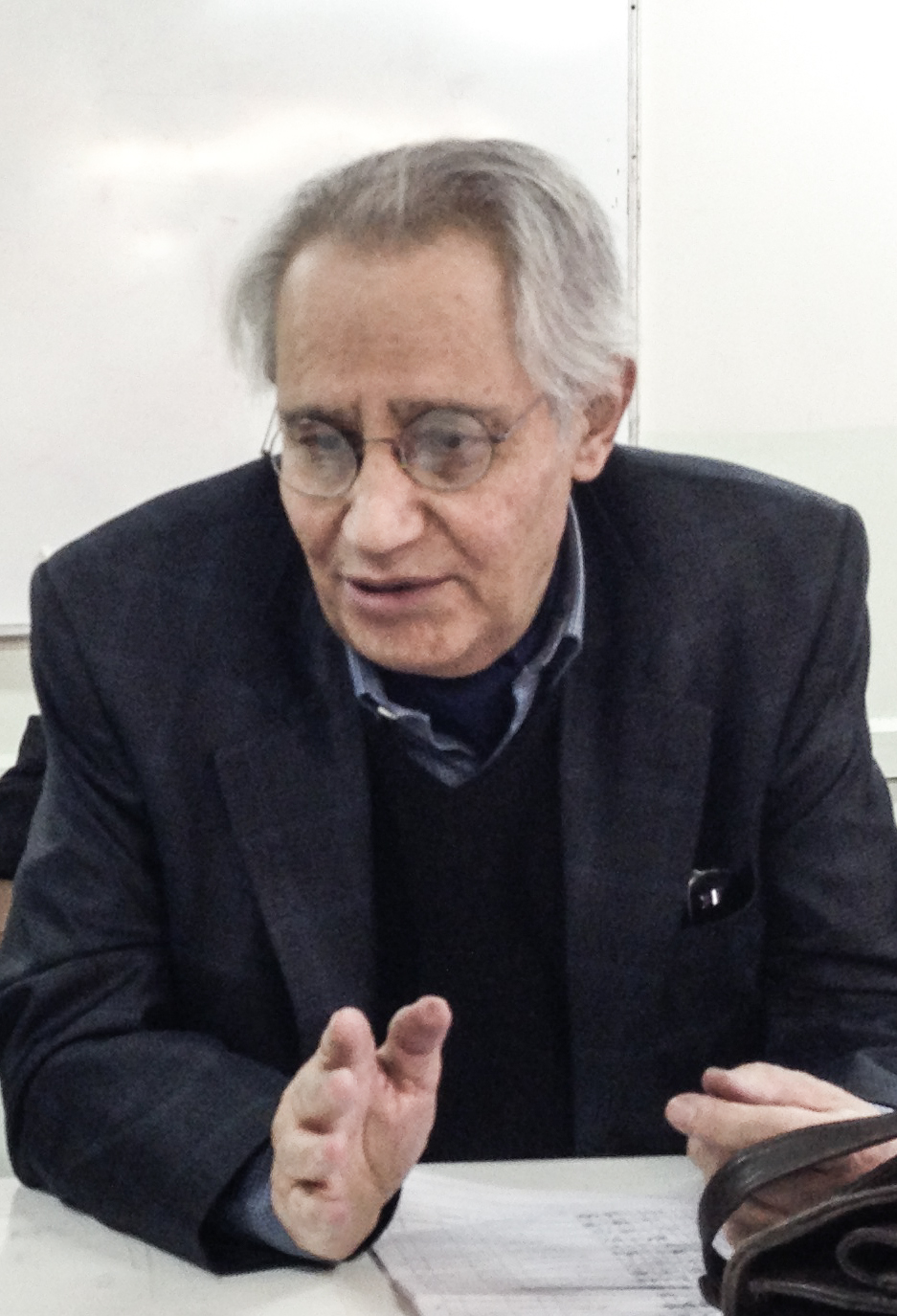
- Saremi in 2013
- Born: 28 October 1943; Zanjan, Iran
- Died: 21 January 2017 (aged 73)
- Education: Tehran University (M.A.), University of Pennsylvania (PhD)
- Occupation: Tajir Consulting Engineers
- Years active: 1974–2017

Ali Akbar Saremi (Persian: علی‌اکبر صارمی) (28 October 1943 – 21 January 2017) was an Iranian architect. Saremi earned a Masters in Architecture from the Faculty of Fine Arts, University of Tehran, in 1968. He got his doctorate in architecture under the supervision of Louis Kahn from the University of Pennsylvania, in 1976.

== Philosophy ==
Saremi is a well-known figure in contemporary architecture, for construction projects involving limited urban spaces. In an interview with Taghi Radmard (Bahram Hooshyar Yousefi) he stated: "We designed the building in this way that solve the issue of neighborhood (in case of a school for girls). Moreover, school became a happy space and a happy space needs happy and bright materials. Some colors, trees, light shadows have to hide, space for children to hide... Spaces do not have to be defined, only." He also spoke about Persian architecture.

== Career ==
After returning to Iran, Sarmi worked in the architecture office of Sardar Afkhami and in 1968 he founded his own office, Tajeer Consulting Engineers. He was Chairman of Tajeer Engineers.

Saremi was a lecturer at Farabi University (now known as the Isfahan University of Art) from 1976 to 1980. He was a lecturer at Islamic Azad University from 1994 to 1997, In addition to teaching at the University of Tehran, he has also published articles in prestigious architecture magazines.

== Projects ==
- Sarmi Villa, Nowshahr, 1973
- Afshar House, Zafaranieh, Tehran, 1974-1976
- Academy of Fine Arts, Karaj 1995
- The building of the Embassy of the Islamic Republic of Iran in Algeria, 2008
- The building of the Embassy of the Islamic Republic of Iran in Tirana, Albania, 2002-2004
- Kermanshah City Hall (Waiting Hall), 2004-2008
- Amphitheater of Pasteur Institute, Tehran, Tajir, 1988
- Embassy of the Islamic Republic of Iran in Albania, Tajir 2000
- Bloor Tower commercial building, Tabriz, Tajir 2001
- Commercial and cultural complex and city council, Mashhad, Tajir 2003
- Exhibition and office complex, Kish, Tajir 2004
