= Rahim Shahriari =

Iranian popular songwriter and singer (born 1971)

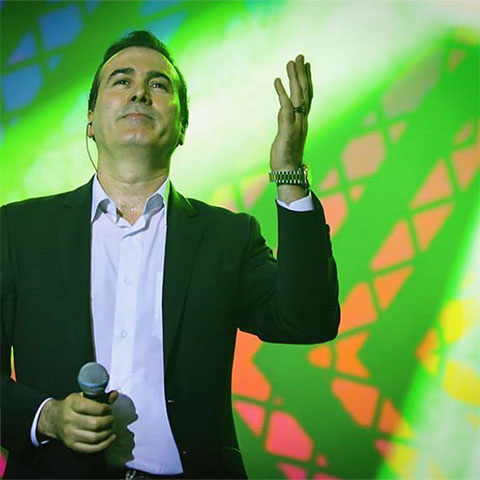

Background information
- Born: February 1971 (age 55)
- Origin: Tabriz, Iran
- Genres: Pop
- Occupation: Singer
- Instrument: Garmon
- Website: arazrahim.ir

Rahim Shahriari (Persian: رحیم شهریاری, Azerbaijani: رحیم شهریاری) is an Iranian popular songwriter and singer born in Shamqazan district of Tabriz, Iran in 1970. Shahriari is leader of the Araz musical group and has made several hits around Iran.

== Araz musical group ==
Araz (Azerbaijani: آراز) is an International Iranian Azerbaijani musical group. The group was created in 1996 by Rahim Shahriari. Music genre of Araz musical group is Azerbaijani pop music, folklore music and folk music. Araz musical group concerts are held in Tabriz, Urmia, Ardabil, Zanjan, Astara, Karaj, Bahman Cultural Center and Milad Tower. and international concert in United States, Canada and Europe.

== 1395 Nowruz (2016) concert in USA ==
He runs Azerbaijani musics concert in UCLA University, Turlock Community Theatre, Museum of Contemporary Art San Diego and Thomas Jefferson Community Center Theater in United States since 1395 – Nowruz for Iranians in the United States

== Studio albums ==
- Aghlama (آغلاما, means "Don't cry")
- Bayaz Gejalar (بیاض گئجه‌لر, means "White Nights")
- Baghmesha (باغ‌مئشه, means "Baghmesha(A district in Tabriz")
- Galmadin (گلمه‌دین, means "(You) didn't come")
- Getma Ghal (گئتمه قال, means "Don't go, stay")
- Gozallarin Gozali (گؤزللرین گؤزلی, means "Most Beautiful of the Beautiful(person)s")
- Ipak (ایپک, means "Silk")
- Kim Bilir (کیم بیلیر(می)؟, means "Who knows?")
- Sansiz (سن‌سیز, means "Without You")
- Yavash Yeri (یاواش یئری, means "Walk Slowly")

=== Albums detailed ===
Albums
Yavash Yeri (Official, Released: 0000)
No.	Title	Native	Meaning
1	Yavash Yeri	یاواش یئری	Walk Slowly
2	Yaninda Olum Garak	یانیندا اولوم گرک	I Must Be Bside You
3	Toy(Galin Galir Nazila)	توی(گلین گلیر ناز ایله)	Wedding(Bride Is Coming Slowly)
4	Bakhcalarda Barim Var	باخچالاردا باریم وار	I Have Fruits in Gardens
5	Yollarina Bakharam	یوللارینا باخارام	I Look at Your Ways
6	Soal	سوال	Question
7	Gal Barishagh	گل باریشاق	Come To Placate
8	Man Sana Neylamisham	من سنه نئیله‌میشم	What Was I Do For You
9	Bir Goei Banzirsan	بیر گؤیه بنزیرسن	You Looks Like Sky
10	Azari Giz	آذری قیز	Azeri Girl
