= Endoscopy Center of Southern Nevada =

Endoscopy Center of Southern Nevada is a private same day surgery facility localed in Las Vegas, Nevada. It is owned by Dipak Desai (65%), Eladio Carrera (14%) Clifford Carrol and Vishvinder Sharma.

In February 2008, the Southern Nevada Health District sent out notices to 40,000 patients informing them that they may have been exposed to Hepatitis C and HIV at the center from "unsafe injection practices related to the administration of anesthesia medication might have exposed patients to the blood of other patients". This was at the time, the largest such notification in the United States. This was the result of an investigation by the health district, the Nevada State Bureau of Licensure and Certification (BLC) and with consultation from the Centers for Disease Control and Prevention. Prior to this, the largest outbreak, linked to bad injection practices, occurred in Fremont, Nebraska, where 99 cancer patients were infected at an oncology center from 2001 to 2002. At least one died.

== 2008 Hepatitis C outbreak ==
The Southern Nevada Health District began an investigation into the center in January 2008 after receiving reports of two Hepatitis C cases, the normal amount that the Health District sees in an average year. The common factor was the Endoscopy Center. Later the Health District determined that five additional patients apparently contracted Hepatitis C after being patients there on the same day in September. The exposures are believed to have occurred between March 2004 and January 11, 2008.

The city of Las Vegas closed the center on February 29, 2008, when it issued an emergency suspension of its business license. The city denied an appeal of this suspension on March 3, 2008.

Investigations by the FBI and the Nevada Attorney General were announced to investigate the practices at the center.

On March 3, 2008, it was announced that the Las Vegas Metropolitan Police Department and the Clark County District Attorney would be conducting an investigation into shoddy medical practices that exposed patients to potentially deadly infections.

On July 17, 2009, the center, along with others involved in the problem, filed for Chapter 7 Bankruptcy.

In 2010, Depak Desai, a board member of the Hindu Temple of Las Vegas and a doctor at the Endoscopy Center, was convicted on 27 charges, including second-degree murder and insurance fraud. He was sentenced to life with a possibility of parole after 18 years. In 2017, Desai was moved from Northern Nevada Correctional Center to Renown Regional Medical Center in Reno. He later died on April 10. Desai was suffering from multiple strokes before his trial began in 2010.

== Related centers ==
Other centers involved in the investigation include:

- Gastroenterology Center of Nevada – multiple locations
- Spanish Hills Surgical Center
- Desert Shadow Endoscopy Center
