= Said Matinpour =

Iranian journalist (born 1976)

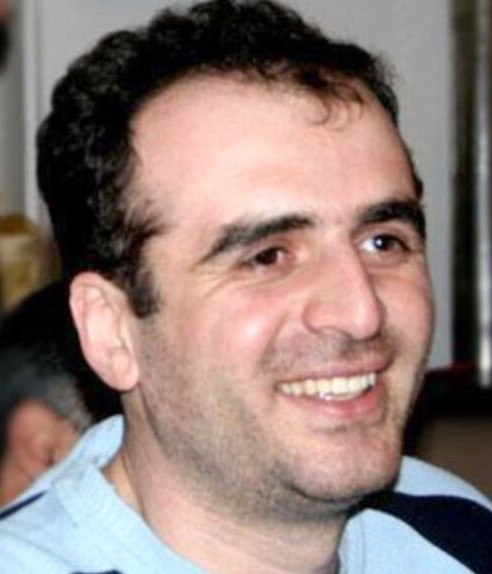
- Born: 22 September 1976 (age 49); Zanjan, Zanjan province, Iran
- Occupations: Journalist, activist
- Known for: Political prisoner, human rights defender

Said Matinpour (born September 22, 1976 in Zanjan) is an Iranian national cultural activist, journalist and former political prisoner.

In 2009, he was sentenced to eight years in prison by the Tehran Revolutionary Court. During his imprisonment, Amnesty International, Reporters Without Borders and the Committee for the Protection of Journalists called journalist Said Matinpour a prisoner of conscience and demanded his unconditional release.

He was released on August 26, 2015.

== About ==
=== Life and activities ===
Said Matinpour was born on September 22, 1976, in Zanjan. He graduated from Tehran University's Faculty of Philosophy. He worked in editorial offices of weekly magazines Omid-e Zanjan, Peyk-e Azer, Moj-e Bidari, Bahar-e Zanjan and Dilmaj printed both in Azerbaijan and Persian languages in Iran from 2005 to 2011. Yarpag newspaper covered the work of associations engaged in the teaching and promotion of Azerbaijani culture and the Azerbaijani Turkic language and published the works of local writers and poets.

=== Arrest ===
In 2003, after the Babek Castle Congress, he was arrested by Tabriz police and detained for two days. In 2004, after the Babek Castle Congress, he was detained by the police for one day in Ahar city. In 2006, he was arrested for a period of time by Ettelaat forces of Zanjan after the actions related to the National Uprising Day. On February 21, 2007, he was arrested along with his brother Alirza Matinpour after actions related to Mother Language Day. About 10 days later, Saied Matinpour, Telnaz Nemati, Alirza Matinpour and other activists were released on bail.

On May 25, 2007, he was kidnapped from his home without showing any documents and was detained in Zanjan Ettelaat office for 20 days. Later, he was taken to Evin prison in Tehran. After being detained here for more than 1 month, he was sent back to Zanjan prison. No information was given to his relatives about where he was kept from May 25 to July 3. He was only allowed to contact his wife on July 3 . Detained for 278 days in solitary confinement of Ettelaat prison in Zanjan. Here he was constantly tortured and interrogated. On August 27, 2007, his brother Alirza Matinpour was also arrested to put pressure on Said Matinpour. Matinpour. On January 28, 2008, he was released on $500,000 bail. It was possible to collect the necessary money after donations and foreclosure of the documents of 3 houses.

In 2009, Said Matinpour was sentenced to 8 years in prison by Judge Salavati at Department 15 of the Tehran Revolutionary Court. Matinpour was not provided with a lawyer when he was arraigned and was given only three minutes to defend himself. Although an appeal was filed against the court's decision it was not granted and Said Matinpour was accused of communicating with foreigners as well as conducting propaganda against the state structure of the Islamic Republic of Iran. On July 11, 2009, he was taken to Evin prison to serve his sentence.

In 2009, health problems arose. Because he was severely tortured during his arrest, and because he had some diseases before his arrest, his condition quickly deteriorated in prison. In addition, he suffered from headaches, backaches and dizziness because 30 people were kept in a place where only 10 people could stay. Although he applied for medical help many times, they did not consider his application.

On April 17, 2014, 31 political prisoners, including Azerbaijani prisoners Said Matinpour, Asadullah Asadi, Ismayil Barzigari, who were serving a sentence in section 350 of the Evin prison, were beaten by Iranian security officers Said Matinpour was later transferred to solitary confinement. He started a hunger strike to protest against this. His wife Atiya Tahiri also started a hunger strike to support Said Matinpour. As a protest against the violence against political prisoners, 66 prisoners started a hunger strike. They demanded an end to the violence, an apology from the prison administration, and the return of the convicts who were transferred to the 240th building of the prison and solitary cells after being beaten. Later, Azerbaijan]]i national activists Yürush Mehralibeyli, Behnam Sheikhi, Mahmud Fazli, Shahrukh Zamani, Aresh Mohammadi, Ismayil Barzgari Asadullah Asadi started a hunger strike in protest against the growing oppression and suffering against themselves and their families in Iranian prisons. After that, in support of the starving southern prisoners, national activists started a campaign called "Salam to Hunger". In support of this campaign, from Iranian Azerbaijan, dozens of national activists from the Republic of Azerbaijan, Turkey, Europe and North America held a 3-day hunger strike.

On July 28, 2014, he was released for three days to visit his family. While in Zanjan, his condition worsened. After being taken to the hospital, his leave was extended for a few days. On August 4, he returned to Evin prison located in Tehran.

On August 26, 2015, he was released a few months early in accordance with Article 134 of the constitution after serving 7 years and 2 months of his 8-year sentence.

== Objections to capture ==
In August 2007, Azerbaijani national movement activists, writers, religious figures and human rights defenders signed a statement regarding the arrest of Zanjan journalists Said Matinpour, Bahruz Safari and Jalil Ganilu. They noted that all three prisoners have a special place in the movement for the national cultural rights of Azerbaijanis and that their arrest was completely illegal and demanded their immediate release. One of the signatories of the statement, cleric Hojjatulislam Seyyed Heydar Bayat, noted that he had received reports that the detainees were tortured after being taken to Evin prison in Tehran, and noted that he was seriously concerned about their health.

On August 23, 2007, Amnesty International declared Said Matinpour a prisoner of conscience. The release, as well as a statement from the UK-based human rights group Frontline, stated that Said Matinpour was tortured to force a televised confession. The statement also notes that he was not allowed to meet with his family and lawyer after his arrest, and was only allowed a few short phone calls.

On November 21, 2007, the International Fund for the Protection of Human Rights Defenders, located in Central Dublin and having the status of Special Adviser to the Economic and Social Council of the United Nations, launched a campaign called "Strengthen one's protection". The purpose of this campaign is to collect signatures for the release of 14 human rights defenders whose lives are in danger in 12 countries, including Said Matinpour, among them, and to try to put pressure on the governments that persecute or imprison them.

In 2009, a group of Azerbaijani national activists organized an action in front of the editor-in-chief of the BBC channel in London. In addition to demanding freedom for Said Matinpour, they criticized BBC Farsi for not producing any news about Said Matinpour and demanded that they share news about him.

On March 12, 2010, during the match between Tabriz's "Traktorsazi" and Tehran's "Steel Azin" football clubs, football fans and national activists shouted slogans "Long live Azerbaijan, let Matinpour be free!", "School in Turkic language!".

On June 12, 2010, with the support of Amnesty International, Reporters Without Borders and Human Rights Watch, a flash mob was held in Paris demanding the release of Said Matinpour.

In September 2010, 808 Iranian public figures from Azerbaijani, Persian, Arab, Kurdish, Baloch and other ethnic groups issued an open letter demanding the release of political prisoners. The appeal was distributed by news websites such as "HARANA", "Savalan Sesi", "Rahi Karigar", Azerbaijan Democracy Center and other Azerbaijani and Persian websites. They protested the arrest of national activists, their detention in solitary confinement, often not being allowed to hire a lawyer, severe torture of some of the detainees, and not being allowed to see their families or make phone calls. Later, they demanded the release of dozens of prisoners, including Said Matinpour, who are still in prison.

In June 2011, Azerbaijanis of the World started a campaign to collect signatures for the release of five Azerbaijani political and cultural activists imprisoned in Iran. Signatures for the release of Said Mughanli, Ayyub Shiri, Said Naimi, Sima Didar and Said Matinpour have been collected through several websites.

On April 17, 2012, Amnesty International held a campaign in Vancouver, Canada, regarding the protection of Said Matinpour due to his serious health problems in prison.

In 2013, Tabriz University and the Union of Tabriz Medical University addressed an open letter to the newly elected president of Iran, Hassan Rouhani. The letter also mentioned the violation of the rights of imprisoned Said Matinpour and national activists like him.

On September 21, 2013, Amnesty International and the Association for the Protection of Azerbaijani Political Prisoners in Iran (ADAPP) organized a joint campaign on the occasion of the birthday of Said Matinpour, who spent the fifth year in Evin prison in Tehran. At an event held in the center of the Canadian city of Vancouver, city residents signed postcards addressed to the supreme religious leader of Iran demanding the release of Said Matinpour. In this appeal, in addition to the immediate and unconditional release of the prisoner of conscience Said Matinpour, the right of non-Persian children in Iran to be educated in their mother tongue was also requested.

On May 3, 2014, the international human rights organization Reporters Without Borders announced the list of "100 information heroes" dedicated to the World Press Freedom Day. In the list, journalists and bloggers distinguished by their brave activity in the direction of human rights and freedom, including the prisoner of conscience Said Matinpour.

While Said Matinpour was in prison, Amnesty International, Reporters Without Borders and the Committee for the Protection of Journalists called journalist Said Matinpour a prisoner of conscience and demanded his unconditional release.
