= Rakhtshooy Khaneh Edifice =

Coordinates: 36.6709°N 48.4849°E

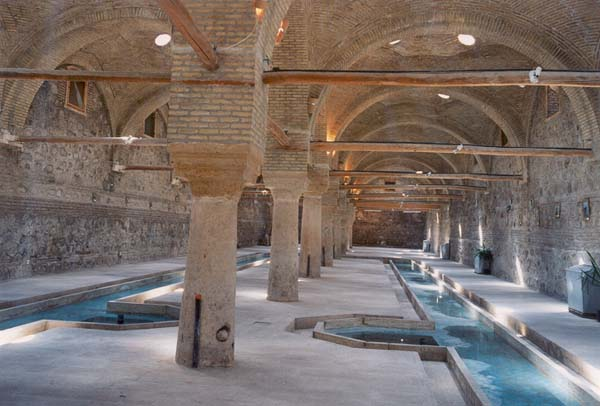
Interior view

The Rakhtshooy Khaneh Edifice (Persian: بنای رخت‌شوی‌خانه), also known as the Edifice of Rakhtshooy Khaneh, is a historical lavoir (a wash-house for clothing), which lies at the historical center of the city of Zanjan and was built in the 20th century. It was used for washing clothes by women who lived in city. The clothes were washed in four phases, with the washing beginning at one the end of the water canal and ending at the other.

It was constructed by two brothers named Mashad Akbar and Mashadi Esmail. Akbar was an architect and Esmail was a stone mason. This historic building is currently being used as Zanjan Anthropological Museum.
