= Qaflankuh Mountain Range =

Mountain range in Iran

Qaflankuh
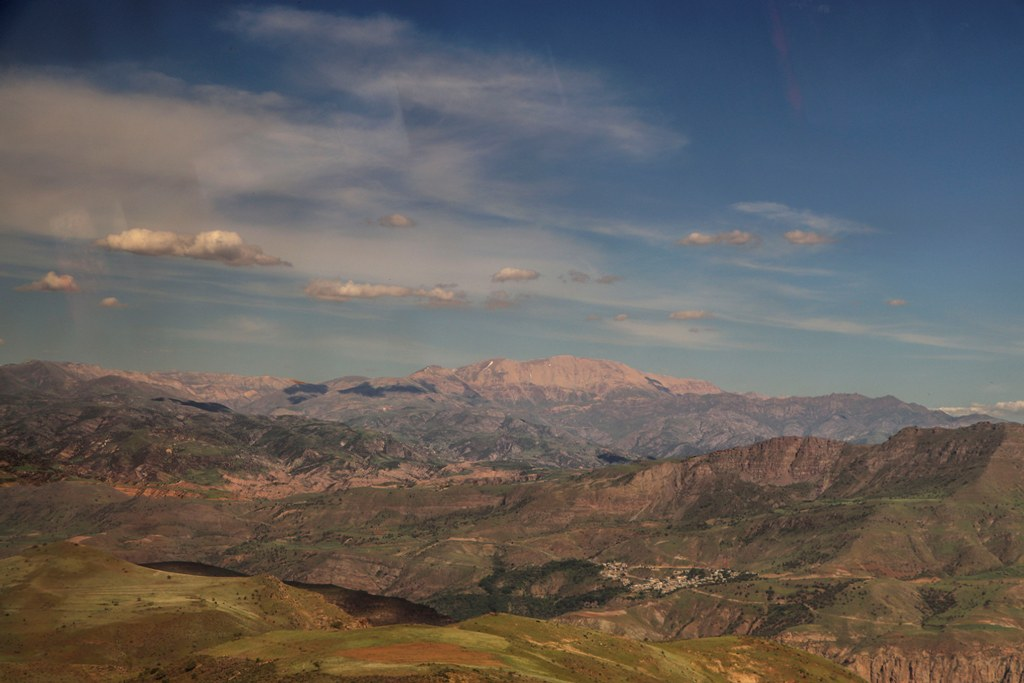

Highest point
- Coordinates: 36°52′7″N 48°41′36″E

Geography
- Location within Iran

Qaflankuh or Qaflankuh Mountain Range (Persian: رشته کوه‌ها‌ی قافلانکوه / Reshteh Kuh-hā-ye Qāflānkuh) is a mountain range that is located about 20 kilometres north of the city of Zanjan in Zanjan Province, Iran. With an average width of almost 20 kilometres and a length of about 100 kilometres, this mountain range is stretched in a northwest–southeast direction, beginning from northwest of Zanjan, passing north of Zanjan and ending southeast of Zanjan. The Qezel Owzan River flows in a valley that separates Qaflankuh Mountains on the south from Talish Mountains on the north. With an elevation of 2971 metres, Mount Sendan Dagh is the highest mountain of the range which is located in the southeast section of this mountain range. There are some mineral hot springs containing sulphur in different parts of this range. Geologically, Qaflankuh Mountain Range was formed during the Tertiary volcanism and plutonism and is made mainly of the Eocene volcanic rocks with very small sections of intrusive rocks in the northern and southern parts of the range.
