= Jameh Mosque of Zanjan =

Shi'ite mosque and madrasa in Zanjan, Zanjan province, Iran

Jāmeh Mosque of Zanjān
- مسجد جامع زنجان
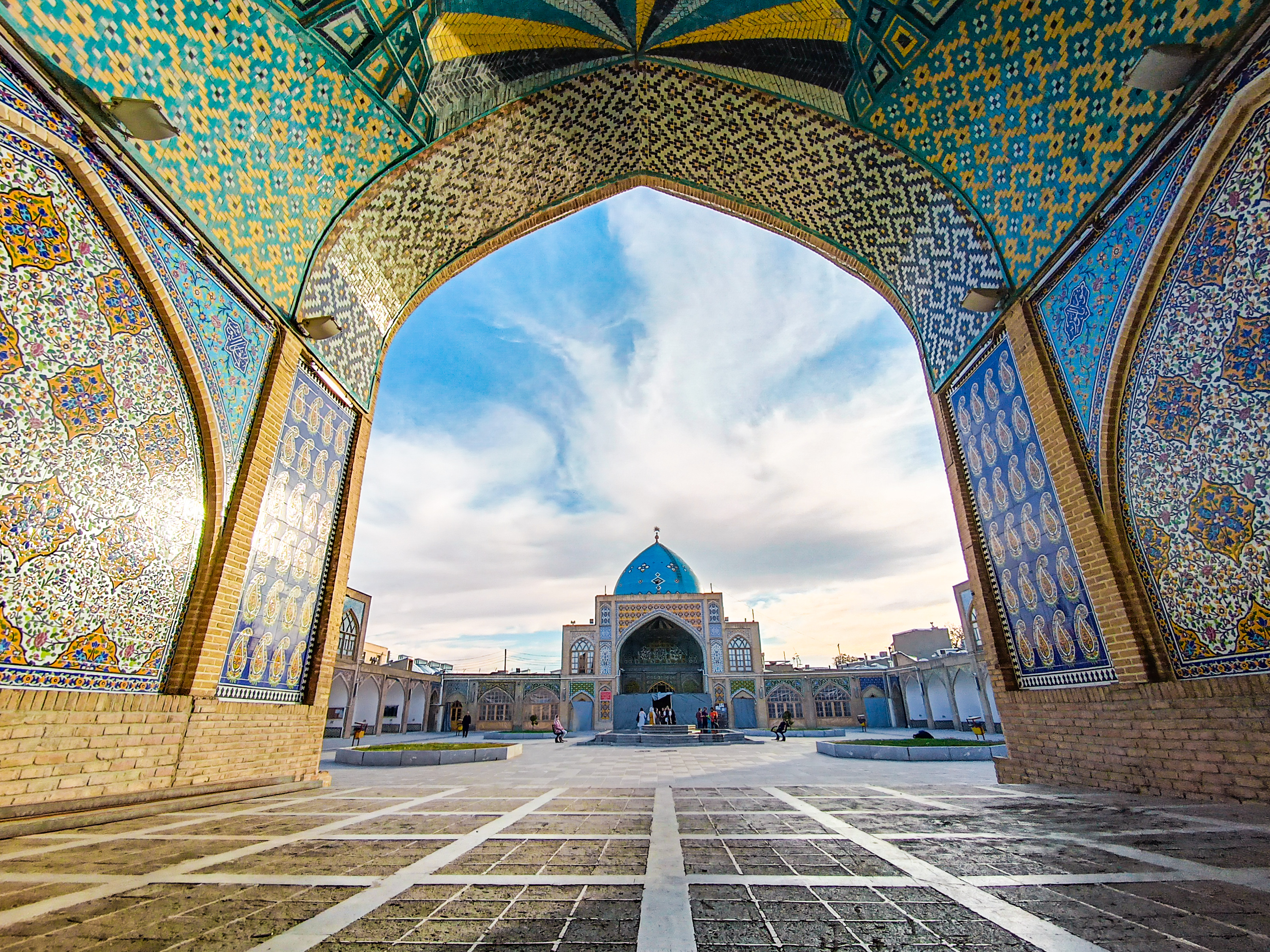
- The mosque in 2023, looking through the iwan to the sahn

- Location of the mosque in Iran

Religion
- Affiliation: Shia Islam
- Ecclesiastical or organisational status: Friday mosque and madrasa
- Status: Active

Location
- Location: Zanjān, Zanjān county, Zanjān Province
- Country: Iran
- Coordinates: 36°40′5″N 48°28′56″E

Architecture
- Type: Mosque architecture
- Style: Qajar
- Completed: 1826 CE

Specifications
- Dome: One (maybe more)
- Minaret: One (destroyed in 1959)

Iran National Heritage List
- Official name: Jāmeh Mosque of Zanjan
- Type: Built
- Designated: 30 April 1963
- Reference no.: 1056
- Conservation organization: Cultural Heritage, Handicrafts and Tourism Organization of Iran

The Jāmeh Mosque of Zanjān (Persian: مسجد جامع زنجان, romanized: Masjid-e-Jāmeh Zanjān; Arabic: جامع زنجان), also known as the Seyyed Mosque (Persian: مسجد سید, romanized: Masjid-e-Seyyed) and the Sultani Mosque, is a Shi'ite Friday mosque (jāmeh) and madrasa, located in the city of Zanjān, Zanjān county, in the province of Zanjān, Iran. The mosque is situated in the old part of the city and was constructed in 1826 CE, during the Qajar era.

The mosque was added to the Iran National Heritage List on 30 April 1963, administered by the Cultural Heritage, Handicrafts and Tourism Organization of Iran.

== Architecture ==
The mosque and school was built in the 17th century AH (1242 CE) during the Qajar era, it was initially named the Seyyed Mosque. The construction was carried out by Abdollah Mirza Dara who was one of the children of Fat'h 'Alī Shāh Qājār. It is located near the Zanjan bazaar. The mosque had a minaret that was destroyed in 1959 CE.

To the east and west of the sahn are sixteen chambers that are parallel to each other. Facing towards south are rise chambers used as residential quarters for theology students. The ceilings of these chambers are artistically decorated with diagonal arches that are 5 metres (16 ft) from the floor. The portions have beautifully vaulted and have arched ceilings. The chambers have also been worked in tile dating back to the Qajar era. The mosque has three places for nocturnal prayers, or Shabestan, each having an altar. The dome of this mosque is spectacular. The mosque contains four iwans on the sides of a large open court. The residential chambers have vaulted and arched ceilings decorated with artistic tile work.

== Gallery ==
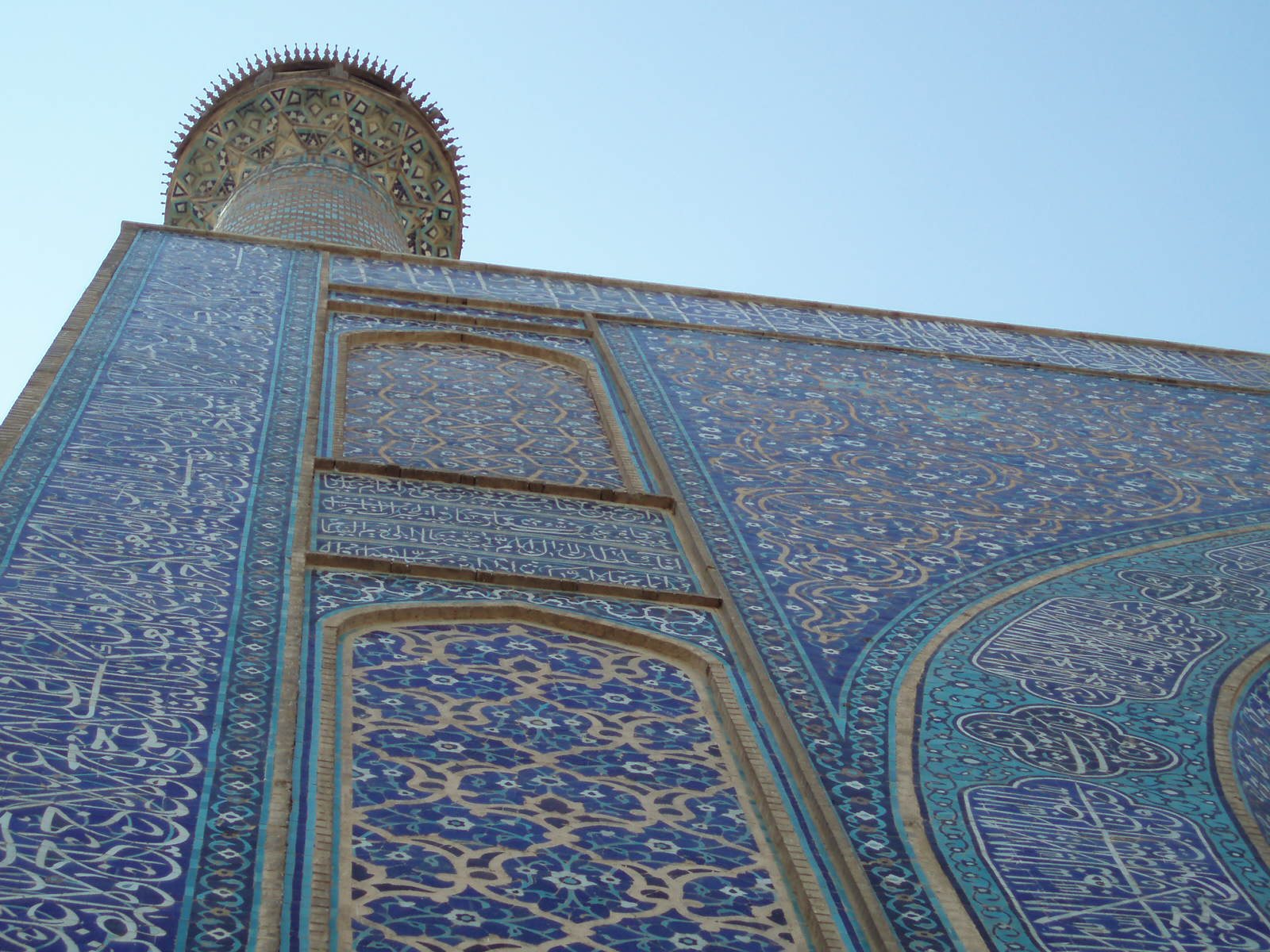

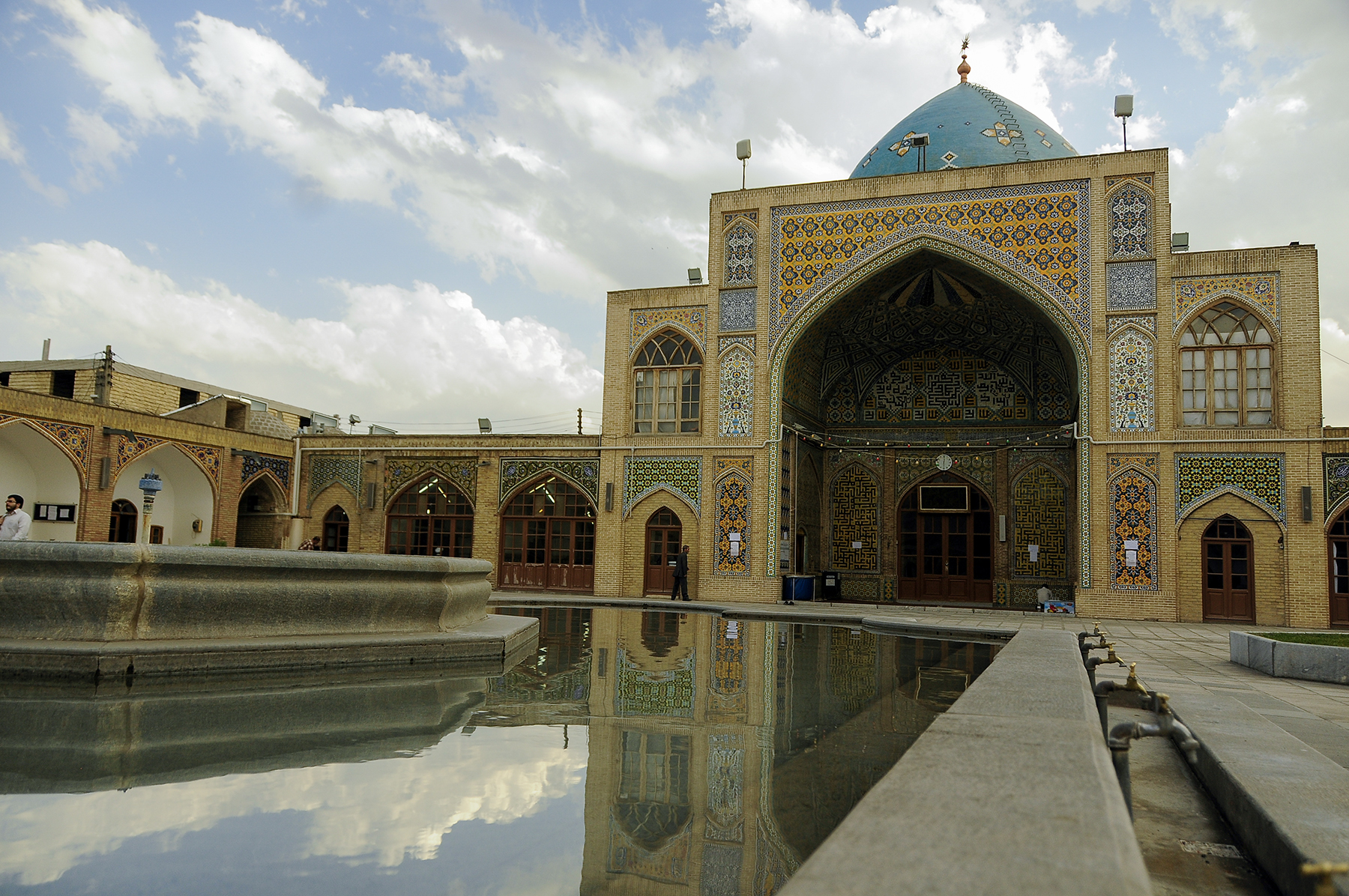

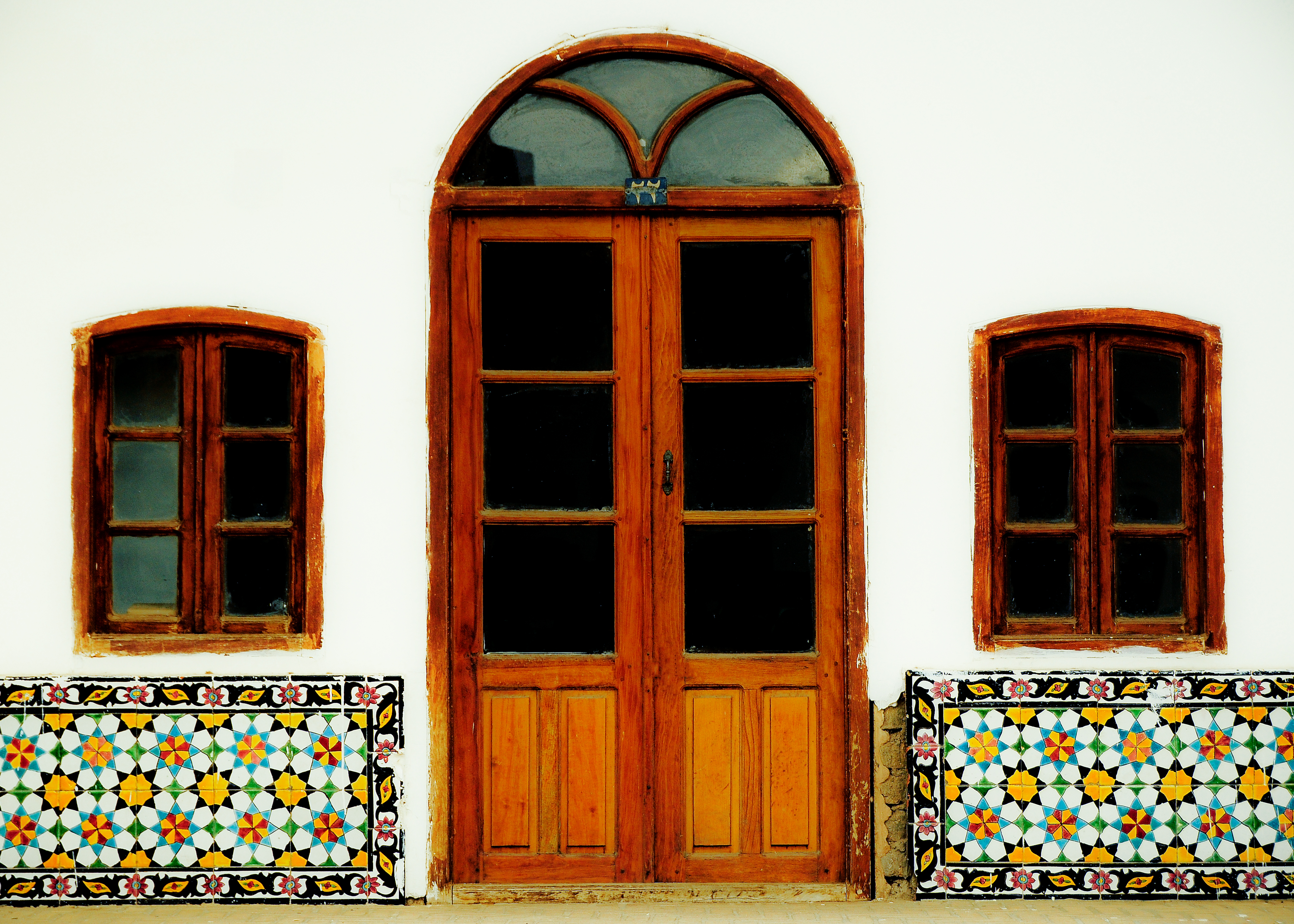

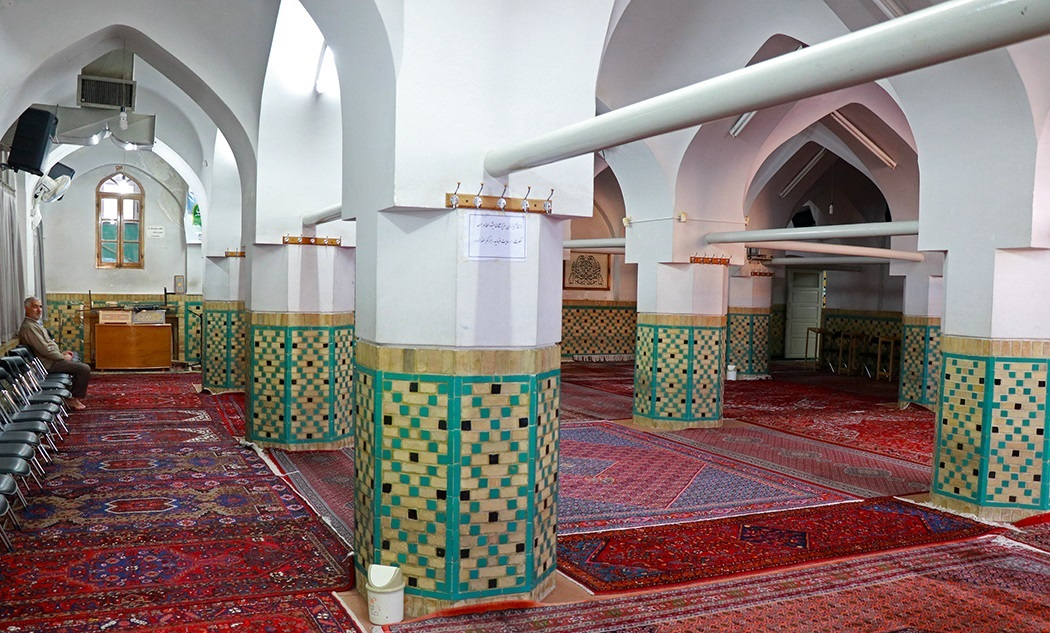

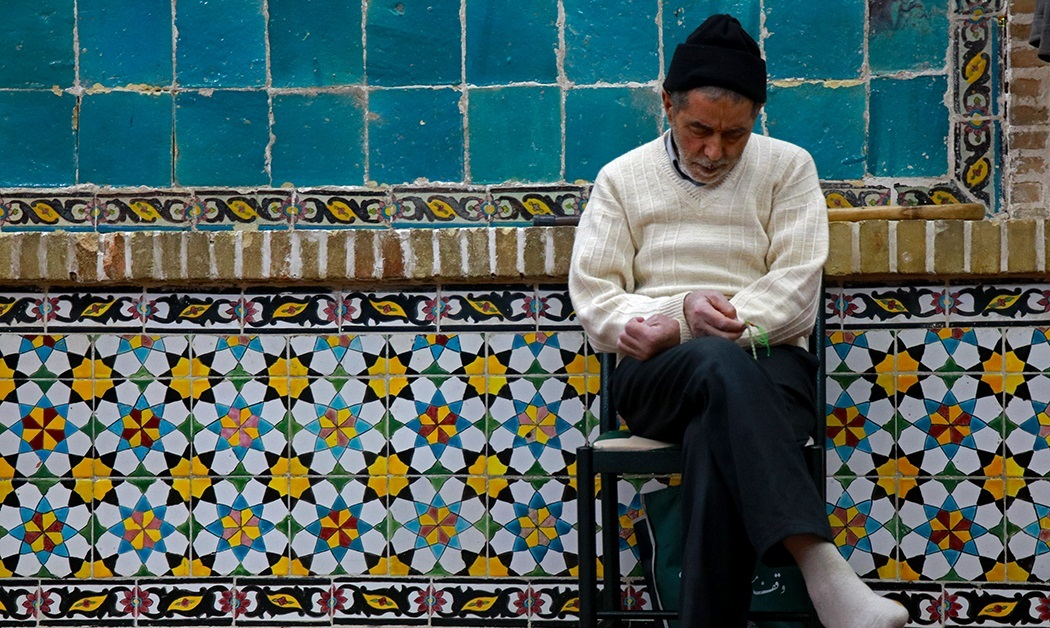

== See also ==
- Shia Islam in Iran
- List of mosques in Iran
- Holiest sites in Islam
