= Zanjani Sahib shrine =

Sufi shrine in Lahore, Pakistan

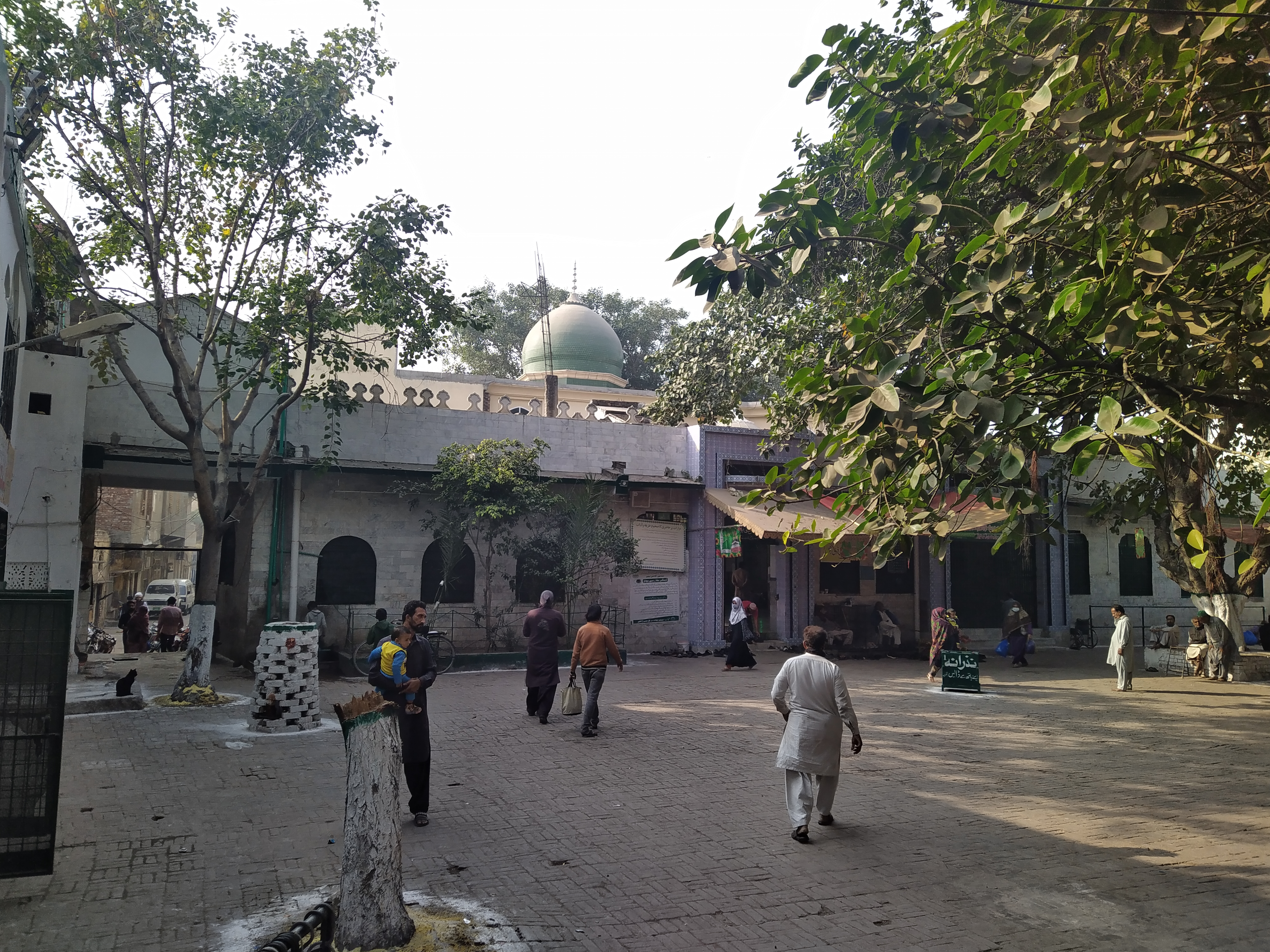
Zanjani Sahib shrine

Zanjani Sahib shrine is a famous Sufi shrine situated in the Chah Miran area of Lahore city, Pakistan. An early Sufi saint, Syed Miran Hussain Zanjani (died 1042 CE) is buried here. He is a Hussaini Syed and arrived from his native Zanjan in Iran to preach Islam in Lahore.
