= Hindu Temple of Las Vegas =

- Location in Nevada

Religion
- Affiliation: Hinduism

Location
- Location: Sumerlin
- State: Nevada
- Country: United States
- Coordinates: 36.188825°N 115.334903°W

Architecture
- Completed: 2001

Website
- www.hindutemplelv.org

Hindu and Jain Temple of Las Vegas is a Hindu temple located in Summerlin, Nevada.

== History ==
In 1994, Hindus in the Las Vegas area banded together to create The Hindu Society of Nevada. The land that would later become part of the temple campus was bought in 1997. In 2000, the temple started construction and by April 2001, the temple was finished.
