= Mohammad Ezodin Hosseini Zanjani =

Iranian Grand Ayatollah (1921-2013)

Grand Ayatollah Sayyid Mohammad Ezodin Hosseini Zanjani
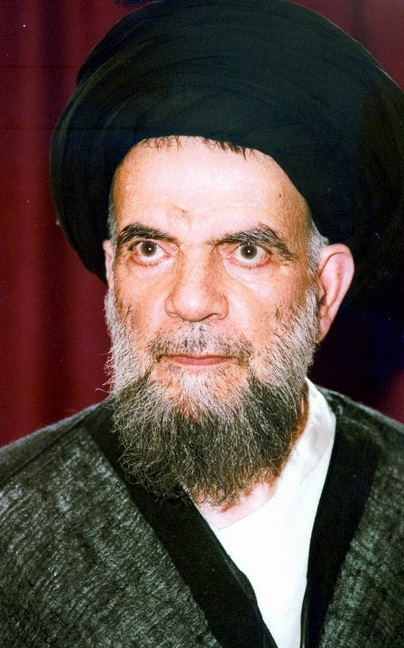
- Zanjani in the 70's.
- Born: 1 February 1921; Zanjan, Sublime State of Persia
- Died: 14 May 2013 (aged 92); Mashhad, Iran
- Other names: Imam Ezodin- Imam Zanjani
- Website: www.ab.alzanjani.ir

Grand Ayatollah Sayyid Mohammad Ezodin Hosseini Zanjani (Persian: سید محمد عزالدین حسيني زنجانی) (1 November 1921 – 14 May 2013) was an Iranian Twelver Shi'a Marja'. He studied in seminaries of Qom, Iran under Grand Ayatollah Seyyed Hossein Borujerdi and Ruhollah Khomeini, and also in seminaries of Najaf, Iraq under Grand Ayatollah Abul-Qassim Khoei.

== Life ==
Ayatollah Mohammad Ezodin Zanjani was born in 1921 - in a religious and learned family - in Zanjan (Iran). He was trained under supervision of his father (Mirza Mahmoud Hosseini Zanjani). At the same time the master Mirza Mehdikhan Vaziri taught him academic education and French language.it is considerable that before foundation of Qom seminary (in Iran) (Hozeye-e-Elmiyeh) by Ayatollah Hayery the other seminaries like Zanjani 's seminary were active and had particular situation in Iran. Scholars like Ayatollah Fazel Lankarani (father of present Lankarani); Ayatollah Rafea Ghazvini who is all professional in jurisprudence, philosophy and basic lessons (Osool) graduated from Zanjan's seminary.

== Sources ==
- Biography of Ayatollah Zanjani - written by : Bagher Hosseini zanjani - translator: Mohammad Sahabeh

== See also ==
- List of maraji
- List of ayatollahs

Political offices
Preceded by Was not composed	Imam Jumu'ah of Zanjan and Representative of the Supreme Leader; 1979- 1982	Succeeded by (Iran) Seyid Esmaeil Mousavi Zanjani
