= Abdulkarim Zanjani =

Iranian Ayatollah (1888-1968)

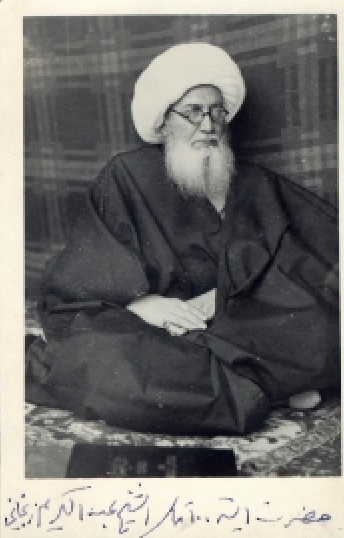

== Biography ==
Abdul Karim Zanjani was born in Zanjan, Iran. He later moved to Tehran to pursue his studies, where he developed an interest in the politics of Islamic nations. At age 22, he relocated to Najaf, where he studied under religious scholars Seyyed Mohammad Kazem Yazdi and Seyyed Mohammad Firouz Abadi. Zanjani is recognized for his efforts in reconciling different Islamic sects and for his role in developing Islamic philosophy.

His works encompassed subjects such as Avicenna, Al-Kindi, the development of philosophy, and discussions of jurisprudence (Fiqh).

Karim died in 1968 at the age of 80.

== Education ==
Karim received his early education at Immaculate Seminary Qazvin. For his higher education, he moved to Najaf, where he was taught by Mohammed Kazem Yazdi, Fethullah Qa'ravi Isfahani, Akhund Khorasani, Muhammad Hujjat Kuh-Kamari and Mirza Mohammad Taqi Shirazi.

== Return to Zanjan ==
Karim returned to Zanjan in 1908 to promote religion, attend to the affairs of the Muslim people, and train seminary students. There, Mirza Baqir Zanjani taught alongside teachers such as Sayed Ahmad Zanjani, a leading scholar in Qom during the Boroujerdi era.
