= Reza Zanjani =

Iranian Ayatollah (1902–1984)

Ayatollah Seyed Reza Zanjani (Persian: سید رضا زنجانی; born 1902 in Zanjan, died 4 January 1984) was a Shia Iranian cleric who first opposed the autocracy of Shah Mohammad Reza Pahlavi and then the theocracy that was established by Ayatollah Ruhollah Khomeini and his supporters following the 1979 Iranian Revolution.

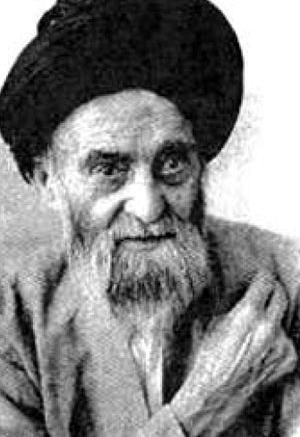
Ayatollah Seyed Reza Zanjanij

Reza Zanjani was an Azeri from Zanjan province in Northwest Iran. He was active in politics, supporting Prime Minister Mohammad Mosaddegh, and following Mosaddegh's overthrow in the 1953 coup invited nationalist and religious opposition groups to join the National Resistance Movement. In the years before the 1979 Iranian Revolution he is said to have "retained close contacts with the secular National Front as well as the religious-minded Freedom Movement of Iran." Along with Ayatollahs Golpayegani, Helani, and Mohammad Kazem Shariatmadari, he supported Constitutional monarchy for Iran, including the 1906 Constitution's original provisions for committee of Shi'a clerics to approve all legislation.

When the Islamic revolution established a constitution with a Shia jurist as supreme leader, Zanjani opposed it. In early 1981, he said of the Islamic Republic and its leader:

The monopoly of judicial and theological decision-making established in Iran is contrary to Islam. The title of Guide and Supreme Guide are not Islamic. No comparison can there be between the Catholic Church with its hierarchy and structure, and the leadership of the Shi'ites. Any pretension of this sort is not Islamic.

and

According to the unanimous opinion of the Imami Koranic interpreters and theologians, velayat-e faqih in an unrestricted form based upon the Koranic verse about the ulu al-amr [o believers! Obey those in authority among you. Q4:59] is exclusively reserved for the rightly guided Imams (peace be upon them!) For it does not stand to reason that God, all-Wise, would bestow the powers of the infallible Imam upon fallible human beings.

Zanjani advocated velayat-e faqih or guardianship of jurists where the jurists guarded not by ruling but by vetting bills of the parliament to be sure they were in accordance with Islam. This was established in article 2 of the Supplement to the 1906/7 Constitution "which, at least in principle, had been in force up to the revolution." It called for committee of five Shi'a clerics to be elected by parliament from a group of 20 mojtaheds. "Consequently", Zanjani considered the supreme ruling jurist and other jurist control in the Islamic Republic "to be superfluous and harmful..."

He was a very close student of Abdolkarim Haeri Yazdi founder of Qom Seminary and chairman of his Office.

He was a strong believer in establishing rapprochement with people of the book, namely Christianity, and Judaism.
