= Corruption in Iran =

Corruption in Iran is widespread, especially in the government. According to Transparency International's 2025 Corruption Perceptions Index, the Islamic Republic of Iran ranks close to the bottom in terms of perceived corruption of the public sector: 153rd out of 182 countries surveyed. While former Supreme Leader Ali Khamenei claimed corruption in the country is "occasional rather than systemic," independent observers generally view corruption in Iran as an instrument of national strategy and a core feature of the political order.

== In the Islamic Republic ==
Transparency International defines corruption as the "abuse of entrusted power for personal gain". Its annual Corruption Perceptions Index evaluates perceived corruption in the public sector of many countries (182 in 2025) on a "combination of at least 3 data sources drawn from 13 different corruption surveys and assessments. ... collected by a variety of reputable institutions, including the World Bank and the World Economic Forum". The 2025 Index scored Iran at 23 on a scale from 0 ("highly corrupt") to 100 ("very clean") where 42 was the global average. The country perceived to be least corrupt (Denmark) scored 89, and the two perceived most corrupt (Somalia and South Sudan) scored 9. Regionally, the average score among Middle Eastern and North African countries (Note: Algeria, Bahrain, Egypt, Iran, Iraq, Israel, Jordan, Kuwait, Lebanon, Libya, Morocco, Oman, Qatar, Saudi Arabia, Syria, Tunisia, United Arab Emirates, and Yemen) was 39. The best score in the region was 69 (the United Arab Emirates) and the worst scores were 12 (Libya and Yemen).

Since the current version of the Corruption Perceptions Index was introduced in 2012, Iran's score has steadily declined from its high point of 30 in 2017 to its lowest-ever scores of 23 in 2024 and 2025. Its score in the World Bank's Worldwide Governance Indicators has also declined, from 33.42/100 in 2018 to 29.75/100 in 2024.

=== Associated problems ===
As of 2019, corruption, nepotism, cronyism, (along with mismanagement and lack of "much needed" structural reforms), are blamed for the country's economic shortcomings such as the 50 to 70% of workers "in danger of falling into poverty", lack of job creation, poor housing, inflation, stagnating incomes and unacceptable rates of poverty. One of the objectives of the Iranian revolution was to have no social classes in Iran. Yet, Iran's Department of Statistics reports that 10 million Iranians live under the absolute poverty line and 30 million live under the relative poverty line. In 2016, then-president Hassan Rouhani linked social ills, including poverty and homelessness, to corruption. (These problems have often been attributed to the economic sanctions imposed by the U.S., but Hossein Raghfar, an economist at Tehran's Alzahra University, has suggested that they may be responsible for as little as 15% of Iran's economic woes.) A study of income inequality (by Djavad Salehi-Isfahani) found levels as discouragingly high (a Gini coefficient of above 0.40) in 2002, over 20 years after the revolution, as during Shah's time in 1972, "pointing to the lack of inclusive economic growth". Corruption or the uncovering of corruption has led to unrest in the form of riots, strikes, anti-government demonstrations—likely connected with the decline in economic growth corruption brings.

=== Characteristics ===
Ali Fathollah-Nejad describes the impediment to economic function and justice as a "political economy that favors regime loyalists... 'insiders' (khodi) or those with access to state resources and privileges also enjoy privileged access to jobs."

According to Iran International, the privatization drive that began around 2007 led mainly not to efficiently run private firms competing for business, but "quasi-governmental firms controlled by powerful insiders who earn economic rent from activities such as blocking competition", using public funds to stay afloat, "insider information to benefit from foreign exchange and gold price fluctuations when the government intervenes in the market", and circumventing sanctions to sell sanctioned goods at high prices.

An example of more explicit corruption in Iran (circa 1990s) came from Nobel Peace Prize winner, Shirin Ebadi, who gave up on the practice of commercial law as a waste of time, because in her words, "What was the point of knowing the case law and preparing a defense when decisions were decided by bribes?"

The Islamic Revolutionary Guard Corps has often been cited for its great power and privilege. According to Hooshangt Amirahmadi, director of the Center for Middle Eastern Studies at Rutgers University, "A lot of ministers and governors are from the Revolutionary Guard... They are using the money to buy loyalty and create power bases." Among the questionable activities the Corps has engaged in is the operation of an "illegal airport" near Karaj City—discovered in 2005—where it imported and exported goods "without any oversight". In 2005, the IRGC forcibly closed the then-new Imam Khomeini International Airport in Tehran, allowing it to reopen under Revolutionary Guard management.

In 2008 then-President Mahmoud Ahmadinejad vouched to fight "economic/oil Mafia" at all echelons of government. He also proposed that lawmakers consider a bill, based on which the wealth and property of all officials who have held high governmental posts since 1979 could be investigated. Out of the $700 billion earned by the state during the presidency of Ahmadinejad for the sale of oil, $150 billion could not be accounted for. On February 3, 2013, President Mahmoud Ahmadinejad played a videotape in the Iranian parliament that tied the heads of two branches of the government, the legislative and judiciary, to a documented financial corruption case related to the Larijani brothers.

Iranian Supreme Leader Ali Khamenei stated that although there "are cases of corruption; it is not systematic" in Iran. On the other hand, a Reuters special investigation found Khamenei controls a massive financial empire built on property seizures worth $95 billion. He also said in 2023 that malpractice and corruption were "contagious" and leading to instability in the Judiciary.

=== Causes ===
Some explanations suggested for corruption in Iran by Mohammad Hossein Ziya include:

- the lack of freedom of information undermining the ability of independent media to expose corruption;
- the lack of power among civil society and non-governmental organizations active in reporting and attempting to fight corruption;
- the lack of transparency in state-owned and semi-state-owned companies;
- the so-called circumvention of sanctions, which involve a small group close to the government and who are major culprits in corruption.

== In Pahlavi Iran ==
In Pahlavi Iran (Iran under the Pahlavi dynasty, from 1925 to 1979), corruption was a serious problem.

Stephanie Cronin of the University of Oxford describes corruption under the rule of Reza Shah as "large-scale". As oil prices rose in 1973, the scale of corruption also rose, particularly among the royal family, their partners and friends. According to Manouchehr Ganji who created a study group for Farah Pahlavi, Mohammad Reza Pahlavi was not sensitive to the issue, but addressed every now and then petty matters of low-ranking officials. As Ganji writes, the group submitted at least 30 solid reports within 13 years on the corruption of high-ranking officials and the royal circle, but the Shah called the reports "false rumors and fabrications". Parviz Sabeti, a high-ranking official of SAVAK believed that the one important reason for the success of the regime's opposition was corruption.

According to a report of a journal associated with The Pentagon, "By 1977 the sheer scale of corruption had reached a boiling point.... Even conservative estimates indicate that such [bureaucratic] corruption involved at least a billion dollars between 1973 and 1976."

In Michel Foucault's view, corruption was the "glue" that kept the Pahlavi regime together despite despotism and modernization.

After the revolution, the Central Bank of Iran published a list of 178 prominent individuals who had recently transferred over $2 billion out of the country, among them:

- Jafar Sharif-Emami, $31 million
- Gholam Ali Oveisi, $15 million
- Namazi, $9 million,
- Nasser Moghadam, $2 million
- "Mayor of Tehran", $6 million
- "Minister of Health", $7 million
- "Director of the National Iranian Oil Company", over $60 million

=== Corruption among the royal family and court ===
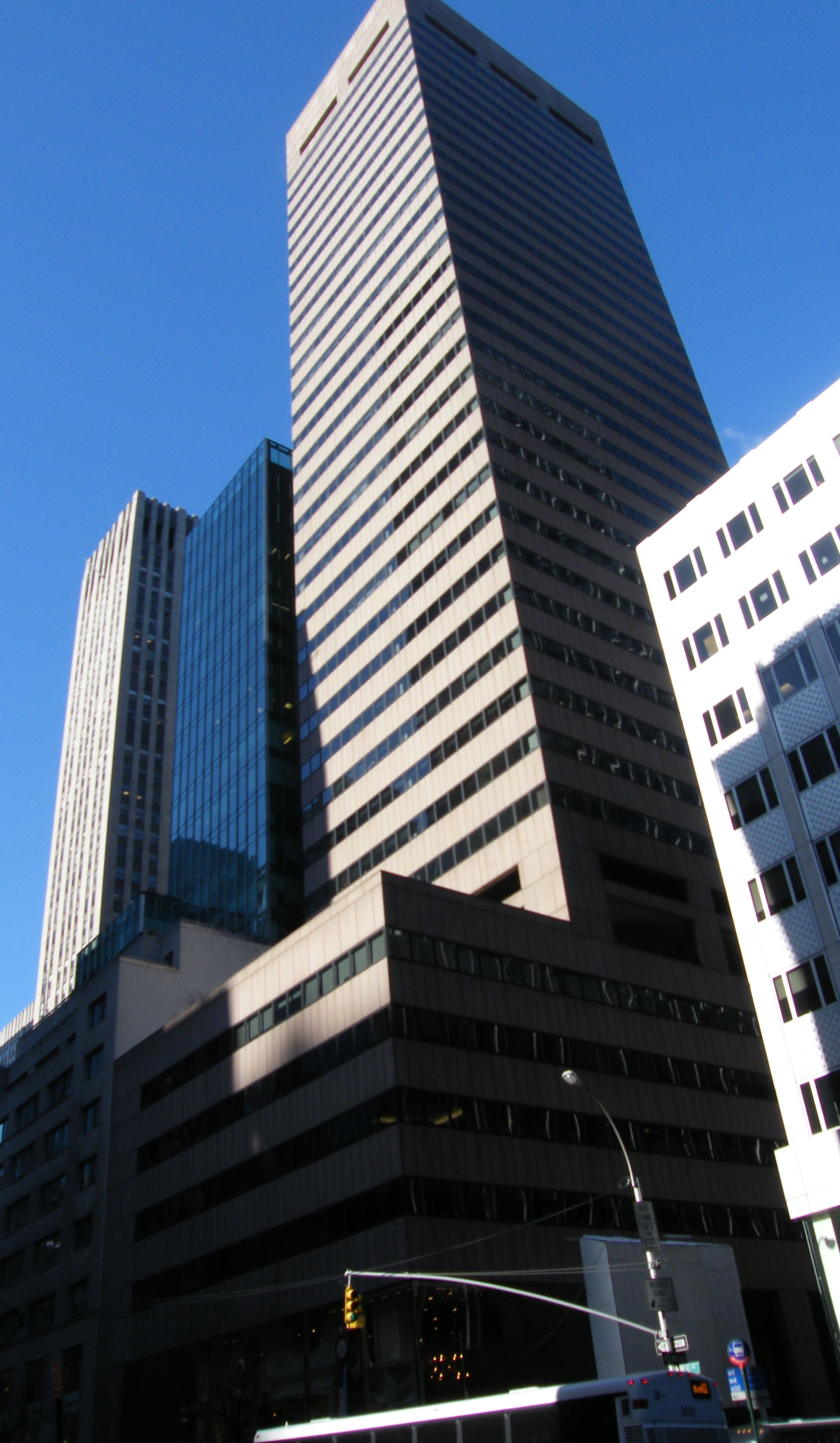
Piaget Building, located in Manhattan, New York was designed for the Pahlavi Foundation

Built up by forced sales and confiscations of estates, Reza Shah was "the richest man in Iran" and "left to his heir a bank account of some 3 million pounds and estates totalling over 3 million acres. A 1932 report of the British Embassy in Tehran indicates that Reza Shah developed an "unholy interest in land" and jailed families until they agreed to sell their properties.

In the 1950s, Mohammad Reza Pahlavi founded the Pahlavi Foundation (now the Alavi Foundation) which "penetrated almost every corner of the nation's economy". Bostock and Jones unambiguously declared the Pahlavi Foundation this "nominally charitable foundation fostered official corruption". According to Houchang Chehabi and Juan Linz, the Alavi foundation's $1.05 billion assets, $81 million capital and its declared devined $4.2 million was the "tip of the iceberg of official and dynastical corruption, outside and inside Iran". The foundation, which was one of his main wealth sources alongside estates left by Reza Shah and Iran's oil revenue, was a tax haven for his holdings.

Many members of the Pahlavi clan were among the chief perpetrators of corruption in Iran. The royal court was described as a "center of licentiousness and depravity, of corruption and influence peddling" in a mid-1970s CIA report. Prime Minister Amir-Abbas Hoveyda who served from 1965 to 1977 had no choice but to facilitate or condone "the ubiquitous corruption of the Pahlavi Clan" and ignore "the corruption that saturated the regime".

In 1960, there were rumours that Princess Ashraf, the Shah's twin sister was arrested in Geneva carrying a suitcase containing $2 million worth of heroin. She was regarded as Iran's main drug dealer until 1979. A 1976 CIA report declared that she has a "near legendary reputation for financial corruption" and her son Shahram controls some twenty companies that serve as "cover for Ashraf's quasi-legal business ventures". Prince Hamid Reza, Shah's half-brother, was ostracized from the royal family because of his widespread scandals of promiscuity, addiction and involvement in the drug trade.

According to William Shawcross, hundreds of call girls from Madame Claude's establishment in Paris passed through Tehran for Mohammad Reza Shah and members of his court.

=== Impact on the 1979 revolution ===
Some scholars have raised the point that widespread corruption among officials and the royal court led to public dissatisfaction and helped the Iranian Revolution.

In the Handbook of Crisis and Emergency Management, the Pahlavi dynasty is described as an example of governments losing legitimacy because of corruption and facing a public service crisis as a result. According to Fakhreddin Azimi, Professor of History at the University of Connecticut, "the unbridled misconduct of the Pahlavi clan undermined the Shah's proclaimed commitment to combating corruption and seriously damaged his credibility and Stature".

Right before the revolution, in a 1978 National TV appeal to the nation, Shah said:

I pledge that past mistakes, lawlessness, injustice, and corruption will not only no longer be repeated, but will in every respect be rectified... I guarantee that in future the government in Iran will be based on the Constitution, social justice, and the will of the people, and will be free from despotism, injustice, and corruption.

On the other hand, Khomeini repeatedly argued that the only way to eliminate corruption was through a revolution.

== Corruption and the IRGC ==
Much of the corruption in Iran is attributed to the IRGC and its economic affiliates. The primary rise in corruption was initiated in the beginning of the millennium when the Iranian government started to privatize. The Iranian government sold more than $120 billion in public assets. According to internal audits and parliamentary reports, over 80% of these asset were sold to institutions affiliated with the IRGC, bonyads, or state-controlled pension funds. In many cases, companies were sold via single-bid auctions.

For example, the 2009 sale of the Telecommunication Company of Iran (TCI) stands as the most notorious example of IRGC economic expansion. A controlling stake (50% plus one share) of the firm, valued at over $8 billion, was sold to the Mobin Trust Consortium, a group directly linked to the IRGC’s Etemad-e-Mobin. The "auction" was widely criticized as a formality, it was conducted behind closed doors in a single day without competitive bidding. This acquisition did more than secure a massive revenue stream; it handed the IRGC centralized control over the nation’s digital infrastructure, fundamentally enhancing its capacity for surveillance and censorship.

Another example is SADRA (Iran Marine Industrial Company), a struggling shipbuilding firm transferred to the IRGC’s engineering arm, Khatam al-Anbiya, during the 2000s. Despite substantial government investment, SADRA largely failed to fulfill its maritime contracts, serving instead as a conduit for absorbing state subsidies and securing lucrative no-bid military contracts. Simultaneously, the IRGC established a parallel financial system through institutions like Bank Ansar and Mehr Eghtesad Bank. Operated under IRGC-affiliated foundations, these banks issued high-risk, unsecured loans to Corps-linked contractors, effectively creating a "closed-loop" economy. Following intense international sanctions and internal pressure to consolidate military-linked banking, these entities were merged into the state-owned Bank Sepah in 2019 - a move that effectively nationalized their accumulated debts and transferred the financial burden to the Iranian public.

Another source of corruption is Iran's oil sector. In 2023 alone, the IRGC controlled 40–50% of Iran’s oil exports. with a worth of $25–30 billion, via its unofficial networks. The intake of fund by the IRGC drains state revenue, reducing funds available for infrastructure, education, and healthcare. Former customs officials and even members of Iran's Chamber of Commerce have openly acknowledged this issue. For example, in 2022, Masoud Karbasian, a former Minister of Economy, stated that "the country's largest smuggling operations are conducted by institutions we are not allowed to name", an unmistakable reference to the IRGC.

IRGC involvement in the oil industry also translates into a huge gasoline revenues theft that drains Iran from $4 billion revenues.

Iran oil export is conducted through trust networks, enabling Iran to continue generating income despite restrictions on formal banking and trade. Over the past two decades nearly 100 individuals or trust entities have managed to accumulate around 50 billion dollars in profits, profits are described as systematic corrupt rents. The consequences of the systematic corruption on inequality are alarming with 1% holding one third of the economy. The corruption and inefficiencies also have contributed significantly to the energy crisis in Iran, depleting oil reserves for the people.

The regime uses corruption to reward the elites that are responsible for its preservation. For example, on 13 March, Gholamhossein Mohseni Ejei, head of Iran's judiciary, stated in an interview with the state-run Shabakeye Khabar (News Network): "They say a pipeline has been extended from the airport to the sea for smuggling… This cannot be the work of an ordinary person." Mohammad Bagher Ghalibaf, the parliament speaker, remarked that "a powerful entity is behind fuel smuggling.". Iranian officials have publicly addressed the issue of fuel smuggling but have generally avoided identifying specific institutions. President Masoud Pezeshkian stated that "a few million liters of fuel are smuggled daily,"

== Corruption in Iran: Academic literature ==
Farzanegan and Zamani (2025) find that increases in oil rents lead to a statistically significant rise in corruption levels. This effect is most pronounced in the second and third years following an oil shock and can persist for up to seven years. The mechanism by which oil price increase translates into corruption functions in three chanals:

- Inflation: Oil booms contribute to higher inflation rates, which can create opportunities for corrupt practices, such as price manipulation and bribery.
- Military spending: Increased oil revenues often lead to higher military expenditures, a sector typically associated with less transparency and greater susceptibility to corruption.
- Erosion of democratic institutions: Dependence on oil rents can weaken democratic structures by reducing the government's reliance on taxation, thereby diminishing accountability and transparency.

Farzanegan and Zamani (2024) study the effect of a corruption reflection index on internal conflict in Iran using annual data from 1962 to 2019, and find a positive and significant response of protests to a positive shock in the news-based corruption reflection index. They show that economic growth and military spending are the main channels through which higher corruption may lead to higher internal protests.

Farzanegan and Habibi (2024) examine the impact of international economic sanctions, imposed on Iran due to its nuclear program, on the development of the middle class. They investigate how the middle class in Iran would have developed in the absence of these sanctions post-2012. They find that the annual middle-class size would have been approximately 11 percentage points larger, on average, without the post-2012 sanctions.

== See also ==
- Economy of Iran
  - Cryptocurrency in Iran
- Crime in Iran
  - Smuggling in Iran
    - Fuel smuggling in Iran
- History of the Islamic Republic of Iran
- Aghazadeh

Notable cases

- Banking cases
  - 2011 Iranian embezzlement scandal
- Fatemi Circle
- Shahram Jazayeri
- Marjan Sheikholeslami Aleagha
- Mahafarid Amir Khosravi
- Mahmoud Reza Khavari
- Mehdi Hashemi Rafsanjani
- Babak Zanjani
- Water Mafia in Iran

Institutions in charge of fighting corruption

- General Inspection Office
- Supreme Audit Court of Iran
- Islamic Revolutionary Court
