= Iran Insurance embezzlement case =

Embezzlement scandal

- Court: Supreme Court of Iran, Branch 32
- Decided: August 24, 2014

Case history
- Appealed from: Tehran Province Crime Court, Branch 76

Court membership
- Judges sitting: Judge Modir-Khorasani; Judge Zabihizadeh; Judge Mohammadi-Kashkouli

Keywords
- Embezzlement; Forgery; Bribery; Money laundering; Acquisition of illicit property

The Iran Insurance embezzlement case refers to an embezzlement scandal within the state-owned Iran Insurance Company, publicized in November 2010. Key figures behind the scandal included a clique of statesmen within the government of Mahmoud Ahmadinejad, known as the Fatemi Circle. The case was controversially appealed at the same time with 2011 Iranian embezzlement scandal.

== Convicted people ==
=== 2014 ===
On 24 August 2014, the fate of the 12 suspects were decided.

#	Name	Conviction	Prison	Money Return (Rials)	Fine (Rials)	Other penalties
1	Mostafa Hamzeh-Nosi	forming embezzlement network forgery	Life sentence	33,296,089,620	64,092,179,240	banned for life from government work
2	Davoud Fahimi-Roudposhti	forming embezzlement network forgery	Life sentence	35,796,089,920	66,592,172,240	banned for life from government work
3	Badiollah Kiani	forming embezzlement network forgery	25 years	10,750,574,330	61,592,179,240	banned for life from government work
4	Jaber Abdali	forming embezzlement network forgery	15 years	18,500,000,000	37,000,000,000	
5	Mohammad-Taghi Tavakkoli	bribe taking	8 years	—	1,000,000,000	banned from government work
6	Ali Jalil	bribe taking	5 years	—	7,000,000,000	
7	Shahriar Khosravi	bribe taking	9 years	—	5,000,000,000	
8	Mahmoud Bagheri-Zamani	contribution in embezzlement	1½ years	1,390,000,000	2,780,000,000	
9	Iraj Abdolhamidi	assisting embezzlement	1 year	135,000,000	270,000,000	
10	Fariborz Farid-Danesh	assisting embezzlement and forgery	½ year	980,500,000	1,861,000,000	
11	Davoud Sarkhosh-Shahri	bribe taking	3 years	1,700,000,000	—	
12	Yousef-Ali Darounparvar		11 years	—	—	

=== 2015 ===
Former First Vice President of Iran, Mohammad-Reza Rahimi was convicted of "Illegal acquisition of illicit property" and accepting bribes and was sentenced to 5 years and 91 days in prison, ordered to return 8,500,000,000 rials and fined 10,000,000,000 rials.
