= 2011 Iranian embezzlement scandal =

The 3,000 billion toman embezzlement scandal in Iran (also 2,800 billion embezzlement; approximately US$943.5 million) was a corruption scandal involving the use of forged documents to obtain credit from at least seven Iranian state and private banks to purchase recently privatized state-owned companies. The fraud reportedly extended over a four-year period, but became more serious in the months before the scandal broke in September 2011. According to Iranian newspapers, Iranian businessman Mahafarid Amir Khosravi (also known as Amir-Mansour Aria) masterminded the scam, and as of late October 2011, at least 67 people have been interrogated and 31 of them have been arrested, with Aria being executed in 2014.

Mostafa Pour Mohammadi, the head of a judicial investigations unit, has called the case "the most unprecedented financial corruption case in the history of Iran." The scandal has also been called "politically sensitive", involving Esfandiar Rahim Mashaei, a close aide to President Mahmoud Ahmadinejad, opposed by conservatives.

== Overview ==
According to Iranian government newspapers and TV channels, the fraud was planned within seven state-owned and private banks, including Saderat Bank of Iran, and is the largest corruption scandal in Iranian history. The fraud was first identified at Bank Melli, Iran's largest commercial bank.

According to The New York Times and The Washington Post, the embezzlement was a "scheme to use forged documents or letters of credit to acquire assets, "including major state-owned companies" or "privatized government assets", (such as the Khuzestan Steel Company, a major steel producer) at one of Iran's largest banks, Bank Saderat.

Iranian state prosecutor Gholam-Hossein Mohseni-Eje'i said 19 people had been arrested for being involved in the embezzlement scandal. The Washington Post reports that 22 suspects, "including businessmen and bank officials" have been arrested, and the chiefs of two banks have been dismissed. On 27 September 2011, Mahomud-Reza Khavari abruptly resigned as the managing director of Bank Melli and fled to Canada after the bank was implicated in the fraud. However, a spokesman for the bank stated that Khavari had gone to Canada for "ordinary business reasons". According to the Globe and Mail, Mahmoud Reza Khavari owned a $3 million house in Toronto under his own name, and according to Iran News Update, Khavari allegedly acquired Canadian citizenship in 2005.

The investigation determined that businessman Mahafarid Amir Khosravi had masterminded the scheme, with his Aria Investment Development Company being the primary recipient of the loans. Khosravi was convicted of embezzlement, money laundering, and bribery. He and three of his closest associates received the death penalty in July 2012. A total of 39 people were convicted of fraud in the case. On 24 May 2014, Khosravi was executed by hanging, while Khavari remains a fugitive. However, Khosravi’s lawyer said that he was made unaware of Khosravi’s execution, according to the IB Times. According to the BBC, the Iranian chief prosecutor said that two other defendants were sentenced to life in prison, whereas 33 more are set to receive prison sentences as high as 35 years.

== Reaction ==
=== Supreme Leader ===
On 3 October 2011, Supreme Leader Ayatollah Ali Khamenei told the viewers of Iranian state TV, "People should know all these (responsible) will be pursued. ... God willing, the traitorous hands will be cut." The leader also stated the media should not use the case to "strike at officials."

=== Parliament ===
The speaker of the Iranian parliament, Ali Larijani, said that all three branches of the government were determined to deal with the recent banking scandal. Ahmad Tavakkoli, a member of parliament, said on 18 September 2011 that the embezzlement of 28 trillion rials (3,000 billion toman) is an intolerable scandal, adding that if administration officials are not able to handle the affairs, they should step down. In addition, he said that a number of members of parliament have introduced a motion, which envisages the establishment of a special committee to pursue the embezzlement case. With reference to top ranking Iranian government officials, the judiciary mentioned earlier that such a high level of corruption couldn’t have occurred without the support of various people, according to the Reuters report.

According to Al Jazeera, a defendant argued that senior officials associated with the scandal had walked away, while individuals with low-level involvement had been intensely prosecuted by the judiciary.

=== Mahmoud Ahmadinejad ===
On 16 September 2011, Iranian President Mahmoud Ahmadinejad rejected the accusations against some of his administration's officials. Conservative critics of Ahmadinejad have accused his close aide, Esfandiar Rahim Mashaei (whom the conservatives strongly oppose) of having connections with Amir-Mansour Aria. According to CNN, the allegation linked to the president concerning the embezzlement of over $2.5 billion is one out of many allegations by Islamists.

== See also ==
- Fatemi Circle
- Iran Insurance embezzlement case
- Banking in Iran
- Corruption in Iran
