= Mohammad Reza Rahimi =

Iranian politician

- محمدرضا رحيمی
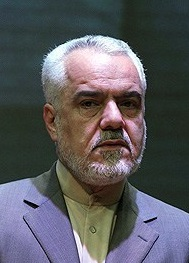
- Rahimi in 2013

5th First Vice President of Iran
- In office 13 September 2009 – 5 August 2013
- President: Mahmoud Ahmadinejad
- Preceded by: Esfandiar Rahim Mashaei
- Succeeded by: Eshaq Jahangiri

Vice President of Iran for Legal and Parliamentary Affairs
- In office 25 May 2008 – 13 September 2009
- President: Mahmoud Ahmadinejad
- Preceded by: Majid Jafarzadeh
- Succeeded by: Mohammad Reza Mirtajodini (Parliamentary Affairs); Fatemeh Bodaghi (Legal Affairs)

Head of Supreme Audit Court
- In office 1 November 2004 – 20 July 2008
- Preceded by: Kazem Mirvalad
- Succeeded by: Abdolreza Rahmani Fazli

Governor of Kurdistan Province
- In office 17 October 1993 – 14 September 1997
- President: Akbar Hashemi Rafsanjani
- Preceded by: Hassan Zohree
- Succeeded by: Abdollah Ramezanzadeh

Member of the Parliament of Iran
- In office 28 May 1984 – 17 October 1993
- Constituency: Qorveh (2nd and 3rd Majlis); Sanandaj (4th Majlis)
- Majority: 107,666 (39.9%; 4th Majlis)

Personal details
- Born: 11 January 1949 (age 77) Serishabad, Iran
- Spouse: Latifeh Erfani (−2015)
- Children: 2
- Education: Tehran University
- Profession: Prosecutor
- Awards: Order of Service (1st class)

Mohammad Reza Rahimi (Persian: محمدرضا رحيمی, born on 11 January 1949) is an Iranian politician who served as the fifth first vice president from 13 September 2009 until 3 August 2013. His previous posts included governor of the Kurdistan province and vice president for parliamentary affairs.

On 15 February 2015, Rahimi was convicted of corruption and is currently jailed in Evin Prison. He was allegedly head of the "Fatemi Circle".

== Early life and education ==
Rahimi was born into a Kurdish Shiite family in a village, Serishabad, in Iran's Kurdistan province. He received a law degree from Tehran University. Rahimi also claims to hold a PhD from Oxford University but no record of his name has been found in the university and also this claim has been vastly disputed by many Iranian sources. Rahimi is considered to be the second high-ranking member of Ahmadinejad's administration to have lied about receiving a PhD from Oxford University, the other being Ali Kordan. He has also claimed to have a PhD from Belford University, characterized as "just one of hundreds of diploma mills easily accessible online." Alef, an Iranian site that belongs to Ahmad Tavakkoli, published documents purporting to show fraudulent documents created by Rahimi.

== Career ==
Rahimi worked as a public prosecutor in Qorveh and Sanandaj. He headed the city council of Sanandaj, too. During this period, he taught law at the school of law at Tehran Azad University and served as head of the school for a short time.

Rahimi was elected as member of the Parliament of Iran from his province of birth Kurdistan in Legislative election of 1980 as a member of Islamic Republican Party. He was in Parliament until 1992 when he resigned from his seat. He held many positions when he was an MP such as head of arts commission and a member of foreign policy commission. Then he was appointed governor of the Kurdistan Province in August 1993 by then-president Akbar Hashemi Rafsanjani and was in office until August 1997 when Mohammad Khatami was elected as new president and named new governors. Rahimi was not in Khatami's list of governors. During his governorship, he firstly met Mahmoud Ahmedinejad.

Ahmadinejad named Rahimi as his vice president for legal and parliamentary affairs in 2008. He was appointed as the 5th first vice president of Iran on 13 September 2009 in a declaration by the president Mahmoud Ahmadinejad and succeeded Esfandiar Rahim Mashaei who was in office for a short time.

He was acting president of Iran from 20 April 2011 to 1 May 2011 when president Ahmadinejad boycotted his official duties. He run for the presidency of Iran in the 2013 elections, but withdrew his candidacy in May 2013. After the election of Hassan Rouhani as the president, his term ended as first vice president.

=== Corruption charges ===
Mohammad Reza Rahimi
- Status: Convicted
- Allegiance: Fatemi Circle
- Convictions: Illegal acquisition of illicit property and Bribe taking
- Criminal charges: Embezzlement; Illegal acquisition of illicit property Bribe taking Money laundering
- Penalty: 5 years and 91 days in prison Return of 8.5 billion Iranian Rials worth of goods Fined 10 billion Rials
- Capture status: In prison
- Accomplices: Jaber Abdali (alleged); Davoud Sarkhosh (convicted of bribing Rahimi)

Details
- Date apprehended: 15 February 2015; 11 years ago
- Imprisoned at: Evin Prison

Notes
- Further investigations on other charges is needed

Based on the claims of at least two members of the Iranian Parliament (Majlis), Rahimi was the head of a corruption band that became known as Fatemi Circle. This circle had an office in Fatemi street in Tehran. Naderan, a member of Majlis who is close to Ahmad Tavakkoli, has criticized the judicial system for not arresting him. Motahari, another member of Majlis, has asked Ahmadinejad to cooperate with judicial system on this issue and called the accusations serious.

In January 2015, Iran's judiciary announced that Rahimi has been sentenced to 5 years in prison and an equivalent of $1 million fine.

==== Indictment ====
On 1 September 2014, Rahimi was sentenced to a prison term and a cash fine, convicted of yet unknown charges. The sentence needs to be finalized by a Court of Appeal for details of the indictment to be revealed. On 21 January 2015, Iran's supreme court sentenced Rahimi to five years and 91 days in prison and fined him to pay 10 billion rials. Rahimi was also ordered to pay a compensation equivalent to 28.5 billion rials.

=== Statements on Jews and illegal drugs ===
At an international anti-drug conference held in Tehran with the United Nations Office on Drugs and Crime on 26 June 2012, Rahimi delivered an antisemitic speech, at which at least 10 Western diplomats were present, blaming the Talmud for the spread of illegal drugs worldwide. Rahimi stated that the Talmud teaches "how to destroy non-Jews so as to protect an embryo in the womb of a Jewish mother" and that "Zionists" are in control of the illegal drug trade. He stated his "proof" is that there is not "one single Zionist who is an addict." The New York Times, which covered the conference marking a U.N.-sponsored International Day against Drug Abuse and Illicit Trafficking, further quoted Rahimi as saying Zionists ordered gynaecologists to kill black babies and that the Russian Revolution of 1917 was started by Jews – although none, he was also quoted as saying, died in it. Rahimi's statements, which subsequently appeared on the official presidential website, were also broadcast by the Fars News Agency.

==== Responses ====
Rahimi's remarks drew sharp criticism from the international community.

Rabbi Abraham Cooper, associate dean of the Simon Wiesenthal Center, stated that "Here is yet another example of the fact that anti-Semitism is a pillar of the Mullahocracy in Tehran...on a day when nations are supposed to set aside their differences to combat illegal drugs, the Iranian government continues to malign the Jewish people and its religious traditions – all part of their ongoing campaign of demonizing the Jewish people and dehumanizing supporters of the Jewish state." Abe Foxman, the National Director of the Anti-Defamation League, stated that "To all those who thought that anti-Semitism is a thing of the past, certainly this makes it very clear that it is alive and well again. What makes it more sinister and dangerous is the fact that it comes from a leader of a country that has vowed to destroy the Jewish state and is making efforts to obtain the means to do it."

John Baird, Canada's Foreign Minister condemned the remarks, stating that "Iran's ongoing use of UN forums to harass Israel and insult Jewish people around the world is completely unacceptable. Canada hopes the international community joins us in speaking out against, and utterly rejecting, such ridiculous and anti-Semitic assertions."

The European Union's foreign policy chief Catherine Ashton, who leads nuclear talks with Iran on behalf of six world powers, released a statement, stating that she "is deeply disturbed by racist and anti-Semitic statements made by Iranian First Vice-President Mohammad Reza Rahimi. Such statements are unacceptable and should not be tolerated." Italian Foreign Minister Giulio Terzi also condemned Rahimi's remarks, calling them "Disturbing and absolutely unacceptable." Alistair Burt, the British foreign minister for the Middle East, stated that "We condemn utterly the baseless comments from Iran's vice president Rahimi about the Talmud and the Jewish faith, made at a United Nations drugs control event in Tehran this week. Racism and anti-semitism are unacceptable in any circumstance, let alone at an event sponsored by the United Nations. We call upon Iran to correct this scandalous statement, and to ensure that its officials respect the proper international norms and standards in the future."

Alun Jones, spokesman for the Vienna-based United Nations Office on Drugs and Crime, later stated that UNODC attended the Tehran conference as well as related events across the world on Tuesday, as mandated by the U.N. General Assembly, and that it could not anticipate what the Iranian hosts would say.

== Affiliation ==
Rahimi reportedly "professed" allegiance to Akbar Hashemi Rafsanjani when he served in his administration, despite the fact he later became his "outspoken foe".

Naghmeh Sohrabi, a professor at Brandeis University, classifies Rahimi among "new guard" conservatives which came to mainstream political arena in 2005. She names Mahmoud Ahmadinejad, Mojtaba Samareh Hashemi and Esfandiar Rahim Mashaei among the prominent figures of the faction. He was a member of the committee composed of 15 figures from different spectrum of conservative factions that planned establishment of the United Front of Principlists in 2008 elections. In November 2010, Rahimi was among 30 figures invited to a similar meeting of conservatives for 2012 parliamentary elections, although he did not attend.

== See also ==
- Hossein Samsami

Political offices
Preceded by Hassan Zohree	Governor of Kurdistan Province; 1993–1997	Succeeded by Abdollah Ramezanzadeh
Preceded by Majid Jafarzadeh	Vice President of Iran for Legal and Parliamentary Affairs; 2008–2009	Succeeded by Mohammad Reza Mirtajodini
Preceded by Esfandiar Rahim Mashaei	First Vice President of Iran; 2009–2013	Succeeded by Eshaq Jahangiri
