= 60th Anniversary Additional Commemorative Non-Aligned Meeting =

Non-Aligned Movement Summit

60th Anniversary Additional Commemorative Non-Aligned Meeting Додатни комеморативни сусрет Покрета несврстаних на 60. годишњицу оснивања / Dodatni komemorativni susret Pokreta nesvrstanih na 60. godišnjicu osnivanja (Serbian)

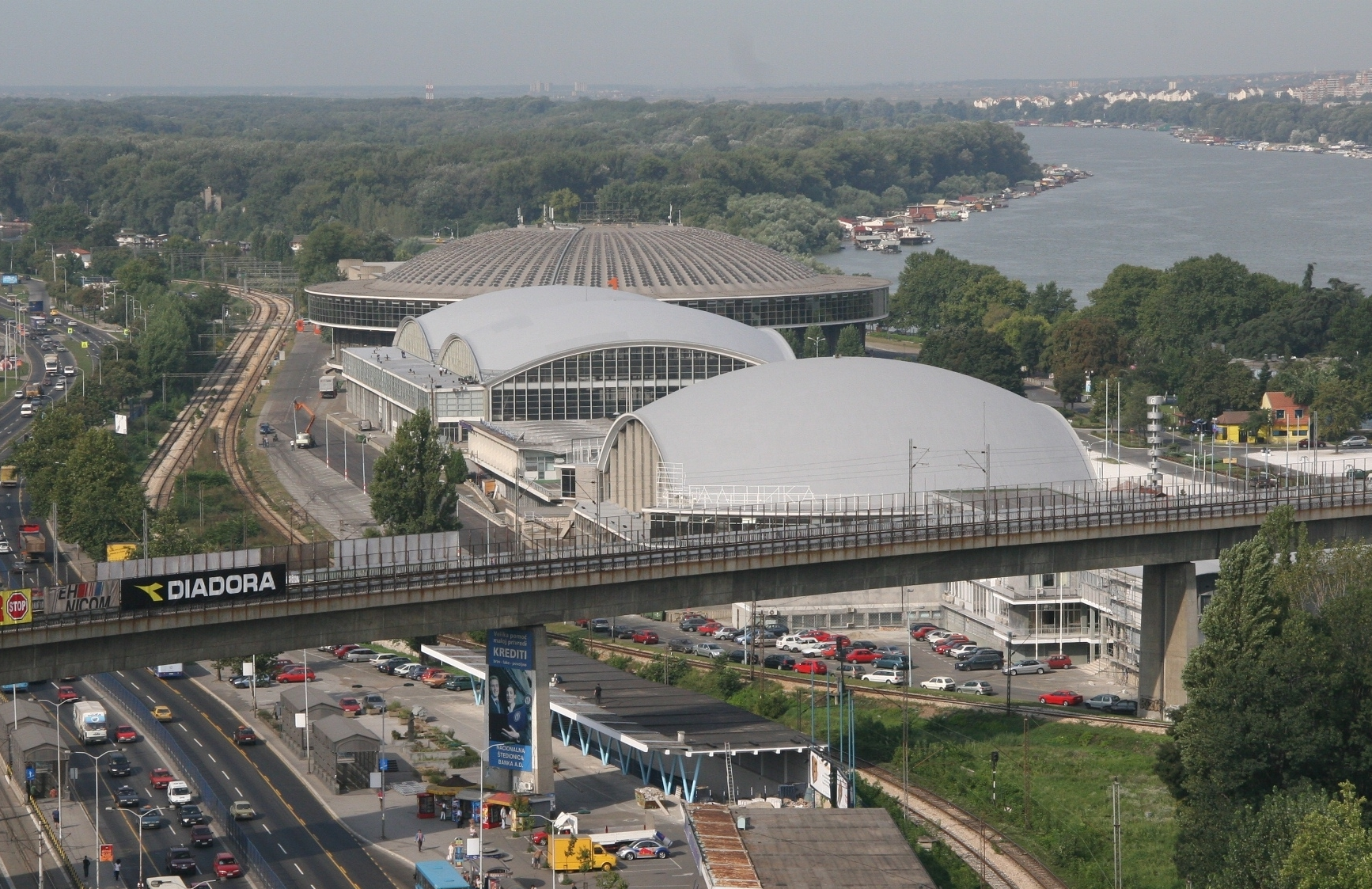
- the Belgrade Fair was selected as an adequately large event venue in the Covid pandemic context
- Host country: Serbia
- Date: October 11, 2021 – October 12, 2021
- Cities: Belgrade
- Venues: Belgrade Fair
- Chair: Aleksandar Vučić and Ilham Aliyev (President of Serbia and President of Azerbaijan)

The 60th Anniversary Additional Commemorative Non-Aligned Meeting was a Non-Aligned Movement commemorative meeting which took place on 11–12 October 2021 in Belgrade, Serbia. The meeting was organized by the Ministry of Foreign Affairs of Serbia, and cohosted with Azerbaijan, in commemoration of the 1st Summit of the Non-Aligned Movement. President Ilham Aliyev made the opening speech in a video format. Minister of Foreign Affairs of Serbia Nikola Selaković underlined that his county's strategic goal is membership in the European Union, but that Serbia would not give up on its traditional friends including Russia, China, and all other member states of the Non-Aligned Movement.

While reflecting on historical achievements, Indian representative Meenakshi Lekhi asked for 'honest introspection about [the] Movement ... due to the tendencies of some NAM members to deliberately take up divisive issues'. Participants criticized the developed countries for the disparity in vaccine access between developed and developing countries.

== Participants ==
The event took place at the Belgrade Fair with attendees including President of Ghana Nana Akufo-Addo, Abd al-Hakim (son of Gamal Abdel Nasser), and Minister of Foreign Affairs of Russia Sergey Lavrov as an observer. Secretary General of the United Nations António Guterres stressed that the event is taking place in the context of exceptional global challenges.

Cyprus, one of the founding members and one of three former European members, was notably absent, with Ministry of Foreign Affairs of Cyprus refusing to comment on Radio Free Europe and with media implying it was the result of Cyprus's poor relations with the co-host country of Azerbaijan.

Turkish Minister of Foreign Affairs Mevlüt Çavuşoğlu was invited as a special guest. Turkish diplomat Volkan Bozkır was previously president of the Seventy-fifth session of the United Nations General Assembly. Serbian Minister of Foreign Affairs Nikola Selaković described the event as the largest diplomatic gathering in Europe taking place during the COVID pandemic.

=== Delegates ===
==== Members ====
- Algeria; Aymen Benabderrahmane
- Angola; Tete António
- Antigua and Barbuda; Paul Chet Greene
- Azerbaijan; Jeyhun Bayramov
- Bangladesh; AK Abdul Momen
- Burkina Faso; Alpha Barry
- Cambodia; Ouch Borith
- Eritrea; Osman Saleh Mohammed
- Ghana; Nana Akufo-Addo
- Guyana; Joseph Hamilton
- India; Meenakshi Lekhi
- Indonesia; Retno Marsudi
- Iran; Mehdi Safari
- Iraq; Fuad Hussein
- Kuwait; Ahmad Nasser Al-Mohammad Al-Sabah
- Lebanon; Abdallah Bou Habib
- Morocco; Omar Hilale
- Nepal; Narayan Khadka
- Nicaragua; Denis Moncada Colindres
- Nigeria; Geoffrey Onyeama
- Palestine; Riyad al-Maliki
- Saint Kitts and Nevis; Mark Brantley
- Saudi Arabia; Faisal bin Farhan Al Saud
- Sudan; Mariam al-Mahdi
- Syria; Faisal Mekdad

==== Observers ====
- Bosnia and Herzegovina; Milorad Dodik
- Croatia; Zdenko Lucić
- Russia; Sergey Lavrov
- Serbia; host of the meeting with multiple official representatives involved.

==== Guests ====
- Slovenia; Stanislav Raščan
- Turkey; Mevlüt Çavuşoğlu

== Events and initiatives ==
The city of Belgrade extended the opening hours of various services (restricted due to pandemic) to welcome numerous foreign guests. The President of the Seventy-sixth session of the United Nations General Assembly hosted the Meeting of Women Heads of Delegations and Ministers of Foreign Affairs at the UN House in Belgrade. Minister of Foreign Affairs of Indonesia Retno Marsudi highlighted Indonesia's nomination of the Archive of the First NAM Conference to the Memory of the World program of UNESCO. Saint Kitts and Nevis and Burkina Faso established formal diplomatic relations and a visa waiver agreement at the meeting. During a meeting with Riyad al-Maliki, President of Serbia Vučić reiterated that his country would not move its embassy to Jerusalem, as it had planned in the 2020 Washington Agreement.

== Criticism ==
University of Graz professor Florian Bieber criticized the event, describing it as '[u]nified by nothing, containing a lot of autocrats and serving the [Aleksandar Vučić] policy agenda'. The President of Kosovo Vjosa Osmani said Belgrade was using the movement to distort perceptions about Kosovo and called Serbia a colonizer country. The head of the Serbian Government's Office for Kosovo Petar Petković countered, stating '[Osmani] is losing support internationally'.

== See also ==
- 50th Anniversary Additional Commemorative Non-Aligned Meeting
- Yugoslavia and the Non-Aligned Movement
- 1st Summit of the Non-Aligned Movement
- 9th Summit of the Non-Aligned Movement
- Museum of African Art, Belgrade
- Museum of Yugoslavia
- Archives of Yugoslavia
