= Abdolreza Rahmani Fazli =

Iranian politician

- عبدالرضا رحمانی فضلی
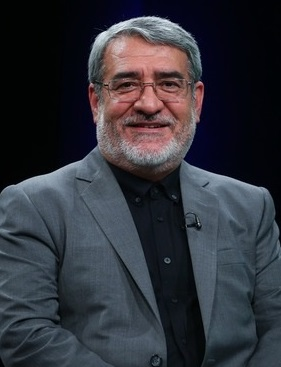
- Rahmani Fazli in 2020

Ambassador of Iran to China
- Incumbent
- Assumed office 21 May 2025
- President: Masoud Pezeshkian
- Preceded by: Mohsen Bakhtiyar

Minister of Interior
- In office 15 August 2013 – 25 August 2021
- President: Hassan Rouhani
- Preceded by: Mostafa Mohammad-Najjar
- Succeeded by: Ahmad Vahidi

President of the Supreme Audit Court
- In office 2 July 2008 – 15 August 2013
- Preceded by: Mohammad Reza Rahimi
- Succeeded by: Amin Hossein Rahimi

Member of the Parliament of Iran
- In office 28 May 1992 – 28 May 1996
- Constituency: Shirvan
- Majority: 57,947 (53.50%)

Personal details
- Born: 1959 (age 66–67) Shirvan, Pahlavi Iran
- Education: Ferdowsi University of Mashhad; Tarbiat Modares University
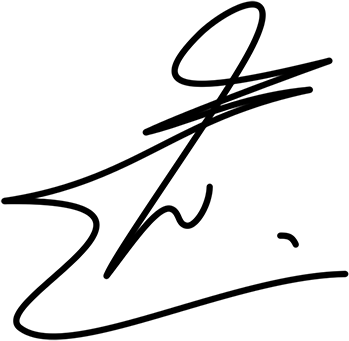
- Signature
- Website: Governmental website

Abdolreza Rahmani Fazli (Persian: عبدالرضا رحمانی فضلی; born 1959) is an Iranian conservative politician who has served as the ambassador of Iran to China in the Government of Masoud Pezeshkian since 21 May 2025. He was also Minister of Interior in Hassan Rouhani's government and the president of the Supreme Audit Court from 2008 to 2013.

== Early life and education ==
Fazli was born in Shirvan in 1959. He is a graduate of Ferdowsi University of Mashhad. He also received a PhD in geography from Tarbiat Modarres University.

== Career ==
Fazli served in different positions, including as the head of the planning department, member of parliament, deputy chairman of Iranian National TV and Radio, and deputy head of economic and international affairs at the Ministry of Interior. He was appointed secretary and deputy head of the Supreme National Security Council in October 2005. He was the deputy of Ali Larijani in charge of the cultural, social and media affairs during the first presidential term of Mahmoud Ahmedinejad. Fazli resigned from the post in November 2007 one month after the appointment of Saeed Jalili as the head of the council.

In July 2008, Fazli was appointed the president of the Supreme Audit Court. He was reappointed to the post in July 2012 for a further four years.

In late July 2013, the Mehr news agency reported that Fazli was the only candidate for interior minister at the cabinet of President Hassan Rouhani. Fazli was nominated by Rouhani for the post on 4 August. He was confirmed by the Parliament on 15 August, replacing Mostafa Mohammad-Najjar in the post. 256 votes were polled for Fazli and 19 against, while 9 members of the Parliament did not attend the session. On 24 August 2013, President Rouhani additionally appointed Fazli as Secretary General of Drug Control Headquarters.

=== As Iranian ambassador to China ===
Rahmani Fazli was appointed Iran's new ambassador to China in May 2025.

In an interview in November 2019, he referred to the civilian protesters, saying: "We shot them in both the head and the legs, not just the head. We also hit the legs!" 1,500 people were killed during two weeks of unrest across Iran. ·Iranian officials later admitted that they approved live fire against civilian protesters, at the order of Fazli.

=== Views and alliances ===
Fazli is a conservative politician and long-term associate of Ali Larijani, former parliament speaker.

== Sanctions ==
In May 2020, the United States Department of State sanctioned Fazli due to his alleged role in the 2019 Iranian protests and for committing human rights abuses against the Iranian people.

Political offices
Preceded by Mohammad-Reza Rahimi	President of the Supreme Audit Court; 2008–2013	Succeeded by Amin-Hossein Rahimi
Preceded by Mostafa Mohammad-Najjar	Minister of Interior; 2013–2021	Succeeded by Ahmad Vahidi
