= Companies of Pahlavi Iran =

Major Iranian Companies before the 1979 Islamic Revolution
- Flag of Iran (1964–1980)
- Type: Historical / Economic overview
- Industry: Manufacturing, Oil, Automotive, Insurance, Banking, Food, Transport, and more
- Founded: 1950s–1970s
- Headquarters: Iran

Under the Pahlavi dynasty, a number of prominent Iranian corporations arose in Iran, especially between the 1950s and 1970s. These companies were active in oil, automotive, insurance, banking, industrial manufacturing, consumer goods, transport, and other sectors. After the Iranian Revolution, many were nationalized, dissolved, or reorganized.

== Background ==
During the reign of Mohammad Reza Shah Pahlavi, Iran underwent rapid economic modernization through initiatives such as the White Revolution and land reforms. Foreign investments and domestic industrial strategies led to the growth of major national companies.

== List of companies ==
- Arj Co.: Founded in 1943. Once a pioneer in home appliances. Declined and closed. After the 1979 Islamic Revolution, it was confiscated, and due to the inefficiency of state management, on June 13, 2016, the Arj warehouse was officially shut down with a judicial seal after 79 years.
- Azmayesh Co.: Appliance producer. Nationalized, partially privatized later.On May 13, 2018, according to the announcement published in the Official Gazette, the factory’s authorities decided to dissolve the company.
- Bank Melli Iran: Established in 1928. It remains the largest state-owned bank.
- Behshahr Industrial Group: Producer of food and hygiene products. Later merged into state holdings.
- Bimeh Iran (Iran Insurance): Founded in 1935 as the first Iranian insurance company. Still state-owned.
- Chin Chin Co.: Beverage producer. Nationalized, later privatized.
- Haft-Tappeh Sugarcane Complex: Founded in 1961. Still operational but faced strikes and ownership changes.
- Imperial Social Services Organization: A welfare group supported by the royal family. Dissolved after the revolution.
- Iran National (Iran Khodro): Founded in 1962 by Mahmoud and Ahmad Khayami. Famous for the Peykan car. Now known as Iran Khodro.
- Iranian State Railways: Originally built under Reza Shah, expanded during the 1950s–1970s. Continues today under state control.
- Kafsh-e Melli (National Shoe Company): Founded in 1947. Once a major shoe brand in Iran. Nationalized post-revolution and later declined.
- Minoo Industrial Group: A food producer founded in 1958. Nationalized after 1979.
- National Iranian Oil Company (NIOC): Founded in 1951. Remains the backbone of Iran’s oil industry and is state-controlled.
- Pars Khodro (Iran Kaveh): Vehicle manufacturer. Later integrated into Iran Khodro.
- Tabriz Shoe Company: Active before the revolution. Production decreased afterward.
- Tehran Cement Co.: One of Iran’s largest cement firms. Remains operational.
- Blair Co.: Appliance company. Operations ceased post-1979.
- Pars TV Co.: Produced audio-visual devices. Dissolved post-revolution.
- One & One Co.: Electronics brand. Closed after 1979.
- Pars Electric Co.: Producer of electronics. Nationalized and then privatized.
- PARS Chocolate (Minoo): A confectionery branch of Minoo Group. Government-owned.
- Tehran Plasco Co.: Plastic products firm. Nationalized, later privatized.

== Post-revolution outcomes ==
After the Iranian Revolution, most of Iran’s major industries and corporations were either nationalized, dissolved, or absorbed into state-run enterprises. A few, such as Iran Khodro or Bank Melli, continued under new names or reorganized structures. Others like Arj or Kafsh Melli declined due to economic or managerial challenges.
