= Mostafa Mohammad-Najjar =

Iranian politician

Sardar Mostafa Mohammad-Najjar
- مصطفى محمدنجّار
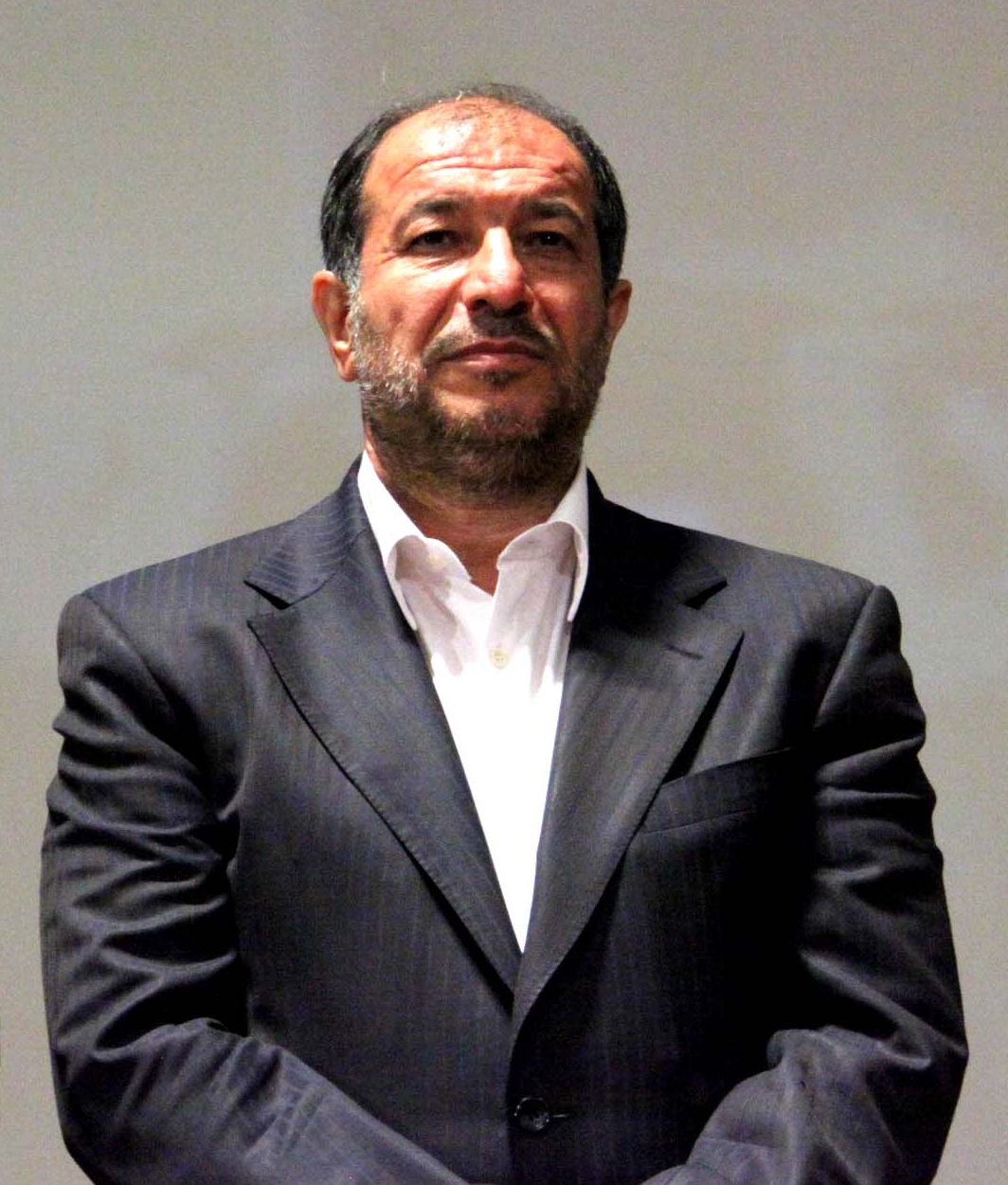

Minister of Interior
- In office 3 September 2009 – 15 August 2013
- President: Mahmoud Ahmadinejad
- Preceded by: Sadegh Mahsouli
- Succeeded by: Abdolreza Rahmani

Minister of Defence and Armed Forces Logistics
- In office 24 August 2005 – 3 September 2009
- President: Mahmoud Ahmadinejad
- Preceded by: Ali Shamkhani
- Succeeded by: Ahmad Vahidi

Personal details
- Born: 2 December 1956 (age 69) Tehran, Iran

Military service
- Allegiance: Iran
- Branch/service: Revolutionary Committee; Revolutionary Guards
- Years of service: 1979–2005
- Rank: Brigadier General
- Battles/wars: 1979 Kurdish Rebellion; Iran–Iraq War

Mostafa Mohammad Najjar (Persian: مصطفى محمدنجّار, born 2 December 1956) is an Iranian politician and retired IRGC general. He was interior minister of Iran from 2009 to 2013 and Minister of Defence and Armed Forces Logistics in the first cabinet of Mahmoud Ahmadinejad from 2005 to 2009. He is also a veteran of the IRGC.

== Early life ==
Najjar was born on 2 December 1956 in Tehran, ethnicity Azerbaijani, from Bostanabad. He graduated from K. N. Toosi University of Technology in 1977 and holds a BSc in Mechanical Engineering from Khajeh Nasir Toosi University of Technology (1984) and a master's degree in strategic management from the University of Industrial Management (2004).

== Military career ==
Najjar joined the Islamic Revolutionary Guard Corps (IRGC) when the body was established in 1979, where he was in charge of the Middle East Department, with Israel, Lebanon and the Persian Gulf as places of particular attention. As an IRGC commander, he served in Lebanon.

Previous positions include:

- Staff Officer in the IRGC Central Command HQ responsible for the affairs of Sistan and Baluchestan Province.
- IRGC's Director of Cooperatives in 1981.
- Acting Commander of the Weaponry Support Unit of the Ministry for IRGC Affairs and responsible for equipment and industrial technical assistance in Hadid industries.
- Deputy Head of the Armament Section of the Military Industries Organization (MIO) from 1986 to 2007.
- Head of the operational council of the arms industry group in the defense industries organization.
- Head of the MIO's Munitions Section.

He was also active for military service in Kurdistan from 1980 to 1985 in the Iran–Iraq War and was appointed head of Saad by Yahya Rahim Safavi in 1995.

== Political career ==
Najjar was posted to the Parliament and ministry of defense by Mahmoud Ahmadinejad in August 2005. He received 191 to 62 of votes and became minister on 9 August 2005. He was minister until August 2009, when Ahmadinejad was reelected and appointed Mohammad-Najjar as minister of interior. He received 178 to 72 of votes and became minister to succeed Sadegh Mahsouli.

== Activities and views ==
During his tenure as minister of defense, Najjar frequently attacked the West's nuclear abilities and fiercely defended Iran's right to advance its peaceful nuclear energy program. According to his military philosophy, missile capabilities play an important role in the defense of Iran and in its overall military abilities. Najjar believes that "they serve the interests of stability and peace in the region" and are an integral part "…of the power of defense of the Islamic world."

According to Najjar (October 2007), "Iranian missiles are not a threat to any country, and they will only fall on the heads of those who attack Iranian territory." In response to the test of the long-range surface-to-surface Sajil missile, Najjar said it was designed "…for deterrence and to safeguard the stability of the region." Throughout his tenure, Najjar has focused on Iran's military-technological independence and on ensuring the country would not be dependent on the supply of weapons systems from other countries. This was emphasized in his statement upon handing over the reigns of his position to his successor (September 2009):

As a soldier, I am happy to move to a new front to serve my country, but on the other hand, it is hard for me to leave after 30 years of service in the Ministry of Defense... I am happy to leave the Ministry of Defense with the armed forces at the peak of their strength and abilities. Imam Khomeini had a divine calling, namely to accomplish something tremendous in the world by establishing an Islamic regime based on Wali Fakih (guardianship of Islamic jurists). The Islamic regime in Iran offers a new and different example for the world in all areas, particularly with respect to defense and the military. Thanks to the Islamic regime, we have reached a point where our scientists alone produce everything our armed forces require. Today, the entire world, from east to west, is astounded by Iran's many achievements. We have been so successful and racked up many achievements to our credit on land, sea and air, submarines and space, and particularly in the field of space. I am leaving the Ministry of Defense, when we no longer need foreigners, and we are even able to export some of our achievements.

After assuming the position of interior minister, Najjar gathered all the employees of the ministry, sharing both his worldview and the main tasks of the Ministry:

Relating to and being attentive to the tradition, mentality and customs of Iranian Islamic society, ensuring security and calm for the entire public and generating national unity... The family is based on the fundamentals of fondness and love, and one of the challenges of Western societies today is extreme individualism, pursuit of pleasure and lack of interest in the rest of humanity and family members. All of this has led to the disintegration of the family unit in the West. Today, the amount of time spent with the family has decreased, and this is the reason for the rise in the number of social calamities. The government will strive to increase its attention to social issues as well... Today, there is no danger of military attack, and the global imperialist regime is trying to develop a uniform global culture plan, to the detriment of the cultural identity of other societies. The true risk is that society will forget and lose its cultural identity, and it is our obligation to do our utmost to protect society's Islamic and Iranian identity.

During his term, there were increasingly harsh punishments for dress code violations and morals. The enforcement of the dress code gained significant momentum and dedicated mechanisms and organizations were established to promote enforcement along with measures "…to strengthen the Islamic faith." Throughout his term, he has taken a hard line when it comes to suppressing protests and the opposition in Iran, referring to them as fitna, and saying that they were acting against the best interests of the Iranian people. In the middle of July 2010 demonstrations, he called in Iran's Law Enforcement Forces (LEF), warning against a "Velvet Revolution" and "imperialist plots."

Najjar warned against activity on social networks and satellite channels: "The West is taking advantage of electronic systems and the virtual world to undermine the security of our society and break down the family unit in Iran. This is a matter which must be thoroughly investigated." There has been an increase in Iran of monitoring of the Internet, arrests of bloggers and blocking of e-mail accounts.

At the same time, Najjar responded to the increased activity of the Sunni opposition (Jundallah) with a security clampdown on Iran's eastern borders. During his tenure, Najjar had to grapple with the assassination of Iranian nuclear scientists and said (July 2011) that "this issue is our top priority" and that his Ministry had implemented a special program to guard nuclear scientists."

The tough and violent approach taken by Najjar during the repression of the protests after the 2009 elections put him and other senior Iranian officials on the U.S. designation for serious human rights abuses involving Iran. The Fact Sheet issued by the U.S. Department of the Treasury stated the following about Najjar:

Mostafa Mohammad Najjar was appointed the Deputy Commander-in-Chief of Armed Forces in charge of Police Forces in order to "ensure order and security" in November 2009. He was in charge of the government response to protests on Ashura, one of the holiest days in Shia Islam, which in 2009 coincided with 27 December 2009. State media reported 37 dead and hundreds arrested. He is currently the Minister of Interior and, as such, has authority over all police forces, Interior Ministry security agents, and plainclothes agents.

Political offices
Preceded by Ali Shamkhani	Minister of Defense; 2005–2009	Succeeded by Ahmad Vahidi
Preceded by Sadegh Mahsouli	Minister of Interior; 2009–2013	Succeeded by Abdolreza Rahmani
