= Mahafarid Amir Khosravi =

Iranian businessman

- مه‌آفريد اميرخسروى
- Born: c. 1969; Rudbar, Gilan, Iran
- Died: 24 May 2014; Evin Prison, Tehran, Iran
- Other name: Amir Mansour Aria
- Organization: Aria Investment Development Company
- Known for: 2011 Iranian embezzlement scandal
- Criminal charges: Embezzlement, money laundering, bribery
- Criminal penalty: Death
- Criminal status: Executed by hanging
- Spouse: Sara Khosravi

Mahafarid Amir Khosravi (Persian: مه‌آفرید امیرخسروی) (c. 1969 – 24 May 2014), also known as Amir Mansour Aria (Persian: امیرمنصور آریا), was an Iranian businessman who was executed for his part in the 2011 Iranian embezzlement scandal. At one time, he was considered the richest man in Iran. An assessment made in April 2012 suggested he would rank as 290th among Forbes' richest people in the world if included on the list.

== Biography ==
Khosravi graduated from high school and was accepted at Islamic Azad University of Zanjan for civil engineering, but was dismissed after six semesters with a GPA of 6.23. Khosravi finished his Iranian military service in 1993.

He and his brother were running a cattle ranch when Khosravi began getting loans for its facilities during 2005–2006. At that time, he started a privately held company called Aria Investment Development Company with his family. Khosravi widened his relations with banks and, in 2010, requested to start his own bank, which was founded in the same year. According to Mohammad Reza Khabbaz, a member of the Iranian Parliament, Khosravi was supported by some government officials and used this influence to buy large stocks of many companies and hectares of land at prices well below the market value.

By 2011, Khosravi's business holdings included more than 35 companies engaging in diverse business segments including mineral water, meat importation, and a football club. His net worth exceeded US$1 billion. In 2011, an investigation into fraudulent loans at Bank Saderat, one of Iran's top banks, was launched. It was determined that Khosravi was the mastermind of a scheme that generated US$2.6 billion of loans with forged documents, dating back to 2007. Under the scheme, bank managers were bribed by Aria Investment Development Company to accept the forged documents. The loans were then used to purchase state-owned businesses, effectively privatizing the companies using state funds since the loans would not be repaid. According to the investigation, Khosravi's company was worth 50 million tomans in June 2006, and had reached a value of 20 billion tomans by February 2009 due primarily to the loans transactions.

Khosravi was charged with being "corrupt on earth", a charge that would make him an enemy of God and carry the death penalty. At his trial, he admitted to bribing Mahmoud Reza Khavari, the former head of Bank Melli, and others with more than US$3 million. A total of 39 people were convicted in what was the largest fraud case since the 1979 Iranian Revolution. In the investigation, it was alleged that President Mahmoud Ahmadinejad was an ally of Khosravi. Ahmadinejad was questioned on his involvement with the embezzlement scheme, but no connection was proven.

Khosravi was executed by hanging in Evin Prison in Tehran on 24 May 2014. An appeal to stop the death sentence being carried out was dismissed by Iran's Supreme Court in the week prior to the execution. After his death, his wife, Sara Khosravi, said that she was informed about the death of her husband through the news and did not believe it until their lawyer could see the body and confirm the death. She said that in their last meeting, the day before the execution, Mahafarid had been in good condition and was still hoping for a change to his death sentence.
