= Mehdi Safari =

Iranian diplomat

- مهدی صفر
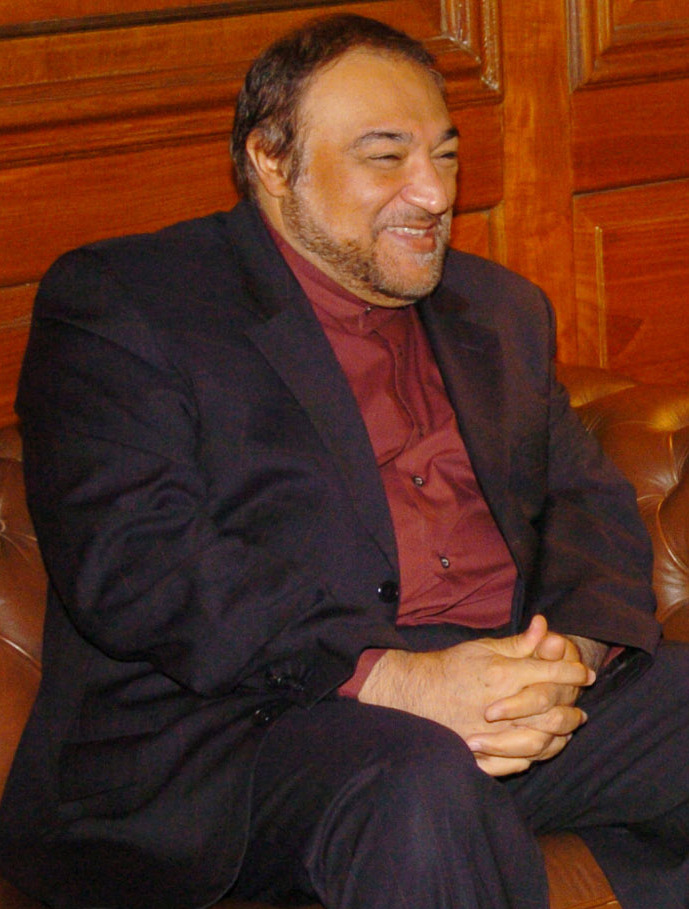

Iranian Ambassador to China
- In office 2010–2014
- President: Mahmoud Ahmadinejad Hassan Rouhani

ambassador of Iran to Russia
- In office 1994–2001
- President: Akbar Hashemi Rafsanjani Mohammad Khatami
- Succeeded by: Gholamreza Shafeei

ambassador of Iran to Austria
- In office 1991–1994
- President: Akbar Hashemi Rafsanjani

Personal details
- Born: 1951 (age 74–75)
- Awards: Order of Service (Third Order)

Mehdi Safari (Persian: مهدی صفری, born 1951) is an Iranian diplomat.

From 1991 to 1994, he served as an Iranian ambassador to Austria. Next, from 1994 to 2001, he was an ambassador to Russia. In 1997, he was awarded the Order of Service. Safari was also chargé d'affaires of the Embassy of Iran in Germany. In 2009, he was nominated ambassador to the United Kingdom, but the decision was dismissed before he took over the office.

He was an ambassador to China from 2010 to 2014. He also served as the Deputy Foreign Minister for Asia-Pacific Affairs, Deputy Foreign Minister for European and American Affairs, and Deputy Governor of the city of Bushehr. In 2021, he was Iran's delegate to the 60th Anniversary Additional Commemorative Non-Aligned Meeting.
