= Jaber Ebdali =

Iranian businessman and white-collar criminal

- Born: c. 1975 (age 50–51); Khoy, West Azarbaijan Province
- Other name: "Mr. Special"
- Status: Convicted
- Allegiance: Fatemi Circle
- Convictions: Embezzlement and forgery
- Penalty: 15 years in prison Return of 18.5 billion Rials; Fined 37.5 billion Rials
- Capture status: In prison
- Accomplice: Mohammad Reza Rahimi

Details
- Date apprehended: c. 2009; 17 years ago

Jaber Ebdali (Persian: جابر ابدالی) is an Iranian businessman and white-collar criminal. His name became publicly known in April 2010, when MP Elyas Naderan wrote an open letter to Mohammad Reza Rahimi and named him as a member of "Fatemi Circle".

== Iran insurance embezzlement ==
A key member of "Fatemi Circle", he was convicted of embezzlement and forgery in "Iran Insurance" and is now in prison.

== 170 Majlis candidates controversy ==
In 2015, in an open letter to Mahmoud Ahmadinejad, Mohammad Reza Rahimi claimed that during Iranian legislative election, 2008, Ebdali has paid money to 170 candidates. Immediately, 30 MPs called for the list to be publicized; however, the request was withdrawn shortly afterwards. According to Islamic Republic News Agency, Majlis Speaker Ali Larijani has forwarded the list of 170 MPs to Iranian Judiciary. The amount of money is reported to be about 12,000,000,000 Rials.
