= List of ambassadors of Iran to China =

Coordinates: 39.946086°N 116.456636°E

Ambassador of Iran to China
- Incumbent; Abdolreza Rahmani Fazli since May 21, 2025
- Inaugural holder: Abbas Aram
- Formation: 1972

The Iranian ambassador in Beijing is the official representative of the Government in Tehran to the Government of China.

- Till August 16, 1971 the Iranian ambassador to Japan was accredited in Taipei.

== List of representatives ==
Diplomatic agrément/Diplomatic accreditation	ambassador	Observations	Head of State of Iran	Premier of the People's Republic of China	Term end
	Hossein Xakahai Gooda	Hosayn Qods Naka'i Mr. Wu Nan- ju was appointed Chinese Ambassador to Iran and the Iranian Government, on its part, appointed Mr. Hossein Xakahai Gooda, Iranian Ambassador to Japan, to be concurrently Iranian Ambassador to China.	Mohammad Reza Pahlavi	Chen Cheng	
February 27, 1966	Hormoz Gharib	Hormoz Qarib (*1916): October 21, 1957 – 1963 ambassador Bern, 1964 – 1968 ambassador in Tokyo with concurrent accreditation to Taiwan.; 1970: chief of protocol	Mohammad Reza Pahlavi	Yen Chia-kan	
May 4, 1969	Noureddin Kia	Nur-al-Din Kia, Iranian ambassador to China Japan: Noureddine Kia, Tokyo (A) (also accredited to Republic of China).	Mohammad Reza Pahlavi	Yen Chia-kan	May 11, 1969
August 16, 1971		Mohammad Reza Pahlavi established diplomatic relations with the government in Beijing.	Mohammad Reza Pahlavi	Zhou Enlai	
1972	Abbas Aram		Mohammad Reza Pahlavi	Zhou Enlai	1975
1975	Ahmad Ali Bahrami		Mohammad Reza Pahlavi	Zhou Enlai	1976
1976	Mahmud Esfandiari		Mohammad Reza Pahlavi	Hua Guofeng	1980
1980	Taghi Farahi		Abulhassan Banisadr	Zhao Ziyang	1981
1982	Ali Khoram	'Ali Khorram	Ali Khamenei	Zhao Ziyang	1986
1987	Alaeddin Boroujerdi	Ala ed-Din Borujerdi	Ali Khamenei	Li Peng	1991
October 1990	Mohammad Hosein Taromi-Rad		Akbar Hashemi Rafsanjani	Li Peng	October 27, 1993
1994	Hossein Mirfakhkhar	Amir Hossein Mirfakhraie	Akbar Hashemi Rafsanjani	Li Peng	1995
December 1997	Mohammad Hossein Malaek	1979 Occupant of the Iran hostage crisis.; 1988 Ambassador in Bern.	Mohammad Khatami	Li Peng	November 8, 2001
November 8, 2001	Fereydoun Verdinejad	director of the Islamic Republic News Agency.	Mohammad Khatami	Wen Jiabao	March 18, 2005
2007	Javad Mansouri		Mahmoud Ahmadinejad	Wen Jiabao	2008
July 30, 2010	Mehdi Safari	1993-1999 Iranian ambassador to Russia	Mahmoud Ahmadinejad	Wen Jiabao	2014
September 2, 2014	Ali Asghar Khaji		Hassan Rouhani	Li Keqiang	2018
June 25, 2018	Abdolnaser Hemmati		Hassan Rouhani	Li Keqiang	July 25, 2018
December 8, 2018/December 26, 2018	Mohammad Keshavarz-Zadeh		Hassan Rouhani	Li Keqiang	June 21, 2023
June 21, 2023	Mohsen Bakhtiar		Ebrahim Raisi	Li Qiang	May 21,2025
May 21,2025	Abdolreza Rahmani Fazli		Masoud Pezeshkian	Li Qiang	Incumbent
