= 650 Fifth Avenue =

Office skyscraper in Manhattan, New York

Coordinates: 40.759942°N 73.976929°W

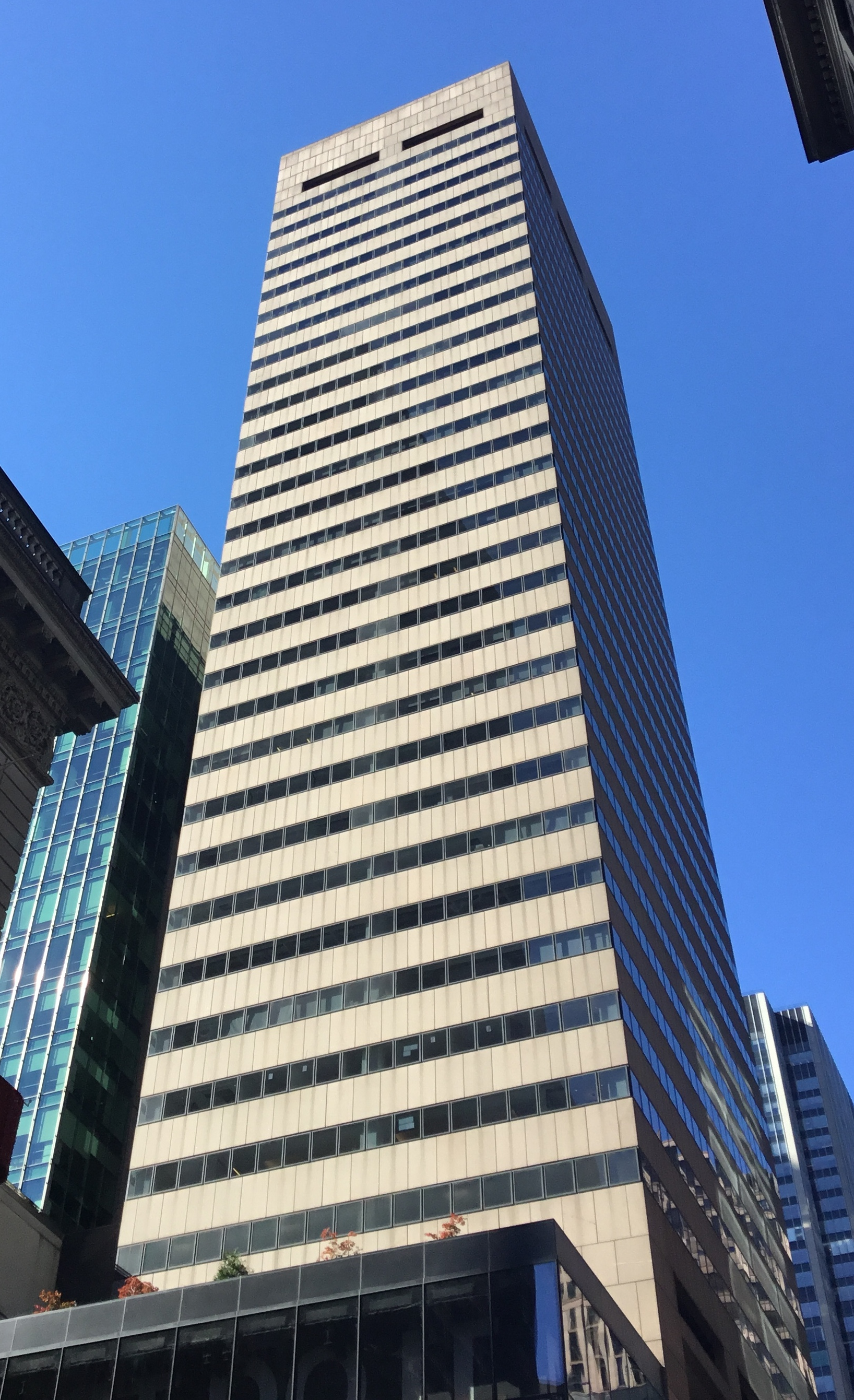
- Interactive map of 650 Fifth Avenue

General information
- Status: Completed
- Location: 650 Fifth Avenue
- Height: 490 feet (150 m)

Technical details
- Floor count: 36

650 Fifth Avenue (formerly known as the Piaget Building and the Pahlavi Foundation Building) is a 36-story 150 m (490 ft) building at Fifth Avenue and 52nd Street in Midtown Manhattan, New York City.

The building was designed by John Carl Warnecke & Associates for the Pahlavi Foundation, an organization run by the then-Shah of Iran, Mohammad Reza Pahlavi, "to pursue Iran's charitable interests in the U.S.". After the Iranian revolution in 1979, the Islamic Republic of Iran sought to take control of the Shah's property, including the assets of the Pahlavi Foundation, which was renamed the Alavi Foundation.

Tenants who leased space at 650 Fifth Avenue included Ivan F. Boesky, the infamous "greed-is-good" Wall Street speculator who was convicted of insider trading in 1987, and Marc Rich, a billionaire oil trader whose invention of the spot oil market made his fortune and changed the world economy.

The Alavi Foundation itself has its headquarters in Suite 2406.

== Iranian ownership ==
In December 2008, the Asset Forfeiture Unit and Terrorism and National Security Unit of the United States Attorney's Office for the Southern District of New York sought to seize 40 percent ownership in the building after it charged that Bank Melli of Iran owns that percentage of the building in violation of the sanctions against Iran. The other 60 percent of the building is owned by the Alavi Foundation—the Bonyad that is successor to the Pahlavi Foundation.

Bank Melli had originally financed it with a $42 million loan in 1978.

According to the U.S. government, the Alavi Foundation transferred 35 percent interest in the building to a shell company Assa Company Limited, which had just one employee, in exchange for Bank Melli officially cancelling the loan. However, the shell company officially registered in Jersey, was reported to be owned by Bank Melli.

In 2012, the owners hired CBRE Group to overhaul the building and lease space and give the appearance that Iran no longer had ties to the building. The new group spent $11 million renovating the building lobby and elevators.

In September 2013, United States District Court for the Southern District of New York Judge Katherine B. Forrest ruled "based on the uncontroverted record evidence, Assa was (and is) a front for [Iran's first national bank] Bank Melli, and thus a front for the government of Iran" and thus Alavi should forfeit for the property. Alavi indicated it would appeal the decision. SL Green bought the retail space that year. In June 2017, acting U.S. Attorney Joon H. Kim said the United States was prepared to seize the skyscraper—worth between $500 million to $1 billion—after a jury found that the Iranian sanctions had indeed been breached. In 2019, the jury verdict to seize the property was overturned by a federal appeals court.

== See also ==
- Vanderbilt Triple Palace, formerly on the site
