= Shahram Jazayeri =

Iranian businessman

- Born: Shahram Jazaery Arab; 11 September 1972 (age 53); Tehran, Iran
- Occupation: Businessman
- Website: shahramjazayeri.com

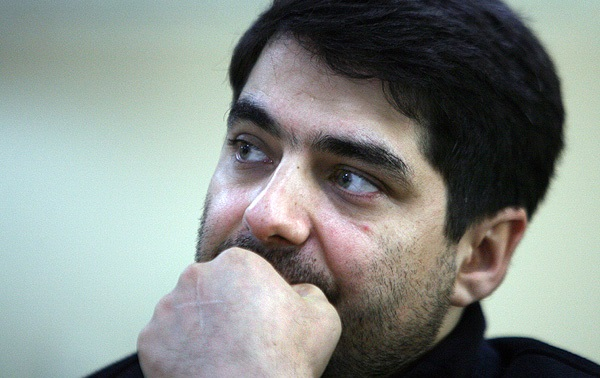
Shahram Jazayeri at District court (2 January 2007)

Shahram Jazayeri Arab (Persian: شهرام جزایری عرب) is an Iranian oligarch who was involved in a high-profile corruption case.

== Early life and education ==
He started the business by selling ice cream in his youth. Jazayeri was a student of dentistry in Kerman.

== Career ==
Jazayeri "accrued unimaginable riches during a short time in the 2000s through corruption and connections with influential officials." He owned some 500 import-export companies and made through use of shell corporations, making monitoring of his activities difficult; while he made connections in the Parliament of Iran at the same time, where he was presented as an economic expert in some hearings.

== Trial and imprisonment ==
Jazayeri was arrested in 2001 while boarding a commercial flight to the United Arab Emirates, when he was initially prosecuted for influence peddling and providing fake passport for an Afghan citizen. Charges against him included: bribery totaling 38 billion rials ($4.75 million), fraud to obtain loans amounting to 811 billion rials ($101 million), and setting up bogus companies. On 18 November 2002, Jazayeri was sentenced to 27 years of imprisonment. In September 2004, the supreme court partially overturned the conviction and sent back his case to the lower court awaiting trial. The court of appeal in 2008, reduced his sentence to 14 years and ruled that he must pay $145 million to the Iranian government, including $48 million owed to the state-owned Bank Melli Iran.

In 2007, an Iranian newspaper reported that, unlike ordinary prisoners in Iran, Jazayeri had access to a laptop and two mobile phones, and is living in luxury in prison, continuing his business activities overseas.

== Escape from prison ==
Jazayeri escaped from guards during a transfer on 20 February 2007, and reportedly fled the country afterwards. He was arrested by Ministry of Intelligence on 18 March 2007, in "one of the countries on the Persian Gulf". Iranian media reported that four senior officials in the judicial system were fired for his escape.

== Release from prison and later arrests ==
He was released on 3 October 2014. Jazayeri was detained again in Mashhad on 6 August 2016, charged with "disturbing public peace." On 29 July 2018, he was once again arrested while hidden in a consignment of lentils in an attempt to illegally cross the Bazargan border. A prosecutor said he may face a "relatively long-term imprisonment" in January 2019.

== Scam in Prison ==
Shahram Jazayeri started to selling crypto scam token with name of Power Cash in Tehran Bozorg Prison. he is also released shahrambank coin and shahramcoin.
