= Mahmoud Reza Khavari =

Iranian former banker (born 1952)

- Born: Mahmoud Reza Khavari; May 26, 1952 (age 74); Khorramabad, Lorestan, Pahlavi Iran
- Citizenship: Iran and Canada
- Education: University of Tehran; Shahid Beheshti University
- Occupations: Banker, businessman, alleged embezzler
- Known for: Involvement in the 2011 Iranian embezzlement scandal
- Children: Ardavan (Ardy) Khavari, Ardavan Khavari, Parandis Khavari, Khashayar Khavari
- Criminal charges: Embezzlement; Fraud; Bribe taking Illegal acquisition of illicit property
- Capture status: At large
- Wanted by: Iran; Interpol
- Wanted since: 2012
- Escaped: 2011

Mahmoud Reza Khavari (Persian: محمودرضا خاوری; born May 26, 1952) is an Iranian former banker, businessman, and fugitive alleged embezzler who was involved in the 2011 Iranian embezzlement scandal. He is a fugitive from the judicial authorities of Islamic Republic of Iran, and as of October 2016, he was the subject of an Interpol red notice issued on behalf of Iran.

He was the chairman of Bank Melli Iran until September 2011 and was chairman of Bank Sepah’s board of directors from December 2003 until March 2005.

He became a Canadian citizen in 2005, and he fled to Canada in 2011 to escape prosecution in Iran. Since then, he has been living in Canada, where he has not been charged with any crimes.

== Early life and education ==
Mahmoud Reza Khavari was born in the city of Khorramabad in western Iran. He obtained a bachelor of law degree from the University of Tehran and a master's degree from Shahid Beheshti University. Mahmoud Khavari has two sons named Ardavan Khavari and Khashayar Khavari. Ardavan Khavari is also known as Ardy Khavari. Khashayar Khavari also is known as Khash Khavari. Khavari also has one daughter named Parandis Khavari.

== Career ==
After graduation Khavari was hired by the Bank of Industry and Mine (Sanat-o-Madan) as the head of its complaints department. He was then selected to the board of directors of Sepah Bank in Rafsanjani's government and became the head of Sepah Bank during Khatami's presidency. In 2010, he was appointed by Mahmoud Ahmadinejad's government as the chairman of the board and managing director of Bank Melli Iran, the largest bank in Iran.

During his inauguration, Shamseddin Hosseini, minister of economic affairs and finance in Ahmadinejad's government, described Khavari as a "wise and pious man" and told the reporters that the highest level of scrutiny was employed in his appointment.

Khavari had not obtained a PhD but has often referred to himself as Dr. Khavari in official Bank Melli Iran communications.

== 2011 Iranian embezzlement scandal ==
In 2011, Khavari resigned from his position at Bank Melli amid allegations of being involved in the $2.6 billion Iranian embezzlement scandal. The scandal involved using forged documents to fraudulently buy privatized state assets that included major state-owned companies; Bank Melli, which Khavari led as its chairman of the board and managing director, was accused of facilitating the fraudulent payments. Khavari shortly after flew to the United Kingdom in order to attend a meeting at Lloyds Bank and announced his resignation via a fax to Iranian officials.

In his resignation letter, Khavari implicated another bank as the source of the fraud and claimed that he was resigning in order "to respect public opinion", according to Bloomberg.

At the end of September 2011, he fled to Canada, where he has held dual-citizenship since 2005. Toronto property records under Khavari's name date to 2001, when he took out a mortgage for a $615,000 property in North York. At one time, Khavari owned a Toronto-based company called Soaring Properties. In an attempt to protect his assets from being seized, Khavari invested in Toronto real estate by loaning money to his sons, Khashayar and Ardavan. He also signed his $3 million house in Bridle Path, Toronto, over to his daughter, Parandis Khavari, and transferred his other two houses to Mrs. Khavari. Despite numerous requests from Iranian police, Canadian authorities did not extradite Khavari. He may face the death penalty if convicted by the judicial system of Iran.

On October 31, 2011, Canadian MP Irwin Cotler called for an investigation on how Khavari acquired his Canadian citizenship.

In 2016, Bloomberg reported that Khavari and his sons have been active in the Toronto real estate market even after the scandal, and from 2012 to 2016, the family has purchased at least $12.1 million worth of properties under various names and legal entities. Additionally, they are also responsible for roughly $11 million from 10 different mortgages.

Many of the companies and institutions that Khavari has been associated with, such as Bank Sepah and Bank Melli have been sanctioned by the UN Security Council and the international community since 2007. The Security Council blacklisted Bank Sepah under Resolution 1747 and placed restrictions on Bank Melli under Resolution 1803. Avi Jorisch, a former U.S. Treasury official, expressed his opinion in the Jerusalem Post that Khavari was likely to be in violation of the Special Economic Measures (Iran) Regulations for having worked and provided financial services on behalf of a designated Canadian entity. Jorisch also said that Khavari may be in violation of Canada's Anti-Terrorism Act, along with Part II.1 of the Criminal Code (Section 83.05), and that under Section 83.05, Canadian authorities might have the right to freeze Khavari's assets. However, as of 2016, Khavari had not been subjected to any asset freeze or investigation by the Canadian authorities.

== Whereabouts ==
The New York Times reported in July 2012 that Canada had chosen not to extradite him to Iran, since the two countries do not have a bilateral extradition agreement in place.

In February 2014, Iran's Fars News Agency reported that the head of the Interpol Office of the Iranian Police said "a few days ago, the Canadian Interpol Office claimed in a phone contact that he has escaped to a Latin American or Caribbean country but that they couldn't verify the escape yet, and this is the latest piece of information provided by the Canadian Police to us". The Iranian police dismissed the report of his departure from Canada. In March 2015, Iran's Tasnim News Agency reported that the same official said that Khavari's location in Canada had been identified and that Canadian authorities were referring his case to the Canadian judiciary.

== Published works ==
- The Book of Banking Law Consisting of Legal and Legitimate Analysis of Banking Operations and Transactions (book) published by the Banking Training Center (Iran).
- "Committed Crimes on Aircraft and Hijacking" (essay)
- "Press Crimes" (article)
- Investigation into the Cause of Suspension of Punishment in Iran and EU Countries Laws (whitepaper)

== See also ==
- Mahafarid Amir Khosravi, a businessman executed in Iran for involvement in the embezzlement scandal
