= Supreme Audit Court of Iran =

Continuation-based organization in Tehran, Iran

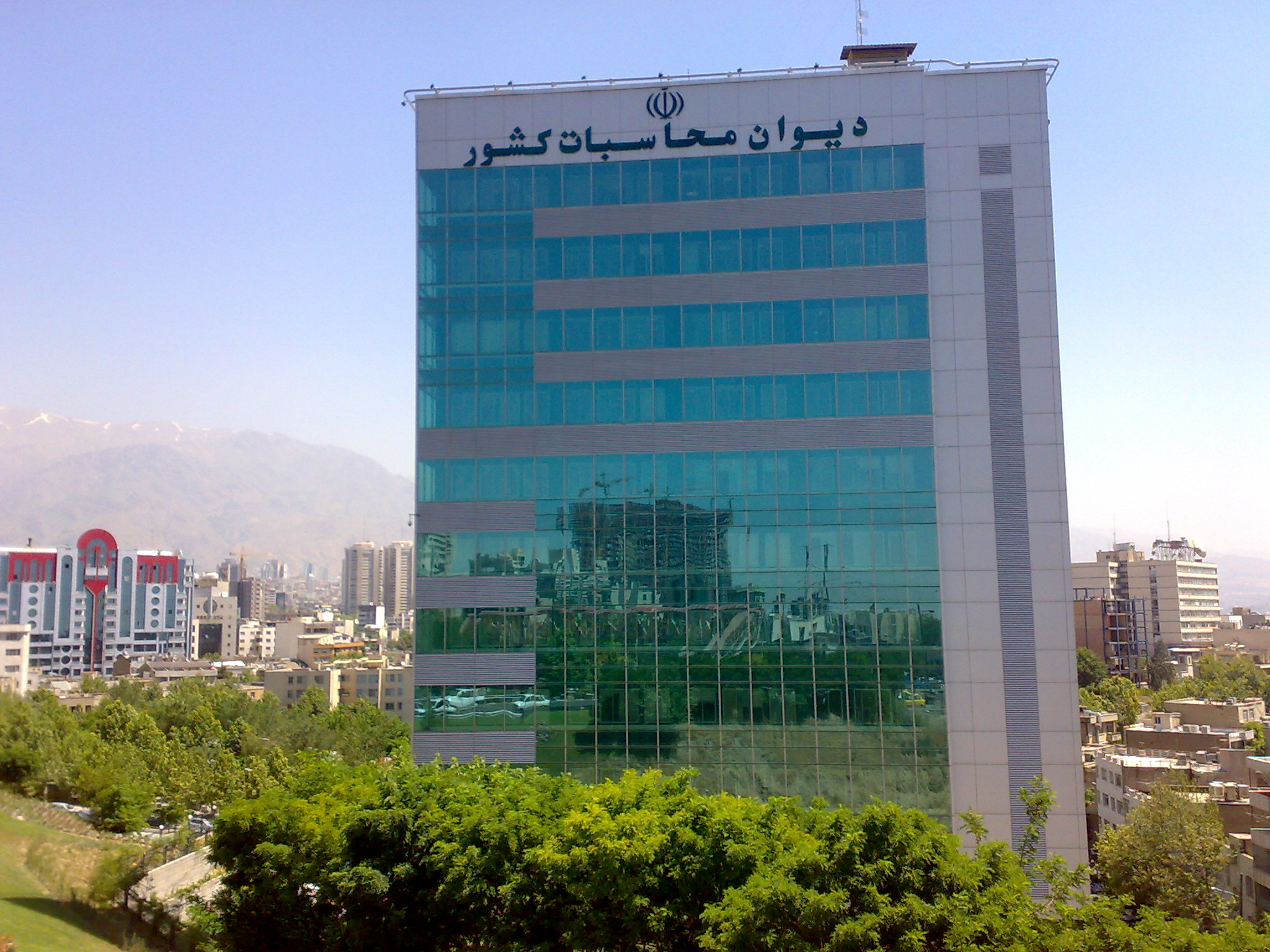
SAC building in Tehran

The Supreme Audit Court of Iran (SAC) (Persian: دیوان محاسبات کشور) is a continuation-based organization of Iran. Located in Tehran, it is supervised by the Iranian Parliament and dates back to 1906.

Articles 54 and 55 of the Constitution of the Islamic Republic of Iran define the objectives and responsibilities of SAC, the most important duty of the organization being the preparation of the government's Budget Liquidation Report, as specified by article 55 of the Constitution.

The state body is tasked with controlling "financial operations and activities of all institutions, companies and organizations which in any manner whatsoever benefit from the state budget."

The main mission of the Supreme Audit Court (SAC) is to oversee the implementation of the annual budget, investigate financial violations, present the Budget Liquidation Report to the Parliament, and address budget deviations.

Since 2010, SAC has been charged with supervising the Iranian Economic Reform Plan. It is also in charge of the supervision of the National Development Fund of Iran.

== Criticism ==
According to Freedomhouse "SAC is little more than a ceremonial body because judges appointed by the regular judiciary often overturn its verdicts". They are not permitted to inspect finances related to the Revolutionary Guards, where most of the corruption within the country is believed to originate.

In December 2010, Supreme Audit Court (SAC) Director Abdolreza Rahmani Fazli was critical of a report presented to the Majlis that described irregularities as "a deficit in the account". Asked whether Transparency International's report on administrative corruption in Iran corresponded with the findings of the Supreme Audit Court, Fazli said the report was based on criteria that the SAC does not recognize. "This does not mean that Iran rejects the report and the country should make efforts to fulfill their criteria," he added. According to the report, payments to government officials accounted for a large part of the infractions in addition to violations of the budget law.

== See also ==
- General Inspection Office (Iran)
- History of the Islamic Republic of Iran
- President Ahmadinejad
- Central Bank of Iran
- Iranian Economic Reform Plan
- Bonyad
- Ministry of Intelligence of Iran
- Privatization in Iran
- Economy of Iran
- Islamic Revolutionary Court
