= Alavi Foundation =

Public not-for-profit organization based in the United States

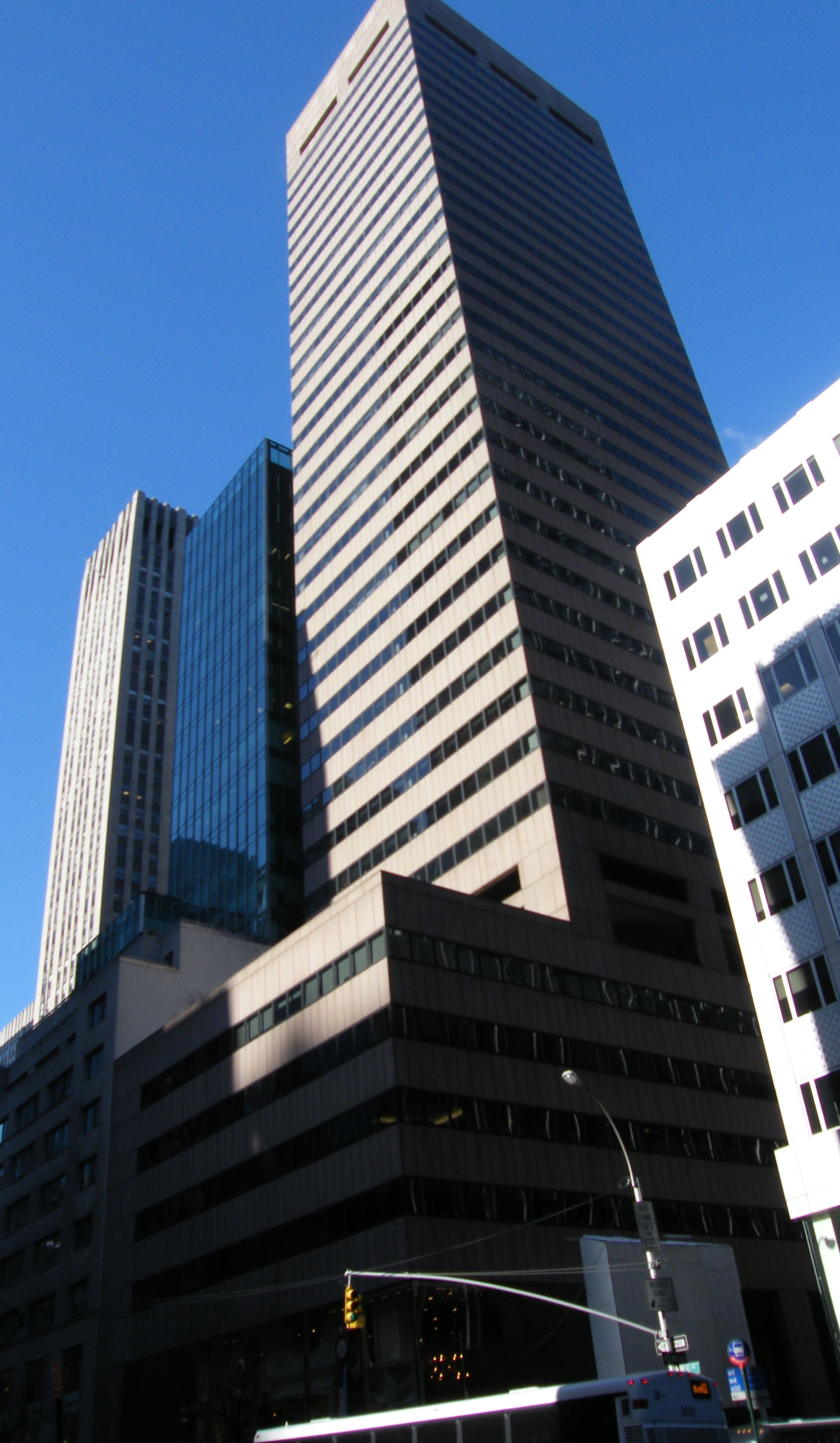
650 Fifth Avenue, a New York City skyscraper that houses the headquarters of the organization, is claimed to be owned by the Foundation

The Alavi Foundation (formerly Pahlavi Foundation) is a public not-for-profit organization based in the United States.

Its headquarters are in Suite 2406 of 650 Fifth Avenue in Midtown Manhattan.

In 2017 U.S. Federal prosecutors sanctioned the Alavi Foundation for being "controlled by the Iranian Government."

== History ==
The Alavi Foundation is the successor organization to the Pahlavi Foundation, a nonprofit group used by Shah Mohammad Reza Pahlavi to advance Iran's charitable interests in America. Most of the charity's income is from rent collected on the Piaget Building, a skyscraper on Fifth Avenue in New York City. The building was built in 1978 for the Shah, who was overthrown in 1979.

After the 1979 Iranian revolution, the Iranian government took over the foundation and created a partnership with Bank Melli Iran, a bank owned by the Iranian government. The bank routed tens of millions of dollars of rental income to Tehran through shell companies while hiding its ownership stake in a Manhattan office tower at 650 Fifth Avenue, in violation of U.S. sanctions.

In November 2009, federal prosecutors in the United States seized its assets. The seized assets include bank accounts; Islamic centers consisting of schools and mosques in New York City, Maryland, California and Houston; more than 100 acres (0.40 km^{2}) in Virginia; and the Piaget Building, a 36-story glass office tower in New York.

Without rent from the skyscraper, the Alavi Foundation would have almost no way to continue supporting the Islamic centers, which house schools and mosques. The most recent tax records show the foundation earned $4.5 million from rents in 2007.

Legal scholars said they know of only a few cases in U.S. history in which law enforcement authorities have seized a house of worship. Marc Stern, a religious-liberty expert with the American Jewish Congress, called such cases extremely rare. On April 18, 2014, the Piaget building was seized by authorities due to alleged links to the Iranian government, citing violation of American sanctions against Tehran.

== Purposes ==
The Alavi Foundation:

- Grants money to American universities including Columbia University and Rutgers University to fund centers for Persian and Middle Eastern studies.
- Encourages universities in North America to offer courses on Persian language, Iranian studies and the Islamic culture with a focus on Shi’ite studies;
- Supports Weekend Persian Schools throughout the United States that link Iranian Americans with their Persian heritage;
- Supports Islamic centers that are established and used by local Muslim communities throughout the United States;
- Established a book distribution program for those unable to purchase these books on their own;
- Provides funds to support disaster relief projects;
- Provides funds to support Islamic and Persian arts;
- Provides funds supporting scholarly research projects in Iranian and Islamic/Shi’ite studies; and
- Has a student loan program.
