= Academic grading in Iran =

The Iranian grading system is similar to France's and other French-patterned grading systems such as Belgium, Lebanon, Venezuela, and Peru in secondary schools and universities. Since a grading guideline is not provided by the Iranian Ministry of Education, conversion to the international scales is carried out using conversion guideline provided for French-patterned grading systems. In specific cases, grades are converted according to the destination institutes' grading policy. The passing grade is 10 and usually a grade of more than 14 out of 20 is considered excellent. The following table is most commonly used by world institutes and universities to convert from the Iranian grading system:

16–20	A	"Upper Class Honors": 1
14–15.99	B	"Second-Class Honors": 2:1
12–13.99	C+	"Lower Second-Class Honors": 2:2
10–11.99	C	"Third-Class Honors": 3rd
9–9.99	C−	"Third-Class Honors": 3rd
8–8.99	D	"Third-Class Honors": 3rd
0–7.99	F	–

The above table does not corroborate with the scale most U.S. and Canadian institutions use where a grade between 16 and 20 scale to an "A," 14–16 scale to a "B," 12–14 scale to a "C," a grade between 10 and 11 is treated as a "D," and a score below 10 is considered a failing grade.

The above is also noted in the Scholaro Database.

Gradings in some universities might be different, for example in the Islamic Azad University, Grades from 17-20 is known to be "Upper Class Honors" or A.
