= Fatemi Circle =

Iranian organized crime group

- Founded: c. 2005
- Named after: Fatemi Street
- Founding location: Tehran
- Territory: Iran
- Membership: 54 suspects 11 jailed (as of January 2011)
- Leader: Mohammad-Reza Rahimi (alleged)
- Activities: Embezzlement, money laundering, bribery, fraud
- Allies: Babak Zanjani (alleged)
- Notable members: Alleged: Jaber Abdali, Elyas Mahmoudi, ? Masoudi

The Fatemi Circle (Persian: حلقه فاطمی) is a nickname given to a clique of statesmen within the Government of Mahmoud Ahmadinejad, reported to have been involved in numerous corruption scandals in Iran.

The clique became publicly known in April 2010, when Elyas Naderan, a Majlis member stated "Mr. Rahimi is the head of the corruption circle in Fatemi Street who made decisions about collecting resources from corrupt sources and about their distribution, and now almost all members of this economically corrupt network in Fatemi Street have been arrested except the current First Vice President of Iran." The claim was backed by Ahmad Tavakkoli and Ali Motahari.

According to the Chief Justice of Iran, "The members of this gang were able to deprive citizens and the treasury of billions of tomans through forging administrative and judicial documents. One of them alone was reported to have embezzled 6 billion tomans ($6 million USD)."

== Iran Insurance case ==
The Fatemi Circle is said to be responsible for an embezzlement scandal that occurred within the state-owned Iran Insurance company. In 2013, the names of 12 people convicted in the case was announced: Mostafa Hamzeh-Nosi, Davoud Fahimi-Roudposhti, Badiollah Kiani, Jaber Abdali, Mohammad-Taghi Tavakkoli, Ali Jalil, Shahriar Khosravi, Mahmoud Bagheri, Iraj Abdolhamidi, Fariborz Farid-Danesh, Davoud Sarkhosh-Shahri and Yousef-Ali Darounparvar.
