= Iran Insurance Company =

Iranian state-owned insurance enterprise

Iran Insurance
- Company type: Government-owned corporation
- Industry: Financial services, insurance
- Founded: November 6, 1935; 90 years ago
- Headquarters: Tehran, Iran
- Number of locations: 204 branches, 7935 agencies
- Area served: Worldwide
- Key people: Ali Jabbari (CEO)
- Products: Life, health insurance, Property insurance, Casualty insurance and Investment management
- Services: Life and Non-life insurance
- Net income: ▲3,719,678 million Iranian Rials (1391 (Note: The year 1391 in Iranian calendar, equals to 20 March 2012 to 20 March 2013.))
- Total assets: 34,000 billion Iranian Rials (2014)
- Owner: Iranian government
- Number of employees: 4,562 (2014)
- Website: iraninsurance.ir bimehir.ae iraninsuranceint.com

Iran Insurance Joint-stock Company (Persian: شرکت سهامی بیمه ایران; Sherkat-e Sahāmi-ye Bime-ye Irān) is an Iranian government-owned corporation providing a wide range of insurances. Established in 1935, the company is Iran's largest insurance corporation" and holds over 50% of the national market share. All of insurance services will offer in individual and legal agencies such as Etemad Gostar Hakim agency company or in legal intermediaries

== See also ==
- Insurance agents and brokers in Iran
- Banking and insurance in Iran
- Companies of Pahlavi Iran
