= Physical Society of Iran =

The Physics Society of Iran
- انجمن فیزیک ایران
- Abbreviation: PSI
- Formation: 1963; 63 years ago
- Type: Professional/Academic
- Location: Tehran, Iran
- Members: 10,000
- President: Hamidreza Moshfegh
- Key people: Mahmoud Hessabi, Yusef Sobouti, Reza Mansouri
- Website: www.psi.ir

The Physical Society of Iran (PSI) (Persian:انجمن فيزيک ايران) is Iran's professional and academic society of physicists. PSI is a non-profit organization aimed at establishing and strengthening scientific contacts between physicists and academic members of the country's institutes of higher education in the field of physics.

The society has over 10,000 members inside and outside Iran. In addition to its awards scheme and publications programme, the Physical Society of Iran holds annual conferences in different fields, including optics and condensed matter physics. The society has proved instrumental in improving the state of education and research in physics throughout the country.

The society organizes annual meetings. It has also had collaboration with the American Physical Society. In October 2003 APS and PSI jointly sponsored a school/workshop on string theory in Tehran.

The society's main journal is the Iranian Journal of Physics Research, which is published via the Isfahan University of Technology Press, and is recognized by the Ministry of Science of Iran.

== History ==
Iranian Physical Society (1940)

The Physical Society of Iran was established in 1963 by Iran's elite physicists and engineers. Among the founders was Yusef Sobouti, currently chancellor of IASBS.

The first Annual Physics Conference of Iran was inaugurated in 1973 at Sepah Bank's arboretum, followed by Iran's second national conference on Physics the next year at Shahid Beheshti University. Activities of the society suffered a setback during the early years of the revolution.

== Presidents ==
- Yousef Sobouti (1988–91 and 1996–99)
- Reza Mansouri
- Hessamaddin Arfaei
- Ezatolah Arzi
- Hadi Akbarzadeh
- Shahin Rouhani
- Mohammad Reza Ejtehadi
- Hamidreza Moshfegh (current)

== Awards ==
The following are awarded annually by PSI to selected recipients during the Annual Physics Conference awards ceremony:

=== General ===
- The Mahmoud Hessabi Award (جايزه حسابی)
- The PSI Award (جايزه انجمن فيزيک ايران)
- The Educational Apparatus Award (جايزه ساخت دستگاه آموزشی)
- Best Physics Sci-fi Essay Award (جايزه بهترين داستان علمی تخيلی فیزیک)
- Best Physics Teacher Award (جايزه دوسالانه دبير فيزيک برگزيده) (bi-annual)
- Best Conference Poster Award (جايزه پوستر برگزيده کنفرانس فيزيک)
- Best Student Poster Award (جايزه پوستر برگزيده همايش دانشجويی فيزيک)

== See also ==
- Higher education in Iran
- Institute of Biochemistry and Biophysics
