= Zanjan University of Medical Sciences =

Iranian university

- دانشگاه علوم پزشکی زنجان
- Type: Public
- Established: 1987
- Chancellor: Saeid Sardari
- Academic staff: 421
- Students: 4066
- Location: Zanjan, Iran, Zanjan Province, Iran; 36.7031°N 48.5121°E
- Campus: Urban
- Website: www.zums.ac.ir
- Location in Iran

Zanjan University of Medical Sciences is a public medical sciences university located in Zanjan, Iran. It has various schools including schools of medicine, dentistry, pharmacy, nursery & midwifery, etc.

== See also ==
- Zanjan University
- Institute for Advanced Studies in Basic Sciences
