= Sadollah Nasiri Gheydari =

Iranian physicist and university president

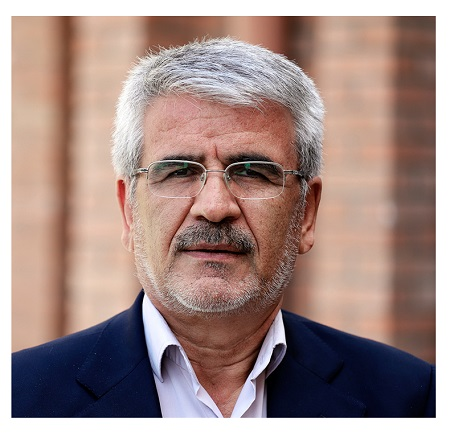

Chancellor of Shahid Beheshti University
- In office September 2, 2019 – November 16, 2022

Member of the Parliament of Iran
- In office 28 May 2008 – 28 May 2012 Serving with Jamshid Ansari
- Constituency: Zanjan and Tarom

Personal details
- Born: 1959 (age 66–67) Qeydar, Zanjan province, Iran
- Party: National Trust Party; Democracy Party
- Education: Shiraz University

Sadollah Nasiri Gheydari (Persian: سعدالله نصیری قیداری) is the former President of Shahid Beheshti University of Tehran. He is a physicist and professor at Shahid Beheshti University, Iran.

After obtaining his B.Sc. in 1984, M.Sc. in 1988 and Ph.D. in 1992 under Yousef Sobouti, all from Shiraz University, he continued as associate professor in the Department of Physics of Shiraz University. In 1993, he was transferred to Zanjan University where he held various positions including head of its Department of Physics from 1994 to 1996, rector of its College of Science from 1996 to 1998 and again from 2002 to 2004, and vice-chancellor of education from 1998 to 2001.

From 2002 to 2006, he was president of the Iranian Astronomical Society and was re-appointed in 2011. In 2008, he was appointed vice president of the Iranian Physical Society.

Gheydari's main research interests relate to oscillations of stars in the presence of magnetic fields, quantum mechanics in phase space, and coronal heating, as well as the selection of sites for optical observatories. His work has included a formulation of quantum mechanics in extended phase space (phase space in position and momentum extended to include time and the value of the Hamiltonian as additional phase-space variables).

== Selected publications ==
- S. Khademi, S. Nasiri: Generalized gauge transformations in phase space picture of quantum mechanics: Kirkwood representation, Journal of Physics: Conference Series vol. 128, no. 1, 2008, 012016, doi:10.1088/1742-6596/128/1/012016 (PDF)
- Samira Bahrami, Sadolah Nasiri: Symmetry Transformation in Extended Phase Space: the Harmonic Oscillator in the Husimi Representation, Symmetry Integrability and Geometry Methods and Applications (2008), vol. 4, doi:10.3842/SIGMA.2008.014 (link), arXiv: 0802.0482
- S. Nasiri: Quantum potential and symmetries in extended phase space, SIGMA 2 (2006), 062, quant-ph/0511125
- S. Nasiri, S. Khademi, S. Bahrami, F. Taati: Generalized distribution functions in extended phase space. In: V.K. Dobrev (ed.): Proceedings QST4, Heron Press Sofia, 2006, vol. 2, pp. 820–826
- S. Nasiri, Y. Sobouti, F. Taati: Phase space quantum mechanics – direct, Journal of Mathematical Phys. 47 (2006), 092106, quant-ph/0605129
- S. Nasiri: Distribution functions on the light of uncertainty principle, Jr. Sci. Tech., 29, A2, 259, 2005
- S. Nasiri: Path integral approach to quantum state functions, Jr. Sci. Tech., 4, 3, 1995
- Y. Sobouti, S. Nasiri: A phase space formulation of quantum state functions, International Journal of Modern Physics B, 7 (1993), pp. 3255–3272
- Sadollah Nasiri, Samira Bahrami: Reality of the Wigner Functions and Quantization, Research Letters in Physics, vol. 2009 (2009), article ID 298790, doi:10.1155/2009/298790
