= Islamic Azad University, Zanjan Branch =

- دانشگاه آزاد اسلامی واحد زنجان; Danushgah-e Âzad-e Eslâmi-ye Vahed-e Zenjan
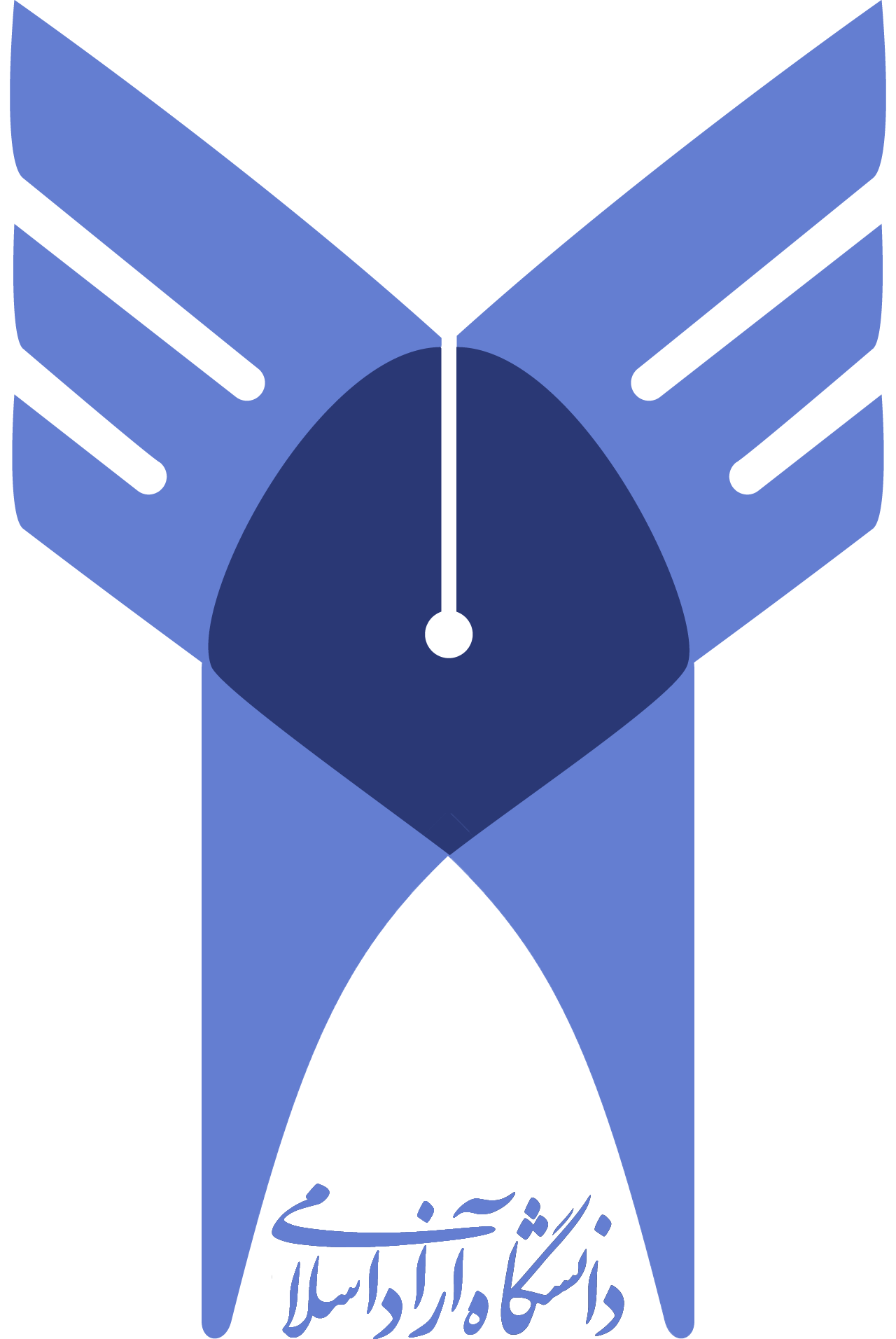
- Islamic Azad University logo
- Motto: آرمان ایرانی برای جهانی شدن
- Motto in English: " Iranian aspirations for globalization "
- Type: Private
- Established: 1985
- President: Dr. Ahmad Naghilou
- Academic staff: 320
- Administrative staff: 300
- Students: 14,000
- Location: Zanjan, Iran
- Campus: Urban
- Colors: Turquoise and White
- Nickname: IAUZ
- Website: www.iauz.ac.ir/

The Islamic Azad University, Zanjan Branch (informally Islamic Azad University of Zanjan) is a private research university in Zanjan, Iran.

== History ==
The university was founded in 1985 and admitted 175 students on that year. The university initially began its operation by renting a building.

== Faculties and Departments ==
The Islamic Azad University of Zanjan is divided into five faculties, each sub-divided into schools.

=== Faculty of Technology and Engineering ===
- Department of Architecture
- Department of Civil engineering
- Department of Geodesy
- Department of Urban Studies
- Department of Materials & Metallurgy engineering
- Department of Transportation
- Department of Soil Sciences
- Department of Mechanical Engineering

=== Faculty of Electrical and Computer Engineering ===
- Department of Electrical Engineering
- Department of Computer Engineering
- Department of Information Technology
- Department of Industrial Engineering

=== Faculty of Educational Sciences ===
- Department of Physical Education and Sport Sciences
- Department of Theology
- Department of Psychology
- Department of English Language

=== Faculty of Foundation and Medical Sciences ===
- Department of Midwifery
- Department of Nursing
- Department of Biological Sciences(Genetics, Animal, Micro)
- Department of Chemistry
- Department of Physics
- Department of Statistics

=== Faculty of Humanities ===
The faculty was founded in 2009 and is located in Emam campus.

- Department of linguistics and Persian Literature
- Department of Political Sciences
- Department of International Relations
- Department of Commercial Management
- Department of Accountancy
- Department of Law and Justice
- Department of Social Sciences
- Department of Banking and Insurance

== Research & Facilities ==
The unit began its work in October 1989.

== Education ==
Branch unit of 45 major courses of study in 1984 to over 127 students in 1989 has increased. The number of students over the same period of 8988 students has increased to over 13 150 students.

Islamic Azad University, with five of Humanities and Social Sciences, Faculty of Educational Sciences, Faculty of Science and Medicine, School of Electrical and Computer Engineering and the School is active.

== Field research ==
Branch of ISI papers from 27 papers so far in 2004 has reached 110 articles. Branch unit number printed books as a textbook is about 52.

== Development areas ==
Over the past five years the capacity of 45 thousand square meters of teaching space and recreation department has increased to more than 135 200 thousand square meters. Branch units with three residential complexes.

== Portal conferences and Islamic Azad University, Zanjan ==
New portal: portal conferences and Islamic Azad University, Zanjan University is the base for centralized management of scientific events.

== See also ==
- University of Zanjan
- Institute for Advanced Studies in Basic Sciences
