= Institute for Advanced Studies in Basic Sciences =

University in Zanjan, Iran

Coordinates: 36°42′19″N 48°30′24″E

- دانشگاه تحصیلات تکمیلی علوم پایه زنجان
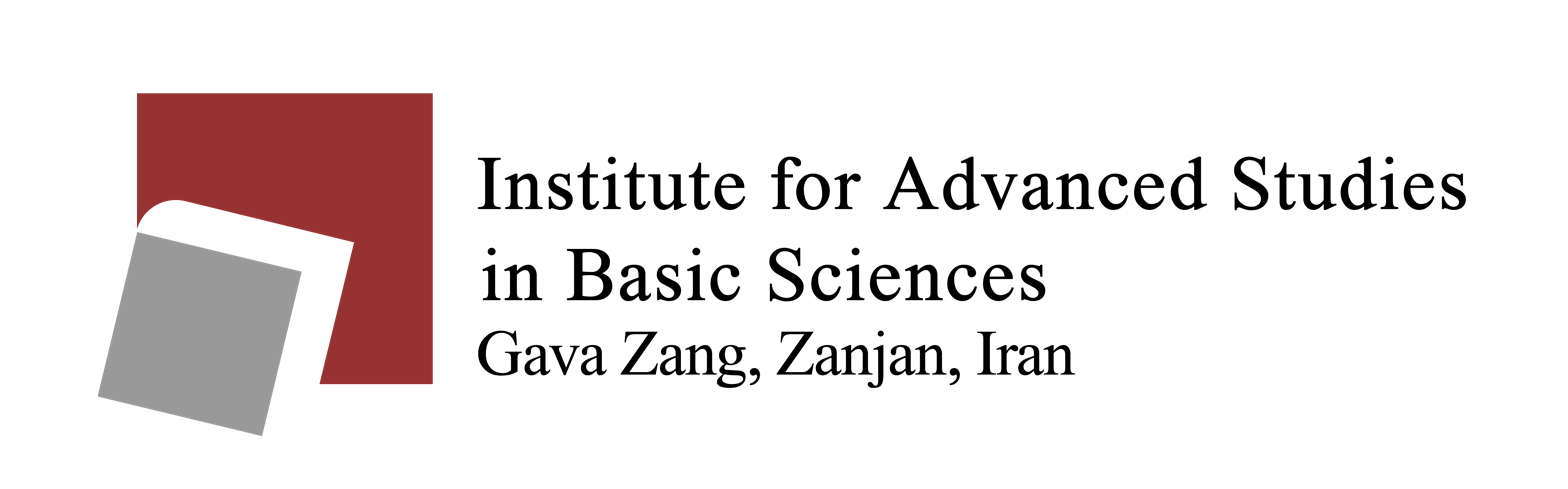
- Institute for Advanced Studies in Basic Sciences (IASBS)
- Type: Public
- Established: 1991
- Founders: Yousef Sobouti
- Rector: Sadollah Nasiri Gheydari (2024-present); Babak Karimi (2016-2024); HamidReza Khalesifard (2014-2016); Rasoul Khodabakhsh (2010-2014); Yousef Sobouti (1991-2010)
- Students: 1200
- Location: Zanjan, Zanjan Province, Iran
- Campus: Suburban
- Colours: Milano Red; Nobel
- Website: https://www.iasbs.ac.ir/

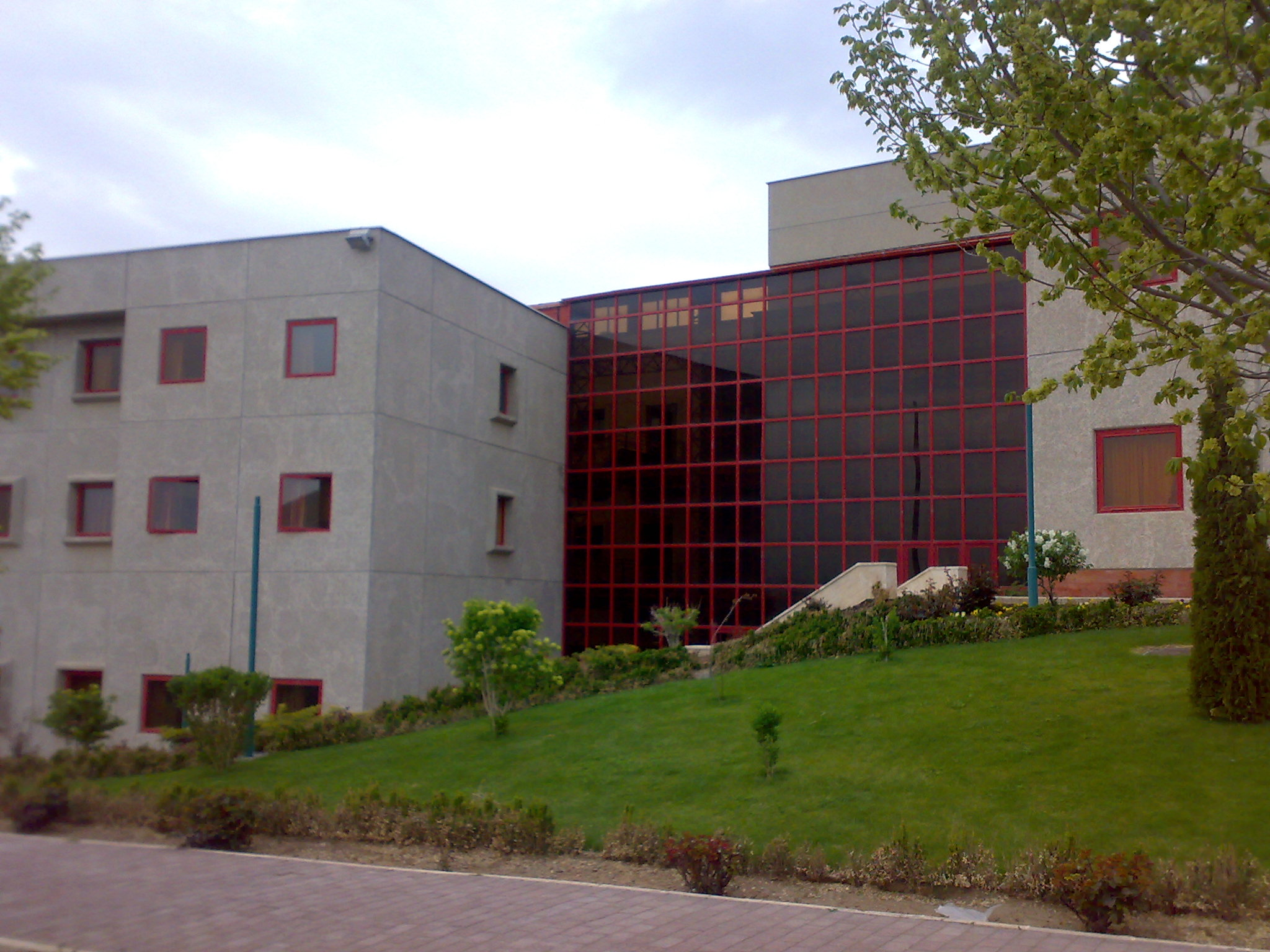
Institute for Advanced Studies in Basic Sciences

Institute for Advanced Studies in Basic Sciences (IASBS) (Persian: دانشگاه تحصیلات تکمیلی علوم پایه زنجان, Daneshgah-e Tehesilât-e Tekimili-ye Olum-e Paih-e Zanjaan) also known as Zanjan Graduate University of Basic Sciences is a public advanced research center and university in Zanjan, Iran founded in 1991 by Prof. Yousef Sobouti. The goal of establishing IASBS was to provide a leading research-based institute in advanced science topics for both researchers and students in Iran.

The institute offers various M.Sc. and PhD degrees in Computer Science, Mathematics, Physics, Geophysics, Biophysics, Biochemistry and Chemistry. Although IASBS was established as a graduate-level degree-granting institution, it also offers a B.Sc. program in Computer Engineering. Acceptance to the institute is competitive and entrance to its programs requires performing well in the Iranian University Entrance Exam, known as 'Konkour'.

== The University Campus ==
Zanjan city in Iranian Azerbaijan region, 298 km to the north-west of Tehran, was chosen for the Institute. The location was far enough from Tehran to not be affected by the distractions of the city but close enough to pursue the many ensuing official and budgetary problems in Tehran. The main campus of the university is located close to Zanjan University of Medical Sciences in Gavazang area, Zanjan, Iran. IASBS campus is widely credited to be a Green campus with plants and greeneries being part of the campus design, even in classes and buildings. Moreover, IASBS is one of the few universities in Iran benefiting from solar energy solutions. Buildings in main campus are:

- Department of Physics
- Department of Chemistry
- Department of Mathematics
- Department of Computer Science and Information Technology
- Department of Earth Sciences
- Department of Biological Sciences
- Torkaman Library
- House of Science
- Science and Technology Park (Zanjan Techno-Center)
- University Dining Hall
- Gym (I and II)
- Mosque
- Dormitories

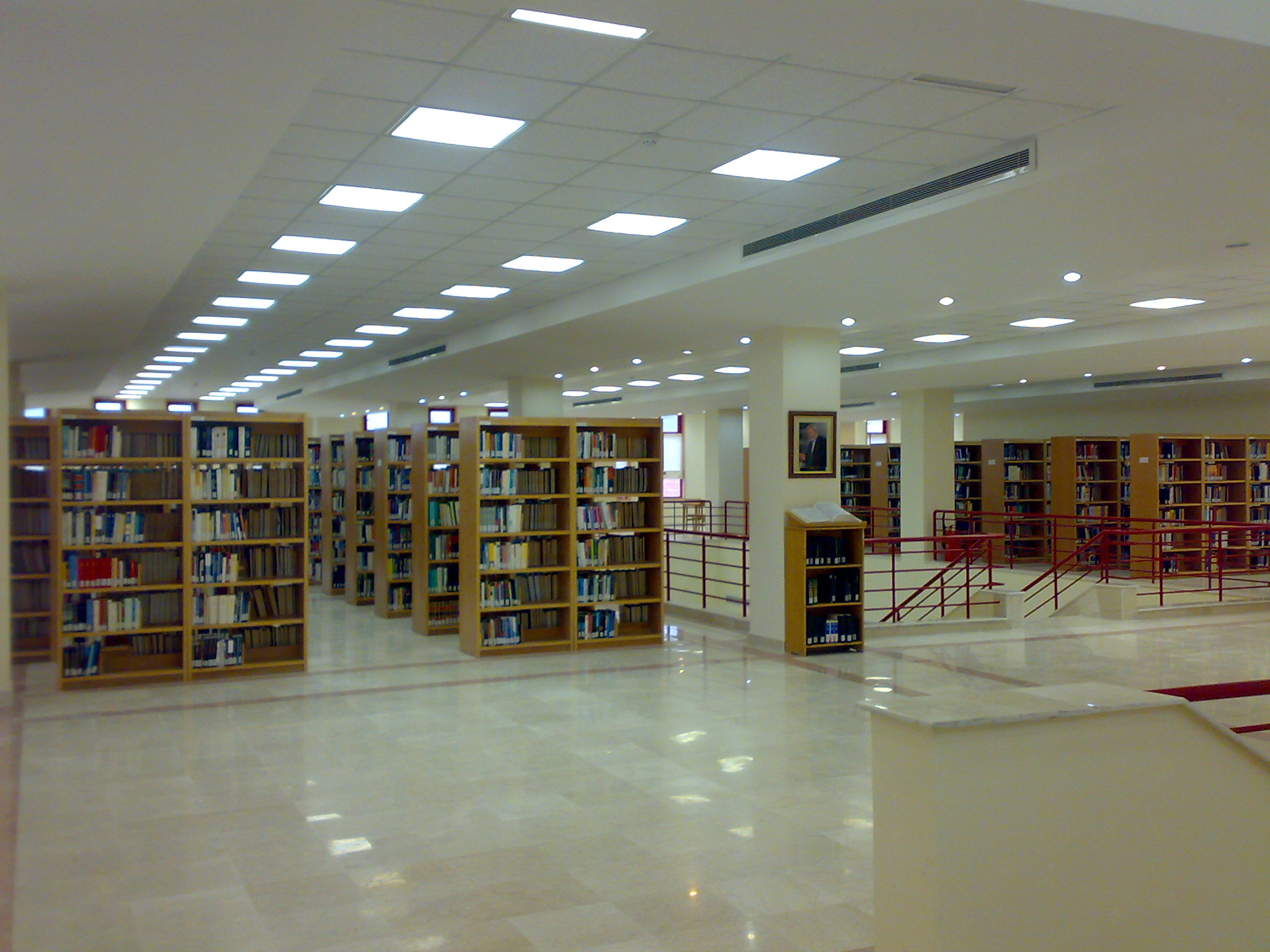
Torkaman Library

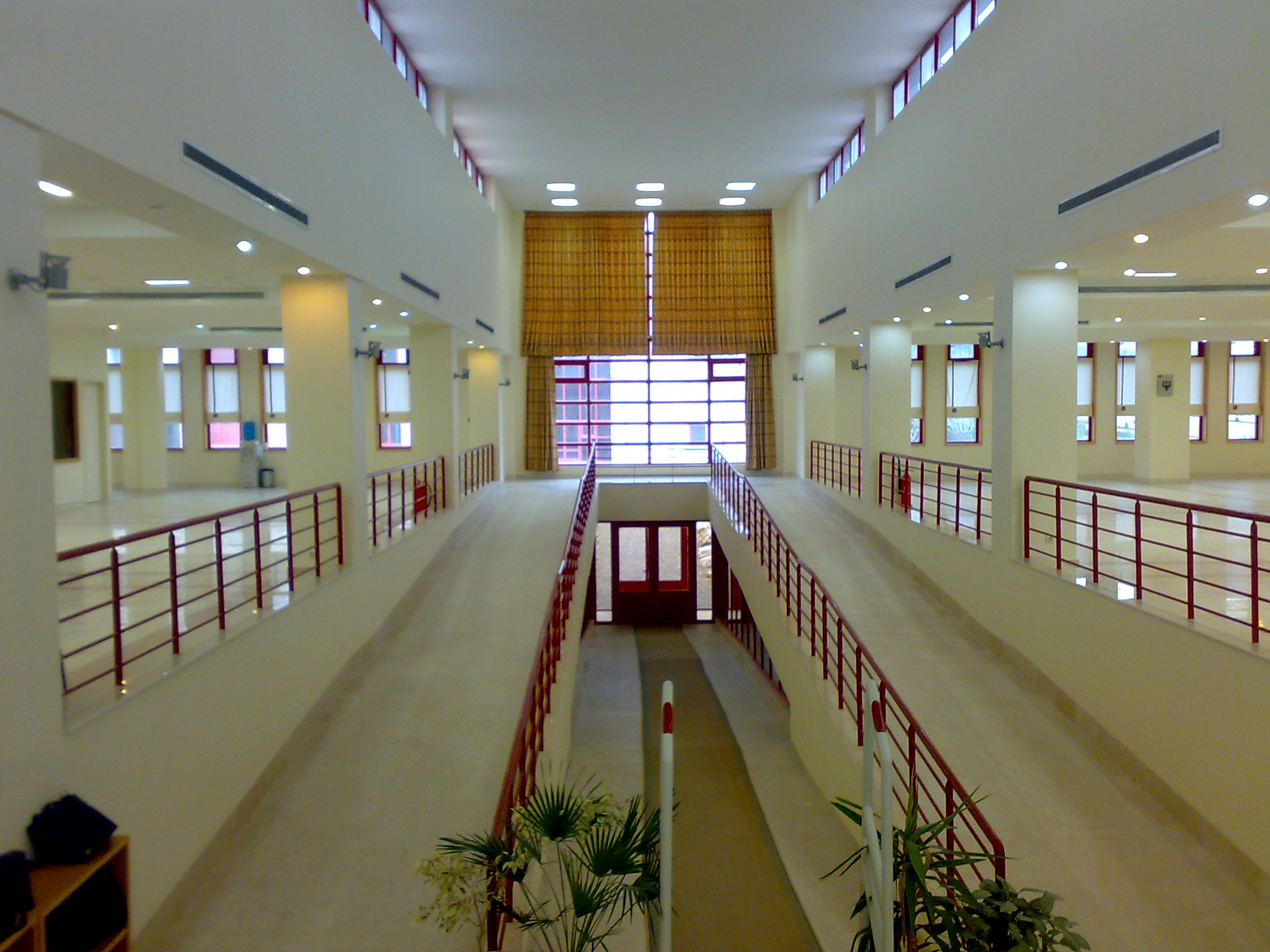
Torkaman Library

== Departments and Research Centers ==
IASBS has 6 departments and 2 research centers.

=== Department of Physics ===
The Physics Department started its activity in 1992 as the first department of IASBS. The M.Sc. program was launched in 1992 with 3 faculty members and 7 students. In 1995, the first PhD students were admitted to work on theoretical condensed matter physics, astrophysics and mathematical physics. After a while, graduate programs in experimental optics were established. In 2000, a 7-year program leading to a PhD degree was established. In this program students directly proceed to their PhD thesis after completing their undergraduate and graduate courses, thereby skipping the M.Sc. dissertation. At present, IASBS is the only institute in the country offering such a program. Research in Department of Physics is focused in Astrophysics and Cosmology, Hard condensed matter, Soft condensed matter, Statistical mechanics, Optics and Photonics.

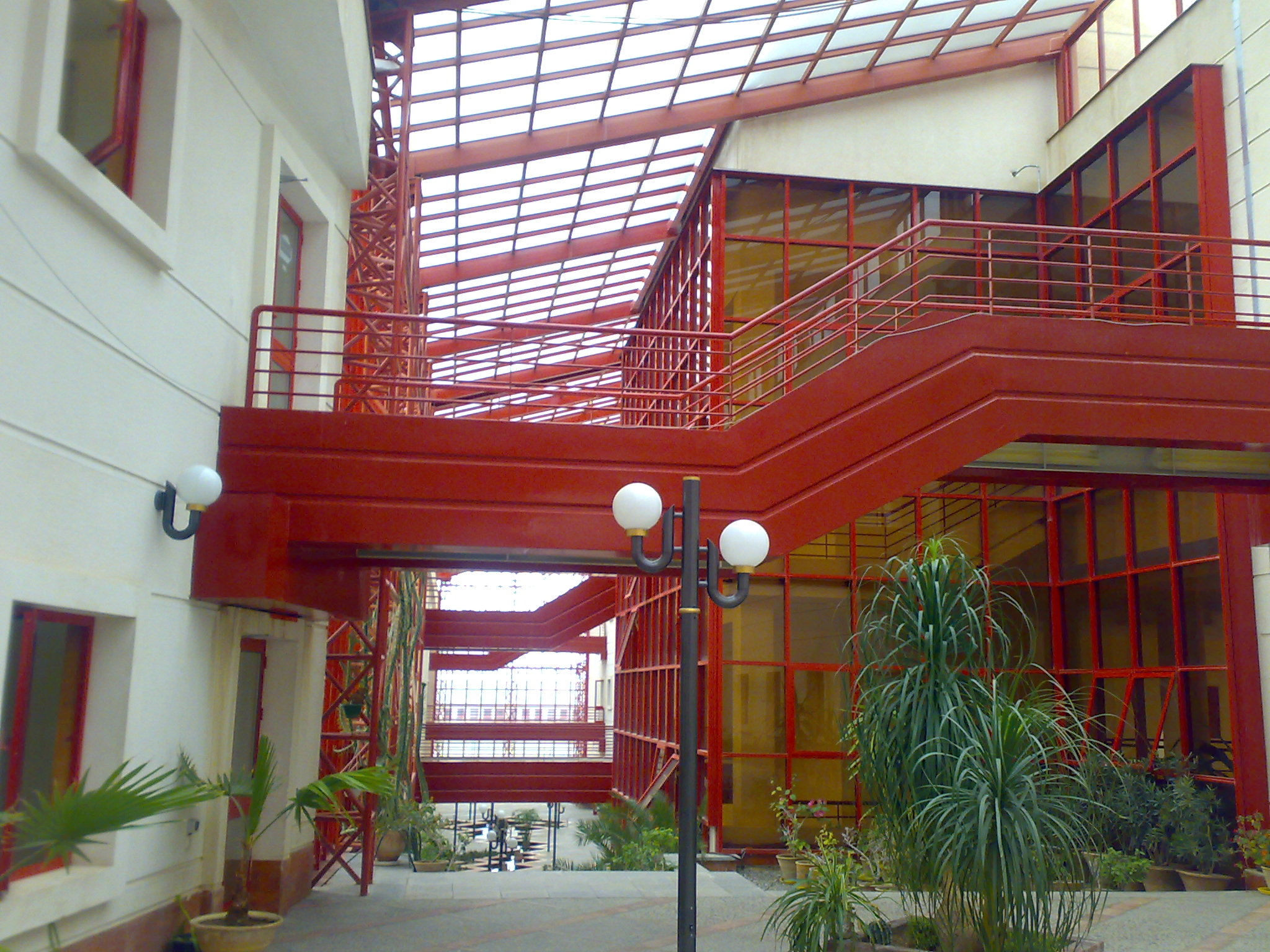
Department of Physics

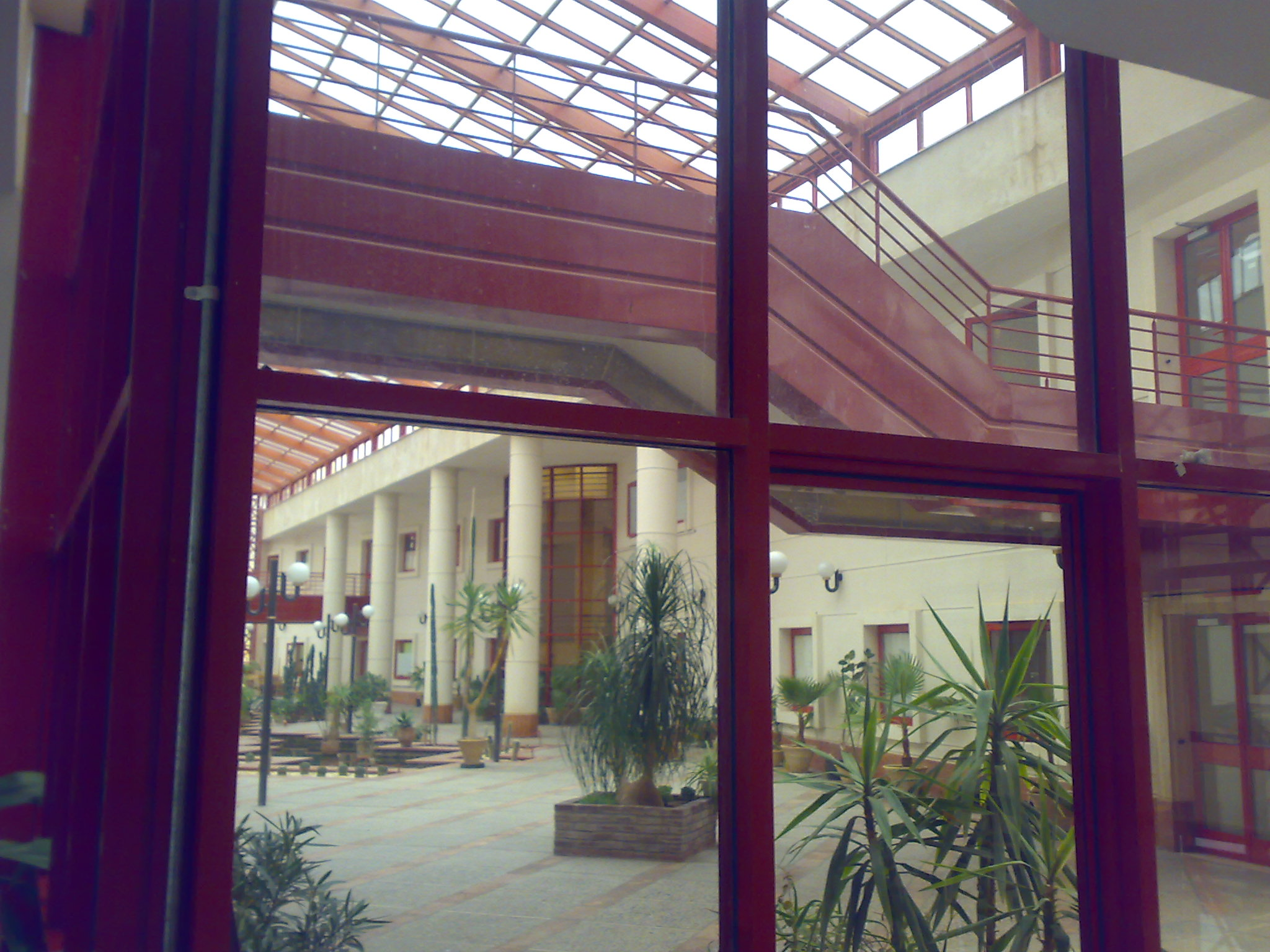
Department of Physics

=== Department of Mathematics ===
Established in 1994, The Department of Mathematics offers M.Sc. and PhD programs. The active research groups of the Department are in the fields of Algebra, Analysis, Geometry, Graph theory, Computer Science and Financial Mathematics.

=== Department of Chemistry ===
The Department of Chemistry at the IASBS started its formal activities in fall 1999 with five Master’s students and five faculty members, seven years after the opening of the Institute. The courses initially focused in two areas, analytical chemistry, and organic chemistry. In the winter of 2005, first group of PhD students started their studies. Currently, there are more than 200 PhD and Master’s Students and 20 faculty members in the department. Research is focused in Organic Chemistry, Analytical Chemistry, Physical Chemistry, Inorganic Chemistry, Nano Chemistry, and Polymer Chemistry.

=== Department of Computer Science and Information Technology ===
Department of Computer Science and Information Technology was established in 2003 with the B.Sc. program in Information Technology and, immediately after, the M.Sc. program in Computer Science. Now department runs an undergraduate program in computer engineering and M.Sc. and PhD programs in Computer Science. Research in this department is mainly focused on Algorithms and Theory of Computing, Artificial Intelligence, System Theory and Data Mining.

=== Department of Earth Sciences ===
Department of Earth Sciences was established in 1999 inside the Department of Physics. Now as an independent department, It offers M.Sc. and PhD programs in geophysics and M.Sc. programs in Structural Geology and Tectonics. Department of Earth Sciences is currently active in the fields of Geophysics, Tectonics, Petrology and Hydrology and Hydrogeology.

=== Department of Biological Sciences ===
Department of Biological Sciences was established in 2008 as the newest department of the Institute for Advanced Studies in Basic Sciences. At present, the department offers M.Sc. programs in biochemistry and biophysics and direct PhD programs in biochemistry and biophysics. The research laboratories in department of biological sciences are Biochemistry, Biophysics, Bacterial Culture, Cell Culture and Bio-informatics.

=== Advanced Research Centers ===
- Center for Research in Climate Change and Global Warming
- Research Center for Basic Sciences and Modern Technologies (RBST)

== Programs ==
IASBS was established as a graduate-level degree-granting institution. Now it offers M.Sc. and PhD degrees in Computer Science, Mathematics, Physics, Geophysics, Biophysics, Biochemistry and Chemistry. Since September 2000, however, it has started a program in physics for a group of distinguished high school graduates. The program, a first attempt at the national level, will train these selected groups of students over a period of seven years, granting them a PhD degree in physics. In this program students directly proceed to their PhD thesis after completing their undergraduate and graduate courses, thereby skipping the M.Sc. dissertation. IASBS also offers a bachelor of science degree in computer engineering which is the only undergraduate program in the institute. The institute also used to run a joint undergraduate program in Information Technology with Heriot-Watt University of the United Kingdom.

== Awards and Rankings ==
- Ranked 2nd in Iran by Iran Science Elites Federation (2016)
- Ranked 8th in Iran by Islamic Science Citation Center in 2015-2016 and 2016-2017
- Announced as the centre of excellence in physics by Iran Ministry of Science, Research and Technology
- Awarded by Islamic Development Bank in science and technology

SCImago Institutions Rankings:

- 2017 World Ranking: 612
- 2016 World Ranking: 620
- 2015 World Ranking: 617

== The International Advisory Council ==
The International Advisory Council of the Institute is composed of a host of scholars and scientists. Members of the Council assist the Institute in delineating its general themes of research, establishing new disciplines, attracting prominent researchers and evaluating its scientific achievements.

=== Members ===
- Seifallah Randjbar-Daemi, The Abdus Salam ICTP, Italy
- Mehran Kardar, MIT, USA
- Bahram Mashhoon, University of Missouri, USA
- Cumrun Vafa, Harvard University, USA

== Notable alumni ==
List of notable alumni from the institute include:

- Yousef Sobouti (Physics): First place of the Khwarizmi International Award in basic sciences (1999). Medal Lecture, in Physical Sciences, The Third World Academy of Sciences, TWAS (2000). Selected member of Iranian Science and Culture Hall of Fame, Unforgettable Faces (2001)
- Ramin Golestanian (Physics): He was awarded the Holweck Prize (2014). First place of the Khwarizmi Young Award in basic sciences (2000). Distinguished researcher elected by Iranian ministry of sciences, research and technology (2001). Frederic Joliot Visiting Chair at Ecole Superieure de Physique et de Chimie Industrielles (ESPCI) in Paris (2000)

== See also ==
- University of Zanjan
- Zanjan University of Medical Sciences
- Islamic Azad University of Zanjan
- Institute for Studies in Theoretical Physics and Mathematics (IPM)
- Higher Education in Iran
- List of universities in Iran
