= Iranian Journal of Physics Research =

Open access academic journal

The Iranian Journal of Physics Research (Persian: مجله پژوهش فيزيک ايران) is a quarterly peer-reviewed open access scientific journal of physics published by the Physics Society of Iran. It was established in 1995, with S. Mohammad Amini as editor-in-chief. Originally publishing exclusively in Persian, the journal began accepting articles in English as well in 1999. In 2004 the publication frequency was raised from 2 to 4 issues per year. The journal is abstracted and indexed in Scopus.
