= University of Zanjan =

University in Zanjan province, Iran

- Persian: دانشگاه زنجان; Dāneshgāh-e Zanjan
- University of Zanjan coat of arms
- Type: Public
- Established: 1975
- President: Dr. Jalal Bazargan
- Faculty: 470
- Administrative staff: 450
- Students: 10,414
- Location: Zanjan, Iran
- Campus: Suburban
- Athletics: 13 teams
- Website: http://www.znu.ac.ir/

University of Zanjan Persian: دانشگاه زنجان
- Village and University
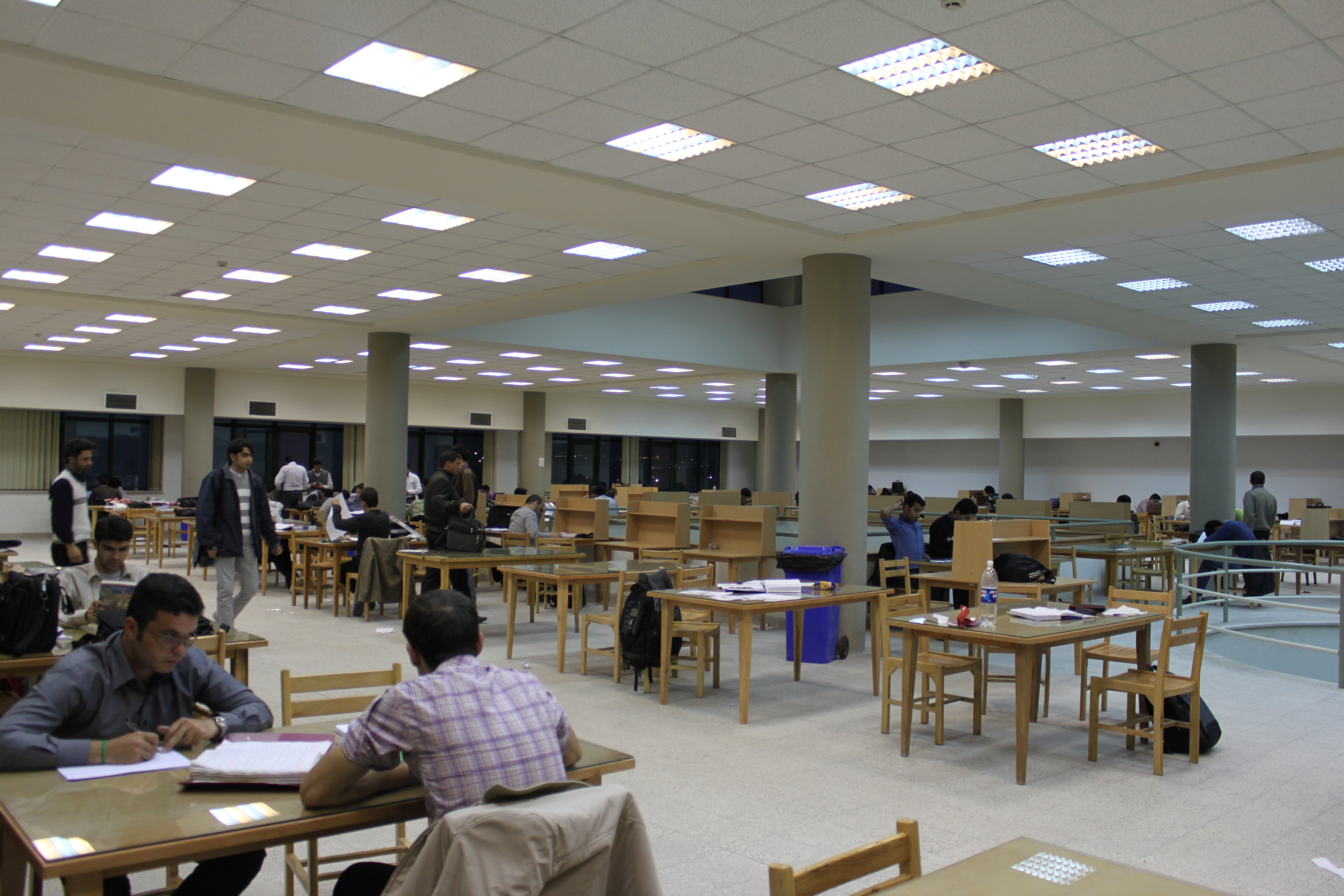
- Central Library

- Location within Iran
- Coordinates: 36°41′27″N 48°24′07″E
- Country: Iran
- Province: Zanjan
- County: Zanjan
- District: Central
- Rural District: Zanjanrud-e Bala

Population (2016)
  - Total: 3,881
- Time zone: UTC+3:30 (IRST)

The University of Zanjan (ZNU) (Persian: دانشگاه زنجان) (Note: Romanized as Dāneshgāh-e Zanjan) is located in Zanjan, Iran. It was founded in 1975 and organized into four faculties. Today, it is one of the largest universities in the country, with over 10,000 students.

== History ==
ZNU (the ex-Higher School for Agriculture & Animal Science) started its activities in 1975.

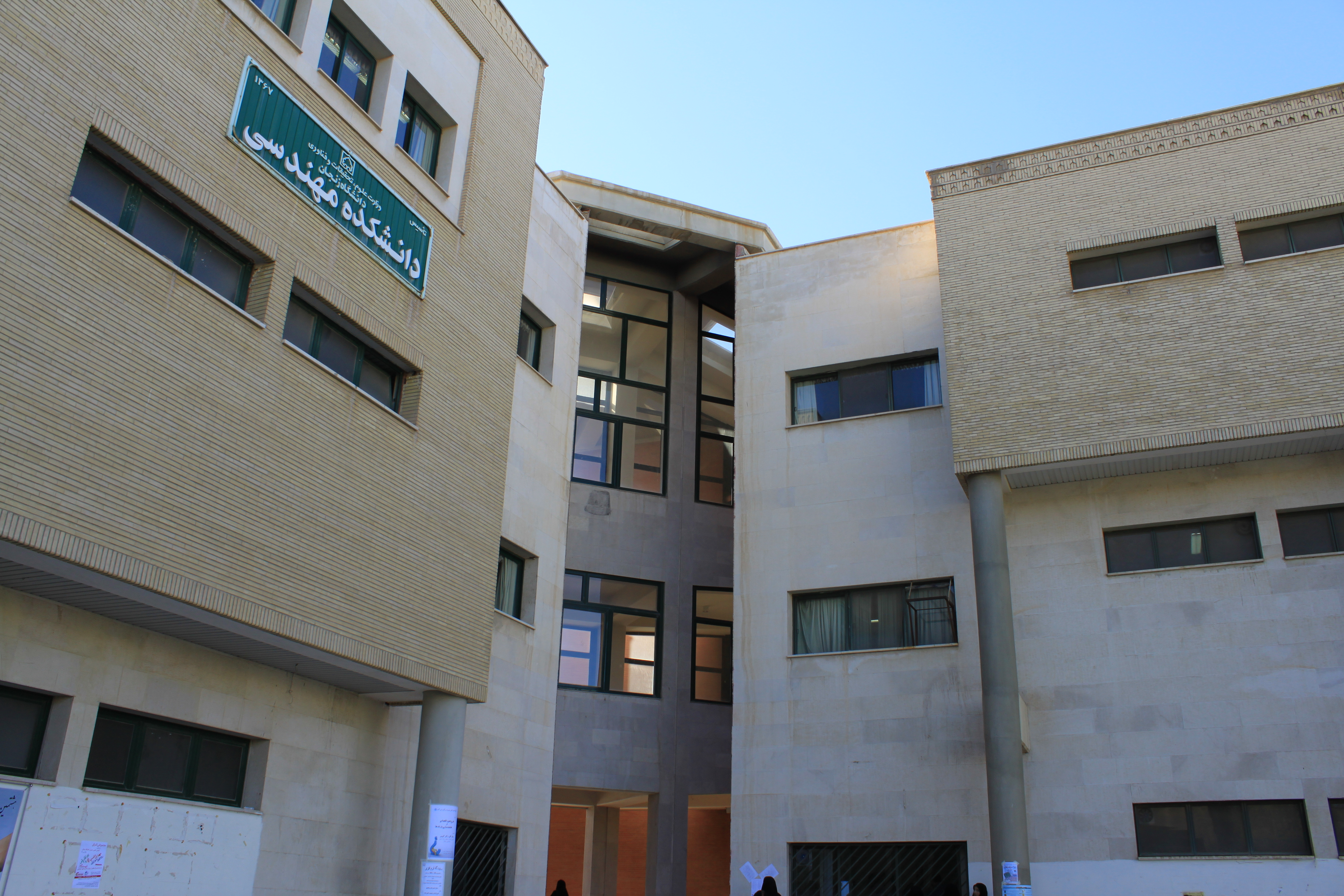
Faculty of Engineering

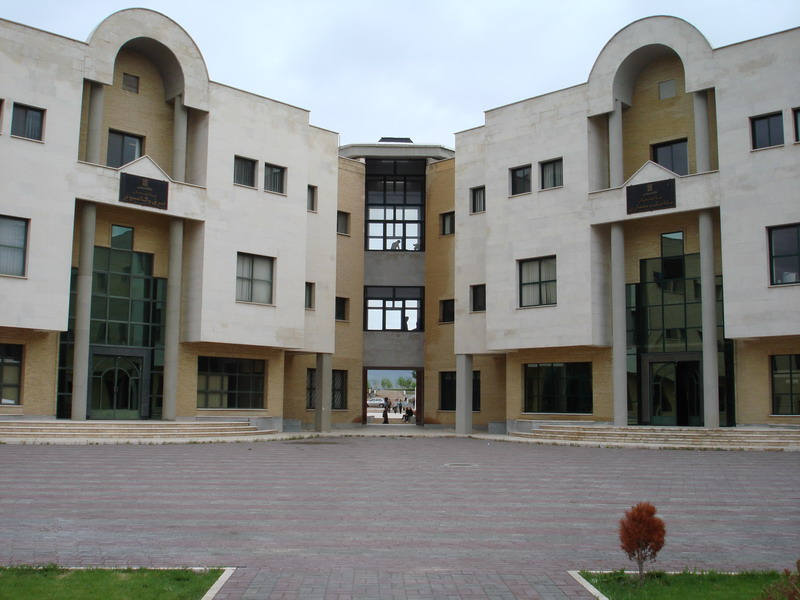
Faculty of Engineering

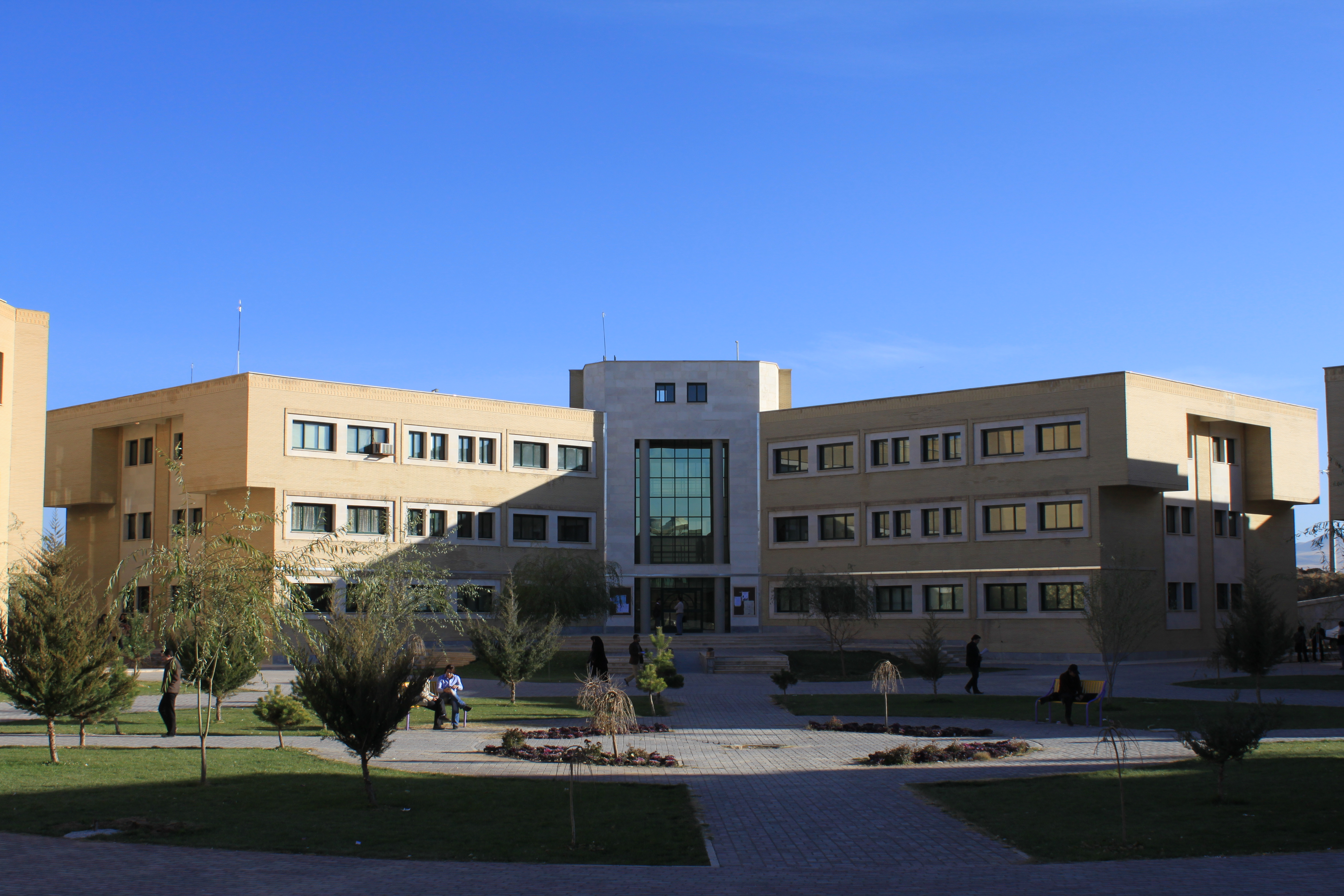
Department of Chemistry Engineering

In December 1975 land with an area of 440 hectares was dedicated by the Forestry Organization to ZNU. On February 20, 1976 Zanjan Higher School for Agriculture & Animal Science started its work under the new title Zanjan Agriculture & Animal Science College while it enhanced its Agriculture & Animal Science Courses to a BS Level.

With a Council for the Expansion of Higher Education agreement (April 25, 1987) on enrolling students in the Engineering college, the council altered the Zanjan A&AS college title to a Center for Higher Education on May 8, 1987 (including Engineering and Agriculture colleges). Following this the science and humanities colleges were established in 1990 & 1991, respectively, and the Ministry of Culture and Higher Education changed the center for higher school in Zanjan to University of Zanjan.

Zanjan University is one the Iran's most politically active college campuses and 2008 Zanjan University Protests gained international attentions and inspired other similar movements in schools and universities Women Lead Rallies.

== Demographics ==
=== Population ===
At the time of the 2006 National Census, the university's population was 125 in 36 households. The following census in 2011 counted 2,229 people in 51 households. The 2016 census measured the population as 3,881 people in 27 households. It was the most populous locality in its rural district.

== Faculties and departments ==
The university has four faculties

Faculty of Engineering

- Department of Industrial Engineering
- Department of Civil Engineering
- Department of Electrical Engineering
- Department of Mechanical Engineering
- Department of Computer Engineering
- Department of Surveying Engineering
- Department of Mining Engineering
- Department of Chemical Engineering
- Department of Metallurgical Engineering
- Department of Architecture
- Department of Painting

Faculty of Sciences

- Department of Physics
- Department of Mathematics
- Department of Chemistry
- Department of Geology
- Department of Biology
- Department of Statistics
- Department of Environmental science

Faculty of Humanities

- Department of Islamic History
- Department of Geography
- Department of Philosophy
- Department of Persian
- Department of Physical Education & Sport Sciences
- Department of English Language and Literature and Translation Studies
- Department of Accountancy
- Department of Islamic Mysticism
- Department of Psychology
- Department of Economic Sciences
- Department of Commercial Management
- Department of Industrial Management
- Department of Law

Faculty of Agriculture

- Department of Agricultural Extension, Communication and Rural Development
- Department of Agronomy & Plant Breeding
- Department of Animal Sciences
- Department of Food Industry
- Department of Horticulture
- Department of Irrigation
- Department of Plant Protection
- Department of Soil Sciences

== World rankings ==
Times Ranking of World Universities

- 2016: International rank : +801

Webometrics Ranking of World Universities

- 2012: International rank : 2466, National rank : 26

Islamic World Science Citation Database Rankings

- 2014: National rank : 19
- 2013: National rank : 20
- 2012: National rank : 20
- 2011: National rank : 22
- 2010: National rank : 29

UI GreenMetric overall ranking

- 2017: World rank : 47
- 2015: World rank : 69
- 2014: World rank : 128

== Notable people ==
- Sadollah Nasiri Gheydari is a physicist and professor at the university. He also was a reformist representative of Zanjan and Tarom County in the Islamic Consultative Assembly.

== Student Organizations ==
- Islamic Association of Students

== International Journals ==
1. Ethical Reflections: https://jer.znu.ac.ir/?lang=en
2. Journal of Architectural and Environmental Research: https://jaer.znu.ac.ir/?lang=en
3. Journal of Economic Geography Research: https://jurs.znu.ac.ir/?lang=en
4. Journal of Interdisciplinary Research in English Language Communication: https://irelc.znu.ac.ir/
5. Journal of Medicinal Plants Biotechnology: https://jmpb.znu.ac.ir/?lang=en
6. Philosophical Meditations: https://phm.znu.ac.ir/?lang=en

== See also ==
- Institute for Advanced Studies in Basic Sciences (IASBS)
- Islamic Azad University of Zanjan
- Institute for Studies in Theoretical Physics and Mathematics (IPM)
- Higher education in Iran
- List of universities in Iran

Media related to Zanjan University at Wikimedia Commons
