= Zanjan province =

Province of Iran

Zanjan province استان زنجان (Persian)
- Province
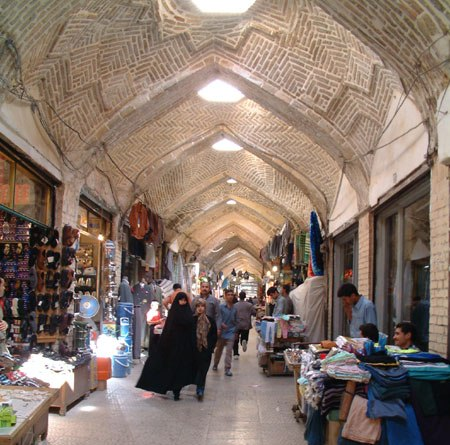
- The Safavid era bazaar of Zanjan

- Location of Zanjan province within Iran
- Coordinates: 36°24′N 48°17′E
- Country: Iran
- Region: Region 3
- Capital: Zanjan
- Counties: 8

Government
  - Governor-general: Mohsen Sadeghi

Area
  - Total: 21,773 km^{2} (8,407 sq mi)

Population (2016)
  - Total: 1,057,461
  - Density: 48.568/km^{2} (125.79/sq mi)
- Time zone: UTC+03:30 (IRST)
- Main language(s): Persian (official) local languages: Azerbaijani (Majority); Tati
- HDI (2017): 0.771 high · 23rd

Zanjan province (Persian: استان زنجان) (Note: Also romanized as Ostân-e Zanjân; also known as Zangan province) is one of the 31 provinces of Iran. Its capital is the city of Zanjan. It is a mountainous province with close to 22,000 km^{2} of land placed in Iran's Region 3. Two-thirds of the people of the province live in the cities, mainly the capital and Abhar.

== History ==
In Ptolemy's Geography, the city is referred to as Aganzana. It is said that the Sasanian king Ardashir I reconstructed the city and called it Shahin. Later it was renamed Zangan, whose present name is the Arabicised form. Historically, Zanjan has also been called Khamseh, meaning "province with five tribes". Zanjan province incorporates areas of the former Gerrus province.

=== Former names ===
At least since the Zand era, Zanjan and its surrounding areas were called Khamseh. In a book named Mojmal al-Tawarikh-e Golestaneh, while discussing the events of the Karim Khan Zand era, it mentions the Mahal-e Khamseh (literally, "Khamseh areas") in reference to the regions of Zanjan province. The use of Khamseh for Zanjan could precede the Zand era, since following Nader Shah's death and the collapse of the great unification of the Afshar tribes, the tribe of Afshar-e Khamseh returned to the Mahal-e Khamseh. The tribe's name, therefore, had already contained the suffix of "Khamseh" since the era of Nader Shah, and possibly before they had left the Zanjan area to accompany Nader. It can be concluded that at least since the time of Nader and the Afsharids, the area was called Khamseh.

It has been said that when Karim Khan Zand left Ardabil and Khalkhal to suppress Zaki Khan in Kashan, he entered Zanjan, and in Abhar he delegated the governorship of three areas of Mahal-e Khamseh to Zolfagharkhan-e Sultan Irluy-e Afshar. This is another indication of the area's having been named Khamseh at the time of the Zands.

During the Qajar era, Zanjan province was also known as Khamseh. In the book Esker-ol-Tavarikh, Etemad Al-Saltaneh discusses Agha Mohammad Khan Qajar just before the formation of the Qajar dynasty, using the title of Hakem-e Khamseh (Governor of Khamseh). In addition, Mirza Abolhasan Khan Shirazi in his travelogue in the year 1229 Hijri (around 1814) mentions Khamseh. Among European travellers, the first person who used the name Khamseh for the province where Zanjan was located was Pierre Amédée Jaubert, sent by Napoleon Bonaparte to visit Fath-Ali Shah Qajar's court, and in the year 1804 visited Zanjan city.

== Demographics ==
=== Ethnicity ===
Azerbaijanis are the main ethnic group in the province followed by Tats. As in every other region of Iran, the lingua franca is Persian.

=== Population ===
At the time of the 2006 National Census, the province's population was 942,818 in 235,771 households. The following census in 2011 counted 1,015,734 inhabitants living in 286,806 households. The 2016 census measured the population of the province as 1,057,461 in 321,983 households.

=== Administrative divisions ===

The population history and structural changes of Zanjan province's administrative divisions over three consecutive censuses are shown in the following table.

Zanjan province
Counties	2006	2011	2016
Abhar	158,544	169,176	151,528
Ijrud	35,661	38,416	36,641
Khodabandeh	161,696	169,553	164,493
Khorramdarreh	60,027	65,166	67,951
Mahneshan	41,223	40,312	39,425
Soltaniyeh (Note: Separated from Abhar County after the 2011 census)	—	—	29,480
Tarom	42,939	46,616	46,641
Zanjan	442,728	486,495	521,302
Total	942,818	1,015,734	1,057,461

=== Cities ===
According to the 2016 census, 711,177 people (over 67% of the population of Zanjan province) live in the following cities:

City	Population
Ab Bar	8,091
Abhar	99,285
Armaghankhaneh	2,149
Chavarzaq	1,733
Dandi	4,778
Garmab	3,823
Halab	956
Hidaj	13,840
Karasf	3,083
Khorramdarreh	55,368
Mah Neshan	5,487
Nik Pey	455
Nurbahar	3,644
Qeydar	34,921
Sain Qaleh	12,989
Sohrevard	6,991
Sojas	7,037
Soltaniyeh	7,638
Zanjan	430,871
Zarrin Rud	5,664
Zarrinabad	2,374

== Geography ==
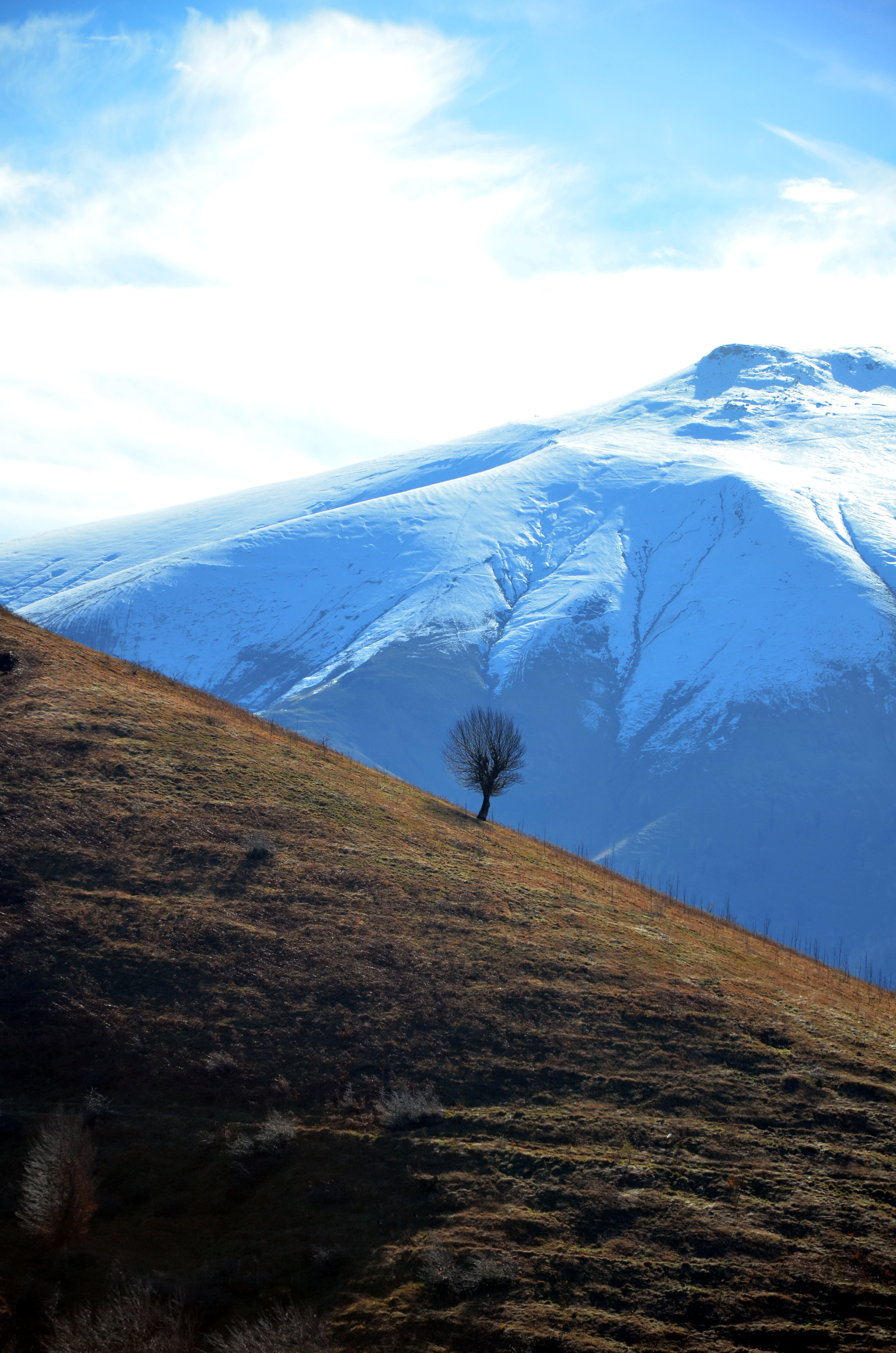
Landscape in Zanjan province, Tarom

Zanjan has an area of 22,164 km^{2}, occupying 1.34% of Iran's territory. The average population density in Zanjan is 47 people per km^{2}. In the northwest of Iran, Zanjan shares borders with seven provinces: East Azerbaijan, West Azerbaijan, Hamadan, Kurdistan, Gilan, Qazvin, and Ardabil. The Zanjan River is the only major river in the region.

=== Climate ===
Zanjan has a highland climate characterized by cold, snowy weather in the mountains and moderate climate in the plains in wintertime. In the summers, the weather is warm. The average maximum temperature of Zanjan is around 27 °C, whereas the average minimum temperature stands at −19 °C. Meanwhile, the temperature rises to 32 °C on hot days; it drops to −27 °C on cold days.

The average annual rainfall in the first month of spring is 72 mm, while in the second month of summer, it is 3.6 mm. The rate of humidity in the morning averages 74% and at noon 43%.

== Economy ==
Zanjan province's economy benefits from its location connecting central Iran to the northwestern provinces. The railway and highway that connect Iran's capital city Tehran to Tabriz and Turkey pass through the province.

Agriculture is the principal occupation, and crops include rice, corn (maize), oilseeds, fruits, and potatoes. Poultry, cattle, and sheep are raised. Zanjan is known regionally for its seedless grapes. Manufactured product includes bricks, cement, milled rice, and carpets. Chromium, lead, and copper are mined. In the scientific world, Zanjan is the home of IASBS, one of the most productive research centers of the country.

=== Handicrafts ===
Zanjan is known for its handicrafts, such as knives, traditional sandals called charoogh, and malileh (a handcraft made with silver wires). Zanjani artists produce many objects, like decorative dishes and their special covers, as well as silver jewelry. In ancient times, Zanjan was known for its stainless and sharp knives, but the tradition has gradually become extinct since the introduction of Chinese knives that are cheaper and more skillfully made. Many villagers today are traditional carpet weavers.

== Higher education ==
The Institute for Advanced Studies in Basic Sciences IASBS, in the city of Zanjan, is one of Iran's most distinguished upper-level education and research centers in the pure sciences. Zanjan is home to the University of Zanjan, Zanjan University of Medical Sciences, and Islamic Azad University of Zanjan.

== See also ==
Media related to Zanjan Province at Wikimedia Commons
