= Yousef Sobouti =

Iranian astrophysicist and theoretical physicist

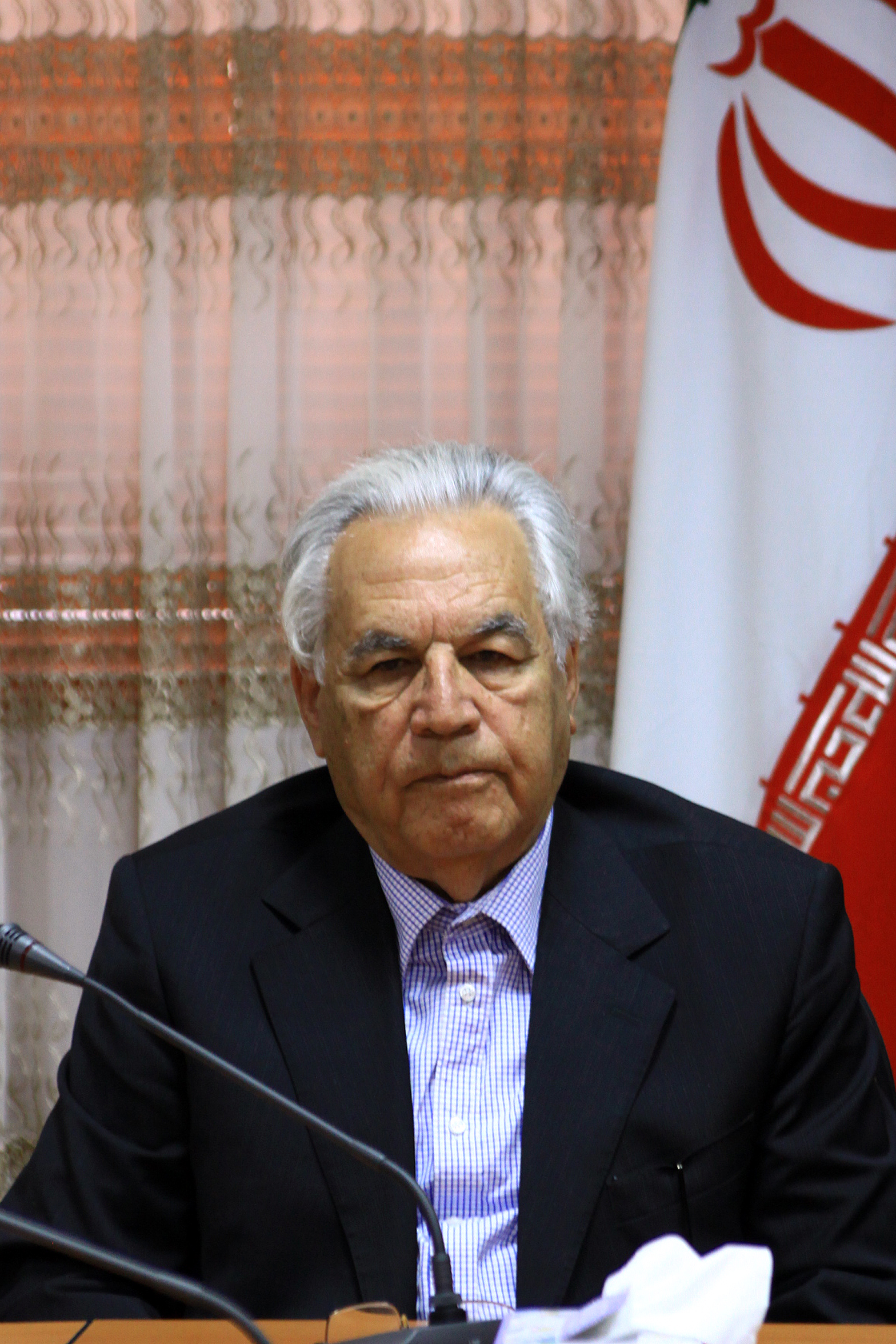
- Born: 23 August 1932 (age 94); Zanjan, Iran
- Education: University of Tehran (1950-1953; B.Sc., 1953); University of Toronto (1958-1960; M.A., 1960); University of Chicago (1960-1963; Ph.D., 1963)
- Awards: Medallion for Excellence in Research, Iran (1978); The Book of the Year, Iran (1995); The World Academy of Sciences (TWAS) Medal Lecturer in Physical Sciences (2000); Khwarizmi International Award (2001); TWAS Regional Office Prize for Scientific Institution Building in Central and South Asian Region, Bangalore (2012)
- Scientific career
- Doctoral advisor: Subrahmanyan Chandrasekhar
- Website: http://iasbs.ac.ir/~sobouti/

Yousef Sobouti (Persian: یوسف ثبوتی, born 23 August 1932 in Zanjan, Iran) is a contemporary Iranian astrophysicist, theoretical physicist.

== Biography ==
He got his undergraduate degree from Tehran University. In 1960 he received his MSc degree in physics from University of Toronto.

He finished his doctoral thesis on Astronomy and Astrophysics at University of Chicago under the supervision of Subrahmanyan Chandrasekhar in 1963.

He started teaching physics in Sharif University of Technology, and Shiraz University. Sobouti made significant contributions to the education of physics and basic sciences in Iran. His aim was to train young scientists who were capable of performing world- class research.

He is the founder of Institute for Advanced Studies in Basic Sciences (IASBS), Currently known as the University of Advanced Studies in Basic Sciences. He remained director until August 2010 when he was dismissed by the cabinet Minister of Science, Research and Technology.

Many academics and students as well as many distinguished individuals in the city of Zanjan reflected their disappointment with the ministry on this decision. The Parliament representatives complained to the minister on this particular case.

He was one of the people who changed the old educational system (known as Dar ul Funun) to term system.

== Positions held ==
- Lecturer, Dept. of Math., University of Newcastle upon Tyne, 1968-1964
- Associate Professor, Physics, Shiraz University, 1964-1970
- Visiting associate professor, Astronomy, University of Pennsylvania, 1968-1969
- Visiting associate professor, Physics,
- Founding Director, Biruni Observatory of Shiraz University, 1971-1981
- Professor of Physics, Shiraz University, 1971 to 1999
- Chairman, Physics Department, Shiraz University, 1972-1974 and 1978-1980
- Visiting Senior Researcher, Astronomical Institute, University of Amsterdam, 1975-1976
- Member of the Council of Shiraz University, 1976–1979, 1989-1991
- Visiting Scholar, Astronomy and Astrophysics Center, University of Chicago, 1984-1985
- Associate fellow, International Center for Theoretical Physics, 1987-1993
- Fellow, The World Academy of Sciences (TWAS), 1987 – present
- Fellow, Iran Academy of Sciences, 1988 – present
- Visiting professor, Physics Department, Northeastern University, Boston, 1991-1992
- Professor of Physics, IASBS, 1991-2021
- Founding President, IASBS, 1992-2010
- Founder, Center for Research in Climate Change and Global Warming, IASBS, 2012
- Founding Director, Center for Research in Climate Change and Global Warming, IASBS, 2012–present
- Head, Academy of Sciences of Iran, Basic Sciences Branch, 2012-2019
- Adjunct Professor, International Center for Relativistic Astrophysics Network (ICRANET), Pescara, Italy, 2015

== Most cited scientific works ==
1. Y. Sobouti, An gravitation for galactic environments Astronomy & Astrophysics 464 (3), 921–925, 2007
2. Y. Sobouti, Chandrasekhar's X-, Y- and Related Functions. The Astrophysical Journal Supplement Series 7, 411, 1963
3. H. Safari, S. Nasiri, Y. Sobouti, Fast kink modes of longitudinally stratified coronal loops Astronomy & Astrophysics 470 (3), 1111–1116, 2007
4. Y. Sobouti, S. Nasiri, A phase space formulation of quantum state functions International journal of modern physics B 7 (18), 3255–3272, 1993
5. S.S. Hasan, Y. Sobouti, Mode classification and wave propagation in a magnetically structured medium Monthly Notices of the Royal Astronomical Society 228 (2), 427–451, 1987
6. J.W. Chamberlain, Y. Sobouti, Fluorescent Scattering in Planetary Atmospheres. I. Basic Theoretical Considerations. The Astrophysical Journal 135, 925, 1962
7. Y. Sobouti, The Potentials for the GP and the Toroidal Modes of Self-Gravitating Fluids Astronomy and Astrophysics 100, 319, 1981
8. J.N. Silverman, Y. Sobouti, Normal modes of self-gravitating fluids in perturbed configurations. I-Perturbational-variational procedure. II-Perturbational-variational expansion of the g-and p-modes of a non-adiabatic fluid about the adiabatic limit. Astronomy and Astrophysics 62, 355–363, 1978
9. Y. Sobouti, A Definition of the g-and p-Modes of Self-gravitating Fluids, Astronomy and Astrophysics 55, 327,1977
10. H. Safari, S. Nasiri, K. Karami, Y. Sobouti, Resonant absorption in dissipative flux tubes. Astronomy & Astrophysics 448 (1), 375–378, 2006
11. Y. Sobouti, Normal modes of rotating fluids. Astronomy and Astrophysics 89, 314–335, 1980
12. Y. Sobouti, Fluorescent Scattering in Planetary Atmospheres. II. Coupling among Transitions. The Astrophysical Journal 135, 938, 1962

Yousef Sobouti has Hirsch index h=16.

== Awards ==
- Medallion for Excellence in Research, Iran (1978)
- The Book of the Year, Iran (1995)
- The World Academy of Sciences (TWAS) Medal Lecturer in Physical Sciences (2000)
- Khwarizmi International Award (2001)
- TWAS Regional Office Prize for Scientific Institution Building in Central and South Asian Region, Bangalore (2012)
